= 2012 United States House of Representatives elections =

House elections for the 113th U.S. Congress

- November 6, 2012

All 435 seats in the United States House of Representatives (Note: As well as the 6 non-voting delegates.) 218 seats needed for a majority
- Turnout: 52.0% ▲11.1 pp
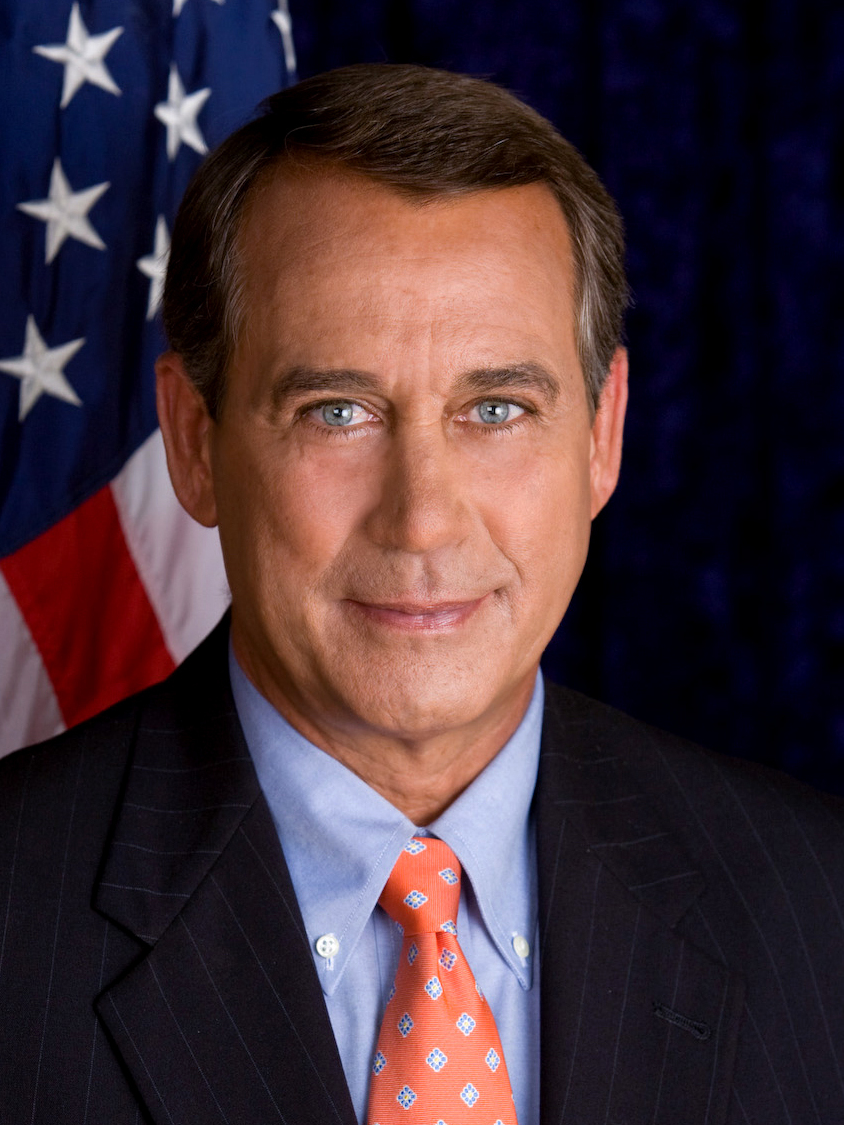

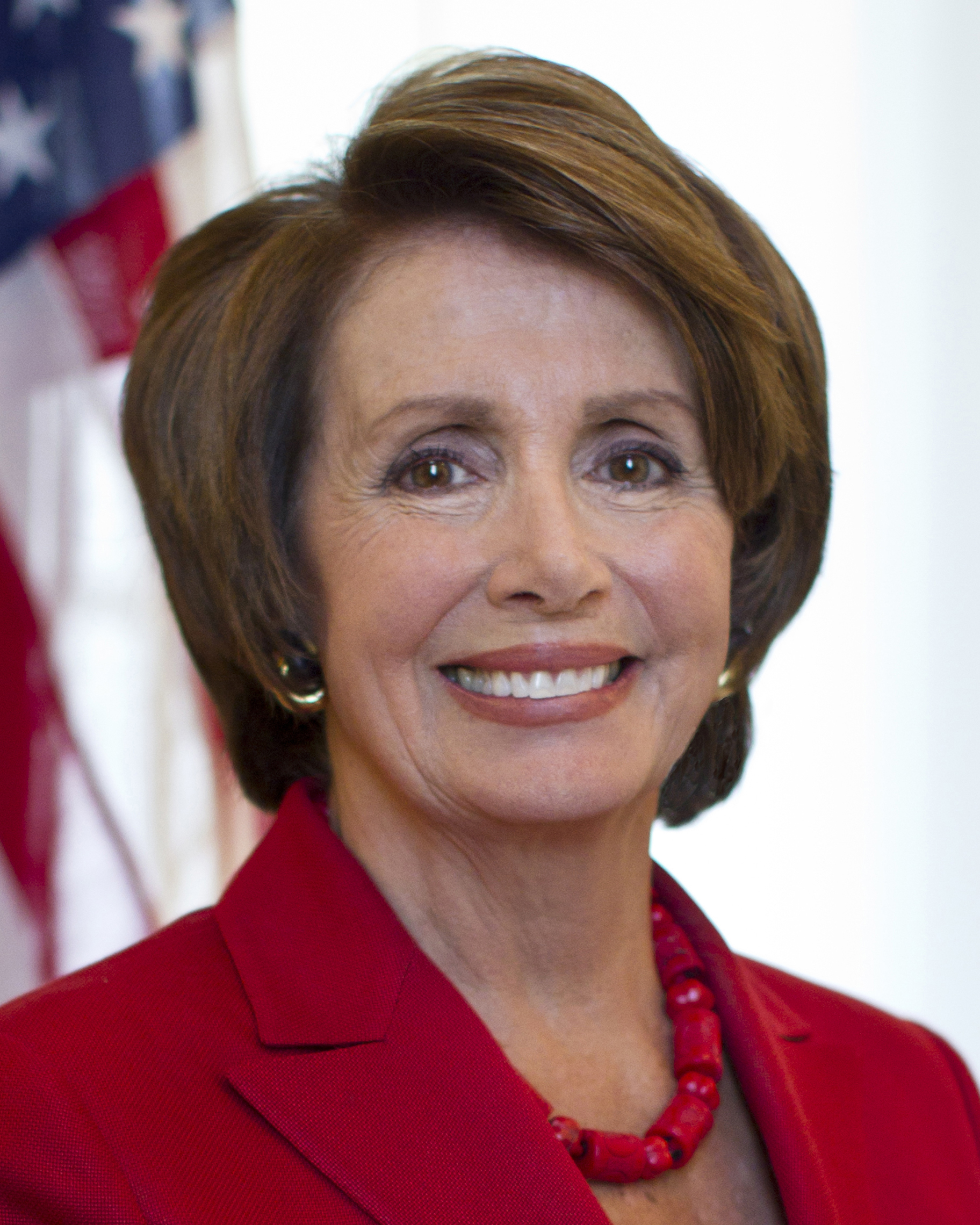
| | Majority party | Minority party |
|---|---|---|
| Leader | John Boehner | Nancy Pelosi |
| Party | Republican | Democratic |
| Leader since | January 3, 2007 | January 3, 2003 |
| Leader's seat | Ohio 8th | California 12th |
| Last election | 242 seats, 51.7% | 193 seats, 44.9% |
| Seats won | 234 | 201 |
| Seat change | ▼8 | ▲8 |
| Popular vote | 58,283,314 | 59,645,531 |
| Percentage | 47.7% | 48.8% |
| Swing | ▼4.0pp | ▲3.9pp |
- Results: Democratic hold Democratic gain Republican hold Republican gain
Speaker before election
John Boehner
Republican
Elected Speaker
John Boehner
Republican

The 2012 United States House of Representatives elections were held on November 6, 2012. It coincided with the reelection of President Barack Obama. Elections were held for all 435 seats representing the 50 U.S. states and also for the delegates from the District of Columbia and five major U.S. territories. The winners of this election cycle served in the 113th United States Congress. This was the first congressional election using districts drawn up based on the 2010 United States census.

Although Democratic candidates received a nationwide plurality of more than 1.4 million votes (1.1%) in the aggregated vote totals from all House elections, the Republican Party won a 33-seat advantage in seats, thus retaining its House majority by 17 seats. Democrats picked up 27 previously Republican-held seats, but most of these gains were canceled out due to Republican pick-ups of Democratic-held seats, and reapportionment gains that benefited Republicans, leaving the Democrats with a net gain of just eight seats.

This disparity — common in close elections involving single-member district (especially plurality) voting — has sometimes been attributed to targeted Republican gerrymandering in the congressional redistricting process following the 2010 census as part of the REDMAP project. "Unintentional gerrymandering," — the high concentration of Democrats in urban centers—leading to "wasted votes" in districts that easily elected Democratic candidates, has also been cited as causing some of the efficiency gap. The GOP also benefited from having a greater number of incumbents, who tend to have an advantage in elections which may have helped Republicans win close elections for individual seats.

This marked the most recent of five House elections in which the party that won the popular vote was unable to receive a majority in the House. The previous four times were in 1914, 1942, 1952, and 1996; in the former two elections, Democrats won the House majority without winning the popular vote, whereas in the latter two, the Republicans did so. The 2012 elections were also the first since 1996 where a president and a House majority of different parties were simultaneously elected, and are the most recent ones to date. Additionally, they were the most recent House elections in which a winning presidential candidate's party gained seats in the chamber.

As of 2026, this is the last time Democrats won a House seat in West Virginia.

== Results summary ==
=== Federal ===
↓
| 234 | 201 |
| Republican | Democratic |

Summary of the November 6, 2012 United States House of Representatives election results
| Parties | Seats | | | | Popular vote | | |
|---|---|---|---|---|---|---|---|
| Parties | 2010 | 2012 | Net change | Strength | Vote | % | Change |
| Republican Party | 242 | 234 | ▼8 | 53.8% | 58,283,314 | 47.7% | −4.0% |
| Democratic Party | 193 | 201 | ▲8 | 46.2% | 59,645,531 | 48.8% | +3.9% |
| Libertarian Party | – | – | – | – | 1,360,925 | 1.1% | −0.1% |
| Independent | – | – | – | – | 1,240,672 | 1.0% | +0.4% |
| Green Party | – | – | – | – | 373,455 | 0.3% | – |
| Constitution Party | – | – | – | – | 111,576 | 0.1% | −0.1% |
| Reform Party | – | – | – | – | 70,682 | 0.1% | +0.1% |
| Others | - | - | - | - | 1,205,344 | 1.0% | +0.1% |
| Totals | 435 | 435 | 0 | 100.0% | 122,291,499 | 100.0% | - |
Source: Election Statistics – Office of the Clerk (does not include blank or over/under votes)

=== Per state ===
| State | Total seats | Democratic | | Republican | |
| State | Total seats | Seats | Change | Seats | Change |
|---|---|---|---|---|---|
| Alabama | 7 | 1 | Steady | 6 | Steady |
| Alaska | 1 | 0 | Steady | 1 | Steady |
| Arizona | 9 | 5 | ▲2 | 4 | ▼1 |
| Arkansas | 4 | 0 | ▼1 | 4 | ▲1 |
| California | 53 | 38 | ▲4 | 15 | ▼4 |
| Colorado | 7 | 3 | Steady | 4 | Steady |
| Connecticut | 5 | 5 | Steady | 0 | Steady |
| Delaware | 1 | 1 | Steady | 0 | Steady |
| Florida | 27 | 10 | ▲4 | 17 | ▼2 |
| Georgia | 14 | 5 | Steady | 9 | ▲1 |
| Hawaii | 2 | 2 | Steady | 0 | Steady |
| Idaho | 2 | 0 | Steady | 2 | Steady |
| Illinois | 18 | 12 | ▲4 | 6 | ▼5 |
| Indiana | 9 | 2 | ▼1 | 7 | ▲1 |
| Iowa | 4 | 2 | ▼1 | 2 | Steady |
| Kansas | 4 | 0 | Steady | 4 | Steady |
| Kentucky | 6 | 1 | ▼1 | 5 | ▲1 |
| Louisiana | 6 | 1 | Steady | 5 | ▼1 |
| Maine | 2 | 2 | Steady | 0 | Steady |
| Maryland | 8 | 7 | ▲1 | 1 | ▼1 |
| Massachusetts | 9 | 9 | ▼1 | 0 | Steady |
| Michigan | 14 | 5 | ▼1 | 9 | Steady |
| Minnesota | 8 | 5 | ▲1 | 3 | ▼1 |
| Mississippi | 4 | 1 | Steady | 3 | Steady |
| Missouri | 8 | 2 | ▼1 | 6 | Steady |
| Montana | 1 | 0 | Steady | 1 | Steady |
| Nebraska | 3 | 0 | Steady | 3 | Steady |
| Nevada | 4 | 2 | ▲1 | 2 | Steady |
| New Hampshire | 2 | 2 | ▲2 | 0 | ▼2 |
| New Jersey | 12 | 6 | ▼1 | 6 | Steady |
| New Mexico | 3 | 2 | Steady | 1 | Steady |
| New York | 27 | 21 | Steady | 6 | ▼2 |
| North Carolina | 13 | 4 | ▼3 | 9 | ▲3 |
| North Dakota | 1 | 0 | Steady | 1 | Steady |
| Ohio | 16 | 4 | ▼1 | 12 | ▼1 |
| Oklahoma | 5 | 0 | ▼1 | 5 | ▲1 |
| Oregon | 5 | 4 | Steady | 1 | Steady |
| Pennsylvania | 18 | 5 | ▼2 | 13 | ▲1 |
| Rhode Island | 2 | 2 | Steady | 0 | Steady |
| South Carolina | 7 | 1 | Steady | 6 | ▲1 |
| South Dakota | 1 | 0 | Steady | 1 | Steady |
| Tennessee | 9 | 2 | Steady | 7 | Steady |
| Texas | 36 | 12 | ▲3 | 24 | ▲1 |
| Utah | 4 | 1 | Steady | 3 | ▲1 |
| Vermont | 1 | 1 | Steady | 0 | Steady |
| Virginia | 11 | 3 | Steady | 8 | Steady |
| Washington | 10 | 6 | ▲1 | 4 | Steady |
| West Virginia | 3 | 1 | Steady | 2 | Steady |
| Wisconsin | 8 | 3 | Steady | 5 | Steady |
| Wyoming | 1 | 0 | Steady | 1 | Steady |
| Total | 435 | 201 | ▲8 | 234 | ▼8 |

Popular vote
| Democratic | 48.75% |
| Republican | 47.59% |
| Libertarian | 1.12% |
| Green | 0.30% |
| Other | 2.24% |

House seats
| Republican | 53.79% |
| Democratic | 46.21% |

=== Maps ===
Results shaded by winners share of vote

Popular vote by states

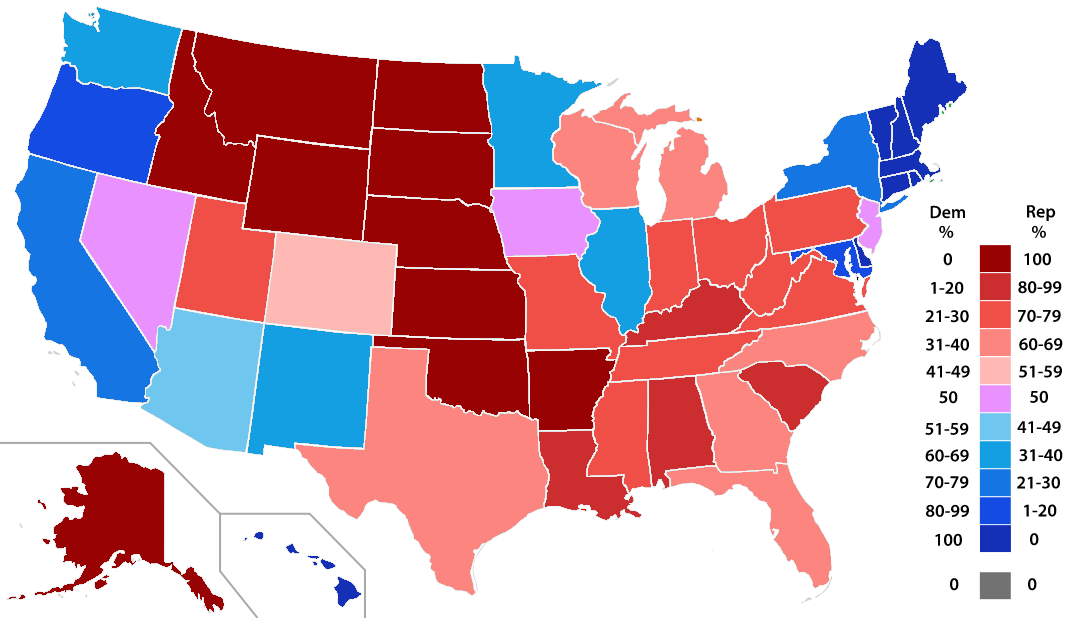
House seats by party holding plurality in state

== Retiring incumbents ==
Retiring incumbents by district Democratic incumbent ran Democratic incumbent retired or lost renomination Republican incumbent ran Republican incumbent retired or lost renomination Democratic and Republican incumbent ran Vacant or new district

Forty-one representatives retired. Thirty-four of those seats were held by the same party, six seats changed party.

=== Democrats ===
Twenty-two Democrats retired. Fourteen of those seats were held by Democrats, five were won by Republicans, and three seats were eliminated in redistricting.

==== Democratic held ====
1. California 6: Lynn Woolsey, was succeeded by Jared Huffman (with district being renumbered as California 2).
2. California 51: Bob Filner, to run for mayor of San Diego, was succeeded by Juan Vargas.
3. Connecticut 5: Chris Murphy, to run for U.S. Senate, was succeeded by Elizabeth Esty.
4. Hawaii 2: Mazie Hirono, to run for U.S. Senate, was succeeded by Tulsi Gabbard.
5. Illinois 12: Jerry Costello, was succeeded by William Enyart.
6. Massachusetts 4: Barney Frank, was succeeded by Joseph P. Kennedy III.
7. Michigan 5: Dale Kildee, was succeeded by Dan Kildee.
8. Nevada 1: Shelley Berkley, to run for U.S. Senate, was succeeded by Dina Titus.
9. New Mexico 1: Martin Heinrich, to run for U.S. Senate, was succeeded by Michelle Lujan Grisham.
10. New York 5: Gary Ackerman, was succeeded by Grace Meng (with district being renumbered as New York 6).
11. New York 10: Edolphus Towns, was succeeded by Hakeem Jeffries (with district being renumbered as New York 8).
12. Texas 20: Charlie Gonzalez, was succeeded by Joaquín Castro.
13. Washington 6: Norm Dicks, was succeeded by Derek Kilmer.
14. Wisconsin 2: Tammy Baldwin, to run for U.S. Senate, was succeeded by Mark Pocan.

==== Republican gain ====
1. Arkansas 4: Mike Ross, was succeeded by Tom Cotton.
2. Indiana 2: Joe Donnelly, to run for U.S. Senate, was succeeded by Jackie Walorski.
3. North Carolina 11: Heath Shuler, was succeeded by Mark Meadows.
4. North Carolina 13: Brad Miller, was succeeded by George Holding.
5. Oklahoma 2: Dan Boren, was succeeded by Markwayne Mullin.

==== Seats eliminated in redistricting ====
1. California 18: Dennis Cardoza.
2. Massachusetts 1: John Olver.
3. New York 22: Maurice Hinchey.

=== Republicans ===
Nineteen Republicans retired. Fifteen of those seats were held by Republicans, one was won by a Democrat, and three seats were eliminated in redistricting.

==== Republican held ====
1. Arizona 6: Jeff Flake, to run for U.S. Senate, was succeeded by Matt Salmon (with district being renumbered as Arizona 5).
2. California 2: Wally Herger, was succeeded by Doug LaMalfa (with district being renumbered as California 1).
3. California 41: Jerry Lewis, was succeeded by Paul Cook (with district being renumbered as California 8).
4. Florida 14: Connie Mack IV, to run for U.S. Senate, was succeeded by Trey Radel (with district being renumbered as Florida 19).
5. Illinois 15: Tim Johnson, was succeeded by Rodney L. Davis (with district being renumbered as Illinois 13).
6. Indiana 5: Dan Burton, was succeeded by Susan Brooks.
7. Indiana 6: Mike Pence, to run for Governor of Indiana, was succeeded by Luke Messer.
8. Missouri 2: Todd Akin, to run for U.S. Senate, was succeeded by Ann Wagner.
9. Michigan 11: Thaddeus McCotter: failed to make the ballot for renomination due to fraudulent signatures, resigned July 6, 2012, and was succeeded by Democrat David Curson for a partial term and Republican Kerry Bentivolio for a full term.
10. Montana at-large: Denny Rehberg, to run for U.S. Senate, was succeeded by Steve Daines.
11. North Carolina 9: Sue Myrick, was succeeded by Robert Pittenger.
12. North Dakota at-large: Rick Berg, to run for U.S. Senate, was succeeded by Kevin Cramer.
13. Ohio 14: Steve LaTourette, was succeeded by David Joyce.
14. Pennsylvania 19: Todd Russell Platts, was succeeded by Scott Perry (with district being renumbered as Pennsylvania 4).
15. Texas 14: Ron Paul, to run for U.S. President, was succeeded by Randy Weber.

==== Democratic gain ====
1. California 24: Elton Gallegly, was succeeded by Julia Brownley (with district being renumbered as California 26).

==== Seats eliminated in redistricting ====
1. California 26: David Dreier.
2. New York 9: Bob Turner, who ran for U.S. Senate.
3. Ohio 7: Steve Austria.

== Incumbents defeated ==
As a result of redistricting, many incumbents were forced to compete against each other in the same district, which resulted in a larger number of incumbents being defeated in primaries.

=== In primary elections ===
Thirteen representatives lost renomination: eight were lost in redistricting battles pitting incumbents against each other, and five incumbents lost nomination to non-incumbent challengers.

==== Democrats ====
Seven Democrats lost renomination: five in redistricting and two to a non-incumbent challenger.

===== Seat held by a Democrat =====
These primary winners later won the general election.

1. Michigan 14: Hansen Clarke lost a redistricting race to fellow incumbent Gary Peters
2. Missouri 1: Russ Carnahan lost a redistricting race to fellow incumbent Lacy Clay
3. New Jersey 9: Steve Rothman lost a redistricting race to fellow incumbent Bill Pascrell
4. Ohio 9: Dennis Kucinich lost a redistricting race to fellow incumbent Marcy Kaptur
5. Pennsylvania 17: Tim Holden lost to challenger Matt Cartwright
6. Texas 16: Silvestre Reyes lost to challenger Beto O'Rourke

===== Seat lost to a Republican =====
1. Pennsylvania 12: Jason Altmire lost a redistricting race to fellow incumbent Mark Critz, who later lost the general election

==== Republicans ====
Six Republicans lost renomination: three in redistricting races and three to a non-incumbent challenger. All the seats were held by Republicans.

1. Arizona 6: Ben Quayle lost a redistricting race to fellow incumbent David Schweikert
2. Florida 3: Cliff Stearns lost to challenger Ted Yoho
3. Florida 7: Sandy Adams lost a redistricting race to fellow incumbent John Mica
4. Illinois 16: Don Manzullo lost a redistricting race to fellow incumbent Adam Kinzinger
5. Ohio 2: Jean Schmidt lost to challenger Brad Wenstrup
6. Oklahoma 1: John Sullivan lost to challenger Jim Bridenstine

=== In general elections ===
==== Democrats ====
Ten incumbent Democrats lost re-election; four to fellow Democrats and six to Republicans. Four losses were in California: two due to redistricting putting two incumbents together (resulting in a net loss of two for the Democrats) and two due to the state's top two primary. Two incumbents outside of California lost to Republican incumbents after being redistricted to the same district.

===== Seat held by a Democrat =====
1. California 15: Pete Stark lost to Eric Swalwell
2. California 30: Howard Berman lost a redistricting race to fellow incumbent Brad Sherman
3. California 35: Joe Baca lost to Gloria Negrete McLeod
4. California 44: Laura Richardson lost a redistricting race to fellow incumbent Janice Hahn

===== Seat lost to a Republican incumbent =====
1. Iowa 3: Leonard Boswell lost a redistricting race to Tom Latham
2. Ohio 16: Betty Sutton lost a redistricting race to Jim Renacci

===== Seat lost to a Republican challenger =====
1. Kentucky 6: Ben Chandler lost to Andy Barr.
2. New York 27: Kathy Hochul lost to Chris Collins.
3. North Carolina 8: Larry Kissell lost to Richard Hudson.
4. Pennsylvania 12: Mark Critz lost to Keith Rothfus.

==== Republicans ====
Seventeen incumbent Republicans lost re-election.

===== Seat held by a Republican =====
One incumbent Republican lost re-election to a fellow incumbent Republican.

1. Louisiana 3: Jeff Landry lost to Charles Boustany

===== Seat lost to a Democratic challenger =====
Sixteen incumbent Republicans, ten of whom were first elected in 2010, lost re-election to Democrats.

1. California 7: Dan Lungren lost to Ami Bera.
2. California 36: Mary Bono Mack lost to Raul Ruiz.
3. California 52: Brian Bilbray lost to Scott Peters.
4. Florida 18: Allen West lost to Patrick Murphy.
5. Florida 26: David Rivera lost to Joe Garcia.
6. Illinois 8: Joe Walsh lost to Tammy Duckworth.
7. Illinois 10: Robert Dold lost to Brad Schneider.
8. Illinois 11: Judy Biggert lost to Bill Foster.
9. Illinois 17: Bobby Schilling lost to Cheri Bustos.
10. Maryland 6: Roscoe Bartlett lost to John K. Delaney.
11. Minnesota 8: Chip Cravaack lost to Rick Nolan.
12. New Hampshire 1: Frank Guinta lost to Carol Shea-Porter.
13. New Hampshire 2: Charles Bass lost to Ann Kuster.
14. New York 18: Nan Hayworth lost to Sean Patrick Maloney.
15. New York 24: Ann Marie Buerkle lost to Dan Maffei.
16. Texas 23: Quico Canseco lost to Pete Gallego.

== Reapportionment ==
The 2010 United States census determined how many of the 435 congressional districts each state receives for the 2010 redistricting cycle. Due to population shifts, Illinois, Iowa, Louisiana, Massachusetts, Michigan, Missouri, New Jersey, and Pennsylvania each lost one seat; and New York and Ohio each lost two seats. Conversely, Arizona, Georgia, Nevada, South Carolina, Utah, and Washington each gained one seat; Florida gained two seats; and Texas gained four seats.

=== New seats ===
Twelve new districts were created after the 2010 redistricting process:

1. Arizona 9
2. Florida 26
3. Florida 27
4. Georgia 14
5. Nevada 4
6. South Carolina 7
7. Utah 4
8. Texas 33
9. Texas 34
10. Texas 35
11. Texas 36
12. Washington 10

=== Seats eliminated ===
The following districts were eliminated and became obsolete:

1. Illinois 19
2. Iowa 5
3. Louisiana 7
4. Massachusetts 10
5. Michigan 15
6. Missouri 9
7. New Jersey 13
8. New York 28
9. New York 29
10. Ohio 17
11. Ohio 18
12. Pennsylvania 19

== Newly created seats ==
Of the 435 districts created in the 2010 redistricting, nineteen had no incumbent representative.

=== Democratic gain ===
Twelve Democrats were elected in newly created seats.

1. Arizona 1: won by Ann Kirkpatrick
2. Arizona 9: won by Kyrsten Sinema
3. California 29: won by Tony Cardenas
4. California 41: won by Mark Takano
5. California 47: won by Alan Lowenthal
6. Florida 9: won by Alan Grayson
7. Florida 22: won by Lois Frankel
8. Ohio 3: won by Joyce Beatty
9. Texas 33: won by Marc Veasey
10. Texas 34: won by Filemon Vela Jr.
11. Nevada 4: won by Steven Horsford
12. Washington 10: won by Denny Heck

=== Republican gain ===
Seven Republicans were elected in newly created seats.

1. California 21: won by David Valadao
2. Florida 6: won by Ron DeSantis
3. Georgia 9: won by Doug Collins
4. South Carolina 7: won by Tom Rice
5. Texas 25: won by Roger Williams
6. Texas 36: won by Steve Stockman
7. Utah 2: won by Chris Stewart

== Closest races ==
Sixty-four races were decided by 10% or lower.

| District | Winner | Margin |
|---|---|---|
| North Carolina 7th | Democratic | 0.19% |
| Utah 4th | Democratic | 0.31% |
| Illinois 13th | Republican | 0.34% |
| Michigan 1st | Republican | 0.54% |
| Florida 18th | Democratic (flip) | 0.58% |
| Arizona 2nd | Democratic | 0.84% |
| Massachusetts 6th | Democratic | 1.15% |
| Minnesota 6th | Republican | 1.21% |
| Illinois 10th | Democratic (flip) | 1.26% |
| Puerto Rico at-large | Democratic | 1.28% |
| Indiana 2nd | Republican (flip) | 1.43% |
| New York 27th | Republican (flip) | 1.57% |
| Nebraska 2nd | Republican | 1.59% |
| New York 21st | Democratic | 1.97% |
| Colorado 6th | Republican | 2.04% |
| California 52nd | Democratic (flip) | 2.35% |
| Connecticut 5th | Democratic | 2.62% |
| California 7th | Democratic (flip) | 3.36% |
| Pennsylvania 12th | Republican (flip) | 3.47% |
| Florida 10th | Republican | 3.48% |
| Arizona 1st | Democratic | 3.65% |
| New Hampshire 1st | Democratic (flip) | 3.76% |
| New York 23rd | Republican | 3.82% |
| Kentucky 6th | Republican (flip) | 3.89% |
| New York 18th | Democratic (flip) | 3.90% |
| Ohio 16th | Republican | 4.09% |
| Arizona 9th | Democratic | 4.10% |
| California 15th | Democratic | 4.22% (Note: Under California's "jungle primary" system, the general election was between two Democrats.) |
| Texas 23rd | Democratic (flip) | 4.75% |
| New Hampshire 2nd | Democratic (flip) | 4.83% |
| New York 1st | Democratic | 4.98% |
| California 26th | Democratic (flip) | 5.38% |
| New York 11th | Republican | 5.41% |
| California 10th | Republican | 5.42% |
| Florida 2nd | Republican | 5.46% |
| New York 24th | Democratic (flip) | 5.46% |
| New York 19th | Republican | 5.60% |
| California 36th | Democratic (flip) | 5.88% |
| North Carolina 9th | Republican | 6.13% (Note: This seat was the tipping point seat for a Republican majority.) |
| Michigan 11th | Republican (flip) | 6.40% |
| Ohio 6th | Republican | 6.50% |
| Illinois 17th | Democratic (flip) | 6.56% |
| Florida 16th | Republican | 7.22% |
| Georgia 12th | Democratic | 7.40% |
| Nevada 3rd | Republican | 7.49% |
| Virginia 2nd | Republican | 7.66% |
| North Carolina 8th | Republican (flip) | 7.79% |
| Washington 1st | Democratic | 7.87% |
| California 33rd | Democratic | 7.91% |
| West Virginia 3rd | Democratic | 7.96% |
| Nevada 4th | Democratic | 8.00% |
| Iowa 4th | Republican | 8.10% |
| Minnesota 2nd | Republican | 8.16% |
| Illinois 8th | Democratic (flip) | 8.37% |
| Michigan 3rd | Republican | 8.45% |
| California 3rd | Democratic | 8.46% |
| Iowa 3rd | Republican (flip) | 8.63% |
| Texas 14th | Republican | 8.85% |
| New Jersey 3rd | Republican | 8.86% |
| Minnesota 8th | Democratic (flip) | 8.89% |
| Illinois 12th | Democratic | 8.91% |
| Hawaii 1st | Democratic | 9.23% |
| Florida 22nd | Democratic (flip) | 9.25% |
| California 25th | Republican | 9.56% |

== Special elections ==
There were six special elections in 2012. Winners would have a seniority advantage over other freshmen. Two elections were held separate from the November elections and four elections were held concurrent with the November elections.

| District | Incumbent | | | Result | Candidates |
| District | Member | Party | First elected | Result | Candidates |
|---|---|---|---|---|---|
| Oregon 1 | David Wu | Democratic | 1998 | Incumbent resigned August 3, 2011. New member elected January 31, 2012. Democratic hold. The winner was subsequently re-elected in November, see below. | ▌ ✓ Suzanne Bonamici (Democratic) 53.8%; ▌Rob Cornilles (Republican) 39.6% |
| Arizona 8 | Gabby Giffords | Democratic | 2006 | Incumbent resigned January 25, 2012. New member elected June 12, 2012. Democratic hold. The winner was subsequently re-elected in November, see below. | ▌ ✓ Ron Barber (Democratic) 52.3%; ▌Jesse Kelly (Republican) 45.4%; ▌Charlie Manolakis (Green) 2.3% |
| Kentucky 4 | Geoff Davis | Republican | 2004 | Incumbent resigned July 31, 2012 for family health reasons. New member elected November 6, 2012. Republican hold. Winner was also elected the same day to the next term, see below. | ▌ ✓ Thomas Massie (Republican) 59.9%; ▌Bill Adkins (Democratic) 36.7%; ▌David Lewis (Independent) 3.4% |
| Michigan 11 | Thad McCotter | Republican | 2002 | Incumbent resigned July 6, 2012 after failing to qualify for renomination. New member elected November 6, 2012. Democratic gain. Winner was not elected the same day to the next term, see below. | ▌ ✓ David Curson (Democratic) 48.39%; ▌Kerry Bentivolio (Republican) 46.10%; ▌John Tatar (Libertarian) 3.53%; ▌Marc Sosnowski (U.S. Taxpayers) 1.98% |
| New Jersey 10 | Donald M. Payne | Democratic | 1988 | Incumbent died March 6, 2012. New member elected November 6, 2012 to finish his father's term. Democratic hold. Winner was also elected the same day to the next term, see below. | ▌ ✓ Donald Payne Jr. (Democratic) 97.4%; ▌Joanne Miller (Independent) 2.6% |
| Washington 1 | Jay Inslee | Democratic | 1998 | Incumbent resigned March 20, 2012 to run for Governor of Washington. New member elected November 6, 2012. Democratic hold. Winner was also elected the same day to the next term, see below. | ▌ ✓ Suzan DelBene (Democratic) 60.1%; ▌John Koster (Republican) 39.9% |

== Alabama ==
| District | PVI | Incumbent | Party | First elected | Result | Candidates |
|---|---|---|---|---|---|---|
| Alabama 1 | R+14 | Jo Bonner | Republican | 2002 | Incumbent re-elected. | ▌ ✓ Jo Bonner (Republican) 97.9% |
| Alabama 2 | R+18 | Martha Roby | Republican | 2010 | Incumbent re-elected. | ▌ ✓ Martha Roby (Republican) 63.7%; ▌Therese Ford (Democratic) 36.3% |
| Alabama 3 | R+15 | Mike Rogers | Republican | 2002 | Incumbent re-elected. | ▌ ✓ Mike Rogers (Republican) 64.1%; ▌John Andrew Harris (Democratic) 35.9% |
| Alabama 4 | R+23 | Robert Aderholt | Republican | 1996 | Incumbent re-elected. | ▌ ✓ Robert Aderholt (Republican) 74.0%; ▌Daniel Boman (Democratic) 26.0% |
| Alabama 5 | R+14 | Mo Brooks | Republican | 2010 | Incumbent re-elected. | ▌ ✓ Mo Brooks (Republican) 65.0%; ▌Charlie Holley (Democratic) 35.0% |
| Alabama 6 | R+28 | Spencer Bachus | Republican | 1992 | Incumbent re-elected. | ▌ ✓ Spencer Bachus (Republican) 71.4%; ▌Penny Bailey (Democratic) 28.6% |
| Alabama 7 | D+17 | Terri Sewell | Democratic | 2010 | Incumbent re-elected. | ▌ ✓ Terri Sewell (Democratic) 75.8%; ▌Don Chamberlain (Republican) 24.2% |

== Alaska ==
| District | PVI | Incumbent | Party | First elected | Result | Candidates |
|---|---|---|---|---|---|---|
| Alaska at-large | R+13 | Don Young | Republican | 1973 (special) | Incumbent re-elected. | ▌ ✓ Don Young (Republican) 64.7%; ▌Sharon Cissna (Democratic) 28.4%; ▌Jim C. McDermott (Libertarian) 5.1%; ▌Ted Gianoutsos (Independent) 1.9% |

== Arizona ==
Arizona gained one seat in reapportionment. A second open seat was created when a pair of Republicans were redistricted into the same district. Primary elections were August 28, 2012.

| District | PVI | Incumbent | Party | First elected | Result | Candidates |
|---|---|---|---|---|---|---|
| Arizona 1 | R+3 | None (New seat) | | | New seat. Democratic gain. | ▌ ✓ Ann Kirkpatrick (Democratic) 48.8%; ▌Jonathan Paton (Republican) 45.1%; ▌Kim Allen (Libertarian) 6.0% |
| Arizona 2 | R+2 | Ron Barber; Renumbered from the 8th district | Democratic | 2012 (special) | Incumbent re-elected. | ▌ ✓ Ron Barber (Democratic) 50.42%; ▌Martha McSally (Republican) 49.58%; ▌Anthony Powell (Libertarian) 0.02% |
| Arizona 3 | D+7 | Raúl Grijalva; Redistricted from the 7th district | Democratic | 2002 | Incumbent re-elected. | ▌ ✓ Raúl Grijalva (Democratic) 57.8%; ▌Gabby Saucedo Mercer (Republican) 37.7%; ▌Blanca Guerra (Libertarian) 4.4% |
| Arizona 4 | R+16 | Paul Gosar; Redistricted from the 1st district | Republican | 2010 | Incumbent re-elected. | ▌ ✓ Paul Gosar (Republican) 67.0%; ▌Johnnie Robinson (Democratic) 28.3%; ▌Joe Pamelia (Libertarian) 3.7%; ▌Richard Grayson (Americans Elect) 1.0% |
| Arizona 5 | R+16 | Jeff Flake; Redistricted from the 6th district | Republican | 2000 | Incumbent retired to run for U.S. senator. Republican hold. | ▌ ✓ Matt Salmon (Republican) 67.2%; ▌Spencer Morgan (Democratic) 32.7% |
| Arizona 6 | R+10 | Ben Quayle; Redistricted from the 3rd district | Republican | 2010 | Incumbent lost renomination. Republican loss. | ▌ ✓ David Schweikert (Republican) 61.7%; ▌Matt Jette (Democratic) 33.1%; ▌Jack Anderson (Libertarian) 3.3%; ▌Mark Salazar (Green) 1.8% |
| Arizona 6 | R+10 | David Schweikert; Redistricted from the 5th district | Republican | 2010 | Incumbent re-elected. | ▌ ✓ David Schweikert (Republican) 61.7%; ▌Matt Jette (Democratic) 33.1%; ▌Jack Anderson (Libertarian) 3.3%; ▌Mark Salazar (Green) 1.8% |
| Arizona 7 | D+12 | Ed Pastor; Redistricted from the 4th district | Democratic | 1991 (special) | Incumbent re-elected. | ▌ ✓ Ed Pastor (Democratic) 80.3%; ▌Joe Cobb (Libertarian) 19.2% |
| Arizona 8 | R+13 | Trent Franks; Renumbered from the 2th district | Republican | 2002 | Incumbent re-elected. | ▌ ✓ Trent Franks (Republican) 63.6%; ▌Gene Scharer (Democratic) 34.8%; ▌Stephen Dolgos (Americans Elect) 1.5% |
| Arizona 9 | R+1 | None (New seat) | | | New seat. Democratic gain. | ▌ ✓ Kyrsten Sinema (Democratic) 48.5%; ▌Vernon Parker (Republican) 44.8%; ▌Powell Gammill (Libertarian) 6.6% |

== Arkansas ==
| District | PVI | Incumbent | Party | First elected | Result | Candidates |
|---|---|---|---|---|---|---|
| Arkansas 1 | R+7 | Rick Crawford | Republican | 2010 | Incumbent re-elected. | ▌ ✓ Rick Crawford (Republican) 56.4%; ▌Scott Ellington (Democratic) 39.0%; ▌Jessica Paxton (Libertarian) 2.6%; ▌Jacob Holloway (Green) 2.0% |
| Arkansas 2 | R+5 | Tim Griffin | Republican | 2010 | Incumbent re-elected. | ▌ ✓ Tim Griffin (Republican) 55.2%; ▌Herb Rule (Democratic) 39.5%; ▌Barbara Ward (Green) 3.0%; ▌Chris Hayes (Libertarian) 2.3% |
| Arkansas 3 | R+16 | Steve Womack | Republican | 2010 | Incumbent re-elected. | ▌ ✓ Steve Womack (Republican) 75.8%; ▌Rebekah Kennedy (Green) 16.1%; ▌David Pangrac (Libertarian) 8.1% |
| Arkansas 4 | R+9 | Mike Ross | Democratic | 2000 | Incumbent retired. Republican gain. | ▌ ✓ Tom Cotton (Republican) 59.5%; ▌Gene Jeffress (Democratic) 36.7%; ▌Josh Drake (Green) 1.9%; ▌Bobby Tullis (Libertarian) 1.9% |

== California ==
California's results

California retained its fifty-three seats: four new seats were created when four pairs of Representatives were redistricted to run against each other. An additional Republican incumbent, Gary Miller, won re-election in an entirely different district from the one he had previously represented. The election featured the first use of the top-two primary system in which primary elections list candidates from all parties on one ballot, and the top two vote-getters advance to the general election. Two elections (30th and 44th districts) featured two Democratic incumbents running against each other.

| District | PVI | Incumbent | Party | First elected | Result | Candidates |
|---|---|---|---|---|---|---|
| California 1 | R+10 | Wally Herger; Redistricted from the 2nd district | Republican | 1986 | Incumbent retired. Republican hold. | ▌ ✓ Doug LaMalfa (Republican) 57.9%; ▌Jim Reed (Democratic) 42.1% |
| California 2 | D+19 | Lynn Woolsey; Redistricted from the 6th district | Democratic | 1992 | Incumbent retired. Democratic hold. | ▌ ✓ Jared Huffman (Democratic) 70.1%; ▌Daniel Roberts (Republican) 29.9% |
| California 3 | D+1 | John Garamendi; Redistricted from the 10th district | Democratic | 2009 (special) | Incumbent re-elected. | ▌ ✓ John Garamendi (Democratic) 54.2%; ▌Kim Vann (Republican) 45.8% |
| California 4 | R+10 | Tom McClintock | Republican | 2008 | Incumbent re-elected. | ▌ ✓ Tom McClintock (Republican) 61.1%; ▌Jack Uppal (Democratic) 38.9% |
| California 5 | D+18 | Mike Thompson; Redistricted from the 1st district | Democratic | 1998 | Incumbent re-elected. | ▌ ✓ Mike Thompson (Democratic) 74.1%; ▌Randy Loftin (Republican) 25.9% |
| California 6 | D+13 | Doris Matsui; Redistricted from the 5th district | Democratic | 2005 (special) | Incumbent re-elected. | ▌ ✓ Doris Matsui (Democratic) 74.4%; ▌Joseph McCray Sr. (Republican) 25.6% |
| California 7 | R+3 | Dan Lungren; Redistricted from the 3rd district | Republican | 1978; 1988 (retired); 2004 | Incumbent lost re-election. Democratic gain. | ▌ ✓ Ami Bera (Democratic) 51.1%; ▌Dan Lungren (Republican) 48.9% |
| California 8 | R+12 | Jerry Lewis; Redistricted from the 41st district | Republican | 1978 | Incumbent retired. Republican hold. | ▌ ✓ Paul Cook (Republican) 57.6%; ▌Gregg Imus (Republican) 42.4% |
| California 9 | D+2 | Jerry McNerney; Redistricted from the 11th district | Democratic | 2006 | Incumbent re-elected. | ▌ ✓ Jerry McNerney (Democratic) 55.5%; ▌Ricky Gill (Republican) 44.5% |
| California 10 | R+5 | Jeff Denham; Redistricted from the 19th district | Republican | 2010 | Incumbent re-elected. | ▌ ✓ Jeff Denham (Republican) 53.8%; ▌José M. Hernández (Democratic) 46.2% |
| California 10 | R+5 | Dennis Cardoza; Redistricted from the 18th district | Democratic | 2002 | Incumbent retired. Democratic loss. | ▌ ✓ Jeff Denham (Republican) 53.8%; ▌José M. Hernández (Democratic) 46.2% |
| California 11 | D+17 | George Miller; Redistricted from the 7th district | Democratic | 1974 | Incumbent re-elected. | ▌ ✓ George Miller (Democratic) 69.1%; ▌Virginia Fuller (Republican) 30.9% |
| California 12 | D+35 | Nancy Pelosi; Redistricted from the 8th district | Democratic | 1987 (special) | Incumbent re-elected. | ▌ ✓ Nancy Pelosi (Democratic) 84.8%; ▌John Dennis (Republican) 15.2% |
| California 13 | D+37 | Barbara Lee; Redistricted from the 9th district | Democratic | 1998 (special) | Incumbent re-elected. | ▌ ✓ Barbara Lee (Democratic) 86.3%; ▌Marilyn Singleton (Independent) 13.7% |
| California 14 | D+23 | Jackie Speier; Redistricted from the 12th district | Democratic | 2008 (special) | Incumbent re-elected. | ▌ ✓ Jackie Speier (Democratic) 73.7%; ▌Debbie Bacigalupi (Republican) 26.3% |
| California 15 | D+15 | Pete Stark; Redistricted from the 13th district | Democratic | 1972 | Incumbent lost re-election. Democratic hold. | ▌ ✓ Eric Swalwell (Democratic) 53.0%; ▌Pete Stark (Democratic) 47.0% |
| California 16 | D+2 | Jim Costa; Redistricted from the 20th district | Democratic | 2004 | Incumbent re-elected. | ▌ ✓ Jim Costa (Democratic) 57.4%; ▌Brian Whelan (Republican) 42.6% |
| California 17 | D+18 | Mike Honda; Redistricted from the 15th district | Democratic | 2000 | Incumbent re-elected. | ▌ ✓ Mike Honda (Democratic) 73.3%; ▌Evelyn Li (Republican) 26.7% |
| California 18 | D+18 | Anna Eshoo; Redistricted from the 14th district | Democratic | 1992 | Incumbent re-elected. | ▌ ✓ Anna Eshoo (Democratic) 70.0%; ▌Dave Chapman (Republican) 30.0% |
| California 19 | D+16 | Zoe Lofgren; Redistricted from the 16th district | Democratic | 1994 | Incumbent re-elected. | ▌ ✓ Zoe Lofgren (Democratic) 72.7%; ▌Robert Murray (Republican) 27.3% |
| California 20 | D+19 | Sam Farr; Redistricted from the 17th district | Democratic | 1993 (special) | Incumbent re-elected. | ▌ ✓ Sam Farr (Democratic) 72.9%; ▌Jeff Taylor (Republican) 27.1% |
| California 21 | R+3 | None (New seat) | | | New seat. Republican gain. | ▌ ✓ David Valadao (Republican) 59.9%; ▌John Hernandez (Democratic) 40.1% |
| California 22 | R+12 | Devin Nunes; Redistricted from the 21st district | Republican | 2002 | Incumbent re-elected. | ▌ ✓ Devin Nunes (Republican) 63.1%; ▌Otto Lee (Democratic) 36.9% |
| California 23 | R+18 | Kevin McCarthy; Redistricted from the 22nd district | Republican | 2006 | Incumbent re-elected. | ▌ ✓ Kevin McCarthy (Republican) 73.8%; ▌Terry Phillips (Independent) 26.2% |
| California 24 | D+3 | Lois Capps; Redistricted from the 23rd district | Democratic | 1998 (special) | Incumbent re-elected. | ▌ ✓ Lois Capps (Democratic) 55.1%; ▌Abel Maldonado (Republican) 44.9% |
| California 25 | R+6 | Buck McKeon | Republican | 1992 | Incumbent re-elected. | ▌ ✓ Buck McKeon (Republican) 54.8%; ▌Lee Rogers (Democratic) 45.2% |
| California 26 | D+2 | Elton Gallegly; Redistricted from the 24th district | Republican | 1986 | Incumbent retired. Democratic gain. | ▌ ✓ Julia Brownley (Democratic) 51.7%; ▌Tony Strickland (Republican) 48.3% |
| California 27 | D+9 | Judy Chu; Redistricted from the 32nd district | Democratic | 2009 (special) | Incumbent re-elected. | ▌ ✓ Judy Chu (Democratic) 63.4%; ▌Jack Orswell (Republican) 36.6% |
| California 28 | D+19 | Adam Schiff; Redistricted from the 29th district | Democratic | 2000 | Incumbent re-elected. | ▌ ✓ Adam Schiff (Democratic) 76.0%; ▌Phil Jennerjahn (Republican) 24.0% |
| California 29 | D+21 | None (New seat) | | | New seat. Democratic gain. | ▌ ✓ Tony Cárdenas (Democratic) 74.2%; ▌David Hernandez (Independent) 25.8% |
| California 30 | D+13 | Brad Sherman; Redistricted from the 27th district | Democratic | 1996 | Incumbent re-elected. | ▌ ✓ Brad Sherman (Democratic) 60.5%; ▌Howard Berman (Democratic) 39.5% |
| California 30 | D+13 | Howard Berman; Redistricted from the 28th district | Democratic | 1982 | Incumbent lost re-election. Democratic loss. | ▌ ✓ Brad Sherman (Democratic) 60.5%; ▌Howard Berman (Democratic) 39.5% |
| California 31 | D+12 | David Dreier; Redistricted from the 26th district | Republican | 1980 | Incumbent retired. Republican loss. | ▌ ✓ Gary Miller (Republican) 55.2%; ▌Robert Dutton (Republican) 44.8% |
| California 31 | D+12 | Gary Miller; Redistricted from the 42nd district | Republican | 1998 | Incumbent re-elected. | ▌ ✓ Gary Miller (Republican) 55.2%; ▌Robert Dutton (Republican) 44.8% |
| California 32 | D+9 | Grace Napolitano; Redistricted from the 38th district | Democratic | 1998 | Incumbent re-elected. | ▌ ✓ Grace Napolitano (Democratic) 65.4%; ▌David Miller (Republican) 34.6% |
| California 33 | D+12 | Henry Waxman; Redistricted from the 30th district | Democratic | 1974 | Incumbent re-elected. | ▌ ✓ Henry Waxman (Democratic) 53.7%; ▌Bill Bloomfield (Independent) 46.3% |
| California 34 | D+28 | Xavier Becerra; Redistricted from the 31st district | Democratic | 1992 | Incumbent re-elected. | ▌ ✓ Xavier Becerra (Democratic) 85.6%; ▌Stephen C. Smith (Republican) 14.4% |
| California 35 | D+10 | Joe Baca; Redistricted from the 43rd district | Democratic | 1999 (special) | Incumbent lost re-election. Democratic hold. | ▌ ✓ Gloria Negrete McLeod (Democratic) 55.7%; ▌Joe Baca (Democratic) 44.3% |
| California 36 | R+3 | Mary Bono; Redistricted from the 45th district | Republican | 1998 (special) | Incumbent lost re-election. Democratic gain. | ▌ ✓ Raul Ruiz (Democratic) 51.4%; ▌Mary Bono (Republican) 48.6% |
| California 37 | D+33 | Karen Bass; Redistricted from the 33rd district | Democratic | 2010 | Incumbent re-elected. | ▌ ✓ Karen Bass (Democratic) 86.4%; ▌Morgan Osborne (Republican) 13.6% |
| California 38 | D+9 | Linda Sánchez; Redistricted from the 39th district | Democratic | 2002 | Incumbent re-elected. | ▌ ✓ Linda Sánchez (Democratic) 67.1%; ▌Benjamin Campos (Republican) 32.9% |
| California 39 | R+7 | Ed Royce; Redistricted from the 40th district | Republican | 1992 | Incumbent re-elected. | ▌ ✓ Ed Royce (Republican) 59.2%; ▌Jay Chen (Democratic) 40.8% |
| California 40 | D+25 | Lucille Roybal-Allard; Redistricted from the 34th district | Democratic | 1992 | Incumbent re-elected. | ▌ ✓ Lucille Roybal-Allard (Democratic) 59.4%; ▌David Sanchez (Democratic) 40.6% |
| California 41 | D+3 | None (New seat) | | | New seat. Democratic gain. | ▌ ✓ Mark Takano (Democratic) 56.4%; ▌John Tavaglione (Republican) 43.6% |
| California 42 | R+12 | Ken Calvert; Redistricted from the 44th district | Republican | 1992 | Incumbent re-elected. | ▌ ✓ Ken Calvert (Republican) 61.4%; ▌Michael Williamson (Democratic) 38.6% |
| California 43 | D+23 | Maxine Waters; Redistricted from the 35th district | Democratic | 1990 | Incumbent re-elected. | ▌ ✓ Maxine Waters (Democratic) 70.6%; ▌Bob Flores (Democratic) 29.4% |
| California 44 | D+29 | Janice Hahn; Redistricted from the 36th district | Democratic | 2011 (special) | Incumbent re-elected. | ▌ ✓ Janice Hahn (Democratic) 60.0%; ▌Laura Richardson (Democratic) 40.0% |
| California 44 | D+29 | Laura Richardson; Redistricted from the 37th district | Democratic | 2007 (special) | Incumbent lost re-election. Democratic loss. | ▌ ✓ Janice Hahn (Democratic) 60.0%; ▌Laura Richardson (Democratic) 40.0% |
| California 45 | R+8 | John Campbell; Redistricted from the 48th district | Republican | 2005 (special) | Incumbent re-elected. | ▌ ✓ John Campbell (Republican) 59.3%; ▌Sukhee Kang (Democratic) 40.7% |
| California 46 | D+3 | Loretta Sanchez; Redistricted from the 47th district | Democratic | 1996 | Incumbent re-elected. | ▌ ✓ Loretta Sanchez (Democratic) 60.6%; ▌Jerry Hayden (Republican) 39.4% |
| California 47 | D+5 | None (New seat) | | | New seat. Democratic gain. | ▌ ✓ Alan Lowenthal (Democratic) 56.6%; ▌Gary DeLong (Republican) 43.4% |
| California 48 | R+8 | Dana Rohrabacher; Redistricted from the 46th district | Republican | 1988 | Incumbent re-elected. | ▌ ✓ Dana Rohrabacher (Republican) 61.6%; ▌Ron Varasteh (Democratic) 38.4% |
| California 49 | R+5 | Darrell Issa | Republican | 2000 | Incumbent re-elected. | ▌ ✓ Darrell Issa (Republican) 58.9%; ▌Jerry Tetalman (Democratic) 41.1% |
| California 50 | R+14 | Duncan D. Hunter; Redistricted from the 52nd district | Republican | 2008 | Incumbent re-elected. | ▌ ✓ Duncan D. Hunter (Republican) 68.4%; ▌David B. Secor (Democratic) 31.6% |
| California 51 | D+11 | Bob Filner | Democratic | 1992 | Incumbent retired to run for mayor of San Diego. Democratic hold. | ▌ ✓ Juan Vargas (Democratic) 69.9%; ▌Michael Crimmins (Republican) 30.1% |
| California 52 | D+1 | Brian Bilbray; Redistricted from the 50th district | Republican | 1994; 2000 (defeated); 2006 (special) | Incumbent lost re-election. Democratic gain. | ▌ ✓ Scott Peters (Democratic) 51.2%; ▌Brian Bilbray (Republican) 48.8% |
| California 53 | D+7 | Susan Davis | Democratic | 2000 | Incumbent re-elected. | ▌ ✓ Susan Davis (Democratic) 60.4%; ▌Nick Popaditch (Republican) 39.6% |

== Colorado ==
| District | PVI | Incumbent | Party | First elected | Result | Candidates |
|---|---|---|---|---|---|---|
| Colorado 1 | D+17 | Diana DeGette | Democratic | 1996 | Incumbent re-elected. | ▌ ✓ Diana DeGette (Democratic) 68.1%; ▌Danny Stroud (Republican) 27.0%; ▌Frank Atwood (Libertarian) 3.5%; ▌Gary Swing (Green) 1.3% |
| Colorado 2 | D+8 | Jared Polis | Democratic | 2008 | Incumbent re-elected. | ▌ ✓ Jared Polis (Democratic) 56.0%; ▌Kevin Lundberg (Republican) 38.6%; ▌Randy Luallin (Libertarian) 3.2%; ▌Susan P. Hall (Green) 2.4% |
| Colorado 3 | R+4 | Scott Tipton | Republican | 2010 | Incumbent re-elected. | ▌ ✓ Scott Tipton (Republican) 53.5%; ▌Sal Pace (Democratic) 41.1%; ▌Tisha Casida (Independent) 3.2%; ▌Gregory Gilman (Libertarian) 2.3% |
| Colorado 4 | R+12 | Cory Gardner | Republican | 2010 | Incumbent re-elected. | ▌ ✓ Cory Gardner (Republican) 58.6%; ▌Brandon Shaffer (Democratic) 36.7%; ▌Josh Gilliland (Libertarian) 3.0%; ▌Doug Aden (American Constitution) 1.7% |
| Colorado 5 | R+15 | Doug Lamborn | Republican | 2006 | Incumbent re-elected. | ▌ ✓ Doug Lamborn (Republican) 65.3%; ▌Dave Anderson (Independent) 17.4%; ▌Jim Pirtle (Libertarian) 7.3%; ▌Misha Luzov (Green) 5.9%; ▌Ken Harvell (American Constitution) 4.2% |
| Colorado 6 | R+1 | Mike Coffman | Republican | 2008 | Incumbent re-elected. | ▌ ✓ Mike Coffman (Republican) 48.7%; ▌Joe Miklosi (Democratic) 45.1%; ▌Kathy Polhemus (Independent) 3.9%; ▌Patrick Provost (Libertarian) 2.4% |
| Colorado 7 | D+3 | Ed Perlmutter | Democratic | 2006 | Incumbent re-elected. | ▌ ✓ Ed Perlmutter (Democratic) 53.3%; ▌Joe Coors Jr. (Republican) 41.2%; ▌Doug Campbell (American Constitution) 3.0%; ▌Buck Bailey (Libertarian) 2.6% |

== Connecticut ==
Primary elections were held August 14, 2012.

| District | PVI | Incumbent | Party | First elected | Result | Candidates |
|---|---|---|---|---|---|---|
| Connecticut 1 | D+12 | John B. Larson | Democratic | 1998 | Incumbent re-elected. | ▌ ✓ John Larson (Democratic) 69.6%; ▌John Henry Decker (Republican) 27.8%; ▌Mike DeRosa (Green) 1.8%; ▌Matthew Corey (Independent) 0.8% |
| Connecticut 2 | D+6 | Joe Courtney | Democratic | 2006 | Incumbent re-elected. | ▌ ✓ Joe Courtney (Democratic) 68.3%; ▌Paul Formica (Republican) 29.3%; ▌Colin D. Bennett (Green) 1.2%; ▌Dan Reale (Libertarian) 1.2% |
| Connecticut 3 | D+9 | Rosa DeLauro | Democratic | 1990 | Incumbent re-elected. | ▌ ✓ Rosa DeLauro (Democratic) 74.6%; ▌Wayne Winsley (Republican) 25.4% |
| Connecticut 4 | D+5 | Jim Himes | Democratic | 2008 | Incumbent re-elected. | ▌ ✓ Jim Himes (Democratic) 59.8%; ▌Steve Obsitnik (Republican) 40.2% |
| Connecticut 5 | D+2 | Chris Murphy | Democratic | 2006 | Incumbent retired to run for U.S. senator. Democratic hold. | ▌ ✓ Elizabeth Esty (Democratic) 51.5%; ▌Andrew Roraback (Republican) 48.5% |

== Delaware ==
| District | PVI | Incumbent | Party | First elected | Result | Candidates |
|---|---|---|---|---|---|---|
| Delaware at-large | D+7 | John Carney | Democratic | 2010 | Incumbent re-elected. | ▌ ✓ John Carney (Democratic) 64.4%; ▌Tom Kovach (Republican) 33.4%; ▌Bernard August (Green) 1.1%; ▌Scott Gesty (Libertarian) 1.1% |

== Florida ==
Florida gained two seats in reapportionment. As a result of the Fair Districts Amendment, approved by voters via referendum in 2010, the legislature could not take incumbency into account in drawing the lines. As a result, two incumbent Republicans, John Mica and Sandy Adams, were drawn into the same district, creating a third new seat.

| District | PVI | Incumbent | Party | First elected | Result | Candidates |
|---|---|---|---|---|---|---|
| Florida 1 | R+21 | Jeff Miller | Republican | 2001 (special) | Incumbent re-elected. | ▌ ✓ Jeff Miller (Republican) 69.6%; ▌Jim Bryan (Democratic) 27.1%; ▌Calen Fretts (Libertarian) 3.3% |
| Florida 2 | R+3 | Steve Southerland | Republican | 2010 | Incumbent re-elected. | ▌ ✓ Steve Southerland (Republican) 52.7%; ▌Al Lawson (Democratic) 47.3% |
| Florida 3 | R+12 | Cliff Stearns; Redistricted from the 6th district | Republican | 1988 | Incumbent lost renomination Republican hold. | ▌ ✓ Ted Yoho (Republican) 64.7%; ▌J. R. Gaillot Jr. (Democratic) 32.5%; ▌Phil Dodds (Independent) 2.8% |
| Florida 4 | R+19 | Ander Crenshaw | Republican | 2000 | Incumbent re-elected. | ▌ ✓ Ander Crenshaw (Republican) 76.1%; ▌Jim Klauder (Independent) 23.9% |
| Florida 5 | D+17 | Corrine Brown; Redistricted from the 3rd district | Democratic | 1992 | Incumbent re-elected. | ▌ ✓ Corrine Brown (Democratic) 70.8%; ▌LeAnne Kolb (Republican) 26.3%; ▌Eileen Fleming (Independent) 3.0% |
| Florida 6 | R+6 | None (New seat) | | | New seat. Republican gain. | ▌ ✓ Ron DeSantis (Republican) 57.2%; ▌Heather Beaven (Democratic) 42.8% |
| Florida 7 | R+5 | John Mica | Republican | 1992 | Incumbent re-elected. | ▌ ✓ John Mica (Republican) 58.7%; ▌Jason Kendall (Democratic) 41.3% |
| Florida 7 | R+5 | Sandy Adams; Redistricted from the 24th district | Republican | 2010 | Incumbent lost renomination. Republican loss. | ▌ ✓ John Mica (Republican) 58.7%; ▌Jason Kendall (Democratic) 41.3% |
| Florida 8 | R+8 | Bill Posey; Redistricted from the 15th district | Republican | 2008 | Incumbent re-elected. | ▌ ✓ Bill Posey (Republican) 58.9%; ▌Shannon Roberts (Democratic) 37.5%; ▌Richard Gillmor (Independent) 3.6% |
| Florida 9 | D+4 | None (New seat) | | | New seat. Democratic gain. | ▌ ✓ Alan Grayson (Democratic) 62.5%; ▌Todd Long (Republican) 37.5% |
| Florida 10 | R+7 | Daniel Webster; Redistricted from the 8th district | Republican | 2010 | Incumbent re-elected. | ▌ ✓ Daniel Webster (Republican) 51.8%; ▌Val Demings (Democratic) 48.2% |
| Florida 11 | R+8 | Rich Nugent; Redistricted from the 5th district | Republican | 2010 | Incumbent re-elected. | ▌ ✓ Rich Nugent (Republican) 64.5%; ▌Dave Werder (Democratic) 35.5% |
| Florida 12 | R+6 | Gus Bilirakis; Redistricted from the 9th district | Republican | 2006 | Incumbent re-elected. | ▌ ✓ Gus Bilirakis (Republican) 63.5%; ▌Jonathan Michael Snow (Democratic) 32.9%; ▌John Russell (Independent) 2.1%; ▌Paul Elliot (Independent) 1.5% |
| Florida 13 | R+1 | Bill Young; Redistricted from the 10th district | Republican | 1970 | Incumbent re-elected. | ▌ ✓ Bill Young (Republican) 57.6%; ▌Jessica Ehrlich (Democratic) 42.4% |
| Florida 14 | D+11 | Kathy Castor; Redistricted from the 11th district | Democratic | 2006 | Incumbent re-elected. | ▌ ✓ Kathy Castor (Democratic) 70.2%; ▌E. J. Otero (Republican) 29.8% |
| Florida 15 | R+8 | Dennis Ross; Redistricted from the 12th district | Republican | 2010 | Incumbent re-elected. | ▌ ✓ Dennis Ross (Republican); Uncontested |
| Florida 16 | R+5 | Vern Buchanan; Redistricted from the 13th district | Republican | 2006 | Incumbent re-elected. | ▌ ✓ Vern Buchanan (Republican) 53.6%; ▌Keith Fitzgerald (Democratic) 46.4% |
| Florida 17 | R+10 | Tom Rooney; Redistricted from the 16th district | Republican | 2008 | Incumbent re-elected. | ▌ ✓ Tom Rooney (Republican) 58.7%; ▌Will Bronson (Democratic) 41.3% |
| Florida 18 | R+1 | Allen West; Redistricted from the 22nd district | Republican | 2010 | Incumbent lost re-election . Democratic gain. | ▌ ✓ Patrick Murphy (Democratic) 50.2%; ▌Allen West (Republican) 49.8% |
| Florida 19 | R+11 | Connie Mack IV; Redistricted from the 14th district | Republican | 2004 | Incumbent retired to run for U.S. senator. Republican hold. | ▌ ✓ Trey Radel (Republican) 62.0%; ▌James Roach (Democratic) 35.8%; ▌Brandon Smith (Independent) 2.2% |
| Florida 20 | D+28 | Alcee Hastings; Redistricted from the 23rd district | Democratic | 1992 | Incumbent re-elected. | ▌ ✓ Alcee Hastings (Democratic) 88.0%; ▌Randall Terry (Independent) 12.0% |
| Florida 21 | D+12 | Ted Deutch; Redistricted from the 19th district | Democratic | 2010 (special) | Incumbent re-elected. | ▌ ✓ Ted Deutch (Democratic) 77.7%; ▌Mike Trout (Independent) 13.3%; ▌Cesar Henao (Independent) 8.9% |
| Florida 22 | D+5 | None (New seat) | | | New seat. Democratic gain. | ▌ ✓ Lois Frankel (Democratic) 54.6%; ▌Adam Hasner (Republican) 45.4% |
| Florida 23 | D+10 | Debbie Wasserman Schultz; Redistricted from the 20th district | Democratic | 2004 | Incumbent re-elected. | ▌ ✓ Debbie Wasserman Schultz (Democratic) 63.3%; ▌Karen Harrington (Republican) 35.6%; ▌Ilya Katz (Independent) 1.1% |
| Florida 24 | D+33 | Frederica Wilson; Redistricted from the 17th district | Democratic | 2010 | Incumbent re-elected. | ▌ ✓ Frederica Wilson (Democratic); Uncontested |
| Florida 25 | R+8 | Mario Díaz-Balart; Redistricted from the 21st district | Republican | 2002 | Incumbent re-elected. | ▌ ✓ Mario Díaz-Balart (Republican) 75.7%; ▌Stanley Blumenthal (Independent) 15.8%; ▌VoteForEddie.com (Independent) 8.5% |
| Florida 26 | R+3 | David Rivera; Redistricted from the 25th district | Republican | 2010 | Incumbent lost re-election. Democratic gain. | ▌ ✓ Joe Garcia (Democratic) 53.6%; ▌David Rivera (Republican) 43.0%; ▌Angel Fernandez (Independent) 2.3%; ▌Jose Peixoto (Independent) 1.1% |
| Florida 27 | R+5 | Ileana Ros-Lehtinen; Redistricted from the 18th district | Republican | 1989 (special) | Incumbent re-elected. | ▌ ✓ Ileana Ros-Lehtinen (Republican) 60.2%; ▌Manny Yevancy (Democratic) 36.9%; ▌Thomas Cruz-Wiggins (Independent) 2.9% |

== Georgia ==
Georgia gained one seat in reapportionment.

| District | PVI | Incumbent | Party | First elected | Result | Candidates |
|---|---|---|---|---|---|---|
| Georgia 1 | R+9 | Jack Kingston | Republican | 1992 | Incumbent re-elected. | ▌ ✓ Jack Kingston (Republican) 63.0%; ▌Lesli Messinger (Democratic) 37.0% |
| Georgia 2 | D+4 | Sanford Bishop | Democratic | 1992 | Incumbent re-elected. | ▌ ✓ Sanford Bishop (Democratic) 63.8%; ▌John House (Republican) 36.2% |
| Georgia 3 | R+19 | Lynn Westmoreland | Republican | 2004 | Incumbent re-elected. | ▌ ✓ Lynn Westmoreland (Republican); Uncontested |
| Georgia 4 | D+17 | Hank Johnson | Democratic | 2006 | Incumbent re-elected. | ▌ ✓ Hank Johnson (Democratic) 73.6%; ▌J. Chris Vaughn (Republican) 26.4% |
| Georgia 5 | D+31 | John Lewis | Democratic | 1986 | Incumbent re-elected. | ▌ ✓ John Lewis (Democratic) 84.3%; ▌Howard Stopeck (Republican) 15.7% |
| Georgia 6 | R+14 | Tom Price | Republican | 2004 | Incumbent re-elected. | ▌ ✓ Tom Price (Republican) 64.6%; ▌Jeff Kazanow (Democratic) 35.4% |
| Georgia 7 | R+16 | Rob Woodall | Republican | 2010 | Incumbent re-elected. | ▌ ✓ Rob Woodall (Republican) 62.2%; ▌Steve Reilly (Democratic) 37.8% |
| Georgia 8 | R+15 | Austin Scott | Republican | 2010 | Incumbent re-elected. | ▌ ✓ Austin Scott (Republican); Uncontested |
| Georgia 9 | R+27 | None (New seat) | | | New seat. Republican gain. | ▌ ✓ Doug Collins (Republican) 76.2%; ▌Jody Cooley (Democratic) 23.8% |
| Georgia 10 | R+13 | Paul Broun | Republican | 2007 (special) | Incumbent re-elected. | ▌ ✓ Paul Broun (Republican); Uncontested |
| Georgia 11 | R+19 | Phil Gingrey | Republican | 2002 | Incumbent re-elected. | ▌ ✓ Phil Gingrey (Republican) 68.6%; ▌Patrick Thompson (Democratic) 31.4% |
| Georgia 12 | R+9 | John Barrow | Democratic | 2004 | Incumbent re-elected. | ▌ ✓ John Barrow (Democratic) 53.7%; ▌Lee Anderson (Republican) 46.3% |
| Georgia 13 | D+10 | David Scott | Democratic | 2002 | Incumbent re-elected. | ▌ ✓ David Scott (Democratic) 71.7%; ▌Shahid Malik (Republican) 28.3% |
| Georgia 14 | R+23 | Tom Graves; Redistricted from the 9th district | Republican | 2010 (special) | Incumbent re-elected. | ▌ ✓ Tom Graves (Republican) 73.0%; ▌Daniel Grant (Democratic) 27.0% |

== Hawaii ==
| District | PVI | Incumbent | Party | First elected | Result | Candidates |
|---|---|---|---|---|---|---|
| Hawaii 1 | D+11 | Colleen Hanabusa | Democratic | 2010 | Incumbent re-elected. | ▌ ✓ Colleen Hanabusa (Democratic) 54.6%; ▌Charles Djou (Republican) 45.4% |
| Hawaii 2 | D+14 | Mazie Hirono | Democratic | 2006 | Incumbent retired to run for U.S. senator. Democratic hold. | ▌ ✓ Tulsi Gabbard (Democratic) 80.6%; ▌Kawika Crowley (Republican) 19.4% |

== Idaho ==
| District | PVI | Incumbent | Party | First elected | Result | Candidates |
|---|---|---|---|---|---|---|
| Idaho 1 | R+18 | Raúl Labrador | Republican | 2010 | Incumbent re-elected. | ▌ ✓ Raúl Labrador (Republican) 63.0%; ▌Jimmy Farris (Democratic) 30.8%; ▌Rob Oates (Libertarian) 3.9%; ▌Pro-Life (Independent) 2.4% |
| Idaho 2 | R+17 | Mike Simpson | Republican | 1998 | Incumbent re-elected. | ▌ ✓ Mike Simpson (Republican) 65.2%; ▌Nicole LeFavour (Democratic) 34.8% |

== Illinois ==
Illinois lost one seat in reapportionment, forcing a pair of incumbent Republicans into the same district.

| District | PVI | Incumbent | Party | First elected | Result | Candidates |
|---|---|---|---|---|---|---|
| Illinois 1 | D+28 | Bobby Rush | Democratic | 1992 | Incumbent re-elected. | ▌ ✓ Bobby Rush (Democratic) 73.9%; ▌Donald Peloquin (Republican) 26.1% |
| Illinois 2 | D+27 | Jesse Jackson Jr. | Democratic | 1995 (special) | Incumbent re-elected, but resigned. | ▌ ✓ Jesse Jackson Jr. (Democratic) 62.1%; ▌Brian Woodworth (Republican) 23.4%; ▌Marcus Lewis (Independent) 13.5% |
| Illinois 3 | D+5 | Dan Lipinski | Democratic | 2004 | Incumbent re-elected. | ▌ ✓ Dan Lipinski (Democratic) 68.5%; ▌Richard Grabowski (Republican) 31.5% |
| Illinois 4 | D+26 | Luis Gutiérrez | Democratic | 1992 | Incumbent re-elected. | ▌ ✓ Luis Gutiérrez (Democratic) 83.3%; ▌Hector Concepcion (Republican) 16.7% |
| Illinois 5 | D+16 | Mike Quigley | Democratic | 2009 (special) | Incumbent re-elected. | ▌ ✓ Mike Quigley (Democratic) 65.6%; ▌Dan Schmitt (Republican) 28.7%; ▌Nancy Wade (Green) 5.7% |
| Illinois 6 | R+5 | Peter Roskam | Republican | 2006 | Incumbent re-elected. | ▌ ✓ Peter Roskam (Republican) 59.2%; ▌Leslie Coolidge (Democratic) 40.8% |
| Illinois 7 | D+37 | Danny Davis | Democratic | 1996 | Incumbent re-elected. | ▌ ✓ Danny Davis (Democratic) 84.6%; ▌Rita Zak (Republican) 11.0%; ▌John Monaghan (Independent) 4.4% |
| Illinois 8 | D+6 | Joe Walsh | Republican | 2010 | Incumbent lost re-election. Democratic gain. | ▌ ✓ Tammy Duckworth (Democratic) 54.7%; ▌Joe Walsh (Republican) 45.3% |
| Illinois 9 | D+15 | Jan Schakowsky | Democratic | 1998 | Incumbent re-elected. | ▌ ✓ Jan Schakowsky (Democratic) 66.1%; ▌Tim Wolfe (Republican) 33.9% |
| Illinois 10 | D+8 | Robert Dold | Republican | 2010 | Incumbent lost re-election. Democratic gain. | ▌ ✓ Brad Schneider (Democratic) 50.5%; ▌Robert Dold (Republican) 49.5% |
| Illinois 11 | D+6 | Judy Biggert; Redistricted from the 13th district | Republican | 1998 | Incumbent lost re-election. Democratic gain. | ▌ ✓ Bill Foster (Democratic) 58.1%; ▌Judy Biggert (Republican) 41.9% |
| Illinois 12 | D+2 | Jerry Costello | Democratic | 1988 | Incumbent retired. Democratic hold. | ▌ ✓ William Enyart (Democratic) 51.5%; ▌Jason Plummer (Republican) 42.9%; ▌Paula Bradshaw (Green) 5.6% |
| Illinois 13 | D+1 | Tim Johnson; Redistricted from the 15th district | Republican | 2000 | Incumbent renominated but withdrew. Republican hold. | ▌ ✓ Rodney Davis (Republican) 46.6%; ▌David Gill (Democratic) 46.2%; ▌John Hartman (Independent) 7.2% |
| Illinois 14 | R+6 | Randy Hultgren | Republican | 2010 | Incumbent re-elected. | ▌ ✓ Randy Hultgren (Republican) 58.8%; ▌Dennis Anderson (Democratic) 41.2% |
| Illinois 15 | R+11 | John Shimkus; Redistricted from the 19th district | Republican | 1996 | Incumbent re-elected. | ▌ ✓ John Shimkus (Republican) 68.9%; ▌Angela Michael (Democratic) 31.1% |
| Illinois 16 | R+4 | Don Manzullo | Republican | 1992 | Incumbent lost renomination. Republican loss. | ▌ ✓ Adam Kinzinger (Republican) 61.9%; ▌Wanda Rohl (Democratic) 38.1% |
| Illinois 16 | R+4 | Adam Kinzinger; Redistricted from the 11th district | Republican | 2010 | Incumbent re-elected. | ▌ ✓ Adam Kinzinger (Republican) 61.9%; ▌Wanda Rohl (Democratic) 38.1% |
| Illinois 17 | D+6 | Bobby Schilling | Republican | 2010 | Incumbent lost re-election. Democratic gain. | ▌ ✓ Cheri Bustos (Democratic) 53.3%; ▌Bobby Schilling (Republican) 46.7% |
| Illinois 18 | R+10 | Aaron Schock | Republican | 2008 | Incumbent re-elected. | ▌ ✓ Aaron Schock (Republican) 74.2%; ▌Steve Waterworth (Democratic) 25.8% |

== Indiana ==
| District | PVI | Incumbent | Party | First elected | Result | Candidates |
|---|---|---|---|---|---|---|
| Indiana 1 | D+9 | Pete Visclosky | Democratic | 1984 | Incumbent re-elected. | ▌ ✓ Pete Visclosky (Democratic) 67.3%; ▌Joel Phelps (Republican) 32.7% |
| Indiana 2 | R+7 | Joe Donnelly | Democratic | 2006 | Incumbent retired to run for U.S. senator. Republican gain. | ▌ ✓ Jackie Walorski (Republican) 49.0%; ▌Brendan Mullen (Democratic) 47.6%; ▌Joe Ruiz (Libertarian) 3.4% |
| Indiana 3 | R+13 | Marlin Stutzman | Republican | 2010 | Incumbent re-elected. | ▌ ✓ Marlin Stutzman (Republican) 67.1%; ▌Kevin Boyd (Democratic) 32.9% |
| Indiana 4 | R+13 | Todd Rokita | Republican | 2010 | Incumbent re-elected. | ▌ ✓ Todd Rokita (Republican) 61.9%; ▌Tara Nelson (Democratic) 34.2%; ▌Benjamin Gehlhausen (Libertarian) 3.9% |
| Indiana 5 | R+11 | Dan Burton | Republican | 1982 | Incumbent retired. Republican hold. | ▌ ✓ Susan Brooks (Republican) 58.4%; ▌Scott Reske (Democratic) 37.6%; ▌Chard Reid (Libertarian) 4.0% |
| Indiana 6 | R+12 | Mike Pence | Republican | 2000 | Incumbent retired to run for Governor of Indiana. Republican hold. | ▌ ✓ Luke Messer (Republican) 59.1%; ▌Brad Bookout (Democratic) 35.1%; ▌Rex Bell (Libertarian) 5.8% |
| Indiana 7 | D+9 | André Carson | Democratic | 2008 (special) | Incumbent re-elected. | ▌ ✓ André Carson (Democratic) 62.8%; ▌Carlos May (Republican) 37.2% |
| Indiana 8 | R+8 | Larry Bucshon | Republican | 2010 | Incumbent re-elected. | ▌ ✓ Larry Bucshon (Republican) 53.4%; ▌Dave Crooks (Democratic) 43.1%; ▌Bart Gadau (Libertarian) 3.6% |
| Indiana 9 | R+9 | Todd Young | Republican | 2010 | Incumbent re-elected. | ▌ ✓ Todd Young (Republican) 56.3%; ▌Shelli Yoder (Democratic) 43.7% |

== Iowa ==
Iowa's results

Iowa lost one seat in reapportionment, forcing a pair of incumbents, a Democrat and a Republican, into the same district.

| District | PVI | Incumbent | Party | First elected | Result | Candidates |
|---|---|---|---|---|---|---|
| Iowa 1 | D+5 | Bruce Braley | Democratic | 2006 | Incumbent re-elected. | ▌ ✓ Bruce Braley (Democratic) 56.9%; ▌Ben Lange (Republican) 41.7%; ▌Greg Hughes (Independent) 1.2%; ▌George Krail (Independent) 0.2% |
| Iowa 2 | D+4 | Dave Loebsack | Democratic | 2006 | Incumbent re-elected. | ▌ ✓ Dave Loebsack (Democratic) 55.4%; ▌John Archer (Republican) 42.5%; ▌Alan Aversa (Independent) 2.2% |
| Iowa 3 | R+1 | Leonard Boswell | Democratic | 1996 | Incumbent lost re-election. Democratic loss. | ▌ ✓ Tom Latham (Republican) 52.3%; ▌Leonard Boswell (Democratic) 43.6%; ▌Scott Batcher (Ind. Republican) 2.4%; ▌David Rosenfield (Socialist Workers) 1.6% |
| Iowa 3 | R+1 | Tom Latham; Redistricted from the 4th district | Republican | 1994 | Incumbent re-elected. | ▌ ✓ Tom Latham (Republican) 52.3%; ▌Leonard Boswell (Democratic) 43.6%; ▌Scott Batcher (Ind. Republican) 2.4%; ▌David Rosenfield (Socialist Workers) 1.6% |
| Iowa 4 | R+4 | Steve King; Redistricted from the 5th district | Republican | 2002 | Incumbent re-elected. | ▌ ✓ Steve King (Republican) 53.2%; ▌Christie Vilsack (Democratic) 44.6%; ▌Martin Monroe (Independent) 2.1% |

== Kansas ==
Primary elections were held August 7, 2012.

| District | PVI | Incumbent | Party | First elected | Result | Candidates |
|---|---|---|---|---|---|---|
| Kansas 1 | R+22 | Tim Huelskamp | Republican | 2010 | Incumbent re-elected. | ▌ ✓ Tim Huelskamp (Republican); Uncontested |
| Kansas 2 | R+7 | Lynn Jenkins | Republican | 2008 | Incumbent re-elected. | ▌ ✓ Lynn Jenkins (Republican) 57.0%; ▌Tobias Schlingensiepen (Democratic) 38.7%; ▌Dennis Hawver (Libertarian) 4.3% |
| Kansas 3 | R+5 | Kevin Yoder | Republican | 2010 | Incumbent re-elected. | ▌ ✓ Kevin Yoder (Republican) 68.5%; ▌Joel Balam (Libertarian) 31.5% |
| Kansas 4 | R+14 | Mike Pompeo | Republican | 2010 | Incumbent re-elected. | ▌ ✓ Mike Pompeo (Republican) 62.2%; ▌Robert Tillman (Democratic) 31.6%; ▌Thomas Jefferson (Libertarian) 6.2% |

== Kentucky ==
| District | PVI | Incumbent | Party | First elected | Result | Candidates |
|---|---|---|---|---|---|---|
| Kentucky 1 | R+14 | Ed Whitfield | Republican | 1994 | Incumbent re-elected. | ▌ ✓ Ed Whitfield (Republican) 69.6%; ▌Charles Hatchett (Democratic) 30.4% |
| Kentucky 2 | R+15 | Brett Guthrie | Republican | 2008 | Incumbent re-elected. | ▌ ✓ Brett Guthrie (Republican) 64.3%; ▌David Williams (Democratic) 31.7%; ▌Andrew Beacham (Independent) 2.2%; ▌Craig Astor (Libertarian) 1.7% |
| Kentucky 3 | D+3 | John Yarmuth | Democratic | 2006 | Incumbent re-elected. | ▌ ✓ John Yarmuth (Democratic) 64.0%; ▌Brooks Wicker (Republican) 34.5%; ▌Bob DeVore (Independent) 1.5% |
| Kentucky 4 | R+15 | Vacant | | | Incumbent Geoff Davis (R) resigned July 31, 2012; Republican hold. Winner also elected to fill unexpired term, see above. | ▌ ✓ Thomas Massie (Republican) 62.1%; ▌Bill Adkins (Democratic) 35.0%; ▌David Lewis (Independent) 3.4% |
| Kentucky 5 | R+16 | Hal Rogers | Republican | 1980 | Incumbent re-elected. | ▌ ✓ Hal Rogers (Republican) 77.9%; ▌Ken Stepp (Democratic) 22.1% |
| Kentucky 6 | R+7 | Ben Chandler | Democratic | 2004 (special) | Incumbent lost re-election. Republican gain. | ▌ ✓ Andy Barr (Republican) 50.6%; ▌Ben Chandler (Democratic) 46.7%; ▌Randolph Vance (Independent) 2.8% |

== Louisiana ==
Louisiana lost one seat in reapportionment, forcing a pair of incumbent Republicans into the same district.

| District | PVI | Incumbent | Party | First elected | Result | Candidates |
|---|---|---|---|---|---|---|
| Louisiana 1 | R+23 | Steve Scalise | Republican | 2008 (special) | Incumbent re-elected. | ▌ ✓ Steve Scalise (Republican) 66.6%; ▌M.V. Mendoza (Democratic) 21.3%; ▌Gary King (Republican) 8.5%; ▌David Turknett (Independent) 2.1%; ▌Arden Wells (Independent) 1.5% |
| Louisiana 2 | D+22 | Cedric Richmond | Democratic | 2010 | Incumbent re-elected. | ▌ ✓ Cedric Richmond (Democratic) 55.2%; ▌Gary Landrieu (Democratic) 25.0%; ▌Dwayne Bailey (Republican) 13.5%; ▌Josue Larose (Republican) 4.0%; ▌Caleb Trotter (Libertarian) 2.4% |
| Louisiana 3 | R+15 | Jeff Landry | Republican | 2010 | Incumbent lost re-election Republican loss. | ▌ ✓ Charles Boustany (Republican) 60.9%; ▌Jeff Landry (Republican) 39.1% |
| Louisiana 3 | R+15 | Charles Boustany; Redistricted from the 7th district | Republican | 2004 | Incumbent re-elected. | ▌ ✓ Charles Boustany (Republican) 60.9%; ▌Jeff Landry (Republican) 39.1% |
| Louisiana 4 | R+11 | John Fleming | Republican | 2008 | Incumbent re-elected. | ▌ ✓ John Fleming (Republican) 75.3%; ▌Randall Lord (Libertarian) 24.7% |
| Louisiana 5 | R+14 | Rodney Alexander | Republican | 2002 (Note: Alexander was first elected as a Democrat. He became a Republican in August 2004.) | Incumbent re-elected. | ▌ ✓ Rodney Alexander (Republican) 77.8%; ▌Ron Caesar (Independent) 14.4%; ▌Clay Grant (Libertarian) 7.8% |
| Louisiana 6 | R+19 | Bill Cassidy | Republican | 2008 | Incumbent re-elected. | ▌ ✓ Bill Cassidy (Republican) 79.0%; ▌Rufus Craig (Libertarian) 10.5%; ▌Richard Torregano (Independent) 10.1% |

== Maine ==
| District | PVI | Incumbent | Party | First elected | Result | Candidates |
|---|---|---|---|---|---|---|
| Maine 1 | D+8 | Chellie Pingree | Democratic | 2008 | Incumbent re-elected. | ▌ ✓ Chellie Pingree (Democratic) 64.7%; ▌Jonathan Courtney (Republican) 35.3% |
| Maine 2 | D+3 | Mike Michaud | Democratic | 2002 | Incumbent re-elected. | ▌ ✓ Mike Michaud (Democratic) 58.1%; ▌Kevin Raye (Republican) 41.9% |

== Maryland ==
| District | PVI | Incumbent | Party | First elected | Result | Candidates |
|---|---|---|---|---|---|---|
| Maryland 1 | R+14 | Andy Harris | Republican | 2010 | Incumbent re-elected. | ▌ ✓ Andy Harris (Republican) 63.4%; ▌Wendy Rosen (Democratic) 27.5%; ▌John LaFerla (Democratic write-in) 4.4%; ▌Muir Boda (Libertarian) 3.8% |
| Maryland 2 | D+7 | Dutch Ruppersberger | Democratic | 2002 | Incumbent re-elected. | ▌ ✓ Dutch Ruppersberger (Democratic) 65.6%; ▌Nancy Jacobs (Republican) 31.1%; ▌Leo Dymowsk (Libertarian) 3.2% |
| Maryland 3 | D+7 | John Sarbanes | Democratic | 2006 | Incumbent re-elected. | ▌ ✓ John Sarbanes (Democratic) 66.8%; ▌Eric Knowles (Republican) 29.6%; ▌Paul Drgos (Libertarian) 3.4% |
| Maryland 4 | D+23 | Donna Edwards | Democratic | 2008 (special) | Incumbent re-elected. | ▌ ✓ Donna Edwards (Democratic) 77.2%; ▌Faith Loudon (Republican) 20.7%; ▌Scott Soffen (Libertarian) 2.0% |
| Maryland 5 | D+11 | Steny Hoyer | Democratic | 1981 (special) | Incumbent re-elected. | ▌ ✓ Steny Hoyer (Democratic) 69.4%; ▌Tony O'Donnell (Republican) 27.7%; ▌Bob Auerbach (Green) 1.5%; ▌Arvin Vohra (Libertarian) 1.3% |
| Maryland 6 | D+2 | Roscoe Bartlett | Republican | 1992 | Incumbent lost re-election. Democratic gain. | ▌ ✓ John Delaney (Democratic) 58.8%; ▌Roscoe Bartlett (Republican) 37.9%; ▌Nick Mueller (Libertarian) 3.2% |
| Maryland 7 | D+23 | Elijah Cummings | Democratic | 1996 | Incumbent re-elected. | ▌ ✓ Elijah Cummings (Democratic) 76.5%; ▌Frank Mirabile (Republican) 20.8%; ▌Ron Owens-Bey (Libertarian) 2.5% |
| Maryland 8 | D+10 | Chris Van Hollen | Democratic | 2002 | Incumbent re-elected. | ▌ ✓ Chris Van Hollen (Democratic) 63.4%; ▌Kenneth R. Timmerman (Republican) 32.9%; ▌Mark Grannis (Libertarian) 2.1%; ▌George Gluck (Green) 1.5% |

== Massachusetts ==
Massachusetts lost one seat in reapportionment, forcing a pair of incumbent Democrats into the same district, although one, John Olver, retired in advance of the legislature's approval of new maps. Primary elections were held September 6, 2012.

| District | PVI | Incumbent | Party | First elected | Result | Candidates |
|---|---|---|---|---|---|---|
| Massachusetts 1 | D+13 | Richard Neal; Redistricted from the 2nd district | Democratic | 1988 | Incumbent re-elected. | ▌ ✓ Richard Neal (Democratic); Uncontested |
| Massachusetts 2 | D+10 | John Olver; Redistricted from the 1st district | Democratic | 1991 (Special) | Incumbent retired. Democratic loss. | ▌ ✓ Jim McGovern (Democratic); Uncontested |
| Massachusetts 2 | D+10 | Jim McGovern; Redistricted from the 3rd district | Democratic | 1996 | Incumbent re-elected. | ▌ ✓ Jim McGovern (Democratic); Uncontested |
| Massachusetts 3 | D+8 | Niki Tsongas; Redistricted from the 5th district | Democratic | 2007 (special) | Incumbent re-elected. | ▌ ✓ Niki Tsongas (Democratic) 65.9%; ▌Jon Golnik (Republican) 34.1% |
| Massachusetts 4 | D+10 | Barney Frank | Democratic | 1980 | Incumbent retired. Democratic hold. | ▌ ✓ Joe Kennedy III (Democratic) 61.1%; ▌Sean Bielat (Republican) 36.0% |
| Massachusetts 5 | D+16 | Ed Markey; Redistricted from the 7th district | Democratic | 1976 | Incumbent re-elected. | ▌ ✓ Ed Markey (Democratic) 75.5%; ▌Tom Tierney (Republican) 24.5% |
| Massachusetts 6 | D+7 | John F. Tierney | Democratic | 1996 | Incumbent re-elected. | ▌ ✓ John F. Tierney (Democratic) 48.3%; ▌Richard Tisei (Republican) 47.3%; ▌Daniel Fishman (Libertarian) 4.5% |
| Massachusetts 7 | D+30 | Mike Capuano; Redistricted from the 8th district | Democratic | 1998 | Incumbent re-elected. | ▌ ✓ Mike Capuano (Democratic) 83.6%; ▌Karla Romero (Independent) 16.4% |
| Massachusetts 8 | D+9 | Stephen Lynch; Redistricted from the 9th district | Democratic | 2001 (special) | Incumbent re-elected. | ▌ ✓ Stephen Lynch (Democratic) 76.3%; ▌Joe Selvaggi (Republican) 23.7% |
| Massachusetts 9 | D+8 | Bill Keating; Redistricted from the 10th district | Democratic | 2010 | Incumbent re-elected. | ▌ ✓ Bill Keating (Democratic) 58.3%; ▌Christopher Sheldon (Republican) 32.2%; ▌Daniel Botelho (Independent) 9.0% |

== Michigan ==
Michigan lost one seat in reapportionment, forcing a pair of Democrats into the same district. Primary elections were held August 7, 2012.

| District | PVI | Incumbent | Party | First elected | Result | Candidates |
|---|---|---|---|---|---|---|
| Michigan 1 | R+4 | Dan Benishek | Republican | 2010 | Incumbent re-elected. | ▌ ✓ Dan Benishek (Republican) 48.2%; ▌Gary McDowell (Democratic) 47.5%; ▌Emily Salvette (Libertarian) 3.2%; ▌Ellis Boal (Green) 1.2% |
| Michigan 2 | R+7 | Bill Huizenga | Republican | 2010 | Incumbent re-elected. | ▌ ✓ Bill Huizenga (Republican) 61.1%; ▌Willie German (Democratic) 34.2%; ▌Mary Buzuma (Libertarian) 2.8%; ▌Ron Graeser (US Taxpayers) 1.0%; ▌Bill Opalicky (Green) 1.0% |
| Michigan 3 | R+5 | Justin Amash | Republican | 2010 | Incumbent re-elected. | ▌ ✓ Justin Amash (Republican) 52.7%; ▌Steve Pestka (Democratic) 44.1%; ▌Bill Gelineau (Libertarian) 3.2% |
| Michigan 4 | R+4 | Dave Camp | Republican | 1990 | Incumbent re-elected. | ▌ ✓ Dave Camp (Republican) 63.1%; ▌Debra Freidell Wirth (Democratic) 33.5%; ▌John Gelineau (Libertarian) 1.4%; ▌George Zimmer (US Taxpayers) 1.1%; ▌Pat Timmons (Green) 0.9% |
| Michigan 5 | D+10 | Dale Kildee | Democratic | 1976 | Incumbent retired. Democratic hold. | ▌ ✓ Dan Kildee (Democratic) 64.2%; ▌Jim Slezak (Republican) 32.2%; ▌David Davenport (Independent) 2.1%; ▌Greg Creswell (Libertarian) 1.6% |
| Michigan 6 | R+1 | Fred Upton | Republican | 1986 | Incumbent re-elected. | ▌ ✓ Fred Upton (Republican) 54.4%; ▌Mike O'Brien (Democratic) 42.8%; ▌Christie Gelineau (Libertarian) 2.0%; ▌Jason Gatties (US Taxpayers) 0.8% |
| Michigan 7 | R+3 | Tim Walberg | Republican | 2006; 2008 (defeated); 2010 | Incumbent re-elected. | ▌ ✓ Tim Walberg (Republican) 53.3%; ▌Kurt Haskell (Democratic) 43.0%; ▌Ken Proctor (Libertarian) 2.5%; ▌Richard Wunsch (Green) 1.1% |
| Michigan 8 | R+2 | Mike Rogers | Republican | 2000 | Incumbent re-elected. | ▌ ✓ Mike Rogers (Republican) 58.6%; ▌Lance Enderle (Democratic) 37.3%; ▌Daniel Goebel (Libertarian) 2.3%; ▌Preston Brooks (Independent) 1.8% |
| Michigan 9 | D+5 | Sander Levin; Redistricted from the 12th district | Democratic | 1982 | Incumbent re-elected. | ▌ ✓ Sander Levin (Democratic) 61.9%; ▌Don Volaric (Republican) 34.0%; ▌Jim Fulner (Libertarian) 1.8%; ▌Julia Williams (Green) 1.4%; ▌Les Townsend (US Taxypayers) 0.9% |
| Michigan 10 | R+5 | Candice Miller | Republican | 2002 | Incumbent re-elected. | ▌ ✓ Candice Miller (Republican) 68.7%; ▌Chuck Stadler (Democratic) 29.8%; ▌Bob Dashairya (Libertarian) 1.5% |
| Michigan 11 | R+4 | Vacant | | | Thad McCotter (R) resigned July 6, 2012, after failing to qualify for renomination. New member elected. Republican hold. Winner was not elected the same day to finish the current term, see above. | ▌ ✓ Kerry Bentivolio (Republican) 50.7%; ▌Syed Taj (Democratic) 44.4%; ▌John Tatar (Libertarian) 2.7%; ▌Steven Paul Duke (Green) 1.3%; ▌Daniel Johnson (Natural Law) 0.9% |
| Michigan 12 | D+14 | John Dingell; Redistricted from the 15th district | Democratic | 1955 (special) | Incumbent re-elected. | ▌ ✓ John Dingell (Democratic) 68.5%; ▌Cynthia Kallgren (Republican) 28.4%; ▌Rick Secula (Libertarian) 3.1% |
| Michigan 13 | D+34 | John Conyers Jr. Redistricted from the 14th district | Democratic | 1964 | Incumbent re-elected. | ▌ ✓ John Conyers Jr. (Democratic) 81.5%; ▌Harry Sawicki (Republican) 14.7%; ▌Chris Sharer (Libertarian) 2.3%; ▌Martin Gray (U.S. Taxpayers) 1.5% |
| Michigan 14 | D+27 | Gary Peters; Redistricted from the 9th district | Democratic | 2008 | Incumbent re-elected. | ▌ ✓ Gary Peters (Democratic) 85.1%; ▌John Hauler (Republican) 16.4%; ▌Leonard Schwartz (Libertarian) 1.2%; ▌Douglas Campbell (Green) 0.9% |
| Michigan 14 | D+27 | Hansen Clarke; Redistricted from the 13th district | Democratic | 2010 | Incumbent lost renomination. Democratic loss. | ▌ ✓ Gary Peters (Democratic) 85.1%; ▌John Hauler (Republican) 16.4%; ▌Leonard Schwartz (Libertarian) 1.2%; ▌Douglas Campbell (Green) 0.9% |

== Minnesota ==
| District | PVI | Incumbent | Party | First elected | Result | Candidates |
|---|---|---|---|---|---|---|
| Minnesota 1 | R+1 | Tim Walz | DFL | 2006 | Incumbent re-elected. | ▌ ✓ Tim Walz (DFL) 57.6%; ▌Allen Quist (Republican) 42.4% |
| Minnesota 2 | R+2 | John Kline | Republican | 2002 | Incumbent re-elected. | ▌ ✓ John Kline (Republican) 54.1%; ▌Mike Obermueller (DFL) 45.9% |
| Minnesota 3 | R+2 | Erik Paulsen | Republican | 2008 | Incumbent re-elected. | ▌ ✓ Erik Paulsen (Republican) 58.2%; ▌Brian Barnes (DFL) 41.8% |
| Minnesota 4 | D+11 | Betty McCollum | DFL | 2000 | Incumbent re-elected. | ▌ ✓ Betty McCollum (DFL) 62.4%; ▌Tony Hernandez (Republican) 31.6%; ▌Steve Carlson (Independence) 6.1% |
| Minnesota 5 | D+22 | Keith Ellison | DFL | 2006 | Incumbent re-elected. | ▌ ✓ Keith Ellison (DFL) 74.5%; ▌Chris Fields (Republican) 25.5% |
| Minnesota 6 | R+8 | Michele Bachmann | Republican | 2006 | Incumbent re-elected. | ▌ ✓ Michele Bachmann (Republican) 50.6%; ▌Jim Graves (DFL) 49.4% |
| Minnesota 7 | R+5 | Collin Peterson | DFL | 1990 | Incumbent re-elected. | ▌ ✓ Collin Peterson (DFL) 60.4%; ▌Lee Byberg (Republican) 34.9%; ▌Adam Steele (Independence) 4.7% |
| Minnesota 8 | D+3 | Chip Cravaack | Republican | 2010 | Incumbent lost re-election. DFL gain. | ▌ ✓ Rick Nolan (DFL) 54.5%; ▌Chip Cravaack (Republican) 45.5% |

== Mississippi ==
| District | PVI | Incumbent | Party | First elected | Result | Candidates |
|---|---|---|---|---|---|---|
| Mississippi 1 | R+14 | Alan Nunnelee | Republican | 2010 | Incumbent re-elected. | ▌ ✓ Alan Nunnelee (Republican) 60.4%; ▌Brad Morris (Democratic) 36.7%; ▌Danny Bedwell (Libertarian) 1.2%; ▌Jim Bourland (Constitution) 0.8%; ▌Jim Chris Potts (Reform) 0.8% |
| Mississippi 2 | D+10 | Bennie Thompson | Democratic | 1992 | Incumbent re-elected. | ▌ ✓ Bennie Thompson (Democratic) 67.1%; ▌Bill Marcy (Republican) 31.0%; ▌Cobby Williams (Independent) 1.4%; ▌Lajena Williams (Reform) 0.5% |
| Mississippi 3 | R+15 | Gregg Harper | Republican | 2008 | Incumbent re-elected. | ▌ ✓ Gregg Harper (Republican) 80.0%; ▌John Pannell (Reform) 20.0% |
| Mississippi 4 | R+20 | Steven Palazzo | Republican | 2010 | Incumbent re-elected. | ▌ ✓ Steven Palazzo (Republican) 64.1%; ▌Matthew Moore (Democratic) 28.9%; ▌Ron Williams (Libertarian) 6.3%; ▌Bob Claunch (Reform) 0.7% |

== Missouri ==
Missouri lost one seat in reapportionment; two Democrats were drawn into the same district as a result. Primary elections were held August 7, 2012.

| District | PVI | Incumbent | Party | First elected | Result | Candidates |
|---|---|---|---|---|---|---|
| Missouri 1 | D+27 | Lacy Clay | Democratic | 2000 | Incumbent re-elected. | ▌ ✓ Lacy Clay (Democratic) 78.7%; ▌Robyn Hamlin (Republican) 17.9%; ▌Robb Cunningham (Libertarian) 3.5% |
| Missouri 1 | D+27 | Russ Carnahan; Redistricted from the 3rd district | Democratic | 2004 | Incumbent lost renomination. Democratic loss. | ▌ ✓ Lacy Clay (Democratic) 78.7%; ▌Robyn Hamlin (Republican) 17.9%; ▌Robb Cunningham (Libertarian) 3.5% |
| Missouri 2 | R+7 | Todd Akin | Republican | 2000 | Incumbent retired to run for U.S. senator. Republican hold. | ▌ ✓ Ann Wagner (Republican) 60.1%; ▌Glenn Koenen (Democratic) 37.1%; ▌Bill Slantz (Libertarian) 2.3%; ▌Anitol Zorikova (Constitution) 0.5% |
| Missouri 3 | R+9 | Blaine Luetkemeyer; Redistricted from the 9th district | Republican | 2008 | Incumbent re-elected. | ▌ ✓ Blaine Luetkemeyer (Republican) 63.5%; ▌Eric Mayer (Democratic) 32.9%; ▌Steve Wilson (Libertarian) 3.7% |
| Missouri 4 | R+11 | Vicky Hartzler | Republican | 2010 | Incumbent re-elected. | ▌ ✓ Vicky Hartzler (Republican) 60.3%; ▌Teresa Hensley (Democratic) 35.5%; ▌Thomas Holbrook (Libertarian) 3.3%; ▌Greg Cowan (Constitution) 0.9% |
| Missouri 5 | D+10 | Emanuel Cleaver | Democratic | 2004 | Incumbent re-elected. | ▌ ✓ Emanuel Cleaver (Democratic) 60.5%; ▌Jacob Turk (Republican) 36.9%; ▌Randy Langkraehr (Libertarian) 2.6% |
| Missouri 6 | R+9 | Sam Graves | Republican | 2000 | Incumbent re-elected. | ▌ ✓ Sam Graves (Republican) 65.0%; ▌Kyle Yarber (Democratic) 32.5%; ▌Russ Lee Monchil (Libertarian) 2.5% |
| Missouri 7 | R+17 | Billy Long | Republican | 2010 | Incumbent re-elected. | ▌ ✓ Billy Long (Republican) 63.9%; ▌Jim Evans (Democratic) 30.9%; ▌Kevin Craig (Libertarian) 5.2% |
| Missouri 8 | R+13 | Jo Ann Emerson | Republican | 1996 | Incumbent re-elected. | ▌ ✓ Jo Ann Emerson (Republican) 71.9%; ▌Jack Rushin (Democratic) 24.6%; ▌Rick Vandeven (Libertarian) 3.5% |

== Montana ==
| District | PVI | Incumbent | Party | First elected | Result | Candidates |
|---|---|---|---|---|---|---|
| Montana at-large | R+7 | Denny Rehberg | Republican | 2000 | Incumbent retired to run for U.S. senator. Republican hold. | ▌ ✓ Steve Daines (Republican) 53.2%; ▌Kim Gillan (Democratic) 42.9%; ▌David Kaiser (Libertarian) 4.0% |

== Nebraska ==
| District | PVI | Incumbent | Party | First elected | Result | Candidates |
|---|---|---|---|---|---|---|
| Nebraska 1 | R+11 | Jeff Fortenberry | Republican | 2004 | Incumbent re-elected. | ▌ ✓ Jeff Fortenberry (Republican) 68.3%; ▌Korey Reiman (Democratic) 31.7% |
| Nebraska 2 | R+6 | Lee Terry | Republican | 1998 | Incumbent re-elected. | ▌ ✓ Lee Terry (Republican) 51.2%; ▌John Ewing (Democratic) 48.8% |
| Nebraska 3 | R+23 | Adrian Smith | Republican | 2006 | Incumbent re-elected. | ▌ ✓ Adrian Smith (Republican) 74.2%; ▌Mark Sullivan (Democratic) 25.8% |

== Nevada ==
Nevada gained one seat in reapportionment.

| District | PVI | Incumbent | Party | First elected | Result | Candidates |
|---|---|---|---|---|---|---|
| Nevada 1 | D+11 | Shelley Berkley | Democratic | 1998 | Incumbent retired to run for U.S. senator. Democratic hold. | ▌ ✓ Dina Titus (Democratic) 63.6%; ▌Chris Edwards (Republican) 31.5%; ▌Bill Pojunis (Libertarian) 2.6%; ▌Stan Vaughan (Independent American) 2.3% |
| Nevada 2 | R+5 | Mark Amodei | Republican | 2011 (special) | Incumbent re-elected. | ▌ ✓ Mark Amodei (Republican) 57.6%; ▌Sam Koepnick (Democratic) 36.2%; ▌Michael Haines (Independent) 4.0%; ▌Russell Best (Independent American) 2.2% |
| Nevada 3 | EVEN | Joe Heck | Republican | 2010 | Incumbent re-elected. | ▌ ✓ Joe Heck (Republican) 50.4%; ▌John Oceguera (Democratic) 42.9%; ▌Tim Murphy (Independent) 4.7%; ▌Tom Jones (Independent American) 2.0% |
| Nevada 4 | D+2 | None (New seat) | | | New seat. Democratic gain. | ▌ ✓ Steven Horsford (Democratic) 50.1%; ▌Danny Tarkanian (Republican) 42.1%; ▌Floyd Fitzgibbons (Independent American) 3.9%; ▌Joe Silvestri (Libertarian) 3.9% |

== New Hampshire ==
| District | PVI | Incumbent | Party | First elected | Result | Candidates |
|---|---|---|---|---|---|---|
| New Hampshire 1 | EVEN | Frank Guinta | Republican | 2010 | Incumbent lost re-election. Democratic gain. | ▌ ✓ Carol Shea-Porter (Democratic) 49.7%; ▌Frank Guinta (Republican) 46.0%; ▌Brendan Kelly (Libertarian) 4.3% |
| New Hampshire 2 | D+3 | Charles Bass | Republican | 1994; 2006 (defeated); 2010 | Incumbent lost re-election. Democratic gain. | ▌ ✓ Annie Kuster (Democratic) 50.2%; ▌Charles Bass (Republican) 45.1%; ▌Hardy Macia (Libertarian) 4.7% |

== New Jersey ==
New Jersey lost one seat in reapportionment, forcing two incumbent Democrats into the same district.

| District | PVI | Incumbent | Party | First elected | Result | Candidates |
|---|---|---|---|---|---|---|
| New Jersey 1 | D+12 | Rob Andrews | Democratic | 1990 | Incumbent re-elected. | ▌ ✓ Rob Andrews (Democratic) 67.9%; ▌Greg Horton (Republican) 30.3%; ▌John Reitter (Green) 1.4%; ▌Margaret Chapman (Reform) 0.3% |
| New Jersey 2 | EVEN | Frank LoBiondo | Republican | 1994 | Incumbent re-elected. | ▌ ✓ Frank LoBiondo (Republican) 58.0%; ▌Cassandra Shober (Democratic) 40.0%; ▌John Ordille (Libertarian) 0.9%; ▌Charles Lukens (Independent) 0.5%; ▌David Bowen (Independent) 0.3%; ▌Frank Faralli Jr. (Independent) 0.2% |
| New Jersey 3 | R+2 | Jon Runyan | Republican | 2010 | Incumbent re-elected. | ▌ ✓ Jon Runyan (Republican) 53.8%; ▌Shelley Adler (Democratic) 44.8%; ▌Robert Forchin (Independent) 0.7%; ▌Robert Shapiro (Independent) 0.4%; ▌Fredrick Lavergne (Independent) 0.2% |
| New Jersey 4 | R+7 | Chris Smith | Republican | 1980 | Incumbent re-elected. | ▌ ✓ Chris Smith (Republican) 68.8%; ▌Brian Froelich (Democratic) 31.0%; ▌Leonard Marshall (Independent) 1.1% |
| New Jersey 5 | R+4 | Scott Garrett | Republican | 2002 | Incumbent re-elected. | ▌ ✓ Scott Garrett (Republican) 55.5%; ▌Adam Gussen (Democratic) 42.4%; ▌Patricia Alessandrini (Green) 2.2% |
| New Jersey 6 | D+6 | Frank Pallone | Democratic | 1988 | Incumbent re-elected. | ▌ ✓ Frank Pallone (Democratic) 63.3%; ▌Anna Little (Republican) 35.2%; ▌Len Flynn (Libertarian) 0.6%; ▌Karen Zaletel (Independent) 0.4%; ▌Mac Lyden (Independent) 0.4%; ▌Herbert Tarbous (Reform) 0.2% |
| New Jersey 7 | R+6 | Leonard Lance | Republican | 2008 | Incumbent re-elected. | ▌ ✓ Leonard Lance (Republican) 57.2%; ▌Upendra Chivukula (Democratic) 40.0%; ▌Dennis Breen (Independent) 1.5%; ▌Patrick McKnight (Libertarian) 1.3% |
| New Jersey 8 | D+20 | Albio Sires; Redistricted from the 13th district | Democratic | 2006 | Incumbent re-elected. | ▌ ✓ Albio Sires (Democratic) 78.1%; ▌María Piñeiro Karczewski (Republican) 18.9%; ▌Herbert Shaw (Independent) 1.1%; ▌Stephen De Luca (Independent) 1.0%; ▌Pablo Olivera (Independent) 1.0% |
| New Jersey 9 | D+11 | Steve Rothman | Democratic | 1996 | Incumbent lost renomination. Democratic loss. | ▌ ✓ Bill Pascrell (Democratic) 73.6%; ▌Shmuley Boteach (Republican) 25.4%; ▌David Smith (Independent) 0.5%; ▌Jeanette Woolsey (Constitution) 0.5% |
| New Jersey 9 | D+11 | Bill Pascrell; Redistricted from the 8th district | Democratic | 1996 | Incumbent re-elected. | ▌ ✓ Bill Pascrell (Democratic) 73.6%; ▌Shmuley Boteach (Republican) 25.4%; ▌David Smith (Independent) 0.5%; ▌Jeanette Woolsey (Constitution) 0.5% |
| New Jersey 10 | D+31 | Vacant | | | Donald M. Payne (D) died March 6, 2012. Democratic hold. Winner was also elected the same day to finish the current term, see above. | ▌ ✓ Donald Payne Jr. (Democratic) 87.3%; ▌Brian Kelemen (Republican) 10.8%; ▌Joanne Miller (Independent) 1.3%; ▌Mick Erickson (Libertarian) 0.5% |
| New Jersey 11 | R+5 | Rodney Frelinghuysen | Republican | 1994 | Incumbent re-elected. | ▌ ✓ Rodney Frelinghuysen (Republican) 58.9%; ▌John Arvanites (Democratic) 40.0%; ▌Barry Berlin (Independent) 1.1% |
| New Jersey 12 | D+12 | Rush Holt Jr. | Democratic | 1998 | Incumbent re-elected. | ▌ ✓ Rush Holt Jr. (Democratic) 69.2%; ▌Eric Beck (Republican) 29.5%; ▌Jack Freudenheim (Independent) 0.8%; ▌Ken Cody (Independent) 0.5% |

== New Mexico ==
| District | PVI | Incumbent | Party | First elected | Result | Candidates |
|---|---|---|---|---|---|---|
| New Mexico 1 | D+5 | Martin Heinrich | Democratic | 2008 | Incumbent retired to run for U.S. senator. Democratic hold. | ▌ ✓ Michelle Luján Grisham (Democratic) 59.1%; ▌Janice Arnold-Jones (Republican) 40.9% |
| New Mexico 2 | R+6 | Steve Pearce | Republican | 2002; 2008 (retired); 2010 | Incumbent re-elected. | ▌ ✓ Steve Pearce (Republican) 59.1%; ▌Evelyn Madrid Erhard (Democratic) 40.9% |
| New Mexico 3 | D+7 | Ben Ray Luján | Democratic | 2008 | Incumbent re-elected. | ▌ ✓ Ben Ray Luján (Democratic) 63.0%; ▌Jeff Byrd (Republican) 37.0% |

== New York ==
New York lost two seats in reapportionment. After the legislature failed to reach agreement, New York conducted its 2012 congressional elections under a map drawn by a federal magistrate judge. Two incumbent Representatives saw their districts eliminated; one, Maurice Hinchey, chose to retire, while the other, Bob Turner, chose to run for the U.S. Senate. A third incumbent impacted by redistricting, Gary Ackerman, chose to retire, creating an open seat.

| District | PVI | Incumbent | Party | First elected | Result | Candidates |
|---|---|---|---|---|---|---|
| New York 1 | EVEN | Tim Bishop | Democratic | 2002 | Incumbent re-elected. | ▌ ✓ Tim Bishop (Democratic) 52.2%; ▌Randy Altschuler (Republican) 47.8% |
| New York 2 | R+1 | Peter T. King; Redistricted from the 3rd district | Republican | 1992 | Incumbent re-elected. | ▌ ✓ Peter T. King (Republican) 58.7%; ▌Vivianne C. Falcone (Democratic) 41.3% |
| New York 3 | D+3 | Steve Israel; Redistricted from the 2nd district | Democratic | 2000 | Incumbent re-elected. | ▌ ✓ Steve Israel (Democratic) 57.5%; ▌Stephen Labate (Republican) 41.7%; ▌Mike McDermott (Libertarian) 0.6%; ▌Anthony Tolda (Constitution) 0.1% |
| New York 4 | D+4 | Carolyn McCarthy | Democratic | 1996 | Incumbent re-elected. | ▌ ✓ Carolyn McCarthy (Democratic) 61.7%; ▌Fran Becker (Republican) 32.4%; ▌Frank Scaturro (Conservative) 5.9% |
| New York 5 | D+33 | Gregory Meeks; Redistricted from the 6th district | Democratic | 1998 (special) | Incumbent re-elected. | ▌ ✓ Gregory Meeks (Democratic) 89.7%; ▌Allan Jennings (Republican) 9.6%; ▌Catherine Wark (Libertarian) 0.7% |
| New York 5 | D+33 | Bob Turner; Redistricted from the 9th district | Republican | 2011 (special) | Incumbent retired to run for U.S. senator. Republican loss. | ▌ ✓ Gregory Meeks (Democratic) 89.7%; ▌Allan Jennings (Republican) 9.6%; ▌Catherine Wark (Libertarian) 0.7% |
| New York 6 | D+12 | Gary Ackerman; Redistricted from the 5th district | Democratic | 1983 (special) | Incumbent retired. Democratic hold. | ▌ ✓ Grace Meng (Democratic) 67.7%; ▌Dan Halloran (Republican) 31.2%; ▌Evergreen Chou (Green) 1.2% |
| New York 7 | D+31 | Nydia Velázquez; Redistricted from the 12th district | Democratic | 1992 | Incumbent re-elected. | ▌ ✓ Nydia Velázquez (Democratic) 94.5%; ▌James Murray (Conservative) 5.5% |
| New York 8 | D+33 | Edolphus Towns; Redistricted from the 10th district | Democratic | 1982 | Incumbent retired. Democratic hold. | ▌ ✓ Hakeem Jeffries (Democratic) 90.0%; ▌Alan Bellone (Republican) 8.8%; ▌Colin Beavan (Green) 1.2% |
| New York 9 | D+31 | Yvette Clarke; Redistricted from the 11th district | Democratic | 2006 | Incumbent re-elected. | ▌ ✓ Yvette Clarke (Democratic) 87.0%; ▌Daniel Cavanagh (Republican) 11.6%; ▌Vivia Morgan (Green) 1.4% |
| New York 10 | D+24 | Jerry Nadler; Redistricted from the 8th district | Democratic | 1992 | Incumbent re-elected. | ▌ ✓ Jerry Nadler (Democratic) 80.7%; ▌Michael Chan (Republican) 19.3% |
| New York 11 | R+4 | Michael Grimm; Redistricted from the 13th district | Republican | 2010 | Incumbent re-elected. | ▌ ✓ Michael Grimm (Republican) 52.8%; ▌Mark Murphy (Democratic) 46.2%; ▌Hank Bardel (Green) 1.0% |
| New York 12 | D+38 | Carolyn Maloney; Redistricted from the 14th district | Democratic | 1992 | Incumbent re-elected. | ▌ ✓ Carolyn Maloney (Democratic) 80.9%; ▌Christopher Wight (Republican) 19.1% |
| New York 13 | D+41 | Charles Rangel; Redistricted from the 15th district | Democratic | 1970 | Incumbent re-elected. | ▌ ✓ Charles Rangel (Democratic) 90.8%; ▌Craig Schley (Republican) 6.3%; ▌Deborah Liatos (Socialist) 2.9%; ▌Kenneth D. Schaeffer (Working Families) |
| New York 14 | D+23 | Joe Crowley; Redistricted from the 7th district | Democratic | 1998 | Incumbent re-elected. | ▌ ✓ Joe Crowley (Democratic) 83.0%; ▌William Gibbons (Republican) 15.3%; ▌Tony Gronowicz (Green) 1.8% |
| New York 15 | D+41 | José E. Serrano; Redistricted from the 16th district | Democratic | 1990 | Incumbent re-elected. | ▌ ✓ José E. Serrano (Democratic) 97.1%; ▌Frank Della Valle (Republican) 2.9% |
| New York 16 | D+19 | Eliot Engel; Redistricted from the 17th district | Democratic | 1988 | Incumbent re-elected. | ▌ ✓ Eliot Engel (Democratic) 77.5%; ▌Joseph McLaughlin (Republican) 21.4%; ▌Joseph Diaferia (Green) 1.2% |
| New York 17 | D+5 | Nita Lowey; Redistricted from the 18th district | Democratic | 1988 | Incumbent re-elected. | ▌ ✓ Nita Lowey (Democratic) 64.2%; ▌Joe Carvin (Republican) 34.8%; ▌Francis Morganthaler (We The People) 1.0% |
| New York 18 | R+2 | Nan Hayworth; Redistricted from the 19th district | Republican | 2010 | Incumbent lost re-election. Democratic gain. | ▌ ✓ Sean Patrick Maloney (Democratic) 51.7%; ▌Nan Hayworth (Republican) 48.3% |
| New York 19 | EVEN | Chris Gibson; Redistricted from the 20th district | Republican | 2010 | Incumbent re-elected. | ▌ ✓ Chris Gibson (Republican) 53.4%; ▌Julian Schreibman (Democratic) 46.6% |
| New York 19 | EVEN | Maurice Hinchey; Redistricted from the 22nd district | Democratic | 1992 | Incumbent retired. Democratic loss. | ▌ ✓ Chris Gibson (Republican) 53.4%; ▌Julian Schreibman (Democratic) 46.6% |
| New York 20 | D+7 | Paul Tonko; Redistricted from the 21st district | Democratic | 2008 | Incumbent re-elected. | ▌ ✓ Paul Tonko (Democratic) 68.4%; ▌Bob Dieterich (Republican) 31.6% |
| New York 21 | R+2 | Bill Owens; Redistricted from the 23rd district | Democratic | 2009 (special) | Incumbent re-elected. | ▌ ✓ Bill Owens (Democratic) 50.2%; ▌Matt Doheny (Republican) 48.2%; ▌Donald Hassig (Green) 1.6% |
| New York 22 | R+3 | Richard Hanna; Redistricted from the 24th district | Republican | 2010 | Incumbent re-elected. | ▌ ✓ Richard Hanna (Republican) 60.9%; ▌Dan Lamb (Democratic) 39.1% |
| New York 23 | R+3 | Tom Reed; Redistricted from the 29th district | Republican | 2010 (special) | Incumbent re-elected. | ▌ ✓ Tom Reed (Republican) 52.1%; ▌Nate Shinagawa (Democratic) 47.9% |
| New York 24 | D+3 | Ann Marie Buerkle; Redistricted from the 25th district | Republican | 2010 | Incumbent lost re-election. Democratic gain. | ▌ ✓ Dan Maffei (Democratic) 48.4%; ▌Ann Marie Buerkle (Republican) 43.8%; ▌Ursula Rozum (Green) 7.9% |
| New York 25 | D+5 | Louise Slaughter; Redistricted from the 28th district | Democratic | 1986 | Incumbent re-elected. | ▌ ✓ Louise Slaughter (Democratic) 57.2%; ▌Maggie Brooks (Republican) 42.8% |
| New York 26 | D+13 | Brian Higgins; Redistricted from the 27th district | Democratic | 2004 | Incumbent re-elected. | ▌ ✓ Brian Higgins (Democratic) 74.6%; ▌Michael H. Madigan (Republican) 25.4% |
| New York 27 | R+7 | Kathy Hochul; Redistricted from the 26th district | Democratic | 2011 (special) | Incumbent lost re-election. Republican gain. | ▌ ✓ Chris Collins (Republican) 50.7%; ▌Kathy Hochul (Democratic) 49.3% |

== North Carolina ==
| District | PVI | Incumbent | Party | First elected | Result | Candidates |
|---|---|---|---|---|---|---|
| North Carolina 1 | D+17 | G. K. Butterfield | Democratic | 2004 | Incumbent re-elected. | ▌ ✓ G. K. Butterfield (Democratic) 75.2%; ▌Pete DiLauro (Republican) 23.0%; ▌Darryl Holloman (Libertarian) 1.8% |
| North Carolina 2 | R+11 | Renee Ellmers | Republican | 2010 | Incumbent re-elected. | ▌ ✓ Renee Ellmers (Republican) 55.9%; ▌Steve Wilkins (Democratic) 41.4%; ▌Brian Irving (Libertarian) 2.7% |
| North Carolina 3 | R+10 | Walter B. Jones Jr. | Republican | 1994 | Incumbent re-elected. | ▌ ✓ Walter B. Jones Jr. (Republican) 63.2%; ▌Erik Anderson (Democratic) 36.8% |
| North Carolina 4 | D+17 | David Price | Democratic | 1986; 1994 (defeated); 1996 | Incumbent re-elected. | ▌ ✓ David Price (Democratic) 74.4%; ▌Tim D'Annunzio (Republican) 25.6% |
| North Carolina 5 | R+12 | Virginia Foxx | Republican | 2004 | Incumbent re-elected. | ▌ ✓ Virginia Foxx (Republican) 57.5%; ▌Elisabeth Motsinger (Democratic) 42.5% |
| North Carolina 6 | R+11 | Howard Coble | Republican | 1984 | Incumbent re-elected. | ▌ ✓ Howard Coble (Republican) 60.9%; ▌Tony Foriest (Democratic) 39.1% |
| North Carolina 7 | R+11 | Mike McIntyre | Democratic | 1996 | Incumbent re-elected. | ▌ ✓ Mike McIntyre (Democratic) 50.1%; ▌David Rouzer (Republican) 49.9% |
| North Carolina 8 | R+12 | Larry Kissell | Democratic | 2008 | Incumbent lost re-election. Republican gain. | ▌ ✓ Richard Hudson (Republican) 54.1%; ▌Larry Kissell (Democratic) 45.9% |
| North Carolina 9 | R+10 | Sue Myrick | Republican | 1994 | Incumbent retired. Republican hold. | ▌ ✓ Robert Pittenger (Republican) 51.8%; ▌Jennifer Roberts (Democratic) 45.7%; ▌Curtis Campbell (Libertarian) 2.6% |
| North Carolina 10 | R+11 | Patrick McHenry | Republican | 2004 | Incumbent re-elected. | ▌ ✓ Patrick McHenry (Republican) 57.0%; ▌Patsy Keever (Democratic) 43.0% |
| North Carolina 11 | R+12 | Heath Shuler | Democratic | 2006 | Incumbent retired. Republican gain. | ▌ ✓ Mark Meadows (Republican) 57.4%; ▌Hayden Rogers (Democratic) 42.6% |
| North Carolina 12 | D+23 | Mel Watt | Democratic | 1992 | Incumbent re-elected. | ▌ ✓ Mel Watt (Democratic) 79.7%; ▌Jack Brosch (Republican) 20.3% |
| North Carolina 13 | R+9 | Brad Miller | Democratic | 2002 | Incumbent retired. Republican gain. | ▌ ✓ George Holding (Republican) 57.1%; ▌Charles Malone (Democratic) 42.9% |

== North Dakota ==
| District | PVI | Incumbent | Party | First elected | Result | Candidates |
|---|---|---|---|---|---|---|
| North Dakota at-large | R+10 | Rick Berg | Republican | 2010 | Incumbent retired to run for U.S. senator. Republican hold. | ▌ ✓ Kevin Cramer (Republican) 55.0%; ▌Pam Gulleson (Democratic-NPL) 41.8%; ▌Eric Olson (Libertarian) 3.2% |

== Ohio ==
Ohio's results

Ohio lost two seats in reapportionment. Three pairs of incumbents were redistricted together, and one new seat was created.

| District | PVI | Incumbent | Party | First elected | Result | Candidates |
|---|---|---|---|---|---|---|
| Ohio 1 | R+6 | Steve Chabot | Republican | 1994; 2008 (defeated); 2010 | Incumbent re-elected. | ▌ ✓ Steve Chabot (Republican) 58.3%; ▌Jeff Sinnard (Democratic) 37.1%; ▌Jim Berns (Libertarian) 2.7%; ▌Rich Stevenson (Green) 1.9% |
| Ohio 2 | R+9 | Jean Schmidt | Republican | 2005 (special) | Incumbent lost renomination Republican hold. | ▌ ✓ Brad Wenstrup (Republican) 59.1%; ▌William Smith (Democratic) 40.9% |
| Ohio 3 | D+14 | None (New seat) | | | New seat. Democratic gain. | ▌ ✓ Joyce Beatty (Democratic) 67.8%; ▌Chris Long (Republican) 26.9%; ▌Rich Ehrbar (Libertarian) 3.2%; ▌Bob Fitrakis (Green) 2.2% |
| Ohio 4 | R+9 | Jim Jordan | Republican | 2006 | Incumbent re-elected. | ▌ ✓ Jim Jordan (Republican) 58.7%; ▌Jim Slone (Democratic) 36.2%; ▌Chris Calla (Libertarian) 5.1% |
| Ohio 5 | R+8 | Bob Latta | Republican | 2007 (special) | Incumbent re-elected. | ▌ ✓ Bob Latta (Republican) 57.6%; ▌Angela Zimmann (Democratic) 38.9%; ▌Eric Eberly (Libertarian) 3.5% |
| Ohio 6 | R+5 | Bill Johnson | Republican | 2010 | Incumbent re-elected. | ▌ ✓ Bill Johnson (Republican) 53.3%; ▌Charlie Wilson (Democratic) 46.7% |
| Ohio 7 | R+5 | Bob Gibbs; Redistricted from the 18th district | Republican | 2010 | Incumbent re-elected. | ▌ ✓ Bob Gibbs (Republican) 56.7%; ▌Joyce Healy-Abrams (Democratic) 43.3% |
| Ohio 8 | R+14 | John Boehner | Republican | 1990 | Incumbent re-elected. | ▌ ✓ John Boehner (Republican); Uncontested |
| Ohio 9 | D+15 | Marcy Kaptur | Democratic | 1982 | Incumbent re-elected. | ▌ ✓ Marcy Kaptur (Democratic) 72.6%; ▌Samuel Wurzelbacher (Republican) 23.5%; ▌Sean Stipe (Libertarian) 3.9% |
| Ohio 9 | D+15 | Dennis Kucinich; Redistricted from the 10th district | Democratic | 1996 | Incumbent lost renomination. Democratic loss. | ▌ ✓ Marcy Kaptur (Democratic) 72.6%; ▌Samuel Wurzelbacher (Republican) 23.5%; ▌Sean Stipe (Libertarian) 3.9% |
| Ohio 10 | R+2 | Mike Turner; Redistricted from the 3rd district | Republican | 2002 | Incumbent re-elected. | ▌ ✓ Mike Turner (Republican) 60.2%; ▌Sharen Neuhardt (Democratic) 36.9%; ▌David Harlow (Libertarian) 2.9% |
| Ohio 10 | R+2 | Steve Austria; Redistricted from the 7th district | Republican | 2008 | Incumbent retired. Republican loss. | ▌ ✓ Mike Turner (Republican) 60.2%; ▌Sharen Neuhardt (Democratic) 36.9%; ▌David Harlow (Libertarian) 2.9% |
| Ohio 11 | D+30 | Marcia Fudge | Democratic | 2008 | Incumbent re-elected. | ▌ ✓ Marcia Fudge (Democratic); Uncontested |
| Ohio 12 | R+8 | Pat Tiberi | Republican | 2000 | Incumbent re-elected. | ▌ ✓ Pat Tiberi (Republican) 63.7%; ▌Jim Reese (Democratic) 36.3% |
| Ohio 13 | D+12 | Tim Ryan; Redistricted from the 17th district | Democratic | 2002 | Incumbent re-elected. | ▌ ✓ Tim Ryan (Democratic) 69.9%; ▌Marisha Agana (Republican) 30.1% |
| Ohio 14 | R+3 | Steve LaTourette | Republican | 1994 | Incumbent retired. Republican hold. | ▌ ✓ David Joyce (Republican) 54.3%; ▌Dale Blanchard (Democratic) 38.5%; ▌Elaine Mastromatteo (Green) 3.8%; ▌David Macko (Libertarian) 3.4% |
| Ohio 15 | R+6 | Steve Stivers | Republican | 2010 | Incumbent re-elected. | ▌ ✓ Steve Stivers (Republican) 61.8%; ▌Pat Lang (Democratic) 38.2% |
| Ohio 16 | R+5 | Jim Renacci | Republican | 2010 | Incumbent re-elected. | ▌ ✓ Jim Renacci (Republican) 52.2%; ▌Betty Sutton (Democratic) 47.8% |
| Ohio 16 | R+5 | Betty Sutton; Redistricted from the 13th district | Democratic | 2006 | Incumbent lost re-election. Democratic loss. | ▌ ✓ Jim Renacci (Republican) 52.2%; ▌Betty Sutton (Democratic) 47.8% |

== Oklahoma ==
| District | PVI | Incumbent | Party | First elected | Result | Candidates |
|---|---|---|---|---|---|---|
| Oklahoma 1 | R+16 | John Sullivan | Republican | 2002 | Incumbent lost renomination Republican hold. | ▌ ✓ Jim Bridenstine (Republican) 63.5%; ▌John Olson (Democratic) 32.0%; ▌Craig Allen (Independent) 4.5% |
| Oklahoma 2 | R+14 | Dan Boren | Democratic | 2004 | Incumbent retired. Republican gain. | ▌ ✓ Markwayne Mullin (Republican) 57.4%; ▌Rob Wallace (Democratic) 38.3%; ▌Michael Fulks (Independent) 4.3% |
| Oklahoma 3 | R+24 | Frank Lucas | Republican | 1994 | Incumbent re-elected. | ▌ ✓ Frank Lucas (Republican) 75.3%; ▌Tim Murray (Democratic) 20.0%; ▌William Sanders (Independent) 4.8% |
| Oklahoma 4 | R+18 | Tom Cole | Republican | 2002 | Incumbent re-elected. | ▌ ✓ Tom Cole (Republican) 67.9%; ▌Donna Bebo (Democratic) 27.6%; ▌R. J. Harris (Independent) 4.5% |
| Oklahoma 5 | R+13 | James Lankford | Republican | 2010 | Incumbent re-elected. | ▌ ✓ James Lankford (Republican) 58.7%; ▌Tom Guild (Democratic) 37.3%; ▌Pat Martin (Modern Whig) 2.1%; ▌Robert Murphy (Independent) 2.0% |

== Oregon ==
| District | PVI | Incumbent | Party | First elected | Result | Candidates |
|---|---|---|---|---|---|---|
| Oregon 1 | D+6 | Suzanne Bonamici | Democratic | 2012 (special) | Incumbent re-elected. | ▌ ✓ Suzanne Bonamici (Democratic) 59.6%; ▌Delinda Morgan (Republican) 33.3%; ▌Steven Reynolds (Libertarian) 4.4%; ▌Bob Ekstrom (Constitution) 2.7% |
| Oregon 2 | R+10 | Greg Walden | Republican | 1998 | Incumbent re-elected. | ▌ ✓ Greg Walden (Republican) 69.2%; ▌Joyce Segers (Democratic) 28.7%; ▌Harry Tabor (Libertarian) 2.0% |
| Oregon 3 | D+21 | Earl Blumenauer | Democratic | 1996 | Incumbent re-elected. | ▌ ✓ Earl Blumenauer (Democratic) 74.5%; ▌Ronald Green (Republican) 20.1%; ▌Woody Broadnax (Progressive) 3.6%; ▌Michael Cline (Libertarian) 1.8% |
| Oregon 4 | D+2 | Peter DeFazio | Democratic | 1986 | Incumbent re-elected. | ▌ ✓ Peter DeFazio (Democratic) 58.8%; ▌Art Robinson (Republican) 39.5%; ▌Chuck Huntting (Libertarian) 1.7% |
| Oregon 5 | EVEN | Kurt Schrader | Democratic | 2008 | Incumbent re-elected. | ▌ ✓ Kurt Schrader (Democratic) 54.0%; ▌Fred Thompson (Republican) 42.6%; ▌Chris Lugo (Pacific Green) 2.3%; ▌Raymond Baldwin (Constitution) 1.1% |

== Pennsylvania ==
Pennsylvania lost one seat in reapportionment, forcing two incumbent Democrats to run against each other, with the seat ultimately being won by a Republican challenger in November.

| District | PVI | Incumbent | Party | First elected | Result | Candidates |
|---|---|---|---|---|---|---|
| Pennsylvania 1 | D+25 | Bob Brady | Democratic | 1998 | Incumbent re-elected. | ▌ ✓ Bob Brady (Democratic) 85.1%; ▌John Featherman (Republican) 15.0% |
| Pennsylvania 2 | D+39 | Chaka Fattah | Democratic | 1994 | Incumbent re-elected. | ▌ ✓ Chaka Fattah (Democratic) 89.4%; ▌Robert Mansfield (Republican) 9.4%; ▌Jim Foster (Independent) 1.3% |
| Pennsylvania 3 | R+5 | Mike Kelly | Republican | 2010 | Incumbent re-elected. | ▌ ✓ Mike Kelly (Republican) 54.7%; ▌Missa Eaton (Democratic) 41.1%; ▌Steve Porter (Independent) 4.2% |
| Pennsylvania 4 | R+9 | Todd Platts; Redistricted from the 19th district | Republican | 2000 | Incumbent retired. Republican hold. | ▌ ✓ Scott Perry (Republican) 59.7%; ▌Harry Perkinson (Democratic) 34.4%; ▌Wayne Wolf (Independent) 3.8%; ▌Mike Koffenberger (Libertarian) 2.0% |
| Pennsylvania 5 | R+6 | Glenn Thompson | Republican | 2008 | Incumbent re-elected. | ▌ ✓ Glenn Thompson (Republican) 62.9%; ▌Charles Dumas (Democratic) 37.1% |
| Pennsylvania 6 | R+1 | Jim Gerlach | Republican | 2002 | Incumbent re-elected. | ▌ ✓ Jim Gerlach (Republican) 57.1%; ▌Manan Trivedi (Democratic) 42.9% |
| Pennsylvania 7 | EVEN | Pat Meehan | Republican | 2010 | Incumbent re-elected. | ▌ ✓ Pat Meehan (Republican) 59.5%; ▌George Badey (Democratic) 40.5% |
| Pennsylvania 8 | D+1 | Mike Fitzpatrick | Republican | 2004; 2006 (defeated); 2010 | Incumbent re-elected. | ▌ ✓ Mike Fitzpatrick (Republican) 56.7%; ▌Kathy Boockvar (Democratic) 43.4% |
| Pennsylvania 9 | R+10 | Bill Shuster | Republican | 2001 (special) | Incumbent re-elected. | ▌ ✓ Bill Shuster (Republican) 61.6%; ▌Karen Ramsburg (Democratic) 38.4% |
| Pennsylvania 10 | R+12 | Tom Marino | Republican | 2010 | Incumbent re-elected. | ▌ ✓ Tom Marino (Republican) 65.9%; ▌Phil Scollo (Democratic) 34.1% |
| Pennsylvania 11 | R+6 | Lou Barletta | Republican | 2010 | Incumbent re-elected. | ▌ ✓ Lou Barletta (Republican) 58.5%; ▌Gene Stilp (Democratic) 41.5% |
| Pennsylvania 12 | R+6 | Mark Critz | Democratic | 2010 (special) | Incumbent lost re-election. Republican gain. | ▌ ✓ Keith Rothfus (Republican) 51.5%; ▌Mark Critz (Democratic) 48.5% |
| Pennsylvania 12 | R+6 | Jason Altmire; Redistricted from the 4th district | Democratic | 2006 | Incumbent lost renomination. Democratic loss. | ▌ ✓ Keith Rothfus (Republican) 51.5%; ▌Mark Critz (Democratic) 48.5% |
| Pennsylvania 13 | D+12 | Allyson Schwartz | Democratic | 2004 | Incumbent re-elected. | ▌ ✓ Allyson Schwartz (Democratic) 69.0%; ▌Joe Rooney (Republican) 31.0% |
| Pennsylvania 14 | D+16 | Mike Doyle | Democratic | 1994 | Incumbent re-elected. | ▌ ✓ Mike Doyle (Democratic) 77.0%; ▌Hans Lessmann (Republican) 23.1% |
| Pennsylvania 15 | R+2 | Charlie Dent | Republican | 2004 | Incumbent re-elected. | ▌ ✓ Charlie Dent (Republican) 56.6%; ▌Rick Daugherty (Democratic) 43.4% |
| Pennsylvania 16 | R+6 | Joe Pitts | Republican | 1996 | Incumbent re-elected. | ▌ ✓ Joe Pitts (Republican) 55.0%; ▌Aryanna Strader (Democratic) 38.9%; ▌John Murphy (Independent) 4.3%; ▌Jim Bednarski (Independent) 1.8% |
| Pennsylvania 17 | D+4 | Tim Holden | Democratic | 1992 | Incumbent lost renomination. Democratic hold. | ▌ ✓ Matt Cartwright (Democratic) 60.5%; ▌Laureen Cummings (Republican) 39.5% |
| Pennsylvania 18 | R+6 | Tim Murphy | Republican | 2002 | Incumbent re-elected. | ▌ ✓ Tim Murphy (Republican) 63.8%; ▌Larry Maggi (Democratic) 36.2% |

== Rhode Island ==
The primary election was held September 11, 2012.

| District | PVI | Incumbent | Party | First elected | Result | Candidates |
|---|---|---|---|---|---|---|
| Rhode Island 1 | D+14 | David Cicilline | Democratic | 2010 | Incumbent re-elected. | ▌ ✓ David Cicilline (Democratic) 53.0%; ▌Brendan Doherty (Republican) 40.8%; ▌David Vogel (Independent) 6.1% |
| Rhode Island 2 | D+8 | Jim Langevin | Democratic | 2000 | Incumbent re-elected. | ▌ ✓ Jim Langevin (Democratic) 55.7%; ▌Michael Riley (Republican) 35.2%; ▌Abel Collins (Independent) 9.1% |

== South Carolina ==
South Carolina gained one seat in reapportionment.

| District | PVI | Incumbent | Party | First elected | Result | Candidates |
|---|---|---|---|---|---|---|
| South Carolina 1 | R+11 | Tim Scott | Republican | 2010 | Incumbent re-elected, but resigned when appointed U.S. Senator. | ▌ ✓ Tim Scott (Republican) 62.4%; ▌Bobbie Rose (Democratic) 35.4%; ▌Keith Blandford (Libertarian) 2.2% |
| South Carolina 2 | R+15 | Joe Wilson | Republican | 2001 (special) | Incumbent re-elected. | ▌ ✓ Joe Wilson (Republican) 96.3% |
| South Carolina 3 | R+16 | Jeff Duncan | Republican | 2010 | Incumbent re-elected. | ▌ ✓ Jeff Duncan (Republican) 66.7%; ▌Brian Doyle (Democratic) 33.3% |
| South Carolina 4 | R+15 | Trey Gowdy | Republican | 2010 | Incumbent re-elected. | ▌ ✓ Trey Gowdy (Republican) 65.0%; ▌Deb Morrow (Democratic) 33.8%; ▌Jeff Sumerel (Green) 1.3% |
| South Carolina 5 | R+9 | Mick Mulvaney | Republican | 2010 | Incumbent re-elected. | ▌ ✓ Mick Mulvaney (Republican) 55.6%; ▌Joyce Knott (Democratic) 44.4% |
| South Carolina 6 | D+18 | Jim Clyburn | Democratic | 1992 | Incumbent re-elected. | ▌ ✓ Jim Clyburn (Democratic) 94.4%; ▌Nammu Muhammad (Green) 5.6% |
| South Carolina 7 | R+7 | None (New seat) | | | New seat. Republican gain. | ▌ ✓ Tom Rice (Republican) 55.5%; ▌Gloria Bromell Tinubu (Democratic) 44.4% |

== South Dakota ==
| District | PVI | Incumbent | Party | First elected | Result | Candidates |
|---|---|---|---|---|---|---|
| South Dakota at-large | R+9 | Kristi Noem | Republican | 2010 | Incumbent re-elected. | ▌ ✓ Kristi Noem (Republican) 57.5%; ▌Matt Varilek (Democratic) 42.5% |

== Tennessee ==
| District | PVI | Incumbent | Party | First elected | Result | Candidates |
|---|---|---|---|---|---|---|
| Tennessee 1 | R+21 | Phil Roe | Republican | 2008 | Incumbent re-elected. | ▌ ✓ Phil Roe (Republican) 76.1%; ▌Alan Woodruff (Democratic) 19.9%; ▌Karen Brackett (Independent) 2.0%; ▌Bob Smith (Green) 1.2%; ▌Michael Salyer (Independent) 0.9% |
| Tennessee 2 | R+16 | Jimmy Duncan | Republican | 1988 (special) | Incumbent re-elected. | ▌ ✓ Jimmy Duncan (Republican) 74.4%; ▌Troy Goodale (Democratic) 20.6%; ▌Norris Dyer (Green) 2.2%; ▌Greg Samples (Libertarian) 1.7%; ▌Brandon Stewart (Independent) 1.1% |
| Tennessee 3 | R+12 | Chuck Fleischmann | Republican | 2010 | Incumbent re-elected. | ▌ ✓ Chuck Fleischmann (Republican) 61.4%; ▌Mary Headrick (Democratic) 35.5%; ▌Matthew Deniston (Independent) 3.1% |
| Tennessee 4 | R+13 | Scott DesJarlais | Republican | 2010 | Incumbent re-elected. | ▌ ✓ Scott DesJarlais (Republican) 55.8%; ▌Eric Stewart (Democratic) 44.2% |
| Tennessee 5 | D+5 | Jim Cooper | Democratic | 1982; 1994 (retired); 2002 | Incumbent re-elected. | ▌ ✓ Jim Cooper (Democratic) 65.2%; ▌Brad Staats (Republican) 32.8%; ▌John Miglietta (Green) 2.0% |
| Tennessee 6 | R+15 | Diane Black | Republican | 2010 | Incumbent re-elected. | ▌ ✓ Diane Black (Republican) 76.6%; ▌Scott Beasley (Independent) 14.4%; ▌Pat Riley (Green) 9.0% |
| Tennessee 7 | R+13 | Marsha Blackburn | Republican | 2002 | Incumbent re-elected. | ▌ ✓ Marsha Blackburn (Republican) 71.0%; ▌Credo Amouzouvik (Democratic) 24.0%; ▌Howard Switzer (Green) 1.8%; ▌Jack Arnold (Independent) 1.7%; ▌William Akin (Independent) 1.1%; ▌Lenny Ladner (Independent) 0.5% |
| Tennessee 8 | R+15 | Stephen Fincher | Republican | 2010 | Incumbent re-elected. | ▌ ✓ Stephen Fincher (Republican) 68.3%; ▌Tim Dixon (Democratic) 28.4%; ▌James L. Hart (Independent) 2.2%; ▌Mark Rawles (Independent) 1.0% |
| Tennessee 9 | D+22 | Steve Cohen | Democratic | 2006 | Incumbent re-elected. | ▌ ✓ Steve Cohen (Democratic) 75.1%; ▌George Flinn (Republican) 23.8%; Others: ▌Brian Saulsberry (Independent) 0.6%; ▌Gregory Joiner (Independent) 0.5% |

== Texas ==
Texas gained four seats in reapportionment. After the initial redistricting map drawn by the Texas Legislature was denied pre-clearance by a federal district court under Section 5 of the Voting Rights Act, Texas conducted its 2012 congressional elections under a court-ordered interim map.

| District | PVI | Incumbent | Party | First elected | Result | Candidates |
|---|---|---|---|---|---|---|
| Texas 1 | R+21 | Louie Gohmert | Republican | 2004 | Incumbent re-elected. | ▌ ✓ Louie Gohmert (Republican) 71.7%; ▌Shirley McKellar (Democratic) 26.6%; ▌Clark Patterson (Libertarian) 1.6% |
| Texas 2 | R+16 | Ted Poe | Republican | 2004 | Incumbent re-elected. | ▌ ✓ Ted Poe (Republican) 64.8%; ▌Jim Dougherty (Democratic) 32.7%; ▌Kenneth Duncan (Libertarian) 1.7%; ▌Mark Roberts (Green) 0.8% |
| Texas 3 | R+18 | Sam Johnson | Republican | 1991 (special) | Incumbent re-elected. | ▌ ✓ Sam Johnson (Republican) 100% |
| Texas 4 | R+21 | Ralph Hall | Republican | 1980 (Note: Hall was first elected as a Democrat. He became a Republican in January 2004.) | Incumbent re-elected. | ▌ ✓ Ralph Hall (Republican) 73.0%; ▌VaLinda Hathcox (Democratic) 24.1%; ▌Thomas Griffing (Libertarian) 2.9% |
| Texas 5 | R+15 | Jeb Hensarling | Republican | 2002 | Incumbent re-elected. | ▌ ✓ Jeb Hensarling (Republican) 64.4%; ▌Linda Mrosko (Democratic) 33.2%; ▌Ken Ashby (Libertarian) 2.4% |
| Texas 6 | R+15 | Joe Barton | Republican | 1984 | Incumbent re-elected. | ▌ ✓ Joe Barton (Republican) 58.0%; ▌Kenneth Sanders (Democratic) 39.2%; ▌Hugh Chauvin (Libertarian) 1.9%; ▌Brandon Parmer (Green) 0.8% |
| Texas 7 | R+14 | John Culberson | Republican | 2000 | Incumbent re-elected. | ▌ ✓ John Culberson (Republican) 60.8%; ▌James Cargas (Democratic) 36.4%; ▌Drew Parks (Libertarian) 2.0%; ▌Lance Findley (Green) 0.8% |
| Texas 8 | R+26 | Kevin Brady | Republican | 1996 | Incumbent re-elected. | ▌ ✓ Kevin Brady (Republican) 77.4%; ▌Neil Burns (Democratic) 20.3%; ▌Roy Hall (Libertarian) 2.4% |
| Texas 9 | D+21 | Al Green | Democratic | 2004 | Incumbent re-elected. | ▌ ✓ Al Green (Democratic) 78.5%; ▌Steve Mueller (Republican) 19.7%; ▌Vanessa Foster (Green) 0.9%; ▌John Wieder (Libertarian) 0.9% |
| Texas 10 | R+11 | Michael McCaul | Republican | 2004 | Incumbent re-elected. | ▌ ✓ Michael McCaul (Republican) 60.6%; ▌Tawana Walter-Cadien (Democratic) 36.2%; ▌Richard Priest (Libertarian) 3.2% |
| Texas 11 | R+29 | Mike Conaway | Republican | 2004 | Incumbent re-elected. | ▌ ✓ Mike Conaway (Republican) 78.6%; ▌Jim Riley (Democratic) 18.6%; ▌Scott Ballard (Libertarian) 2.8% |
| Texas 12 | R+17 | Kay Granger | Republican | 1996 | Incumbent re-elected. | ▌ ✓ Kay Granger (Republican) 70.9%; ▌Dave Robinson (Democratic) 26.7%; ▌Matt Solodow (Libertarian) 2.4% |
| Texas 13 | R+29 | Mac Thornberry | Republican | 1994 | Incumbent re-elected. | ▌ ✓ Mac Thornberry (Republican) 91.0%; ▌John Deek (Libertarian) 6.2%; ▌Keith Houston (Green) 2.9% |
| Texas 14 | R+8 | Ron Paul | Republican | 1976 (special); 1976 (defeated); 1978; 1984 (retired); 1996 | Incumbent retired to run for U.S. President; Republican hold. | ▌ ✓ Randy Weber (Republican) 53.5%; ▌Nick Lampson (Democratic) 44.6%; ▌Zach Grady (Libertarian) 1.5%; ▌Rhett Rosenquest Smith (Green) 0.4% |
| Texas 15 | D+1 | Rubén Hinojosa | Democratic | 1996 | Incumbent re-elected. | ▌ ✓ Rubén Hinojosa (Democratic) 60.9%; ▌Dale Brueggemann (Republican) 36.8%; ▌Ron Finch (Libertarian) 2.3% |
| Texas 16 | D+9 | Silvestre Reyes | Democratic | 1996 | Incumbent lost renomination. Democratic hold. | ▌ ✓ Beto O'Rourke (Democratic) 65.5%; ▌Barbara Carrasco (Republican) 32.8%; ▌Junart Sodoy (Libertarian) 1.6% |
| Texas 17 | R+12 | Bill Flores | Republican | 2010 | Incumbent re-elected. | ▌ ✓ Bill Flores (Republican) 79.9%; ▌Ben Easton (Libertarian) 20.1% |
| Texas 18 | D+22 | Sheila Jackson Lee | Democratic | 1994 | Incumbent re-elected. | ▌ ✓ Sheila Jackson Lee (Democratic) 75.0%; ▌Sean Seibert (Republican) 22.6%; ▌Christopher Barber (Libertarian) 2.4% |
| Texas 19 | R+26 | Randy Neugebauer | Republican | 2003 (special) | Incumbent re-elected. | ▌ ✓ Randy Neugebauer (Republican) 85.0%; ▌Chip Peterson (Libertarian) 15.0% |
| Texas 20 | D+3 | Charlie González | Democratic | 1998 | Incumbent retired. Democratic hold. | ▌ ✓ Joaquin Castro (Democratic) 64.0%; ▌David Rosa (Republican) 33.4%; ▌Tracy Potts (Libertarian) 1.7%; ▌Antonio Diaz (Green) 0.9% |
| Texas 21 | R+11 | Lamar Smith | Republican | 1986 | Incumbent re-elected. | ▌ ✓ Lamar Smith (Republican) 60.6%; ▌Candace Duval (Democratic) 35.4%; ▌John-Henry Liberty (Libertarian) 4.1% |
| Texas 22 | R+15 | Pete Olson | Republican | 2008 | Incumbent re-elected. | ▌ ✓ Pete Olson (Republican) 64.1%; ▌Kesha Rogers (Democratic) 31.9%; ▌Steven Susman (Libertarian) 2.4%; ▌Don Cook (Green) 1.6% |
| Texas 23 | R+5 | Quico Canseco | Republican | 2010 | Incumbent lost re-election. Democratic gain. | ▌ ✓ Pete Gallego (Democratic) 50.3%; ▌Quico Canseco (Republican) 45.5%; ▌Jeffrey Blunt (Libertarian) 3.0%; ▌Ed Scharf (Green) 1.1% |
| Texas 24 | R+14 | Kenny Marchant | Republican | 2004 | Incumbent re-elected. | ▌ ✓ Kenny Marchant (Republican) 61.0%; ▌Tim Rusk (Democratic) 36.0%; ▌John Stathas (Libertarian) 3.0% |
| Texas 25 | R+10 | None (New seat) | | | New seat. Republican gain. | ▌ ✓ Roger Williams (Republican) 58.5%; ▌Elaine Henderson (Democratic) 37.4%; ▌Betsy Dewey (Libertarian) 4.1% |
| Texas 26 | R+20 | Michael C. Burgess | Republican | 2002 | Incumbent re-elected. | ▌ ✓ Michael C. Burgess (Republican) 68.3%; ▌David Sanchez (Democratic) 28.6%; ▌Mark Boler (Libertarian) 3.0% |
| Texas 27 | R+13 | Blake Farenthold | Republican | 2010 | Incumbent re-elected. | ▌ ✓ Blake Farenthold (Republican) 56.7%; ▌Rose Meza Harrison (Democratic) 39.2%; ▌William Baldwin (Independent) 2.5%; ▌Corrie Byrd (Libertarian) 1.5% |
| Texas 28 | D+2 | Henry Cuellar | Democratic | 2004 | Incumbent re-elected. | ▌ ✓ Henry Cuellar (Democratic) 67.9%; ▌William Hayward (Republican) 29.7%; ▌Patrick Hisel (Libertarian) 1.5%; ▌Michael Cary (Green) 0.8% |
| Texas 29 | D+8 | Gene Green | Democratic | 1992 | Incumbent re-elected. | ▌ ✓ Gene Green (Democratic) 90.0%; ▌James Stanczak (Libertarian) 5.2%; ▌Maria Selva (Green) 4.8% |
| Texas 30 | D+23 | Eddie Bernice Johnson | Democratic | 1992 | Incumbent re-elected. | ▌ ✓ Eddie Bernice Johnson (Democratic) 78.9%; ▌Travis Washington (Republican) 19.0%; ▌Ed Rankin (Libertarian) 2.2% |
| Texas 31 | R+13 | John Carter | Republican | 2002 | Incumbent re-elected. | ▌ ✓ John Carter (Republican) 61.3%; ▌Stephen Wyman (Democratic) 35.0%; ▌Ethan Garofolo (Libertarian) 3.7% |
| Texas 32 | R+10 | Pete Sessions | Republican | 1996 | Incumbent re-elected. | ▌ ✓ Pete Sessions (Republican) 58.3%; ▌Katherine McGovern (Democratic) 39.4%; ▌Seth Hollist (Libertarian) 2.3% |
| Texas 33 | D+14 | None (New seat) | | | New seat. Democratic gain. | ▌ ✓ Marc Veasey (Democratic) 72.5%; ▌Chuck Bradley (Republican) 25.7%; ▌Ed Lindsay (Green) 1.7% |
| Texas 34 | D+3 | None (New seat) | | | New seat. Democratic gain. | ▌ ✓ Filemon Vela Jr. (Democratic) 62.2%; ▌Jessica Puente Bradshaw (Republican) 35.9%; ▌Ziggy Shanklin (Libertarian) 1.9% |
| Texas 35 | D+9 | Lloyd Doggett; Redistricted from the 25th district | Democratic | 1994 | Incumbent re-elected. | ▌ ✓ Lloyd Doggett (Democratic) 64.0%; ▌Susan Narvaiz (Republican) 32.0%; ▌Ross Leone (Libertarian) 2.5%; ▌Meghan Owen (Green) 1.5% |
| Texas 36 | R+20 | None (New seat) | | | New seat. Republican gain. | ▌ ✓ Steve Stockman (Republican) 70.8%; ▌Max Martin (Democratic) 26.6%; ▌Michael Cole (Libertarian) 2.7% |

== Utah ==
Utah gained one seat in reapportionment.

| District | PVI | Incumbent | Party | First elected | Result | Candidates |
|---|---|---|---|---|---|---|
| Utah 1 | R+25 | Rob Bishop | Republican | 2002 | Incumbent re-elected. | ▌ ✓ Rob Bishop (Republican) 71.5%; ▌Donna McAleer (Democratic) 24.7%; ▌Sherry Phipps (Constitution) 3.8% |
| Utah 2 | R+16 | None (New seat) | | | New seat. Republican gain. | ▌ ✓ Chris Stewart (Republican) 62.3%; ▌Jay Seegmiller (Democratic) 33.6%; ▌Jonathan Garrard (Constitution) 1.9%; ▌Joe Andrade (Independent) 1.2%; ▌Charles Kimball (Independent) 1.1% |
| Utah 3 | R+25 | Jason Chaffetz | Republican | 2008 | Incumbent re-elected. | ▌ ✓ Jason Chaffetz (Republican) 76.4%; ▌Søren Simonsen (Democratic) 23.6% |
| Utah 4 | R+14 | Jim Matheson; Redistricted from the 2nd district | Democratic | 2000 | Incumbent re-elected. | ▌ ✓ Jim Matheson (Democratic) 49.3%; ▌Mia Love (Republican) 48.1%; ▌Jim Vein (Libertarian) 2.6% |

== Vermont ==
| District | PVI | Incumbent | Party | First elected | Result | Candidates |
|---|---|---|---|---|---|---|
| Vermont at-large | D+13 | Peter Welch | Democratic | 2006 | Incumbent re-elected. | ▌ ✓ Peter Welch (Democratic) 72.0%; ▌Mark Donka (Republican) 23.2%; ▌Sam Desrochers (Independent) 2.9%; ▌Jane Newton (Liberty Union) 1.5%; ▌Andre LaFramboise (Independent) 0.4% |

== Virginia ==
| District | PVI | Incumbent | Party | First elected | Result | Candidates |
|---|---|---|---|---|---|---|
| Virginia 1 | R+8 | Rob Wittman | Republican | 2007 (special) | Incumbent re-elected. | ▌ ✓ Rob Wittman (Republican) 56.1%; ▌Adam Cook (Democratic) 41.0%; ▌Gail Parker (Independent Green) 2.9% |
| Virginia 2 | R+5 | Scott Rigell | Republican | 2010 | Incumbent re-elected. | ▌ ✓ Scott Rigell (Republican) 53.8%; ▌Paul Hirschbiel (Democratic) 46.2% |
| Virginia 3 | D+23 | Bobby Scott | Democratic | 1992 | Incumbent re-elected. | ▌ ✓ Bobby Scott (Democratic) 81.2%; ▌Dean Longo (Republican) 18.8% |
| Virginia 4 | R+6 | Randy Forbes | Republican | 2001 (special) | Incumbent re-elected. | ▌ ✓ Randy Forbes (Republican) 57.1%; ▌Ella Ward (Democratic) 42.9% |
| Virginia 5 | R+6 | Robert Hurt | Republican | 2010 | Incumbent re-elected. | ▌ ✓ Robert Hurt (Republican) 55.3%; ▌John W. Douglass (Democratic) 42.2%; ▌Ken Hildebrandt (Independent Green) 1.6% |
| Virginia 6 | R+12 | Bob Goodlatte | Republican | 1992 | Incumbent re-elected. | ▌ ✓ Bob Goodlatte (Republican) 65.6%; ▌Andy Schmookler (Democratic) 34.4% |
| Virginia 7 | R+11 | Eric Cantor | Republican | 2000 | Incumbent re-elected. | ▌ ✓ Eric Cantor (Republican) 58.6%; ▌E. Wayne Powell (Democratic) 41.4% |
| Virginia 8 | D+15 | Jim Moran | Democratic | 1990 | Incumbent re-elected. | ▌ ✓ Jim Moran (Democratic) 64.6%; ▌Jay Patrick Murray (Republican) 30.7%; ▌Jason Howell (Independent) 3.0%; ▌Janet Murphy (Independent) 1.7% |
| Virginia 9 | R+11 | Morgan Griffith | Republican | 2010 | Incumbent re-elected. | ▌ ✓ Morgan Griffith (Republican) 61.2%; ▌Anthony Flaccavento (Democratic) 38.8% |
| Virginia 10 | R+4 | Frank Wolf | Republican | 1980 | Incumbent re-elected. | ▌ ✓ Frank Wolf (Republican) 58.8%; ▌Kristin Cabral (Democratic) 38.4%; ▌Kevin Chisholm (Independent) 2.8% |
| Virginia 11 | D+7 | Gerry Connolly | Democratic | 2008 | Incumbent re-elected. | ▌ ✓ Gerry Connolly (Democratic) 61.0%; ▌Chris Perkins (Republican) 35.5%; ▌Mark Gibson (Independent) 1.2%; ▌Chris DeCarlo (Independent) 1.0%; ▌Joe Galdo (Green) 0.7%; ▌Peter Marchetti (Independent Green) 0.6% |

== Washington ==
Washington gained one seat in reapportionment. Primary elections were held August 7, 2012.

| District | PVI | Incumbent | Party | First elected | Result | Candidates |
|---|---|---|---|---|---|---|
| Washington 1 | D+3 | Vacant | | | Jay Inslee (D) resigned March 20, 2012 to run for Governor of Washington. Democratic hold. Winner was also elected the same day to finish the current term, see above. | ▌ ✓ Suzan DelBene (Democratic) 53.6%; ▌John Koster (Republican) 46.4% |
| Washington 2 | D+8 | Rick Larsen | Democratic | 2000 | Incumbent re-elected. | ▌ ✓ Rick Larsen (Democratic) 60.9%; ▌Dan Matthews (Republican) 39.1% |
| Washington 3 | R+2 | Jaime Herrera Beutler | Republican | 2010 | Incumbent re-elected. | ▌ ✓ Jaime Herrera Beutler (Republican) 60.1%; ▌Jon T. Haugen (Democratic) 39.9% |
| Washington 4 | R+14 | Doc Hastings | Republican | 1994 | Incumbent re-elected. | ▌ ✓ Doc Hastings (Republican) 67.0%; ▌Mary Baechler (Democratic) 33.0% |
| Washington 5 | R+6 | Cathy McMorris Rodgers | Republican | 2004 | Incumbent re-elected. | ▌ ✓ Cathy McMorris Rodgers (Republican) 62.1%; ▌Rich Cowan (Democratic) 37.9% |
| Washington 6 | D+5 | Norm Dicks | Democratic | 1976 | Incumbent retired. Democratic hold. | ▌ ✓ Derek Kilmer (Democratic) 58.8%; ▌Bill Driscoll (Republican) 41.2% |
| Washington 7 | D+28 | Jim McDermott | Democratic | 1988 | Incumbent re-elected. | ▌ ✓ Jim McDermott (Democratic) 79.5%; ▌Ron Bemis (Republican) 20.5% |
| Washington 8 | R+2 | Dave Reichert | Republican | 2004 | Incumbent re-elected. | ▌ ✓ Dave Reichert (Republican) 59.9%; ▌Karen Porterfeild (Democratic) 40.1% |
| Washington 9 | D+15 | Adam Smith | Democratic | 1996 | Incumbent re-elected. | ▌ ✓ Adam Smith (Democratic) 71.5%; ▌James Postma (Republican) 28.5% |
| Washington 10 | D+4 | None (New seat) | | | New seat. Democratic gain. | ▌ ✓ Denny Heck (Democratic) 58.6%; ▌Dick Muri (Republican) 41.4% |

== West Virginia ==
| District | PVI | Incumbent | Party | First elected | Result | Candidates |
|---|---|---|---|---|---|---|
| West Virginia 1 | R+9 | David McKinley | Republican | 2010 | Incumbent re-elected. | ▌ ✓ David McKinley (Republican) 62.5%; ▌Sue Thorn (Democratic) 37.5% |
| West Virginia 2 | R+8 | Shelley Moore Capito | Republican | 2000 | Incumbent re-elected. | ▌ ✓ Shelley Moore Capito (Republican) 69.8%; ▌Howard Swint (Democratic) 30.2% |
| West Virginia 3 | R+6 | Nick Rahall | Democratic | 1976 | Incumbent re-elected. | ▌ ✓ Nick Rahall (Democratic) 53.9%; ▌Rick Snuffer (Republican) 46.1% |

== Wisconsin ==
| District | PVI | Incumbent | Party | First elected | Result | Candidates |
|---|---|---|---|---|---|---|
| Wisconsin 1 | R+3 | Paul Ryan | Republican | 1998 | Incumbent re-elected. | ▌ ✓ Paul Ryan (Republican) 54.9%; ▌Rob Zerban (Democratic) 43.4%; ▌Keith Deschler (Libertarian) 1.7% |
| Wisconsin 2 | D+16 | Tammy Baldwin | Democratic | 1998 | Incumbent retired to run for U.S. senator. Democratic hold. | ▌ ✓ Mark Pocan (Democratic) 68.0%; ▌Chad Lee (Republican) 32.0%; ▌Joe Kopsick (Independent) |
| Wisconsin 3 | D+6 | Ron Kind | Democratic | 1996 | Incumbent re-elected. | ▌ ✓ Ron Kind (Democratic) 64.1%; ▌Ray Boland (Republican) 35.9% |
| Wisconsin 4 | D+21 | Gwen Moore | Democratic | 2004 | Incumbent re-elected. | ▌ ✓ Gwen Moore (Democratic) 72.3%; ▌Dan Sebring (Republican) 23.8%; ▌Robert R. Raymond (Independent) 2.8% |
| Wisconsin 5 | R+12 | Jim Sensenbrenner | Republican | 1978 | Incumbent re-elected. | ▌ ✓ Jim Sensenbrenner (Republican) 67.9%; ▌Dave Heaster (Democratic) 32.1% |
| Wisconsin 6 | R+5 | Tom Petri | Republican | 1979 (special) | Incumbent re-elected. | ▌ ✓ Tom Petri (Republican) 62.1%; ▌Joe Kallas (Democratic) 37.9% |
| Wisconsin 7 | EVEN | Sean Duffy | Republican | 2010 | Incumbent re-elected. | ▌ ✓ Sean Duffy (Republican) 56.1%; ▌Pat Kreitlow (Democratic) 43.9%; ▌Dale Lehner (Independent) |
| Wisconsin 8 | R+2 | Reid Ribble | Republican | 2010 | Incumbent re-elected. | ▌ ✓ Reid Ribble (Republican) 55.9%; ▌Jamie Wall (Democratic) 44.1% |

== Wyoming ==
| District | PVI | Incumbent | Party | First elected | Result | Candidates |
|---|---|---|---|---|---|---|
| Wyoming at-large | R+20 | Cynthia Lummis | Republican | 2008 | Incumbent re-elected. | ▌ ✓ Cynthia Lummis (Republican) 69.1%; ▌Chris Henrichsen (Democratic) 23.8%; ▌Richard Brubaker (Libertarian) 3.5%; ▌Daniel Cummings (Constitution) 2.1%; ▌Don Wills (Wyoming Country) 1.6% |

== Non-voting delegates ==
Puerto Rico's Resident Commissioner is elected to a four-year term during U.S. presidential election years. It is the only seat in the House elected for a four-year term.

| District | Incumbent | | | This race | |
| District | Delegate | Party | First elected | Results | Candidates |
|---|---|---|---|---|---|
| American Samoa at-large | Eni Faleomavaega | Democratic | 1988 | Incumbent re-elected. | ▌ ✓ Eni Faleomavaega (Democratic) 55.2%; ▌Amata Coleman Radewagen (Conservative) 33.8%; ▌Rosie Fuala'au Tago Lancaster (Independent) 5.3% |
| District of Columbia at-large | Eleanor Holmes Norton | Democratic | 1990 | Incumbent re-elected. | ▌ ✓ Eleanor Holmes Norton (Democratic) 89.4%; ▌Bruce Majors (Libertarian) 5.8%; ▌Natale Stracuzzi (DC Statehood Green) 4.8% |
| Guam at-large | Madeleine Bordallo | Democratic | 2002 | Incumbent re-elected. | ▌ ✓ Madeleine Bordallo (Democratic) 58.4%; ▌Frank F. Blas Jr. (Republican) 38.4% |
| Northern Mariana Islands at-large | Gregorio Sablan | Independent | 2008 | Incumbent re-elected. | ▌ ✓ Gregorio Sablan (Independent) 79.7%; ▌Ignacia T. Demapan (Republican) 20.3% |
| Puerto Rico at-large | Pedro Pierluisi | New Progressive/ Democratic | 2008 | Incumbent re-elected. | ▌ ✓ Pedro Pierluisi (PNP/Democratic) 48.4%; ▌Rafael Cox Alomar (PPD/Democratic) 47.2%; ▌Juan Manuel Mercado Nieves (PIP) 2.1% |
| U.S. Virgin Islands at-large | Donna Christian-Christensen | Democratic | 1996 | Incumbent re-elected. | ▌ ✓ Donna Christian-Christensen (Democratic) 60.1%; ▌Warren Mosler (Independent) 17.1%; ▌Holland Redfield II (Republican) 11.1%; ▌Norma Pickard-Samuel (Independent) 10.1% |

== See also ==
- 2012 United States elections
  - 2012 United States gubernatorial elections
  - 2012 United States presidential election
  - 2012 United States Senate elections
- 112th United States Congress
- 113th United States Congress
