= 2012 Michigan's 11th congressional district election =

- November 6, 2012
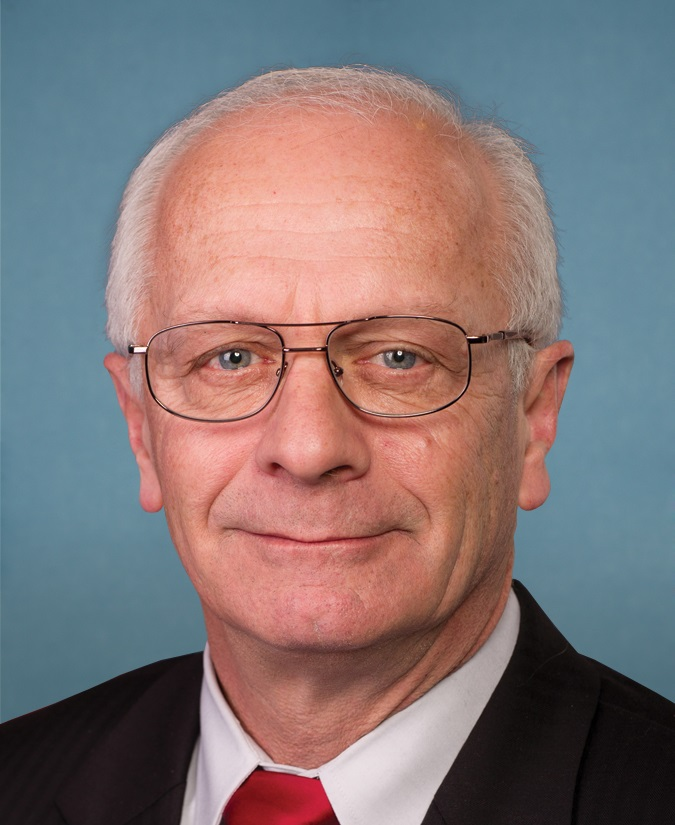

Nominee	Kerry Bentivolio	Syed Taj
Party	Republican	Democratic
Popular vote	181,788	158,879
Percentage	50.8%	44.4%
U.S. Representative before election
David Curson
Democratic
Elected U.S. Representative
Kerry Bentivolio
Republican

Michigan's 11th congressional district election was held on November 6, 2012, for a seat in the 113th United States Congress alongside a presidential election, other elections to the United States House of Representatives and elections for class I of the United States Senate. In Michigan, all of the state's 14 congressional seats were at stake. Michigan's junior United States Senator Debbie Stabenow is running for re-election. Additionally, all 110 seats in the Michigan House of Representatives were at stake.

In reapportionment done following the 2010 United States census, the district was redrawn to favor the then Congressman Thaddeus McCotter.

The election was held alongside a special election to fill a vacancy in Michigan's 11th congressional district caused by the July 6, 2012 resignation of Republican member of the United States House of Representatives Thaddeus McCotter. The primary for the special election was held on September 5, 2012.

== Background ==
After a failed, short-lived presidential campaign, McCotter opted to run for 6th term in the House. On May 25, 2012, it was announced that McCotter had fallen short of the required 1,000 signatures to appear on the ballot for the August 7 GOP primary.

On May 29, 2012, McCotter announced his intentions to seek the GOP nomination as write-in candidate. McCotter ended his write-in campaign shortly after on June 2, 2012.

McCotter resigned from Congress on July 6, 2012. On 11 August 2012, Michigan Attorney General Bill Schuette announced charges against four former McCotter staff aides, for their roles in obtaining and submitting fraudulent election petitions.

== Primary election ==
=== Republican ===
After McCotter's resignation, the only other Republican who qualified for the primary ballot was political novice/Tea Party activist Kerry Bentivolio.

After McCotter's resignation, several candidates considered mounting a write-in campaign, including Birmingham-based foreclosure attorney David Trott, former state Rep. Andrew "Rocky" Raczkowski, state Sen. Mike Kowall of White Lake and former Oakland County Republican Party Chairman Paul Welday. Eventually, State GOP leaders rallied around former state Sen. Nancy Cassis.

==== Candidates ====
- Kerry Bentivolio
- Nancy Cassis (write-in)

Declined/Withdrew

- David Trott
- Andy Raczkowski
- Mike Kowall
- Paul Welday

Disqualified from Ballot

- Thad McCotter

==== Results ====
2012 Republican Primary - Michigan's 11th Congressional District
Party	Candidate	Votes	%	±%
Republican	Kerry Bentivolio	42,468	65.5	N/A
Republican	Total Write-In	22,490	34.5	N/A

=== Democratic ===
Only two candidates, both with low name recognition qualified for the Democratic primary ballot before McCotter's resignation. They were Dr. Syed Taj, a member of the Canton Township Board of Trustees and Bill Roberts, a Lyndon LaRouche activist whose main goal was to impeach President Barack Obama and campaigned with posters with Obama having a mustache similar to Adolf Hitler.

==== Results ====
2012 Democratic Primary - Michigan's 11th Congressional District
Party	Candidate	Votes	%	±%
Democratic	Syed Taj	21,952	58.9	N/A
Democratic	Bill Roberts	15,338	41.1	N/A

== General election ==
=== Candidates ===
- Kerry Bentivolio, Republican nominee
- Syed Taj, Democratic nominee
- Steven Paul Duke, Green Party nominee
- John J. Tartar, Libertarian Party nominee
- William Daniel Johnson, Natural Law Party nominee

=== Predictions ===
Source	Ranking	As of
The Cook Political Report	Lean R	November 5, 2012
Rothenberg	Lean R	November 2, 2012
Roll Call	Likely R	November 4, 2012
Sabato's Crystal Ball	Lean R	November 5, 2012
NY Times	Lean R	November 4, 2012
RCP	Tossup	November 4, 2012
The Hill	Likely R	November 4, 2012

=== Results ===
2012 General Election - Michigan's 11th Congressional District
Party	Candidate	Votes	%	±%
Republican	Kerry Bentivolio	181,788	50.8	N/A
Democratic	Syed Taj	158,879	44.4	N/A
Libertarian	John Tatar	9,637	2.7	N/A
Green	Steven Duke	4,569	1.3	N/A
Natural Law	Daniel Johnson	3,251	0.9	N/A

==== By county ====
County	Kerry Bentivolio Republican		Syed Taj Democratic		Various candidates Other parties		Margin		Total
County	#	%	#	%	#	%	#	%	Total
Oakland (part)	117,740	52.5%	95,330	42.5%	11,213	5.1%	22,410	10.0%	224,283
Wayne (part)	64,048	47.8%	63,549	47.5%	6,259	4.6%	499	2.3%	133,856
Totals	181,788	50.8%	158,879	44.4%	17,742	4.9%	22,909	6.4%	358,139
