= 2012 United States House of Representatives elections in Michigan =

- November 6, 2012

All 14 Michigan seats to the United States House of Representatives
	Majority party	Minority party
Party	Republican	Democratic
Last election	9	6
Seats won	9	5
Seat change	Steady	▼1
Popular vote	2,086,804	2,327,985
Percentage	45.62%	50.89%
Swing	▼6.70%	▲6.59%

Republican
40–50%
50–60%
60–70%
70–80%
Democratic
40–50%
50–60%
60–70%
70–80%
80–90%

The 2012 United States House of Representatives elections in Michigan was held on Tuesday, November 6, 2012, to elect the 14 U.S. representatives from the state of Michigan, a decrease of one following the 2010 United States census. The elections coincided with the elections of other federal and state offices, including a quadrennial presidential election and an election to the U.S. Senate. Primary elections were held on August 7, 2012. The filing deadline for candidates to file to run in the primary was May 15. Except for two seats, all the incumbents sought re-election. The open seats were the 5th and 11th congressional districts. Due to the loss of one seat from the 2010 census, two congressmen ran against each other.

Despite Democrats winning more than 240,000 more votes for U.S. House districts statewide, Republicans won nine of 14 seats, and Michiganders tied a state record by electing the lowest rate (35 percent) of U.S. representatives by a major party while simultaneously casting its electoral votes for that party's presidential nominee. This made Michigan one of five states in which the party that won the state's popular vote did not win a majority of seats in 2012, the other states being Arizona, North Carolina, Pennsylvania, and Wisconsin.

== Overview ==
United States House of Representatives elections in Michigan, 2012
Party	Votes	Percentage	Seats before	Seats after	+/–
Democratic	2,327,985	50.89%	6	5	-1
Republican	2,086,804	45.62%	9	9	-
Libertarian	102,141	2.23%	0	0	-
Green	25,379	0.55%	0	0	-
U.S. Taxpayers	16,264	0.36%	0	0	-
Independents	16,059	0.35%	0	0	-
Total	4,574,632	100.00%	15	14	-1

Popular vote
Democratic	50.89%
Republican	45.62%
Libertarian Party	2.23%
Other	1.26%

House seats
Republican	64.28%
Democratic	35.71%

== Redistricting ==
The Michigan Legislature, which is controlled by the Republican Party, began the redistricting process on April 11, 2011. A plan released by the Republican Party in June 2011, which would place the homes of Democrats Gary Peters and Sander Levin into the same district, was passed by the Michigan House of Representatives and Senate later that month. The plan was signed into law by Governor Rick Snyder on August 9. The two incumbents forced to face each other were Gary Peters and Hansen Clarke.

== District 1 ==
2012 Michigan's 1st congressional district election
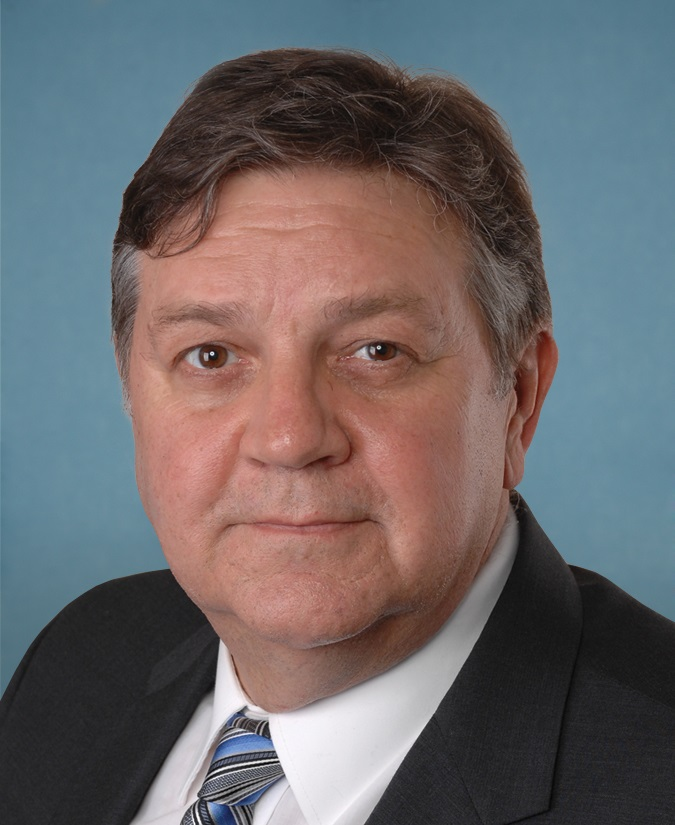

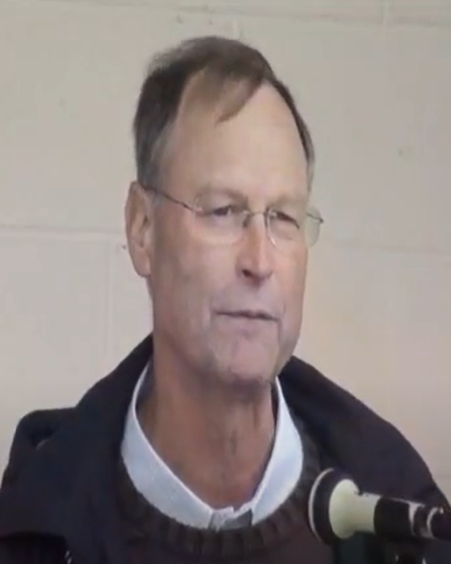
Nominee	Dan Benishek	Gary McDowell
Party	Republican	Democratic
Popular vote	167,060	165,179
Percentage	48.1%	47.6%
- Benishek: 40–50% 50–60% McDowell: 40–50% 50–60%
U.S. Representative before election
Dan Benishek
Republican
Elected U.S. Representative
Dan Benishek
Republican

In redistricting, the 1st district was made slightly more favorable to Republicans: Republican nominee John McCain received less than one percentage point more of the vote in the 2008 presidential election in the newly drawn district compared to the former district. Roll Call had rated the race as "Leans Republican," but changed the rating first to "Tossup" and then "Leans Democratic." Republican Dan Benishek, who was first elected to represent the 1st district in 2010, ran for re-election.

The third-party candidates were Emily Salvette as the Libertarian Party nominee and Ellis Boal as the Green Party nominee.

=== Republican primary ===
==== Candidates ====
===== Nominee =====
- Dan Benishek, incumbent U.S. representative

==== Primary results ====
Republican primary results
Party	Candidate	Votes	%
Republican	Dan Benishek (incumbent)	64,411	100.0
Total votes		64,411	100.0

=== Democratic primary ===
==== Candidates ====
===== Nominee =====
- Gary McDowell, former state representative and nominee for this seat in 2010

===== Withdrawn =====
- Derek Bailey, tribal chairman of the Grand Traverse Band of Ottawa and Chippewa Indians (running for the 101st State House district)

==== Primary results ====
Democratic primary results
Party	Candidate	Votes	%
Democratic	Gary McDowell	36,339	100.0
Total votes		36,339	100.0

=== General election ===
==== Endorsements ====
Dan Benishek (R)

Organizations

- National Republican Congressional Committee "Patriot" Program
- National Right to Life Committee
- NRA Political Victory Fund
- United States Chamber of Commerce

Newspapers

- The Detroit News
Gary McDowell (D)

Labor unions

- AFL-CIO
- National Association of Letter Carriers

Organizations

- Blue Dog Coalition
- Democratic Congressional Campaign Committee "Red to Blue" Program
- League of Conservation Voters

Newspapers

- Detroit Free Press

==== Debate ====
2012 Michigan's 1st congressional district debate
No.	Date	Host	Moderator	Link	Republican	Democratic
Key: P Participant A Absent N Not invited I Invited W Withdrawn						
Key: P Participant A Absent N Not invited I Invited W Withdrawn					Dan Benishek	Gary McDowell
1	Oct. 16, 2012	League of Women Voters of the Grand Traverse Area	Jennifer Berry	C-SPAN	P	P

==== Polling ====
Poll source	Date(s) administered	Sample size	Margin of error	Dan Benishek (R)	Gary McDowell (D)	Undecided
Benenson Strategy Group	September 29 – October 1, 2012	400	± 4.9%	40%	43%	17%
Garin-Hart-Yang	September 18–20, 2012	402	± 4.9%	40%	49%	11%
Public Policy Polling	September 18–19, 2012	866	± 3.3%	42%	44%	14%
Garin-Hart-Yang	June 19–20, 2012	402	± 4.9%	40%	38%	22%
Public Policy Polling	January 18–23, 2012	867	± 3.3%	41%	46%	13%

==== Predictions ====
Source	Ranking	As of
The Cook Political Report	Tossup	November 5, 2012
Rothenberg	Tossup	November 2, 2012
Roll Call	Tossup	November 4, 2012
Sabato's Crystal Ball	Lean D (flip)	November 5, 2012
NY Times	Tossup	November 4, 2012
RCP	Tossup	November 4, 2012
The Hill	Tossup	November 4, 2012

==== Results ====
Michigan's 1st congressional district, 2012
Party	Candidate	Votes	%
Republican	Dan Benishek (incumbent)	167,060	48.1
Democratic	Gary McDowell	165,179	47.6
Libertarian	Emily Salvette	10,630	3.1
Green	Ellis Boal	4,168	1.2
Total votes		347,037	100.0
Republican hold			

== District 2 ==
2012 Michigan's 2nd congressional district election
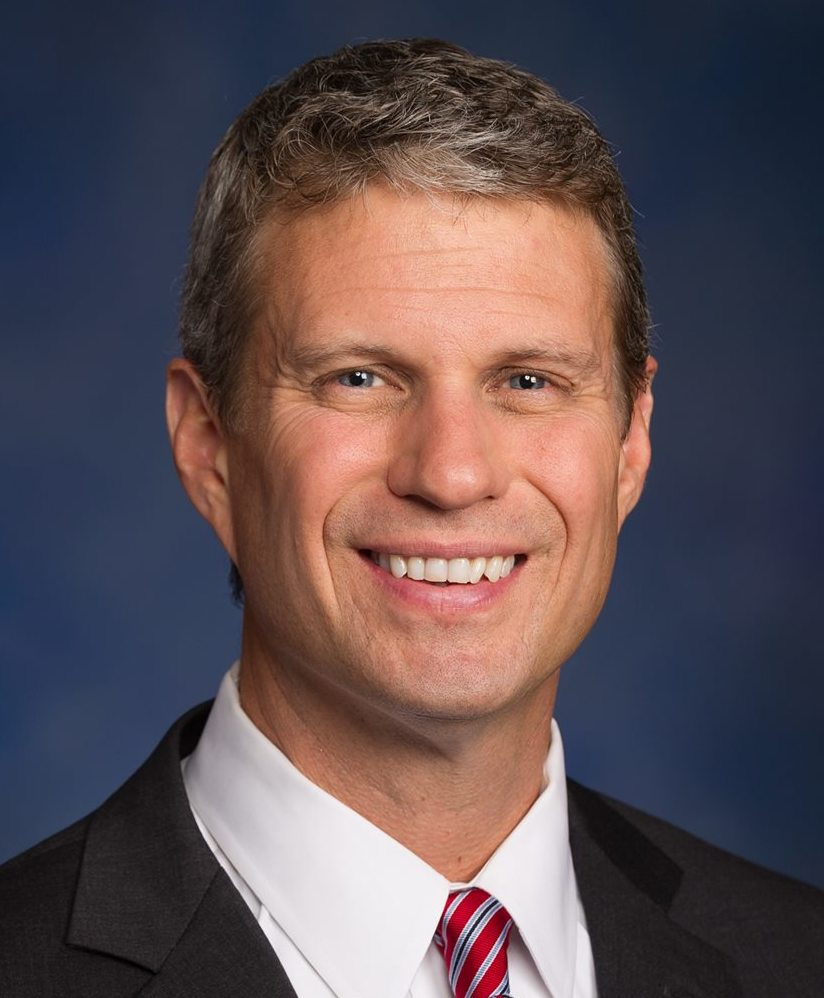

Nominee	Bill Huizenga	Willie German, Jr.
Party	Republican	Democratic
Popular vote	194,653	108,973
Percentage	61.2%	34.2%
- County results Huizenga: 40–50% 50–60% 60–70% 70–80% German: 40–50%
U.S. Representative before election
Bill Huizenga
Republican
Elected U.S. Representative
Bill Huizenga
Republican

Republican Bill Huizenga, who was first elected to represent the 2nd district in 2010, sought re-election. He was unopposed for the Republican primary. Other third-party candidates on the ballot were Mary Buzuma for the Libertarian Party, Ronald Graeser for the U.S. Taxpayers Party, and William Opalicky for the Green Party. Roll Call rated the race as "Safe Republican", and Huizenga easily won re-election with 61.2% of the vote.

=== Republican primary ===
==== Candidates ====
===== Nominee =====
- Bill Huizenga, incumbent U.S. representative

===== Declined =====
- David Agema, state representative

==== Primary results ====
Republican primary results
Party	Candidate	Votes	%
Republican	Bill Huizenga (incumbent)	58,170	100.0
Total votes		58,170	100.0

=== Democratic primary ===
Muskegon city commissioner Willie German, Jr. ran in the August primary as a write-in candidate after David Takitaki, a political science professor at Adrian College and Muskegon Community College, was seeking the Democratic nomination to challenge Huizenga, but withdrew from the race for health reasons. Commissioner German was therefore on the ballot on the Democratic side.

==== Candidates ====
===== Nominee =====
- Willie German Jr, Muskegon city commissioner

===== Withdrawn =====
- David Takitaki, political science professor at Adrian College and Muskegon Community College

==== Primary results ====
Democratic primary results
Party	Candidate	Votes	%
Democratic	Willie German Jr. (write-in)	1,813	100.0
Total votes		1,813	100.0

=== General election ===
==== Endorsements ====
Bill Huizenga (R)

Organizations

- National Right to Life Committee
- NRA Political Victory Fund
- United States Chamber of Commerce

Newspapers

- Muskegon Chronicle

==== Predictions ====
Source	Ranking	As of
The Cook Political Report	Safe R	November 5, 2012
Rothenberg	Safe R	November 2, 2012
Roll Call	Safe R	November 4, 2012
Sabato's Crystal Ball	Safe R	November 5, 2012
NY Times	Safe R	November 4, 2012
RCP	Safe R	November 4, 2012
The Hill	Safe R	November 4, 2012

==== Results ====
Michigan's 2nd congressional district, 2012
Party	Candidate	Votes	%
Republican	Bill Huizenga (incumbent)	194,653	61.2
Democratic	Willie German, Jr.	108,973	34.2
Libertarian	Mary Buzuma	8,750	2.6
U.S. Taxpayers'	Ronald Graeser	3,176	1.1
Green	William Opalicky	2,715	0.9
Total votes		318,267	100.0
Republican hold			

== District 3 ==
2012 Michigan's 3rd congressional district election
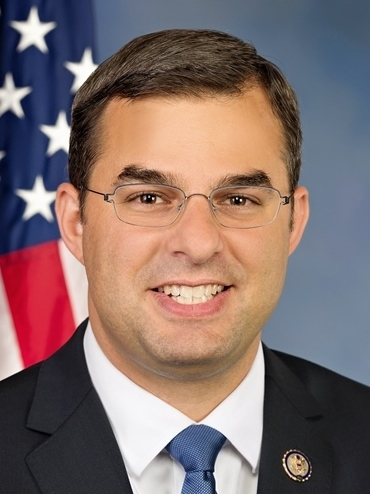

Nominee	Justin Amash	Steve Pestka
Party	Republican	Democratic
Popular vote	171,675	144,108
Percentage	52.6%	44.2%
- County results Amash: 50–60% Pestka: 50–60%
U.S. Representative before election
Justin Amash
Republican
Elected U.S. Representative
Justin Amash
Republican

Republican Justin Amash, who was first elected to represent the 3rd district in 2010, sought re-election and ran unopposed in the Republican primary. Libertarian Party candidate Bill Gelineau was also on the ballot.

In redistricting, the 3rd district was made more favorable to Democrats. Roll Call rated the race as "Likely Republican."

=== Republican primary ===
==== Candidates ====
===== Nominee =====
- Justin Amash, incumbent U.S. representative

===== Declined =====
- Terri Lynn Land, former Michigan Secretary of State

==== Primary results ====
Republican primary results
Party	Candidate	Votes	%
Republican	Justin Amash (incumbent)	51,113	100.0
Republican	Steven Lee Butler (write-in)	16	0.0
Total votes		51,129	100.0

=== Democratic primary ===
==== Candidates ====
===== Nominee =====
- Steve Pestka, former state representative, former judge, former Kent County Commissioner and small business owner

===== Eliminated in primary =====
- Trevor Thomas, former employee in the executive office of Jennifer Granholm

===== Declined =====
- Pat Miles, lawyer and nominee for this seat in 2010
- Mark Schauer, former U.S. representative

==== Endorsements ====
Steve Pestka

U.S. senators

- Carl Levin, U.S. senator (1979–present)

State legislators

- Gretchen Whitmer, Michigan Senate minority leader

Labor unions

- AFL-CIO
- Michigan Education Association
- Service Employees International Union
- United Auto Workers

Local officials

- John H. Logie, mayor of Grand Rapids (1992–2003)

Individuals

- Jocelyn Benson, law professor and nominee for secretary of state in 2010
Trevor Thomas

U.S. representatives

- Barney Frank, U.S. representative from Massachusetts's 4th congressional district (1981–present)
- Raul Grijalva, U.S. representative from Arizona's 7th congressional district (2003–present)

Statewide officials

- Jennifer Granholm, governor of Michigan (2003–2011)
- John Cherry, lieutenant governor of Michigan (2003–2011)
- Kathleen Kennedy Townsend, lieutenant governor of Maryland (1995–2003)

Organizations

- Equality Michigan
- National Organization for Women
- Planned Parenthood Action Fund
- Stonewall Democrats

Individuals

- Cate Edwards, attorney and daughter of former US Senator John Edwards

==== Primary results ====
Democratic primary results
Party	Candidate	Votes	%
Democratic	Steve Pestka	13,414	59.0
Democratic	Trevor Thomas	9,321	41.0
Total votes		22,735	100.0

=== General election ===
==== Endorsements ====
Justin Amash (R)

Organizations

- Citizens Against Government Waste
- National Federation of Independent Business
- Republican Liberty Caucus
- United States Chamber of Commerce

Newspapers

- The Detroit News
- Grand Rapids Press
Steve Pestka (D)

U.S. senators

- Carl Levin, U.S. senator (1979–present)
- Debbie Stabenow, U.S. senator (2001–present)

U.S. representatives

- Mark Schauer, U.S. representative from Michigan's 7th congressional district (2009–2011)
- Joe Schwarz, U.S. representative from Michigan's 7th congressional district (2005–2007)

Statewide officials

- Jennifer Granholm, governor of Michigan (2003–2011)

State legislators

- Gretchen Whitmer, Michigan Senate minority leader

Labor unions

- AFL-CIO
- International Association of Fire Fighters
- Laborers' International Union of North America
- Michigan Education Association
- National Association of Letter Carriers
- Service Employees International Union
- United Auto Workers

Organizations

- Democratic Congressional Campaign Committee "Emerging Races" Program
- Equality Michigan

Newspapers

- Detroit Free Press

Local officials

- John H. Logie, mayor of Grand Rapids (1992–2003)

Individuals

- Jocelyn Benson, law professor and nominee for secretary of state in 2010

==== Polling ====
Poll source	Date(s) administered	Sample size	Margin of error	Justin Amash (R)	Steve Pestka (D)	Undecided
Glengariff Group	October 17–18, 2012	400	± 4.9%	34%	35%	29%
Greenberg Quinlan Rosner Research	October 8–9, 2012	400	± 4.9%	48%	44%	8%
Greenberg Quinlan Rosner Research	August 18–21, 2012	501	± 4.4%	50%	42%	8%

==== Predictions ====
Source	Ranking	As of
The Cook Political Report	Likely R	November 5, 2012
Rothenberg	Safe R	November 2, 2012
Roll Call	Likely R	November 4, 2012
Sabato's Crystal Ball	Lean R	November 5, 2012
NY Times	Lean R	November 4, 2012
RCP	Likely R	November 4, 2012
The Hill	Safe R	November 4, 2012

==== Results ====
Michigan's 3rd congressional district, 2012
Party	Candidate	Votes	%
Republican	Justin Amash (incumbent)	171,675	52.6
Democratic	Steve Pestka	144,108	44.2
Libertarian	Bill Gelineau	10,498	3.2
Independent	Steven Butler (write-in)	2	0.0
Total votes		326,283	100.0
Republican hold			

== District 4 ==
2012 Michigan's 4th congressional district election
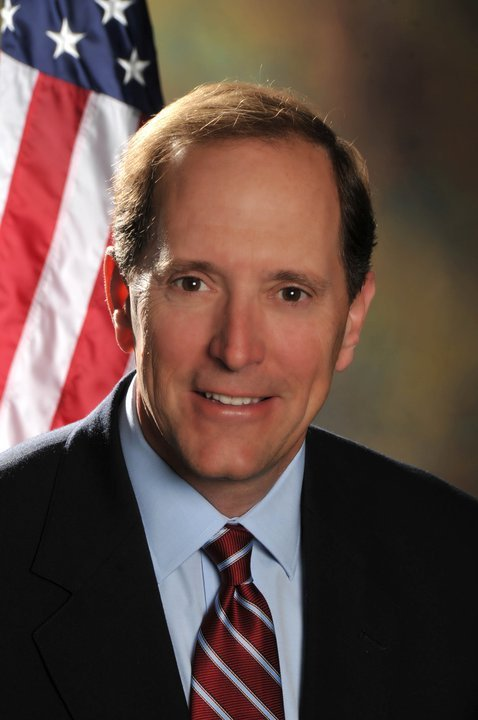

Nominee	Dave Camp	Debra Freidell Wirth
Party	Republican	Democratic
Popular vote	197,386	104,996
Percentage	63.1%	33.6%
- County results Camp: 50–60% 60–70% 70–80%
U.S. Representative before election
Dave Camp
Republican
Elected U.S. Representative
Dave Camp
Republican

Republican David Lee Camp, who had represented the 4th district since 1993 and previously represented the 10th district from 1991 until 1993, sought re-election. Roll Call rated the race as "Likely Republican".

=== Republican primary ===
==== Candidates ====
===== Nominee =====
- David Lee Camp, incumbent U.S. representative

==== Primary results ====
Republican primary results
Party	Candidate	Votes	%
Republican	Dave Camp (incumbent)	67,028	100.0
Total votes		67,028	100.0

=== Democratic primary ===
==== Candidates ====
===== Nominee =====
- Debra Friedell Wirth, attorney

==== Primary results ====
Democratic primary results
Party	Candidate	Votes	%
Democratic	Debra Friedell Wirth	20,519	100.0
Total votes		20,519	100.0

=== General election ===
==== Endorsements ====
Dave Camp (R)

Organizations

- National Right to Life Committee
- NRA Political Victory Fund
- United States Chamber of Commerce

Newspapers

- Midland Daily News
- Saginaw News
Debra Freidell Wirth (D)

Labor unions

- AFL-CIO
- United Auto Workers

Organizations

- Equality Michigan

==== Predictions ====
Source	Ranking	As of
The Cook Political Report	Safe R	November 5, 2012
Rothenberg	Safe R	November 2, 2012
Roll Call	Safe R	November 4, 2012
Sabato's Crystal Ball	Safe R	November 5, 2012
NY Times	Safe R	November 4, 2012
RCP	Safe R	November 4, 2012
The Hill	Safe R	November 4, 2012

==== Results ====
Michigan's 4th congressional district, 2012
Party	Candidate	Votes	%
Republican	Dave Camp (incumbent)	197,386	63.1
Democratic	Debra Freidell Wirth	104,996	33.6
Libertarian	John Gelineau	4,285	1.4
U.S. Taxpayers'	George Zimmer	3,506	1.1
Green	Pat Timmons	2,776	0.9
Total votes		312,949	100.0
Republican hold			

== District 5 ==
2012 Michigan's 5th congressional district election
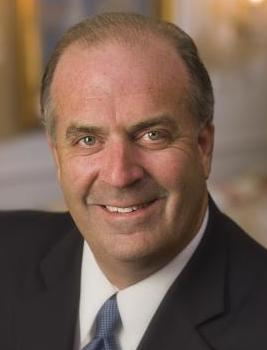

Nominee	Dan Kildee	Jim Slezak
Party	Democratic	Republican
Popular vote	214,531	103,931
Percentage	65.0%	31.5%
- County results Kildee: 40–50% 50–60% 60–70% 70–80%
U.S. Representative before election
Dale Kildee
Democratic
Elected U.S. Representative
Dan Kildee
Democratic

Democrat Dale Kildee, who had represented the 5th district since 2003, and previously represented the 9th district from 1993 until 2003 and the 7th district from 1977 until 1993, chose to retire rather than run for re-election in 2012.

Flint school board member David Davenport ran as an independent. Also running was Gregory Creswell of the Libertarian Party.

Roll Call rated the race as "Safe Democratic".

=== Democratic primary ===
==== Candidates ====
===== Nominee =====
- Dan Kildee, former Genesee County treasurer and nephew of Dale Kildee

===== Declined =====
- Jim Barcia, former U.S. representative
- Deborah Cherry, Genesee County treasurer
- John Cherry, former lieutenant governor
- David Crim, union organizer
- John Gleason, state senator
- Dale Kildee, incumbent U.S. representative
- Woodrow Stanley, state representative

==== Primary results ====
Democratic primary results
Party	Candidate	Votes	%
Democratic	Dan Kildee	51,840	100.0
Total votes		51,840	100.0

=== Republican primary ===
==== Candidates ====
===== Nominee =====
- Jim Slezak, former Democratic state representative

===== Eliminated in primary =====
- Tom Wassa, Tuscola County public safety officer

==== Primary results ====
Republican primary results
Party	Candidate	Votes	%
Republican	Jim Slezak	16,951	63.9
Republican	Tom Wassa	9,583	36.1
Total votes		26,534	100.0

=== General election ===
==== Endorsements ====
Dan Kildee (D)

Labor unions

- AFL-CIO
- National Association of Letter Carriers
- Service Employees International Union
- United Auto Workers

Organizations

- Democratic Congressional Campaign Committee "Majority Makers" Program
- Equality Michigan
- National Organization for Women
- Planned Parenthood Action Fund
- Sierra Club

Newspapers

- Detroit Free Press
- The Detroit News
- The Flint Journal

==== Predictions ====
Source	Ranking	As of
The Cook Political Report	Safe D	November 5, 2012
Rothenberg	Safe D	November 2, 2012
Roll Call	Safe D	November 4, 2012
Sabato's Crystal Ball	Safe D	November 5, 2012
NY Times	Safe D	November 4, 2012
RCP	Safe D	November 4, 2012
The Hill	Safe D	November 4, 2012

==== Results ====
Michigan's 5th congressional district, 2012
Party	Candidate	Votes	%
Democratic	Dan Kildee	214,531	65.0
Republican	Jim Slezak	103,931	31.5
Independent	David Davenport	6,694	2.0
Libertarian	Gregory Creswell	4,990	1.5
Total votes		330,146	100.0
Democratic hold			

== District 6 ==
2012 Michigan's 6th congressional district election
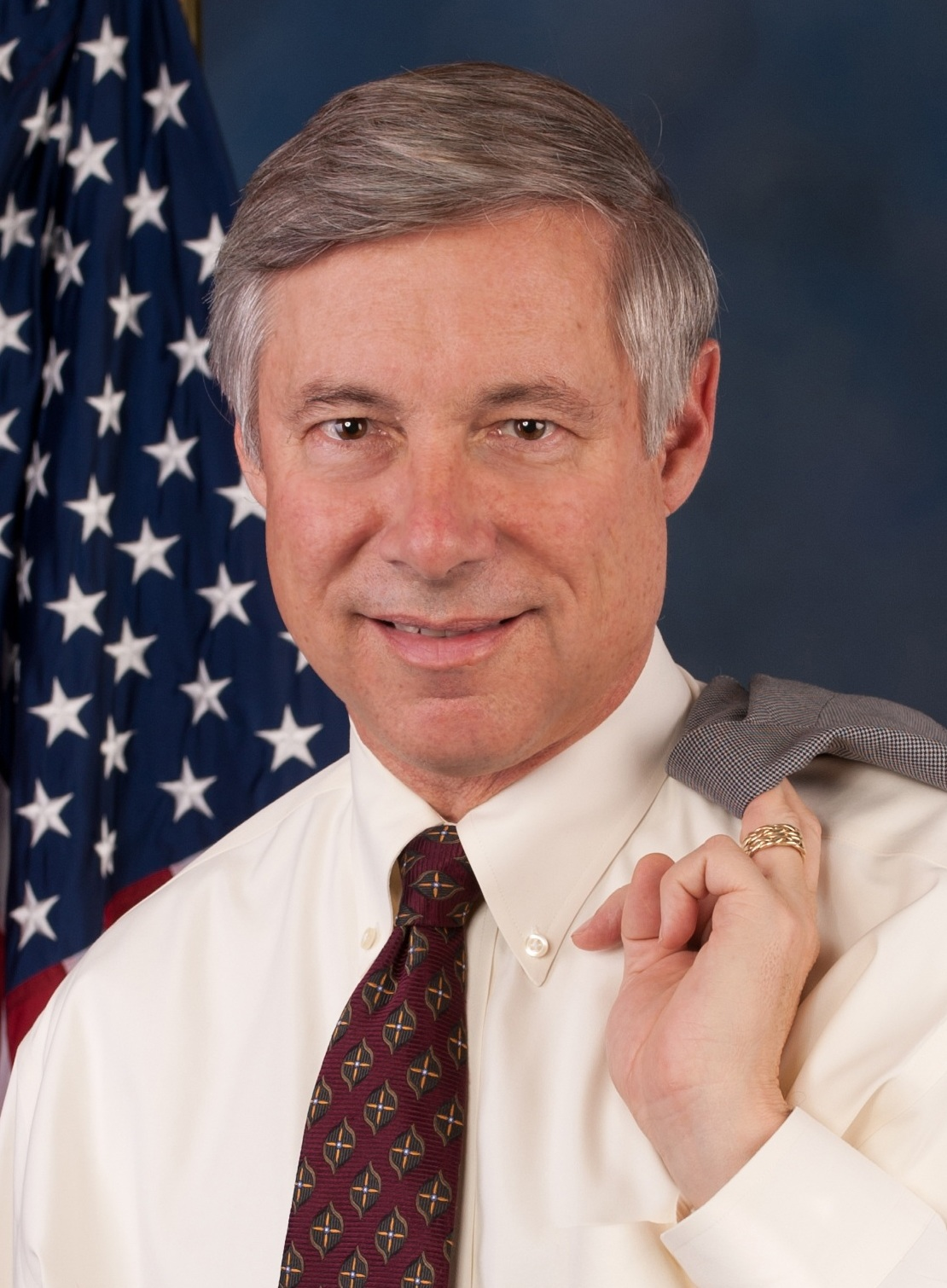

Nominee	Fred Upton	Mike O'Brien
Party	Republican	Democratic
Popular vote	174,955	136,563
Percentage	54.6%	42.6%
- County results Upton: 40–50% 50–60% 60–70%
U.S. Representative before election
Fred Upton
Republican
Elected U.S. Representative
Fred Upton
Republican

Republican Fred Upton, who had represented the 6th district since 1993 and previously represented the 4th district from 1987 until 1993, sought re-election.

Jason Gatties, a business manager and security consultant from St. Joseph, received the US Taxpayers Party of Michigan's nomination at their state convention on June 16, 2012. Christie Gelineau received the Libertarian Party's nomination at their state convention on June 2, 2012. Roll Call rated the race as "Likely Republican".

=== Republican primary ===
==== Candidates ====
===== Nominee =====
- Fred Upton, incumbent U.S. representative

===== Eliminated in primary =====
- Jack Hoogendyk, former state representative and candidate for this seat in 2010

==== Polling ====
Poll source	Date(s) administered	Sample size	Margin of error	Jack Hoogendyk	Fred Upton	Undecided
EPIC-MRA	July 28–29, 2012	800	± 3.5%	31%	61%	8%

==== Primary results ====
Republican primary results
Party	Candidate	Votes	%
Republican	Fred Upton (incumbent)	34,581	66.3
Republican	Jack Hoogendyk	17,561	33.7
Total votes		52,142	100.0

=== Democratic primary ===
==== Candidates ====
===== Nominee =====
- Mike O'Brien, project leader at Herman Miller and former organic farmer

===== Withdrawn =====
- John Waltz, Iraq and Afghanistan war veteran, nominee for Kentucky's 4th congressional district in 2010; dropped out in February 2012 due to illness

==== Primary results ====
Democratic primary results
Party	Candidate	Votes	%
Democratic	Mike O'Brien	14,224	100.0
Total votes		14,224	100.0

=== General election ===
==== Endorsements ====
Fred Upton (R)

Organizations

- National Right to Life Committee
- NRA Political Victory Fund
- United States Chamber of Commerce
Mike O'Brien (D)

Labor unions

- AFL-CIO
- United Auto Workers

Organizations

- Democratic Congressional Campaign Committee "Emerging Races" Program
- Equality Michigan

==== Predictions ====
Source	Ranking	As of
The Cook Political Report	Safe R	November 5, 2012
Rothenberg	Safe R	November 2, 2012
Roll Call	Safe R	November 4, 2012
Sabato's Crystal Ball	Safe R	November 5, 2012
NY Times	Safe R	November 4, 2012
RCP	Safe R	November 4, 2012
The Hill	Likely R	November 4, 2012

==== Results ====
Michigan's 6th congressional district, 2012
Party	Candidate	Votes	%
Republican	Fred Upton (incumbent)	174,955	54.6
Democratic	Mike O'Brien	136,563	42.6
Libertarian	Christie Gelineau	6,366	2.1
Independent	Jason Gatties	2,591	0.7
Total votes		320,475	100.0
Republican hold			

== District 7 ==
2012 Michigan's 7th congressional district election
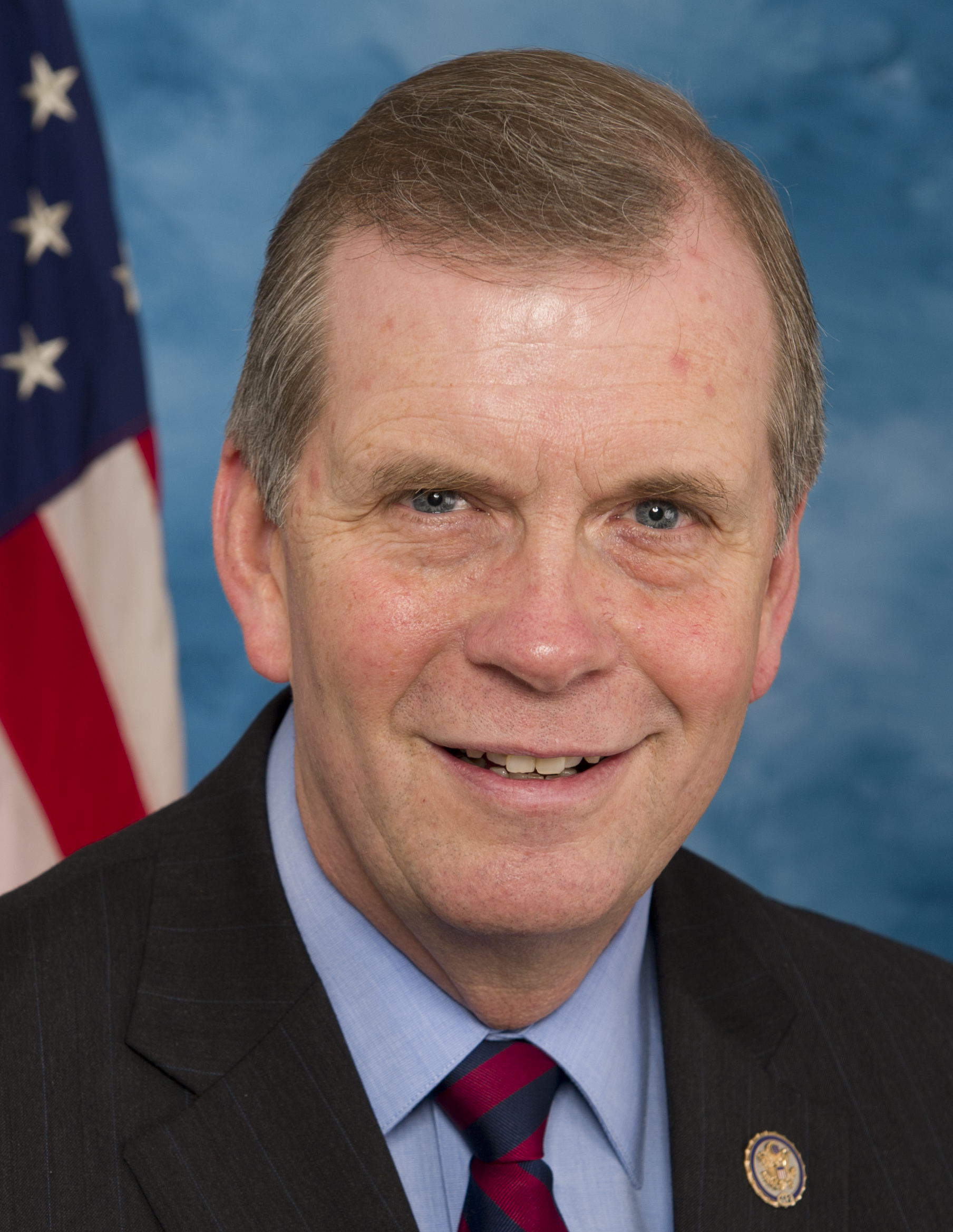

Nominee	Tim Walberg	Kurt R. Haskell
Party	Republican	Democratic
Popular vote	169,668	136,849
Percentage	53.3%	43.0%
- County results Walberg: 50–60% 60–70% Haskell: 40–50%
U.S. Representative before election
Tim Walberg
Republican
Elected U.S. Representative
Tim Walberg
Republican

In redistricting, the 7th district was made slightly more favorable to Republicans: McCain received less than one percentage point more of the vote in the 2008 presidential election in the newly drawn district compared to the former district.

Republican Tim Walberg, who had represented the 7th district since January 2011 and previously served from 2007 until 2009, ran for re-election. Roll Call rated the race as "Likely Republican".

=== Republican primary ===
==== Candidates ====
===== Nominee =====
- Tim Walberg, incumbent U.S. representative

===== Eliminated in primary =====
- Dan Davis, businessman and former police officer
- Mike Stahly, former member of Potterville City Council and candidate for this seat in 2010

==== Primary results ====
Republican primary results
Party	Candidate	Votes	%
Republican	Tim Walberg (incumbent)	45,592	76.0
Republican	Dan Davis	14,386	24.0
Total votes		59,978	100.0

=== Democratic primary ===
Joe Schwarz, who represented the 7th district from 2005 to 2007 as a Republican and was defeated by Walberg in the Republican primary in 2006, was recruited by the Democratic Congressional Campaign Committee.

==== Candidates ====
===== Nominee =====
- Kurt Haskell, attorney

===== Eliminated in primary =====
- Ruben Marquez, chair of the Jackson County Democratic Party

===== Declined =====
- Mark Schauer, former U.S. representative
- Joe Schwarz, former Republican U.S. representative

==== Endorsements ====
Ruben Marquez

Labor unions

- United Auto Workers

==== Primary results ====
Democratic primary results
Party	Candidate	Votes	%
Democratic	Kurt Richard Haskell	18,812	66.7
Democratic	Ruben Marquez	9,371	33.3
Total votes		28,183	100.0

=== General election ===
==== Endorsements ====
Tim Walberg (R)

Organizations

- National Federation of Independent Business
- National Right to Life Committee
- NRA Political Victory Fund
- United States Chamber of Commerce

Newspapers

- Jackson Citizen Patriot
Mike O'Brien (D)

Labor unions

- United Auto Workers

==== Predictions ====
Source	Ranking	As of
The Cook Political Report	Safe R	November 5, 2012
Rothenberg	Safe R	November 2, 2012
Roll Call	Safe R	November 4, 2012
Sabato's Crystal Ball	Safe R	November 5, 2012
NY Times	Lean R	November 4, 2012
RCP	Safe R	November 4, 2012
The Hill	Safe R	November 4, 2012

==== Results ====
Michigan's 7th congressional district, 2012
Party	Candidate	Votes	%
Republican	Tim Walberg (incumbent)	169,668	53.3
Democratic	Kurt R. Haskell	136,849	43.0
Libertarian	Ken Proctor	8,088	2.6
Green	Richard Wunsch	3,464	1.1
Total votes		318,069	100.0
Republican hold			

== District 8 ==
2012 Michigan's 8th congressional district election
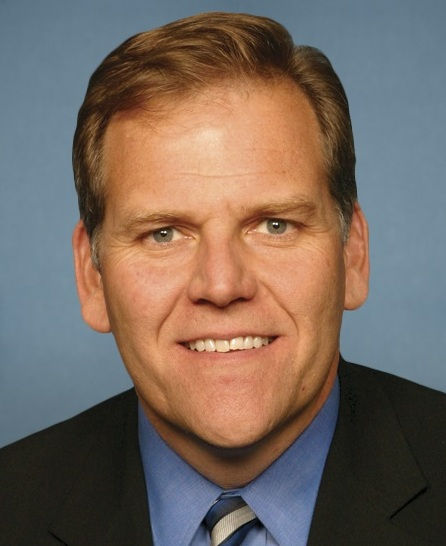

Nominee	Mike Rogers	Lance Enderle
Party	Republican	Democratic
Popular vote	202,217	128,657
Percentage	58.6%	37.3%
- County results Rogers: 60–70% Enderle: 50–60%
U.S. Representative before election
Mike Rogers
Republican
Elected U.S. Representative
Mike Rogers
Republican

Republican Mike Rogers, who had represented the 8th district since 2001, sought re-election.

Other candidates were Daniel Goebel of the Libertarian Party and independent candidate Preston Brooks. Roll Call rated the race as "Likely Republican".

=== Republican primary ===
==== Candidates ====
===== Nominee =====
- Mike Rogers, incumbent U.S. representative

===== Eliminated in primary =====
- Brian Hetrick, mechanical engineer
- Vernon Molnar

==== Primary results ====
Republican primary results
Party	Candidate	Votes	%
Republican	Mike Rogers (incumbent)	56,208	85.7
Republican	Brian Hetrick	6,098	9.3
Republican	Vernon Molnar	3,257	5.0
Total votes		65,563	100.0

=== Democratic primary ===
==== Candidates ====
===== Nominee =====
- Lance Enderle, former teacher and nominee for this seat in 2010

==== Primary results ====
Democratic primary results
Party	Candidate	Votes	%
Democratic	Lance Enderle	29,322	100.0
Total votes		29,322	100.0

=== General election ===
==== Endorsements ====
Mike Rogers (R)

Organizations

- National Right to Life Committee
- NRA Political Victory Fund
- United States Chamber of Commerce

Newspapers

- Livingston County Daily Press & Argus
Lance Enderle (D)

Labor unions

- AFL-CIO
- American Federation of Teachers
- United Auto Workers

Organizations

- Equality Michigan
- National Organization for Women

==== Predictions ====
Source	Ranking	As of
The Cook Political Report	Safe R	November 5, 2012
Rothenberg	Safe R	November 2, 2012
Roll Call	Safe R	November 4, 2012
Sabato's Crystal Ball	Safe R	November 5, 2012
NY Times	Safe R	November 4, 2012
RCP	Safe R	November 4, 2012
The Hill	Safe R	November 4, 2012

==== Results ====
Michigan's 8th congressional district, 2012
Party	Candidate	Votes	%
Republican	Mike Rogers (incumbent)	202,217	58.6
Democratic	Lance Enderle	128,657	37.3
Libertarian	Daniel Goebel	8,083	2.3
Independent	Preston Brooks	6,097	1.8
Total votes		345,054	100.0
Republican hold			

== District 9 ==
2012 Michigan's 9th congressional district election
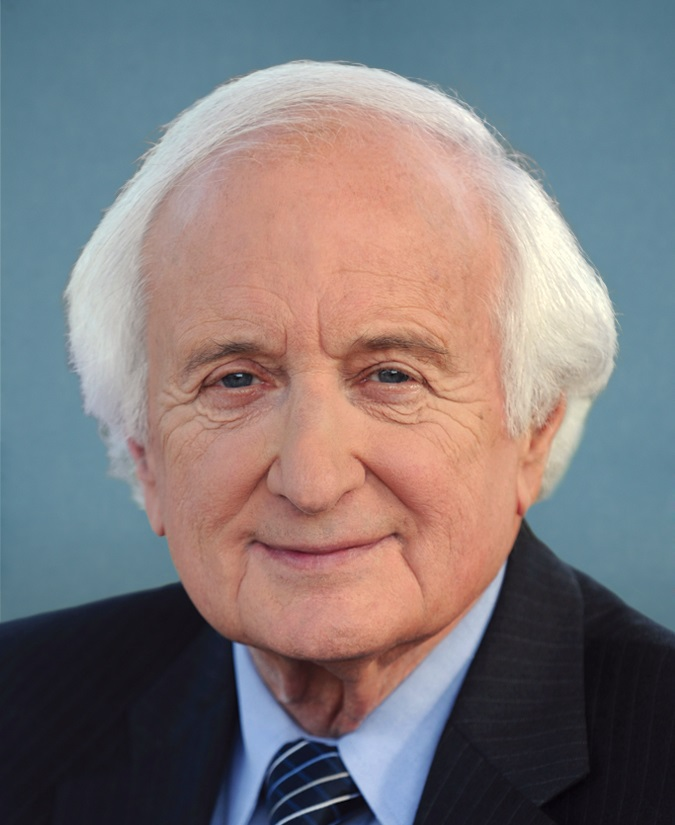

Nominee	Sander Levin	Don Volaric
Party	Democratic	Republican
Popular vote	208,846	114,760
Percentage	61.8%	34.0%
- County results Levin: 50–60% 60–70%
U.S. Representative before election
Sander Levin
Democratic
Elected U.S. Representative
Sander Levin
Democratic

In redistricting, the homes of Democratic Representatives Sander Levin and Gary Peters were drawn into the 9th district, which comprises mostly Macomb County but also includes a part of Oakland County. Levin, who had represented the 12th district since 1993 and previously represented the 17th district from 1983 until 1993, sought re-election here. Peters, who had represented the 9th district since 2009, sought re-election in the redrawn 14th district.

Jim Fulner, an engineer from Berkley, earned the Libertarian Party nomination at their state convention on June 2, 2012, in Livonia. Julia Williams, the 2010 Green Party Candidate for the same seat, was nominated again at the 2012 Michigan Green Party convention, on June 9, 2012, in Mount Pleasant. Lester Townsend received the US Taxpayers Party of Michigan's nomination at their state convention on June 16, 2012. This marks the fourth election cycle in a row in which Townsend challenged Levin for his seat. Roll Call rated the race as "Likely Democratic".

=== Democratic primary ===
==== Candidates ====
===== Nominee =====
- Sander Levin, incumbent U.S. representative for the 12th district

===== Withdrawn =====
- Allen James O'Neil, businessman

==== Primary results ====
Democratic primary results
Party	Candidate	Votes	%
Democratic	Sander Levin (incumbent)	55,198	100.0
Total votes		55,198	100.0

=== Republican primary ===
==== Candidates ====
===== Nominee =====
- Don Volaric, businessman and nominee for the 12th district in 2010

===== Eliminated in primary =====
- Gregory Dildilian, woodworker

==== Primary results ====
Republican primary results
Party	Candidate	Votes	%
Republican	Don Volaric	24,521	61.6
Republican	Gregory C. Dildilian	15,283	38.4
Total votes		39,804	100.0

=== General election ===
==== Endorsements ====
Sander Levin (D)

Labor unions

- AFL-CIO
- National Association of Letter Carriers

Organizations

- Equality Michigan
- Planned Parenthood Action Fund
- Sierra Club

==== Predictions ====
Source	Ranking	As of
The Cook Political Report	Safe D	November 5, 2012
Rothenberg	Safe D	November 2, 2012
Roll Call	Safe D	November 4, 2012
Sabato's Crystal Ball	Safe D	November 5, 2012
NY Times	Safe D	November 4, 2012
RCP	Safe D	November 4, 2012
The Hill	Safe D	November 4, 2012

==== Results ====
Michigan's 9th congressional district, 2012
Party	Candidate	Votes	%
Democratic	Sander Levin (incumbent)	208,846	61.8
Republican	Don Volaric	114,760	34.0
Libertarian	Jim Fulner	6,100	1.8
Green	Julia Williams	4,708	1.4
U.S. Taxpayers'	Les Townsend	2,902	0.9
Total votes		337,316	100.0
Democratic hold			

== District 10 ==
2012 Michigan's 10th congressional district election
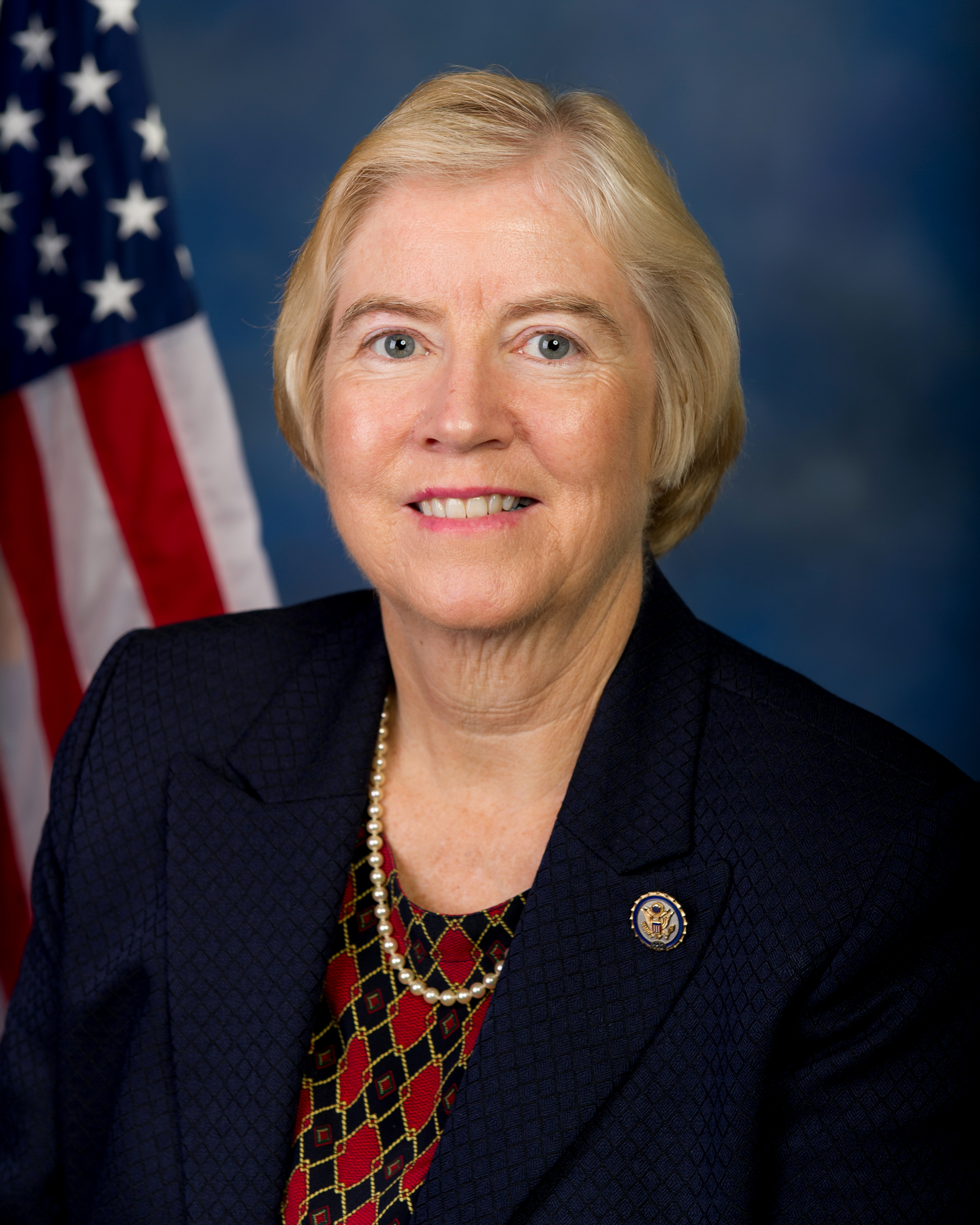

Nominee	Candice Miller	Chuck Stadler
Party	Republican	Democratic
Popular vote	226,075	97,734
Percentage	68.8%	29.7%
- County results Miller: 60–70% 70–80%
U.S. Representative before election
Candice Miller
Republican
Elected U.S. Representative
Candice Miller
Republican

Republican Candice Miller, who had represented the 10th district since 2003, sought re-election. Roll Call rated the race as "Likely Republican".

=== Republican primary ===
==== Candidates ====
===== Nominee =====
- Candice Miller, incumbent U.S. representative

==== Primary results ====
Republican primary results
Party	Candidate	Votes	%
Republican	Candice S. Miller (incumbent)	68,063	100.0
Total votes		68,063	100.0

=== Democratic primary ===
==== Candidates ====
===== Nominee =====
- Chuck Stadler, practical nurse and accountant

===== Eliminated in primary =====
- Jerome Quinn, attorney

==== Primary results ====
Democratic primary results
Party	Candidate	Votes	%
Democratic	Chuck Stadler	13,480	58.1
Democratic	Jerome George Quinn	9,705	41.9
Total votes		23,185	100.0

=== General election ===
==== Endorsements ====
Candice Miller (R)

Labor unions

- National Association of Letter Carriers

Organizations

- National Right to Life Committee
- NRA Political Victory Fund
- United States Chamber of Commerce

==== Predictions ====
Source	Ranking	As of
The Cook Political Report	Safe R	November 5, 2012
Rothenberg	Safe R	November 2, 2012
Roll Call	Safe R	November 4, 2012
Sabato's Crystal Ball	Safe R	November 5, 2012
NY Times	Safe R	November 4, 2012
RCP	Safe R	November 4, 2012
The Hill	Safe R	November 4, 2012

==== Results ====
Michigan's 10th congressional district, 2012
Party	Candidate	Votes	%
Republican	Candice Miller (incumbent)	226,075	68.8
Democratic	Chuck Stadler	97,734	29.7
Libertarian	Bhagwan Dashairya	4,803	1.5
Total votes		328,612	100.0
Republican hold			

== District 11 ==
2012 Michigan's 11th congressional district election
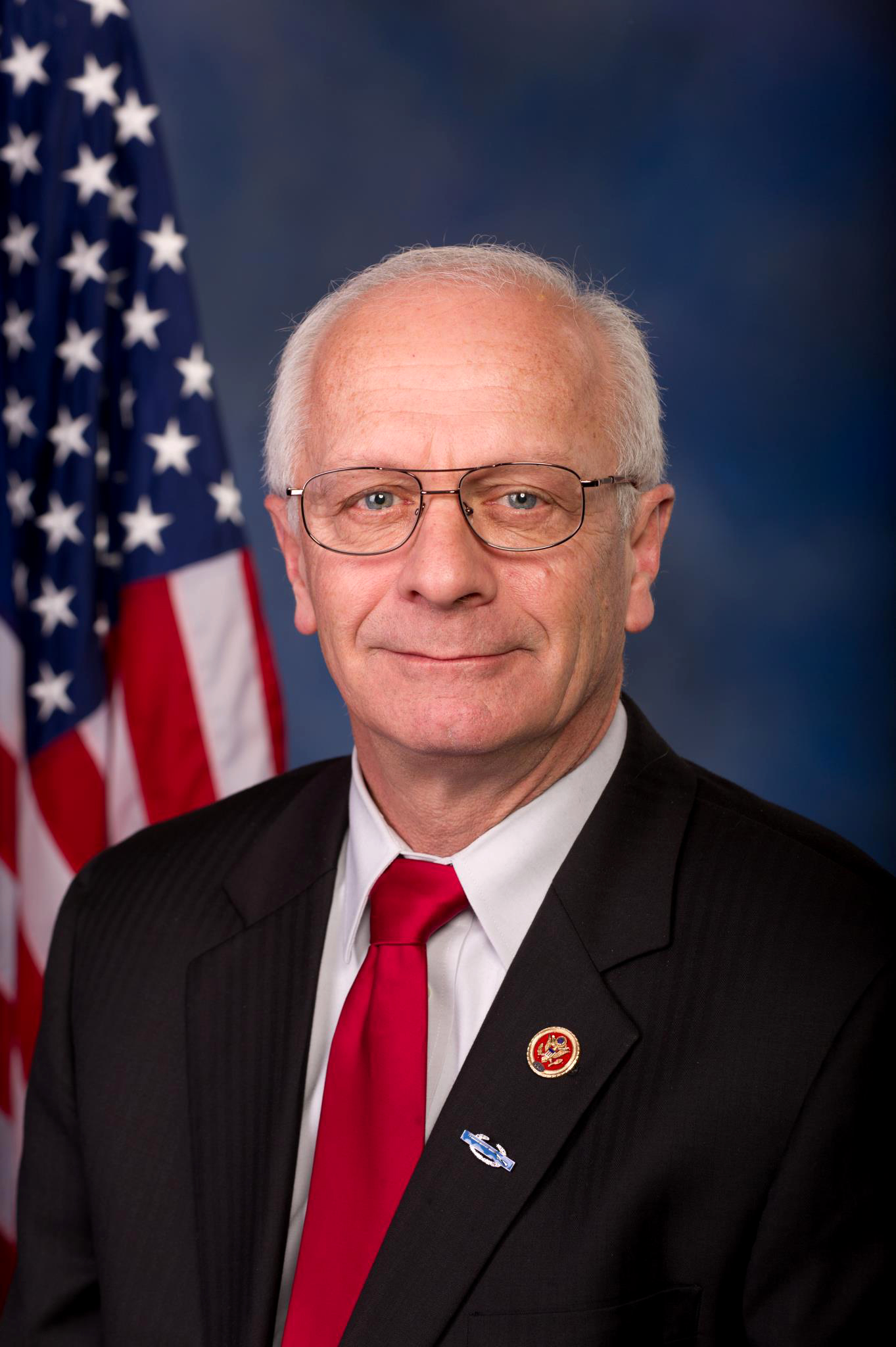

Nominee	Kerry Bentivolio	Syed Taj
Party	Republican	Democratic
Popular vote	181,788	158,879
Percentage	50.8%	44.4%
- County results Bentivolio: 40–50% 50–60%
U.S. Representative before election
Thad McCotter
Republican
Elected U.S. Representative
Kerry Bentivolio
Republican

Thad McCotter had represented the old 11th district since 2003 and sought the Republican presidential nomination. After poor polling results, McCotter ended his presidential campaign and announced plans to run again for his seat in Congress. On May 26, 2012, the Michigan Secretary of State announced that McCotter had fallen well short of the required 1,000 petition signatures required for him to qualify for the primary ballot. In what state officials described as a level of fraud unprecedented in Michigan political history, subsequent reviews of McCotter's petitions revealed that over 85 percent of the signatures were invalid. Most of them were either duplicates or signatures that appeared to have been pasted from past years' petitions. Conceding that the signatures were indeed invalid, McCotter announced he would mount a write-in bid for his seat; however, he decided not to continue with his write-in bid on June 2 and announced his intention to retire after completing his term. McCotter suddenly resigned from his seat on July 6, leaving the 11th district unrepresented.

Secretary of State Ruth Johnson found the apparent fraud egregious enough to turn the evidence over to the Michigan Attorney General's office to determine if laws were broken regarding the invalid signatures. The Michigan Attorney General's office charged four McCotter aides with forgery, although McCotter was not charged with any wrongdoing.

McCotter's resignation resulted in a special election, which was expected to cost taxpayers $650,000.

As a result of Republican-leaning areas of the old 9th district being drawn into the new 11th, the 11th district was made more favorable to Republicans. McCain received four percentage points more of the vote in the 2008 presidential election in the newly drawn district compared to the current district. While Roll Call rated this race as "Likely Republican" before the primary, they changed the rating to "Leans Republican". It subsequrently changed back to "Likely Republican."

=== Republican primary ===
For the regular primary held August 7, 2012, for the upcoming two-year term in Congress, Kerry Bentivolio, a veteran and former teacher who had already planned to challenge McCotter, was left as the only candidate on the Republican primary ballot. The Troy Republican Club, U.S. House member Justin Amash, Tea Party groups and Ron Paul's PAC all endorsed Bentivolio. Other Republicans, including Oakland County Executive L. Brooks Patterson, refused to endorse Bentivolio and instead endorsed former state senator Nancy Cassis as a write-in candidate. Bentivolio defeated Cassis in the August 7 primary, and was the only Republican candidate on the ballot in areas covered by the new 11th. Cassis and Drexel Morton also ran as write-in candidates.

Bentivolio was endorsed by Gov. Rick Snyder, Lt. Gov. Brian Calley, Senator Rand Paul; Congress members Candice Miller, Justin Amash, Dan Banishek and Ron Paul; and former officeholders Rick Santorum and Peter Hoekstra.

==== Candidates ====
===== Nominee =====
- Kerry Bentivolio, veteran and former teacher

===== Eliminated in primary =====
- Nancy Cassis, former state senator

===== Declined =====
- Mike Kowall, state senator
- Rocky Raczkowski, former state representative, nominee for U.S. Senate in 2002 and nominee for 9th district in 2010
- David Trott, attorney
- Paul Welday, former Oakland County Republican Party chair

===== Disqualified =====
- Thad McCotter, incumbent U.S. representative

==== Primary results ====
Republican primary results
Party	Candidate	Votes	%
Republican	Kerry Bentivolio	42,470	66.3
Republican	Nancy Cassis (write-in)	21,436	33.4
Republican	Drexel Morton (write-in)	161	0.3
Republican	Loren Bennett (write-in)	14	0.0
Total votes		64,081	100.0

=== Democratic primary ===
==== Candidates ====
===== Nominee =====
- Dr. Syed Taj, member of the Canton Township Board of Trustees

===== Eliminated in primary =====
- Bill Roberts, follower of Lyndon LaRouche

===== Declined =====
- David Curson, labor activist and nominee for this seat in 2012 special election

==== Primary results ====
Democratic primary results
Party	Candidate	Votes	%
Democratic	Syed Taj	21,953	58.9
Democratic	William F. Roberts	15,338	41.1
Total votes		37,291	100.0

=== General election ===
==== Endorsements ====
Kerry Bentivolio (R)

Organizations

- National Republican Congressional Committee "Young Guns" Program
- National Right to Life Committee
- NRA Political Victory Fund
- Republican Liberty Caucus
- Tea Party Express

Newspapers

- The Detroit News
Syed Taj (D)

Labor unions

- AFL-CIO

Organizations

- Democratic Congressional Campaign Committee "Emerging Races" Program
- Equality Michigan
- National Organization for Women

Newspapers

- Detroit Free Press

==== Polling ====
Poll source	Date(s) administered	Sample size	Margin of error	Kerry Bentivolio (R)	Syed Taj (D)	Others	Undecided
FMWB (D)	October 22–23, 2012	392	± 5.0%	47%	39%	5%	9%

==== Predictions ====
Source	Ranking	As of
The Cook Political Report	Lean R	November 5, 2012
Rothenberg	Lean R	November 2, 2012
Roll Call	Likely R	November 4, 2012
Sabato's Crystal Ball	Lean R	November 5, 2012
NY Times	Lean R	November 4, 2012
RCP	Tossup	November 4, 2012
The Hill	Likely R	November 4, 2012

==== Results ====
Michigan's 11th congressional district, 2012
Party	Candidate	Votes	%
Republican	Kerry Bentivolio	181,788	50.8
Democratic	Syed Taj	158,879	44.4
Libertarian	John Tatar	9,637	2.7
Green	Steven Paul Duke	4,569	1.3
Natural Law	Daniel Johnson	3,251	0.9
n/a	Write-ins	15	0.0
Total votes		358,139	100.0
Republican gain from Democratic			

Democratic candidate David Curson defeated Kerry Bentivolio in the special general election, conducted in the 2012-configured 11th district only, and coinciding with the regular general election on November 6.

== District 12 ==
2012 Michigan's 12th congressional district election
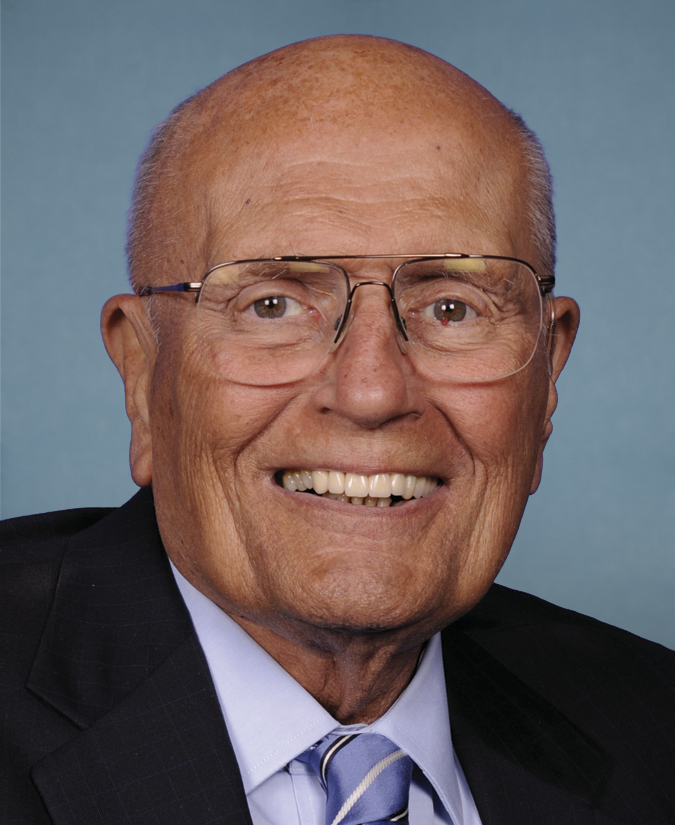

Nominee	John Dingell	Cynthia Kallgren
Party	Democratic	Republican
Popular vote	216,884	92,472
Percentage	67.9%	29.0%
- County results Dingell: 60–70% 70–80%
U.S. Representative before election
John Dingell
Democratic
Elected U.S. Representative
John Dingell
Democratic

Democrat John Dingell, who had represented the 15th district since 2003 and previously from 1955 until 1965, and previously represented the 16th district from 1965 until 2003, sought re-election here. Roll Call rated the race as "Safe Democratic".

=== Democratic primary ===
==== Candidates ====
===== Nominee =====
- John Dingell, former U.S. representative for the 15th district

===== Eliminated in primary =====
- Daniel Marcin, doctorate student at the University of Michigan

===== Declined =====
- Sander Levin, incumbent U.S. representative (running in the 9th district)

==== Primary results ====
Democratic primary results
Party	Candidate	Votes	%
Democratic	John Dingell (incumbent)	41,116	78.5
Democratic	Daniel Marcin	11,226	21.5
Total votes		52,342	100.0

=== Republican primary ===
==== Candidates ====
===== Nominee =====
- Cynthia Kallgren, former candidate for state representative

===== Eliminated in primary =====
- Karen Jacobsen, businesswoman

==== Primary results ====
Republican primary results
Party	Candidate	Votes	%
Republican	Cynthia Kallgren	12,028	50.7
Republican	Karen E. Jacobsen	11,670	49.2
Republican	Timothy Kachinski (write-in)	10	0.1
Total votes		23,708	100.0

=== General election ===
==== Endorsements ====
John Dingell (D)

Labor unions

- AFL-CIO
- National Association of Letter Carriers

==== Predictions ====
Source	Ranking	As of
The Cook Political Report	Safe D	November 5, 2012
Rothenberg	Safe D	November 2, 2012
Roll Call	Safe D	November 4, 2012
Sabato's Crystal Ball	Safe D	November 5, 2012
NY Times	Safe D	November 4, 2012
RCP	Safe D	November 4, 2012
The Hill	Safe D	November 4, 2012

==== Results ====
Michigan's 12th congressional district, 2012
Party	Candidate	Votes	%
Democratic	John D. Dingell (incumbent)	216,884	67.9
Republican	Cynthia Kallgren	92,472	29.0
Libertarian	Richard Secula	9,867	3.1
Total votes		319,223	100.0
Democratic hold			

== District 13 ==
2012 Michigan's 13th congressional district election
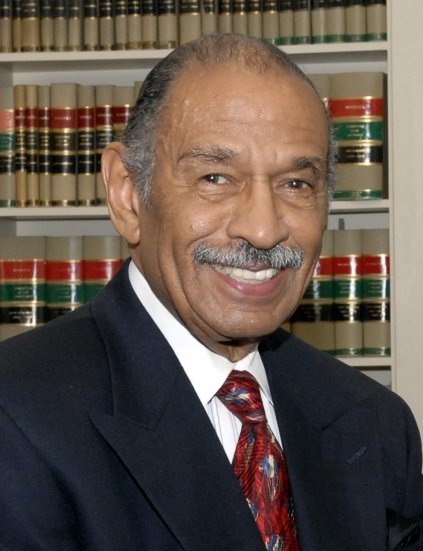

Nominee	John Conyers, Jr.	Harry T. Sawicki
Party	Democratic	Republican
Popular vote	235,336	38,769
Percentage	82.8%	13.6%
- County results John conyers: 80–90%
U.S. Representative before election
John Conyers, Jr.
Democratic
Elected U.S. Representative
John Conyers, Jr.
Democratic

Democrat John Conyers, who had represented the 14th district since 1993 and previously represented the 1st district from 1965 until 1993, sought re-election in the new 13th district.

The Libertarian Party of Michigan nominated Chris Sharer of Westland as their candidate. Martin Gray was the U.S. Taxpayers Party candidate. Roll Call rated the race as "Safe Democratic".

=== Democratic primary ===
==== Candidates ====
===== Nominee =====
- John Conyers, incumbent U.S. representative

===== Eliminated in primary =====
- Glenn S. Anderson, state senator
- Shanelle Jackson, state representative
- Bert Johnson, state senator
- John Goci Wayne-Westland, school board member

===== Disqualified =====
- Godfrey Dillard, attorney

===== Declined =====
- Hansen Clarke, incumbent U.S. representative (running in the 14th district)

==== Endorsements ====
John Conyers

Labor unions

- AFL-CIO

==== Polling ====
Poll source	Date(s) administered	Sample size	Margin of error	Glenn Anderson	John Conyers	John Goci	Shanelle Jackson	Bert Johnson	Undecided
EPIC-MRA	July 28–29, 2012	800	± 3.5%	17%	57%	4%	7%	5%	10%

==== Primary results ====
Democratic primary results
Party	Candidate	Votes	%
Democratic	John Conyers, Jr. (incumbent)	38,371	55.4
Democratic	Glenn Anderson	12,586	18.2
Democratic	Bert Johnson	6,928	10.0
Democratic	Shanelle Jackson	8,708	12.6
Democratic	John Goci	2,664	3.8
Total votes		69,257	100.0

=== Republican primary ===
==== Candidates ====
===== Nominee =====
- Harry Sawicki

==== Primary results ====
Republican primary results
Party	Candidate	Votes	%
Republican	Harry Sawicki	8,462	100.0
Total votes		8,462	100.0

=== General election ===
==== Endorsements ====
John Conyers (D)

Labor unions

- AFL-CIO
- National Association of Letter Carriers

Organizations

- National Organization for Women
- Planned Parenthood Action Fund
- Sierra Club
- Stonewall Democrats

==== Predictions ====
Source	Ranking	As of
The Cook Political Report	Safe D	November 5, 2012
Rothenberg	Safe D	November 2, 2012
Roll Call	Safe D	November 4, 2012
Sabato's Crystal Ball	Safe D	November 5, 2012
NY Times	Safe D	November 4, 2012
RCP	Safe D	November 4, 2012
The Hill	Safe D	November 4, 2012

==== Results ====
Michigan's 13th congressional district, 2012
Party	Candidate	Votes	%
Democratic	John Conyers, Jr. (incumbent)	235,336	82.8
Republican	Harry T. Sawicki	38,769	13.6
Libertarian	Chris Sharer	6,076	2.1
U.S. Taxpayers'	Martin Gray	4,089	1.5
Total votes		284,270	100.0
Democratic hold			

== District 14 ==
2012 Michigan's 14th congressional district election
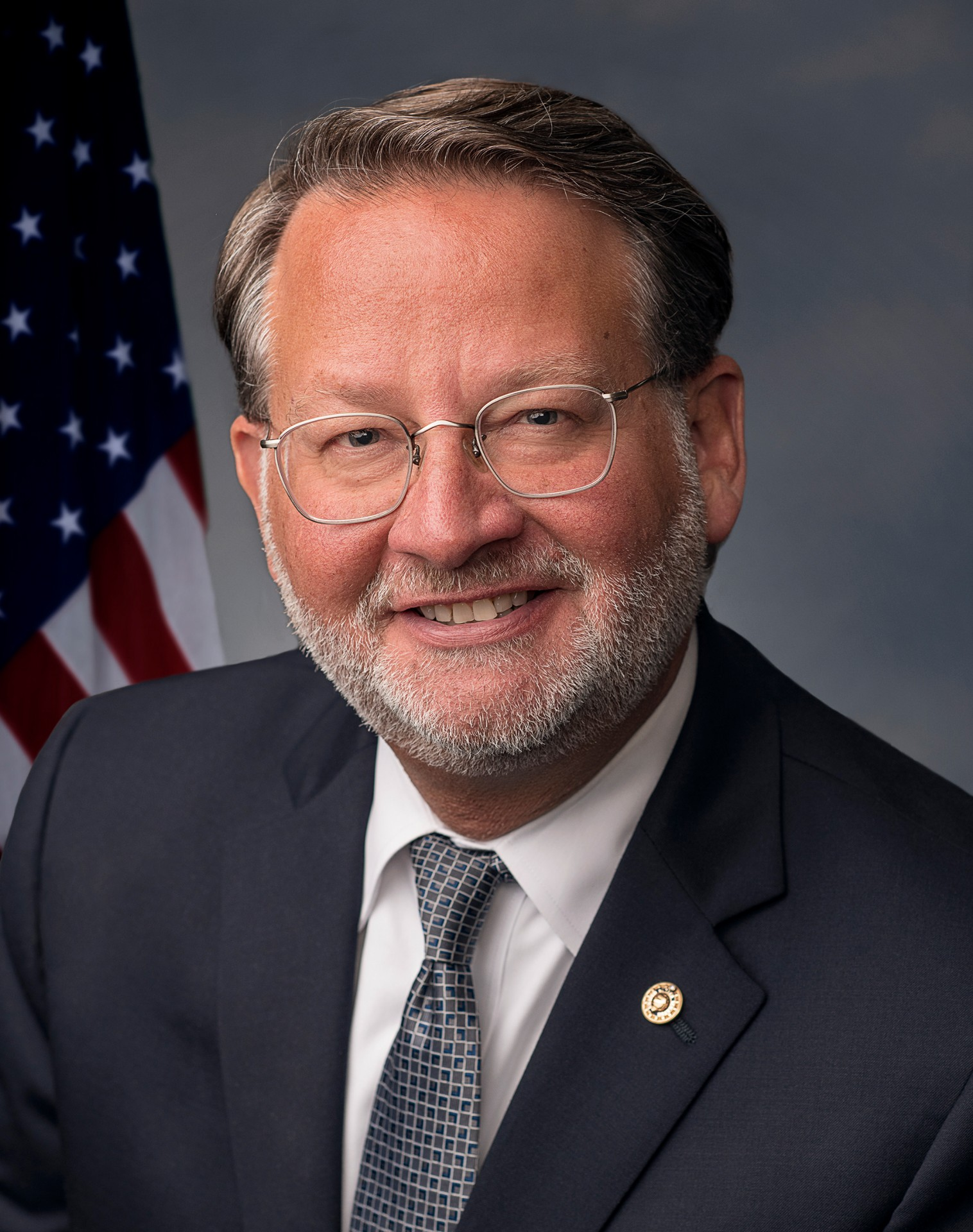

Nominee	Gary Peters	John Hauler
Party	Democratic	Republican
Popular vote	270,450	51,395
Percentage	82.3%	15.6%
- County results Peters: 70–80% 80–90%
U.S. Representative before election
Gary Peters
Democratic
Elected U.S. Representative
Gary Peters
Democratic

The new 14th district crosses the traditional boundary of the 8 Mile Road (separating Detroit from Oakland County) in order to continue to have a majority of minority voters. A large part of the district is now outside of Detroit (it comprises approximately 40 percent Detroit, 40 percent Oakland County, and 20 percent outlying Wayne County).

Leonard Schwartz, lawyer and perennial candidate from Oak Park, who most recently challenged Sandy Levin for US House District 12 in 2010, was the Libertarian nominee. Douglas Campbell, an engineer from Ferndale, was the Green Party candidate. Roll Call rated the race as "Safe Democratic".

=== Democratic primary ===
==== Candidates ====
===== Nominee =====
- Gary Peters, incumbent U.S. representative for the 9th district

===== Eliminated in primary =====
- Hansen Clarke, incumbent U.S. representative for the 13th district
- Bob Costello, magistrate for the 36th District Court
- Brenda Lawrence, mayor of Southfield and nominee for lieutenant governor in 2010
- Mary Waters, former state representative and candidate for the 13th district in 2008,

===== Declined =====
- John Conyers, incumbent U.S. representative (running in the 13th district)
- Geoffrey Feiger, attorney and nominee for governor in 1998
- Irv Lowenberg, Southfield city treasurer
- Tim Melton, state representative
- Buzz Thomas, state senator

==== Endorsements ====
Gary Peters

Labor unions

- AFL-CIO
- Service Employees International Union

==== Polling ====
Poll source	Date(s) administered	Sample size	Margin of error	Hansen Clarke	Bob Costello	Brenda Lawrence	Gary Peters	Mary Waters	Undecided
EPIC-MRA	July 28–29, 2012	800	± 3.5%	33%	1%	7%	52%	2%	5%

==== Primary results ====
Democratic primary results
Party	Candidate	Votes	%
Democratic	Gary Peters (incumbent)	41,230	47.0
Democratic	Hansen Clarke (incumbent)	30,847	35.2
Democratic	Brenda Lawrence	6,928	13.3
Democratic	Mary Waters	2,919	3.3
Democratic	Bob Costello	1,027	1.2
Total votes		87,667	100.0

=== Republican primary ===
==== Candidates ====
===== Nominee =====
- John Hauler, government contractor for ACE electronics

==== Primary results ====
Republican primary results
Party	Candidate	Votes	%
Republican	John Hauler	17,691	100.0
Total votes		17,691	100.0

=== General election ===
==== Endorsements ====
Gary Peters (D)

Labor unions

- AFL-CIO
- National Association of Letter Carriers
- Service Employees International Union

Organizations

- Equality Michigan
- National Organization for Women
- Planned Parenthood Action Fund
- Sierra Club
- Veterans' Alliance for Security and Democracy
- VoteVets

==== Predictions ====
Source	Ranking	As of
The Cook Political Report	Safe D	November 5, 2012
Rothenberg	Safe D	November 2, 2012
Roll Call	Safe D	November 4, 2012
Sabato's Crystal Ball	Safe D	November 5, 2012
NY Times	Safe D	November 4, 2012
RCP	Safe D	November 4, 2012
The Hill	Safe D	November 4, 2012

==== Results ====
Michigan's 14th congressional district, 2012
Party	Candidate	Votes	%
Democratic	Gary Peters (incumbent)	270,450	82.3
Republican	John Hauler	51,395	15.6
Libertarian	Leonard Schwartz	3,968	1.2
Green	Douglas Campbell	2,979	0.9
Total votes		328,792	100.0
Democratic hold			
