= 2012 Michigan's 11th congressional district special election =

- November 6, 2012
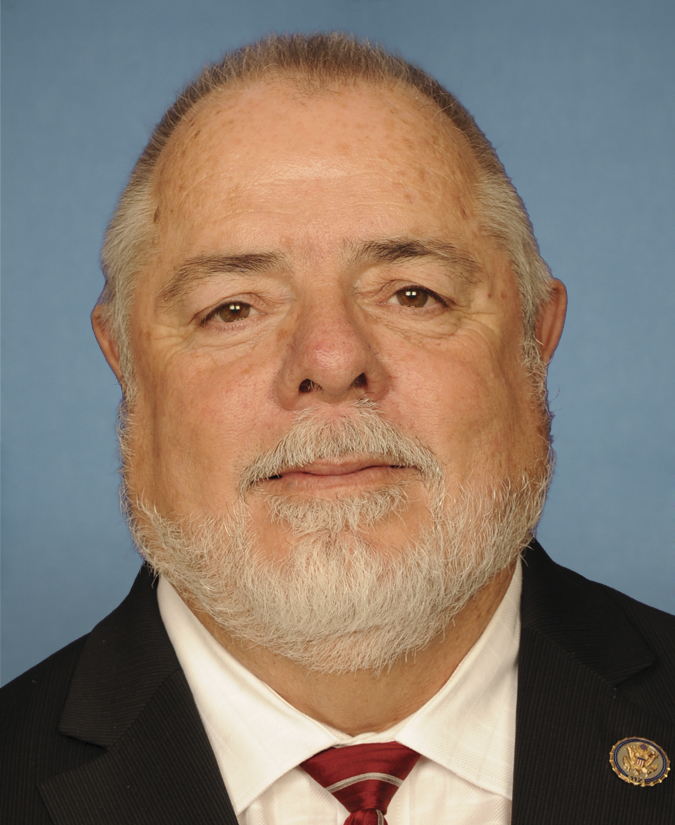

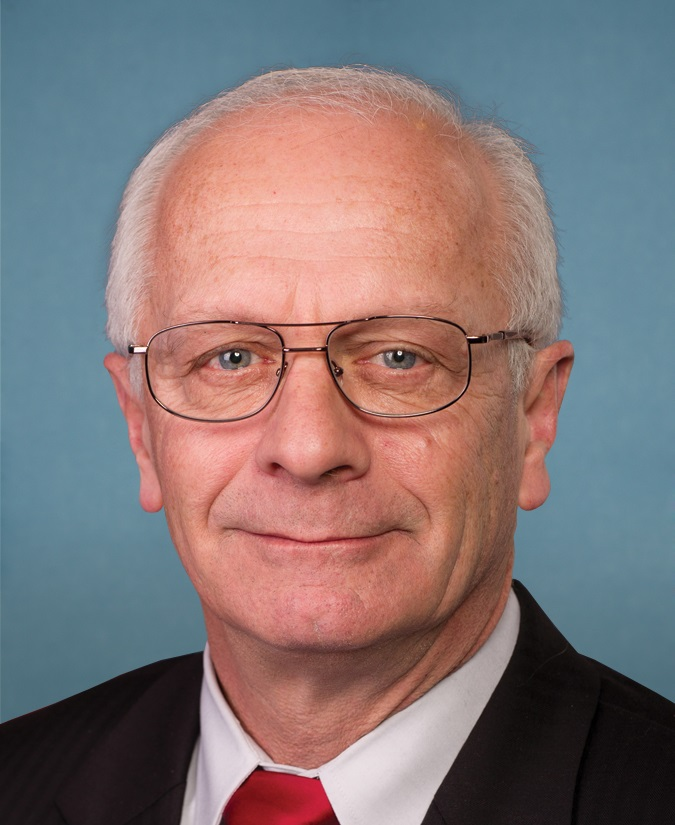
Nominee	David Curson	Kerry Bentivolio
Party	Democratic	Republican
Popular vote	159,258	151,736
Percentage	48.4%	46.1%
- Michigan's 11th congressional district at the time of the 2012 special election.
Representative before election
Thaddeus McCotter
Republican
Elected Representative
David Curson
Democratic

The 2012 special election in Michigan's 11th congressional district was a special election that took place in Michigan on November 6, 2012, to replace Republican United States Congressman Thaddeus McCotter, who resigned after a failed presidential campaign and a series of scandals. Former autoworker David Curson, the Democratic nominee, narrowly defeated Republican nominee Kerry Bentivolio, a reindeer farmer, to win the seat for the last few months of McCotter's term.

== Schedule ==
As a matter of convenience and cost saving, this special election was held in conjunction with the regularly scheduled general election on November 6, 2012. Voters were asked on the November ballot to select two candidates: one to serve the remainder of McCotter's term in the 112th Congress, and the other to serve the full 2-year term in the 113th Congress beginning in January 2013.

== Democratic primary ==
=== Candidates ===
- David Curson, labor activist

Despite the fact that Canton Township Trustee Syed Taj was the Democratic nominee in the regularly scheduled general election, Taj did not opt to run in the special election and Curson did not opt to run in the general election.

=== Results ===
Democratic primary results
Party	Candidate	Votes	%
Democratic	David Curson	11,450	100.00
Total votes		11,450	100.00

== Republican primary ==
=== Candidates ===
- Kerry Bentivolio, reindeer farmer
- Nancy Cassis, former State Senator
- Kenneth Crider, steel worker
- Carolyn Kavanagh
- Steve King, former member of the Livonia School Board

=== Results ===
Republican primary results
Party	Candidate	Votes	%
Republican	Kerry Bentivolio	10,280	41.69
Republican	Nancy Cassis	8,803	35.70
Republican	Carolyn Kavanagh	2,653	10.76
Republican	Steve King	1,715	6.95
Republican	Kenneth Crider	1,208	4.90
Total votes		24,659	100.00

== General election ==
The election to fill the remaining 6 weeks of McCotter's term was largely ignored as the attention was focused on the presidential election and the race for the full two-year term between Bentivolio and Taj.

=== Candidates ===
- Kerry Bentivolio, Republican nominee
- David Curson, Democratic nominee
- John J. Tartar, Libertarian Party nominee
- Marc J. Sosnowski, Constitution Party nominee

=== Results ===
Michigan's 11th congressional district special election, 2012
Party	Candidate	Votes	%
Democratic	David Curson	159,258	48.39
Republican	Kerry Bentivolio	151,736	46.10
Libertarian	John Tatar	11,606	3.53
U.S. Taxpayers	Marc Sosnowski	6,529	1.98
Total votes		329,137	100.00
Democratic gain from Republican			

==== By county ====
County	David Curson Democratic		Kerry Bentivolio Republican		Various candidates Other parties		Margin		Total
County	#	%	#	%	#	%	#	%	Total
Oakland (part)	59,161	56.43%	40,423	38.56%	5,255	5.01%	-18,738	-17.87%	104,839
Wayne (part)	92,575	41.27%	118,835	52.98%	12,888	5.75%	91,740	11.71%	224,298
Totals	159,258	48.39%	151,736	46.10%	18,135	5.51%	7,522	2.29%	329,137

== See also ==
- List of special elections to the United States House of Representatives
- Michigan's 11th congressional district
