= Michigan's 11th congressional district =

U.S. House district for Michigan

Coordinates: 42°31′48″N 83°27′14″W

- Interactive map of district boundaries since January 3, 2023
- Representative: Haley Stevens; D–Birmingham
- Population (2025): 775,090
- Median household income: $96,768
- Ethnicity: 68.3% White; 12.9% Black; 8.7% Asian; 5.3% Hispanic; 4.1% Two or more races; 0.6% other
- Cook PVI: D+9

Michigan's 11th congressional district is a United States congressional district north of Detroit, comprising most of urbanized central Oakland County. Until 1993, the district covered the state's Upper Peninsula and the northernmost portion of the Lower Peninsula (a.k.a. Northern Michigan). In redistricting that year, it was shifted to the outer Detroit area. Its former geographical area is now the state's first district. Its current configuration dates from 2023. It is the wealthiest congressional district in Michigan and the 104th wealthiest in the United States, with 16.5 percent of households earning over $200,000, per a 2024 study.

The 11th district was represented by Thad McCotter from 2003 until his resignation on July 6, 2012. He was replaced by Democrat David Curson, who won a special election on November 6, 2012. Curson was sworn in on November 13. He was replaced by Kerry Bentivolio in January 2013, who had been elected in the regular fall election in 2012. David Trott was elected in 2014 after defeating Bentivolio in the Republican primary, and took office in January 2015. He did not seek reelection in 2018. Democrat Haley Stevens was elected on November 6, 2018, and is the current representative for the eleventh district. She will be succeeded by Jeremy Moss in January 2027.

== History ==
The 11th congressional district formed in 1993 was given portions of the old 15th (mainly Westland), 2nd (Livonia), 17th (the included portion of Southfield), 6th (Highland and White Lake Townships), and 18th congressional districts. Most of its territory came from the old 18th congressional district.

In 2003, the district was essentially split in two. The bulk of the district–most of the Oakland County portion–became the 9th district, while a new 11th was created mostly out of the Wayne County portion of the old 11th, combined with a sliver of Oakland.

In 2023, the district was consolidated to include only the urbanized south-central section of Oakland County. The area that the 11th now covers has historically been strongly Republican. In the 1990s it became a swing district, with a slight Republican lean. Since the 2010s, the district is now considered to lean Democratic.

== Counties and municipalities ==
For the 118th and successive Congresses (based on redistricting following the 2020 census), the district contains all or portions of the following counties and municipalities:

Oakland County (30)

Auburn Hills, Berkley, Birmingham, Bloomfield Hills, Bloomfield Township, Clawson, Commerce Charter Township, Novi (part; also 6th), Farmington, Farmington Hills, Ferndale, Hazel Park, Huntington Woods, Keego Harbor, Lake Angelus, Madison Heights, Oak Park, Orchard Lake Village, Pleasant Ridge, Pontiac, Royal Oak, Royal Oak Charter Township, Sylvan Lake, Troy, Walled Lake, Waterford Charter Township, West Bloomfield Charter Township, White Lake Charter Township (part; also 9th), Wolverine Lake, Wixom

== Recent election results from statewide races ==
Year	Office	Results
2008	President	Obama 59% - 40%
2012	President	Obama 56% - 43%
2014	Senate	Peters 58% - 38%
2014	Governor	Snyder 54% - 44%
2014	Secretary of State	Johnson 56% - 41%
2014	Attorney General	Schuette 50% - 47%
2016	President	Clinton 55% - 41%
2018	Senate	Stabenow 59% - 39%
2018	Governor	Whitmer 60% - 37%
2018	Attorney General	Nessel 57% - 39%
2020	President	Biden 59% - 39%
2020	Senate	Peters 58% - 41%
2022	Governor	Whitmer 64% - 35%
2022	Secretary of State	Benson 66% - 32%
2022	Attorney General	Nessel 63% - 35%
2024	President	Harris 57% - 41%
2024	Senate	Slotkin 57% - 40%

== List of members representing the district ==
Member	Party	Years	Cong ress	Electoral history
District created March 4, 1883
Edward Breitung (Negaunee)	Republican	March 4, 1883 – March 3, 1885	48th	Elected in 1882. Retired.
Seth C. Moffatt (Traverse City)	Republican	March 4, 1885 – December 22, 1887	49th 50th	Elected in 1884. Re-elected in 1886. Died.
Vacant		December 22, 1887 – February 14, 1888	50th	
Henry W. Seymour (Sault Ste. Marie)	Republican	February 14, 1888 – March 3, 1889	50th	Elected to finish Moffatt's term. Lost renomination.
Samuel M. Stephenson (Menominee)	Republican	March 4, 1889 – March 3, 1893	51st 52nd	Elected in 1888. Re-elected in 1890. Redistricted to the 12th district.
John Avery (Greenville)	Republican	March 4, 1893 – March 3, 1897	53rd 54th	Elected in 1892. Re-elected in 1894. Retired.
William S. Mesick (Mancelona)	Republican	March 4, 1897 – March 3, 1901	55th 56th	Elected in 1896. Re-elected in 1898. Lost renomination.
Archibald B. Darragh (St. Louis)	Republican	March 4, 1901 – March 3, 1909	57th 58th 59th 60th	Elected in 1900. Re-elected in 1902. Re-elected in 1904. Re-elected in 1906. Retired.
Francis H. Dodds (Mount Pleasant)	Republican	March 4, 1909 – March 3, 1913	61st 62nd	Elected in 1908. Re-elected in 1910. Lost renomination.
Francis O. Lindquist (Greenville)	Republican	March 4, 1913 – March 3, 1915	63rd	Elected in 1912. Retired.
Frank D. Scott (Alpena)	Republican	March 4, 1915 – March 3, 1927	64th 65th 66th 67th 68th 69th	Elected in 1914. Re-elected in 1916. Re-elected in 1918. Re-elected in 1920. Re-elected in 1922. Re-elected in 1924. Lost renomination.
Frank P. Bohn (Newberry)	Republican	March 4, 1927 – March 3, 1933	70th 71st 72nd	Elected in 1926. Re-elected in 1928. Re-elected in 1930. Lost re-election.
Prentiss M. Brown (St. Ignace)	Democratic	March 4, 1933 – November 18, 1936	73rd 74th	Elected in 1932. Re-elected in 1934. Resigned when elected U.S. Senator.
Vacant		November 18, 1936 – January 3, 1937	74th	
John F. Luecke (Escanaba)	Democratic	January 3, 1937 – January 3, 1939	75th	Elected in 1936. Lost re-election.
Fred Bradley (Rogers City)	Republican	January 3, 1939 – May 24, 1947	76th 77th 78th 79th 80th	Elected in 1938. Re-elected in 1940. Re-elected in 1942. Re-elected in 1944. Re-elected in 1946. Died.
Vacant		May 24, 1947 – August 26, 1947	80th	
Charles E. Potter (Cheboygan)	Republican	August 26, 1947 – November 4, 1952	80th 81st 82nd	Elected to finish Bradley's term. Re-elected in 1948. Re-elected in 1950. Resigned when elected U.S. Senator.
Vacant		November 4, 1952 – January 3, 1953	82nd	
Victor A. Knox (Sault Ste. Marie)	Republican	January 3, 1953 – January 3, 1965	83rd 84th 85th 86th 87th 88th	Elected in 1952. Re-elected in 1954. Re-elected in 1956. Re-elected in 1958. Re-elected in 1960. Re-elected in 1962. Lost re-election.
Raymond F. Clevenger (Sault Ste. Marie)	Democratic	January 3, 1965 – January 3, 1967	89th	Elected in 1964. Lost re-election.
Philip Ruppe (Houghton)	Republican	January 3, 1967 – January 3, 1979	90th 91st 92nd 93rd 94th 95th	Elected in 1966. Re-elected in 1968. Re-elected in 1970. Re-elected in 1972. Re-elected in 1974. Re-elected in 1976. Retired.
Robert W. Davis (Gaylord)	Republican	January 3, 1979 – January 3, 1993	96th 97th 98th 99th 100th 101st 102nd	Elected in 1978. Re-elected in 1980. Re-elected in 1982. Re-elected in 1984. Re-elected in 1986. Re-elected in 1988. Re-elected in 1990. Retired.
Joe Knollenberg (Bloomfield)	Republican	January 3, 1993 – January 3, 2003	103rd 104th 105th 106th 107th	Elected in 1992. Re-elected in 1994. Re-elected in 1996. Re-elected in 1998. Re-elected in 2000. Redistricted to the 9th district.
Thad McCotter (Livonia)	Republican	January 3, 2003 – July 6, 2012	108th 109th 110th 111th 112th	Elected in 2002. Re-elected in 2004. Re-elected in 2006. Re-elected in 2008. Re-elected in 2010. Failed to qualify for renomination then resigned. (Note: McCotter had sought the nomination for Republican nomination for president, but dropped out following the Iowa Straw Poll. He then tried to qualify for the primary, however fewer than 1,000 signatures were declared valid, meaning he did not qualify to appear on the primary ballot.)
Vacant		July 6, 2012 – November 13, 2012	112th	
David Curson (Belleville)	Democratic	November 13, 2012 – January 3, 2013	112th	Elected to finish McCotter's term. Retired.
Kerry Bentivolio (Milford)	Republican	January 3, 2013 – January 3, 2015	113th	Elected in 2012. Lost renomination.
Dave Trott (Birmingham)	Republican	January 3, 2015 – January 3, 2019	114th 115th	Elected in 2014. Re-elected in 2016. Retired.
Haley Stevens (Birmingham)	Democratic	January 3, 2019 – present	116th 117th 118th 119th	Elected in 2018. Re-elected in 2020. Re-elected in 2022. Re-elected in 2024. Retired to run for U.S. Senate.
Jeremy Moss (Southfield)	Democratic	Assuming office on January 3, 2027		Elected in 2026.

== Recent election results ==
=== 2012 ===
Michigan's 11th congressional district, 2012 special
Party	Candidate	Votes	%
Democratic	David Curson	159,258	48.4
Republican	Kerry Bentivolio	151,736	46.1
Libertarian	John Tatar	11,606	3.5
Green	Marc Sosnowski	6,529	2.0
n/a	Write-ins	8	0.0
Total votes		329,137	100.0
Democratic gain from Republican			

Michigan's 11th congressional district, 2012
Party	Candidate	Votes	%
Republican	Kerry Bentivolio	181,788	50.8
Democratic	Syed Taj	158,879	44.4
Libertarian	John Tatar	9,637	2.7
Green	Steven Paul Duke	4,569	1.3
Natural Law	Daniel Johnson	3,251	0.9
n/a	Write-ins	15	0.0
Total votes		358,139	100.0
Republican gain from Democratic			

=== 2014 ===
Michigan's 11th congressional district, 2014
Party	Candidate	Votes	%
Republican	Dave Trott	140,435	55.9
Democratic	Bobby McKenzie	101,681	40.5
Libertarian	John Tatar	7,711	3.0
Republican	Kerry Bentivolio (incumbent) (write-in)	1,411	0.6
Total votes		251,238	100.0
Republican hold			

=== 2016 ===
Michigan's 11th congressional district, 2016
Party	Candidate	Votes	%
Republican	Dave Trott (incumbent)	200,872	52.9
Democratic	Anil Kumar	152,461	40.2
Independent Politician	Kerry Bentivolio	16,610	4.4
Libertarian	Jonathan Ray Osment	9,545	2.5
Total votes		379,488	100.0
Republican hold			

=== 2018 ===
Michigan's 11th congressional district, 2018
Party	Candidate	Votes	%
Democratic	Haley Stevens	181,912	51.8
Republican	Lena Epstein	158,463	45.2
Libertarian	Leonard Schwartz	5,799	1.7
Independent	Cooper Nye	4,727	1.3
Total votes		350,901	100.0
Democratic gain from Republican			

=== 2020 ===
Michigan's 11th congressional district, 2020
Party	Candidate	Votes	%
Democratic	Haley Stevens (incumbent)	226,128	50.2
Republican	Eric Esshaki	215,405	47.8
Libertarian	Leonard Schwartz	8,936	2.0
Independent	Frank Acosta (write-in)	4	0.0
Total votes		450,473	100.0
Democratic hold			

=== 2022 ===
Michigan's 11th congressional district, 2022
Party	Candidate	Votes	%
Democratic	Haley Stevens (incumbent)	224,537	61.3
Republican	Mark Ambrose	141,642	38.6
Total votes		366,179	100.0
Democratic hold			

=== 2024 ===
Michigan's 11th congressional district, 2024
Party	Candidate	Votes	%
Democratic	Haley Stevens (incumbent)	260,780	58.2
Republican	Nick Somberg	177,432	39.6
Green	Douglas Campbell	9,713	2.2
Total votes		447,925	100.0
Democratic hold			

== Historical district boundaries ==
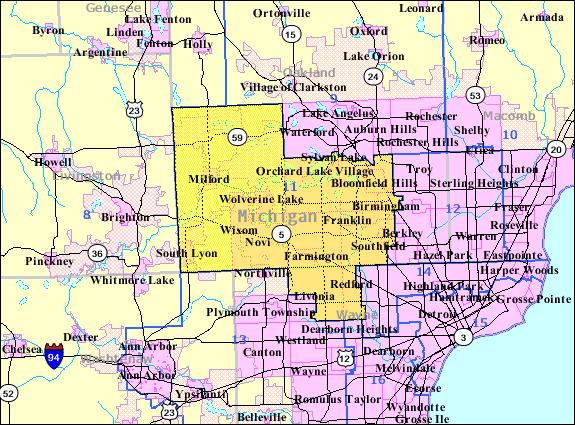
1993–2003

2003–2013

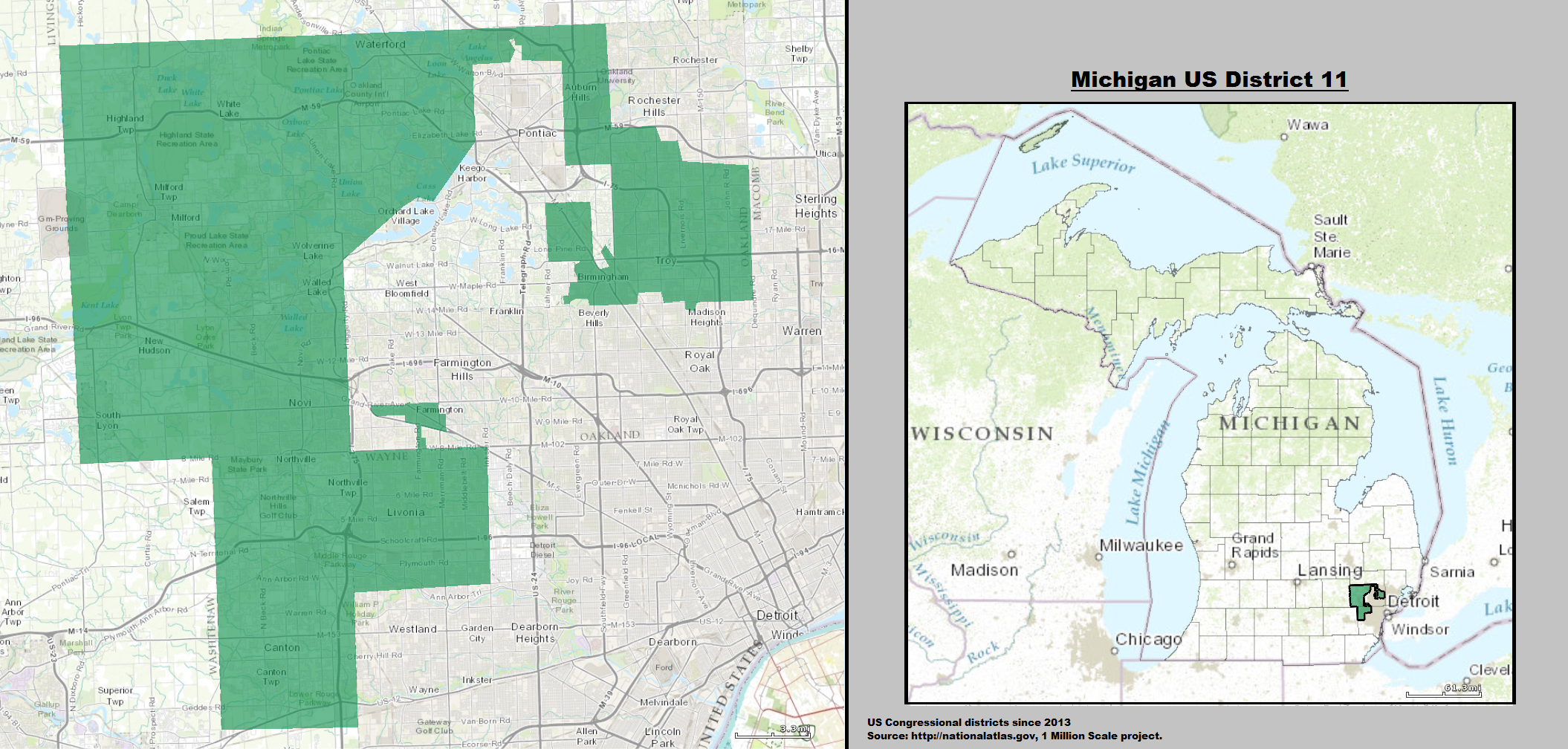
2013–2023

== See also ==
- Michigan's congressional districts
- List of United States congressional districts
