= Kerry Bentivolio =

American politician (born 1951)

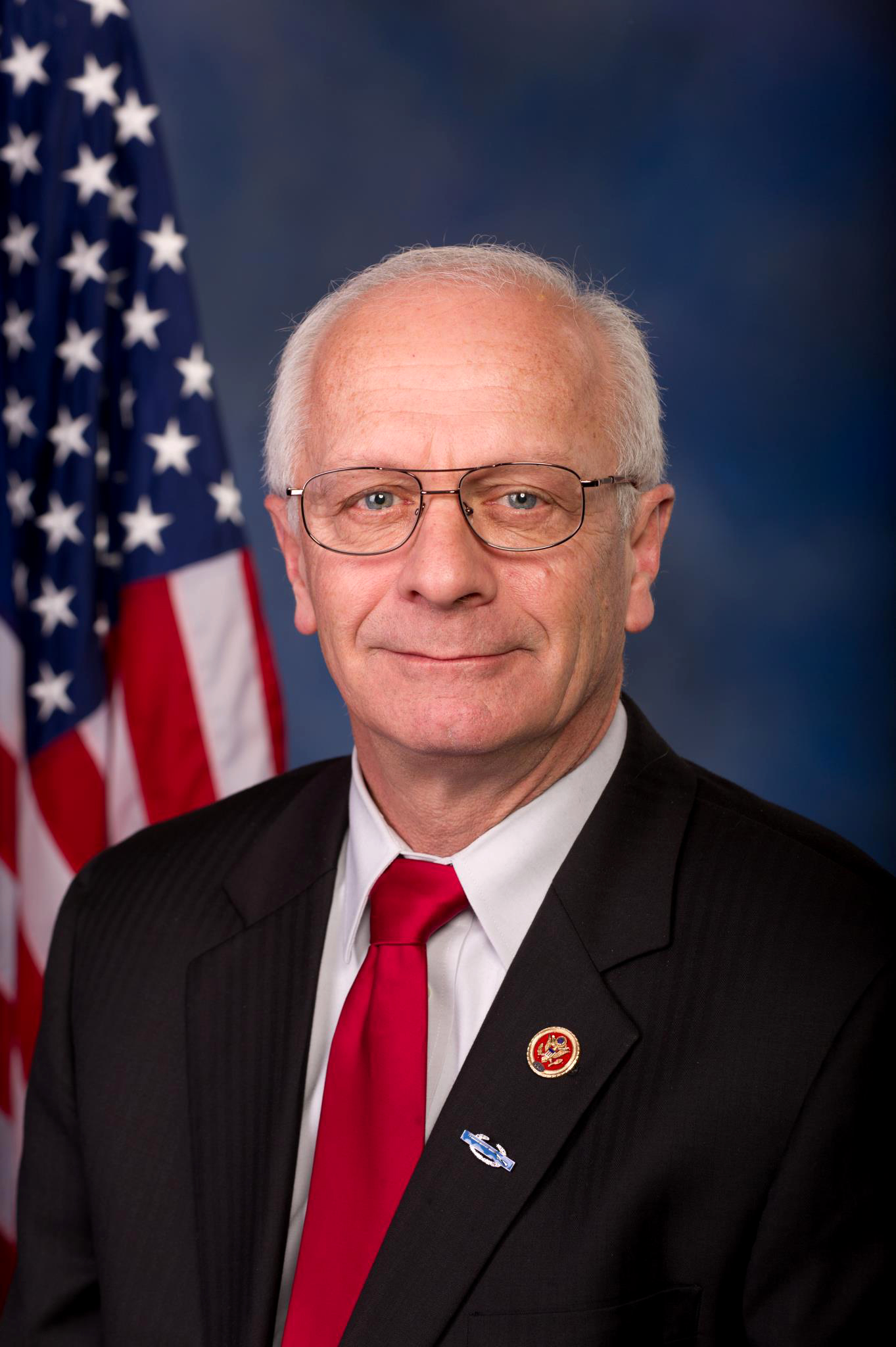

Member of the U.S. House of Representatives from Michigan's 11th district
- In office January 3, 2013 – January 3, 2015
- Preceded by: David Curson
- Succeeded by: Dave Trott

Personal details
- Born: Kerry Lynn Bentivolio; October 6, 1951 (age 74) Detroit, Michigan, U.S.
- Party: Republican (before 2016, 2018–present); Libertarian (2016); Independent (2016–2018)
- Spouse: Karen Bentivolio
- Education: Oakland Community College; Michigan State University; St. Mary's College (BA); Marygrove College (MEd)
- Website: House website (archived)

Military service
- Branch/service: United States Army
- Years of service: 1970–2008
- Rank: Sergeant First Class
- Unit: Michigan Army National Guard
- Battles/wars: Vietnam War; Operation Iraqi Freedom
- Awards: Meritorious Service Medal; Army Commendation Medal (2); Army Achievement Medal (4); Air Force Achievement Medal; Army Good Conduct; National Defense Service Medal (3); Vietnam Service Medal (with 2 Bronze Service Stars); Overseas Service Ribbon (3); Armed Forces Reserve Medal (with Mobilization and 20 years devices); Gallantry Cross (with Palm); Vietnam Campaign Medal

Kerry Lynn Bentivolio (born October 6, 1951) is an American politician and educator who served as the United States representative for Michigan's 11th congressional district from 2013 to 2015. He is a member of the Republican Party.

Bentivolio was first elected to Congress in 2012. In 2014 he lost renomination in the Republican primary to attorney David Trott, after which he launched an unsuccessful write-in campaign. He later unsuccessfully sought the Republican nomination for the same seat in 2018 and 2020.

Bentivolio worked as a designer in the automotive industry for twenty years, followed by teaching for fifteen years in schools and institutions. He is an Army veteran who served in the Vietnam War, the Gulf War, and the Iraq War.

== Early life and education ==
Bentivolio was born in Detroit, Michigan in 1951. Bentivolio was raised in the Detroit area with four brothers. His father, a factory worker, served in World War II, while his grandfather served in World War I. He attended Oakland Community College from 1971 to 1983 where he earned an associate degree in liberal arts, before transferring to Michigan State University in East Lansing to attend further courses in 1975 where he met his future wife, Karen. He received his Bachelor of Arts in Social Science from Saint Mary's College in Michigan in 1999. Later, he earned a master's degree in Education from Marygrove College in 2001.

== Military service ==
Bentivolio enlisted in the United States Army in November 1968 and served in South Vietnam from 1970 to 1971 as an infantry rifleman. After a break in service, he later joined the Army National Guard in Michigan as a reservist and served for more than 20 years. Bentivolio was trained as an MLRS/HIMARS crewmember. He was deployed to Iraq in 2007 with an Artillery unit as a senior human resources sergeant performing combat convoy missions. He retired as a sergeant first class after a neck injury in 2008. Bentivolio's awards include the Meritorious Service Medal, Army Commendation Medal, Army Achievement Medal, and the Combat Infantryman Badge.

== Civilian career ==
Bentiviolio has worked as an autoworker, reindeer rancher, automotive designer, teacher, commercial home builder, Santa Claus for hire, and amateur actor before running for political office. He taught in private schools, public schools, and adult-education institutions.

Bentivolio said that he took up acting in movies to get rid of his stage fright in front of cameras. In 2010, he acted in the low-budget movie Lucy's Law in the role of a TV News reporter. In 2011, he appeared in another low-budget political satire, The President Goes to Heaven.

== Political career ==
=== 2010 state senate election ===
In 2010, Bentivolio ran for the Michigan Senate for the 15th District but was defeated by Mike Kowall in the primary. During the election, Bentivolio acknowledged that he had filed for bankruptcy in 1992 after homes he had built as a commercial builder did not sell, and Bentivolio faced judgments from creditor's collection suits in the Michigan counties of Oakland and Livingston. Bentivolio also acknowledged having been involved in a lawsuit involving one of the creditors to whom he had owed money at that time; Bentivolio had started a new business doing Santa Claus appearances, and had obtained an appearance at the White House during the presidency of George H. W. Bush. Bentivolio called a news conference in Milford, whereupon the creditor complained and newspapers reported on the bankruptcy story. Bentivolio sued the vendor and several newspapers for slander and libel. He won the case against his for slander and libel and was awarded $100,000. The Free Press newspaper settled out of court.

=== 2012 congressional elections ===
In 2011, Bentivolio announced his candidacy for Michigan's 11th congressional district seat in the U.S. House of Representatives and was considered a long-shot to defeat incumbent Thaddeus McCotter for the Republican nomination. However, Bentivolio's campaign was aided by reports that McCotter failed to qualify for the primary after failing to turn in enough valid petition signatures to qualify for the ballot. McCotter's campaign released a statement on May 25, 2012, conceding that there were not enough valid signatures turned in with his ballot petition.

Although McCotter initially announced he would mount a write-in campaign for the seat, he opted to retire at the end of his term. However, McCotter unexpectedly resigned on July 6, 2012, causing a scramble for the vacant nomination. Bentivolio faced former state senator Nancy Cassis, a write-in candidate, for the district's Republican primary. Cassis and her supporters drew attention to the 2011 film The President Goes to Heaven in which Bentivolio had a prominent role as a doctor tending to a fictional president resembling George W. Bush. In the movie, a fictional president instigates the September 11, 2001 attacks in a plot to justify the invasion of Iraq, but cannot get to heaven until he converts to Islam. Bentivolio pointed out the film was a work of fiction. On August 7, 2012, Bentivolio defeated Cassis and won the district's Republican nomination, pitting him against Democratic nominee Syed Taj, a physician, in the November 6, 2012 election.

In August 2012, news reports stated that Bentivolio had been reprimanded for threatening students at Fowlerville High School. Bentivolio said the allegations were false and politically motivated. On November 1, 2012, five days before the general election, Phillip Bentivolio of Little Rock, Arkansas, the estranged brother of Bentivolio, told the Michigan Information and Research Service (MIRS) that his brother owed him $20,000 for houses they built together in Arkansas 20 years earlier. Phillip also accused his brother of being "mentally imbalanced" and "dishonest". Bentivolio responded by telling MIRS that his brother called for the first time in 20 years and threatened to go to the press if Bentivolio didn't pay him $20,000. He said he became worried about Phillip's mental state and reported him to the Little Rock Police Department, which confirmed that officers visited and checked on Phillip's condition.

On November 6, 2012, Bentivolio lost the special election for the remaining months of McCotter's term in 112th Congress to David Curson, but won the general election and became representative-elect for the 11th Congressional District.

=== 2014 congressional election ===
Bentivolio faced an August 5, 2014, Republican primary challenge for the Michigan's 11th congressional district seat from lawyer David Trott who announced his bid on September 4, 2013. He was defeated by Trott in the primary, making him the third incumbent defeated in a Republican primary in 2014. He served out the rest of his term. However, Bentivolio mounted what The Hill described as a lackluster write-in campaign for the November 2014 election to continue serving in his seat.

Bentivolio finished the general election behind Trott, Democratic challenger, Bobby McKenzie, and Libertarian candidate John Tatar, and relinquished his seat in January.

A May 20–22 poll of likely Republican primary voters run by Target Insyght and commissioned by MIRS (Michigan Information & Research Service, Inc.) showed Rep. Bentivolio leading Trott 33% to 21%. The poll also showed a significant unfavorability rating for Trott among the Republicans surveyed.

A July 12–13 poll commissioned by the Detroit Free Press and WXYZ-TV indicated that Bentivolio's support had dropped considerably in the face of a strong media barrage from the Trott campaign; Trott led in the poll of likely Republican primary voters 53%–31%, with 16% undecided.

In the Republican primary, Trott defeated Bentivolio by 42,008 votes (66.4%) to 21,254 (33.6%).

After his defeat, Bentivolio announced that he was running a write-in campaign. He alleged that after Trott won the primary, the Trott campaign "kept up the attacks, but they expanded it beyond me. After they won the race, they continued to beat up me, my family members, as well as my staff... I put them on notice: If they didn't stop I'm probably going to end up doing a write-in campaign. And they didn't stop." The Trott campaign has denied this, saying that "nothing like that occurred." Bentivolio does not think he will win, or even "get enough votes to keep [Trott] from getting elected... all I'm concerned about is getting people who want a voice through a protest vote to do a protest vote."

=== 2016 congressional election ===
Bentivolio originally sought to run for Congress in 2016 as a Republican again, however he abandoned these plans and launched a short lived bid to seek the Libertarian nomination for vice president. Former Massachusetts Governor William Weld would ultimately receive the Libertarian nomination. On July 21, 2016, Bentivolio announced he would seek a re-match with Trott in the 11th District, this time attempting to do so as an independent. Bentivolio submitted more than the minimum 3,000 signatures that are required to gain a spot on the November general election ballot as a non-party affiliated candidate and was placed on the ballot.

=== 2018 congressional election ===
After David Trott retired, Bentivolio again filed to run in the eleventh district Republican primary. He was challenged by businesswoman and Michigan co-chair of Donald Trump's 2016 presidential campaign Lena Epstein, State Representative Klint Kesto, State Senator Mike Kowall and former State Senator, nominee for US Senate in 2002 and nominee for the ninth district in 2010 Rocky Raczkowski. Throughout the campaign, Bentivolio polled behind most candidates, and on election day Bentivolio finished last in the primary, drawing 9,799 votes, or 11.3%. Epstein won the nomination in a race ultimately won by Democrat Haley Stevens.

=== 2020 congressional election ===
After the seat was flipped into Democratic hands by Haley Stevens, Bentivolio again filed to run in the Republican primary. He faced four other candidates, plus an official write-in candidate: attorney Eric Esshaki, entrepreneur Carmelita Greco, auto show product specialist and former model Whitney Williams, and businessman Frank Acosta. Bentivolio would finish third in the primary with 18,794 votes, or 21.6%, behind Greco's 22.9% and Esshaki's 31.0%. Esshaki would be defeated by Stevens in the general election.

=== 2022 congressional election ===
In 2022, Bentivolio once again ran for Michigan's 11th congressional district in the Republican primary. However, due to redistricting, the 11th district became a Democratic stronghold, prompting Bentivolio to instead run in the newly drawn 10th congressional district. He faced several opponents in the Republican primary, including John James, a businessman and former U.S. Senate candidate. Bentivolio finished fourth in the primary, with James securing the nomination and eventually winning the general election.

=== 2024 congressional election ===
Bentivolio announced his candidacy for the U.S. House of Representatives in Michigan's 5th congressional district for the 2024 election. He is running as a Republican and faces several primary challengers. His campaign has emphasized his experience in Congress and his conservative stance on various issues.

== Recent activities ==
Since leaving Congress, Bentivolio has remained active in conservative political circles. He has frequently commented on election integrity and government policies, making appearances at various political events. He has also continued his work as an educator and public speaker.

=== Political positions ===
Bentivolio describes himself as a conservative with libertarian ideals on most issues and has been endorsed by the Tea Party Express. He strongly supports the right to bear arms.

He describes freedom of speech as "vital to our society." According to his campaign website, he opposes "any measures to regulate speech on the Internet, or to license and regulate the behavior of Internet service providers."

According to Young Americans for Liberty, he supports a non-interventionist foreign policy.

According to Electful.com, Bentivolio supports criminalization of abortion. Bentivolio's campaign website says that he opposes federal subsidies for abortion providers, foreign aid that "supports abortion in other nations" and requirements that religious institutions provide coverage for abortion as part of federally mandated health plans. Bentivolio's website also notes that he is endorsed by the anti-abortion group Right to Life Michigan.

He seeks to reduce regulation and bureaucracy, cut taxes, cut government spending, and discontinue government investment in some industries.

In response to a request from a concerned citizen in his district, Bentivolio promised to hold a hearing concerning the "chemtrails" conspiracy theory.

In a video published on August 23, 2013, from a town hall meeting in his district, Bentivolio said it would be a "dream come true" to submit a bill with articles of impeachment for President Barack Obama. Bentivolio admitted to not having any outright evidence and instead requesting the advice of "lawyers, [with] PhDs in history" to "Tell me how I can impeach the president of the United States."

During the United States federal government shutdown of 2013, Bentivolio was one of the 144 House Republicans who voted against legislation to end the government shutdown. In explaining his vote, he said that the new health care mandate should be delayed for individuals as it was for businesses.

== U.S. House of Representatives ==
Bentivolio's two-year term began on January 3, 2013.

=== Legislation ===
As a Representative, Bentivolio sponsored 13 bills, including:

- H.R. 746, a bill to grant businesses a 6-month grace period before being subject to any government sanction or penalty, introduced February 15, 2013
- H.R. 939, a bill to prohibit the transfer of certain military equipment to the Egyptian government unless the Egyptian government combats terrorist groups, promotes religious and political freedoms, enforces access along the Sinai Peninsula, and is fully implementing the Egypt–Israel peace treaty, introduced March 4, 2013
- H.R. 1831, a bill to require bills and resolutions to contain a provision citing congressional authority, and to bar any vote from occurring if the full text of the bill or resolution has not been released publicly for at least a week, introduced May 6, 2013
- H.R. 3993, a bill to reduce the pay of members of Congress by 15% during any fiscal year in which the federal government has a budget deficit, introduced February 5, 2014
- H.R. 5121, a bill to prohibit U.S. Armed Forces from detaining a U.S. citizen or lawful resident alien of the United States who was captured, detained, or arrested in the United States, and to prohibit an authorization for the detention without charge or trial of a citizen or lawful permanent resident of the United States apprehended in the United States, introduced July 16, 2014
- H.R. 5479, a bill to require the public release of any method used to determine credit scores, introduced September 16, 2014
- H.R. 5779, a bill to allow for a $10,000 deduction in gross income each taxable year for certain expenses relating to attending a private school, introduced December 2, 2014

=== Committee assignments ===
- Committee on Oversight and Government Reform
  - Subcommittee on National Security
  - Subcommittee on Economic Growth, Job Creation and Regulatory Affairs
- Committee on Small Business
  - Subcommittee on Contracting and Workforce
  - Subcommittee on Investigations, Oversight and Regulations

== Personal life ==
Bentivolio's wife Karen is a registered nurse. They have resided in Milford, Michigan since 1982 and live on a small farm raising reindeer trained to pull Santa's sleigh in various parades and special holiday events within Michigan. They also maintain a small flock of chickens, a 25-hive apiary of honeybees, and a 115-vine vineyard. Bentivolio is an avid sportsman and bass fisherman. He is a novice golfer and enjoys clay pigeon shooting. He is a Roman Catholic.

== Filmography ==
Film
Year	Title	Role
1978	The Betsy	Extra
1989	84C MoPic'	Viet Cong Soldier
2011	Lucy's Law	Reporter
2011	The President Goes to Heaven	Chief Physician

== Electoral history ==
=== 2010 ===
Michigan state Senate 15th District Election 2010, Republican Primary
Party	Candidate	Votes	%	±%
Republican	Mike Kowall	16,816	53.2	N/A
Republican	Kerry Bentivolio	4,971	15.7	N/A
Republican	Paul Graves	3,554	11.3	N/A
Republican	Alan Stephens	2,881	9.1	N/A
Republican	Steven Valentini	2,045	6.5	N/A
Republican	John Cyrus Mohyi	1,318	4.2	N/A
Majority		11,845	37.5	−6.5
Turnout		31,585		+11.1%

=== 2012 ===
Michigan's 11th Congressional District Special election, 2012 – Republican Primary
Party	Candidate	Votes	%	±%
Republican	Kerry Bentivolio	10,280	41.7	N/A
Republican	Nancy Cassis	8,803	35.7	N/A
Republican	Carolyn Kavanagh	2,653	10.8	N/A
Republican	Nancy Crider	1,208	4.9	N/A
Republican	Steve King	1,715	7.0	N/A
Majority		1,477	6.3	N/A
Turnout		24,659		N/A

Michigan's 11th Congressional District election, 2012 – Republican Primary
Party	Candidate	Votes	%	±%
Republican	Kerry Bentivolio	42,470	65.5	N/A
Republican	Nancy Cassis (write-in)	21,436	33.5	N/A
Republican	Other Write-in	21,436	nil	N/A
Majority		21,034	32.8	−67.2
Turnout		64,081		−2.4

Michigan's 11th Congressional District Special election, 2012
Party	Candidate	Votes	%	±%
Democratic	David Curson	159,258	48.4	N/A
Republican	Kerry Bentivolio	151,736	46.1	N/A
Libertarian	John J. Tatar	11,606	3.5	N/A
Constitution	Marc J. Sosnowski	6,529	2.0	N/A
Majority		7,522	2.1	N/A
Turnout		329,137		N/A
Democratic gain from Republican		Swing		

Michigan's 11th Congressional District election, 2012
Party	Candidate	Votes	%	±%
Republican	Kerry Bentivolio	181,788	50.8	−8.5
Democratic	Syed Taj	158,879	44.4	+5.9
Libertarian	John J. Tatar	9,637	2.7	nil
Green	Stephen Paul Duke	4,569	1.3	+1.3
Natural Law	Daniel Johnson	3,251	0.9	+0.9
Independent	Total Write-In	15	nil	
Majority		22,909	6.4%	−14.4
Turnout		358,139		+50.8
Republican hold		Swing		

=== 2014 ===
Michigan's 11th Congressional District election, 2014 – Republican Primary
Party	Candidate	Votes	%	±%
Republican	David Trott	42,008	66.4	N/A
Republican	Kerry Bentivolio (I)	21,254	33.6	−32.7
Majority		20,754	32.8	0.0
Turnout		63,262		−1.3

Michigan's 11th Congressional District election, 2014
Party	Candidate	Votes	%	±%
Republican	David Trott	140,435	55.9	+5.1
Democratic	Bobby McKenzie	101,681	40.5	−3.9
Libertarian	John J. Tatar	7,711	3.1	+0.4
Republican	Kerry Bentivolio (I) (write-in)	1,411	0.6	−50.2
Majority		38,754	15.4%	+9.0
Turnout		251,238		−29.8
Republican hold		Swing		

=== 2016 ===
Michigan's 11th Congressional District election, 2016
Party	Candidate	Votes	%	±%
Republican	David Trott	200,226	52.9	
Democratic	Anil Kumar	152.019	40.2	
Independent	Kerry Bentivolio	16,543	4.4	
Libertarian	Jonathan Ray Osment	9,516	2.5	
Turnout		378,304		{{{change}}}
Republican hold		Swing		

=== 2018 ===
Republican primary results, Michigan's 11th Congressional district, 2018
Party	Candidate	Votes	%
Republican	Lena Epstein	26,843	30.9
Republican	Rocky Raczkowski	22,140	25.5
Republican	Mike Kowall	15,984	18.4
Republican	Klint Kesto	12,164	14.0
Republican	Kerry Bentivolio	9,799	11.3
Total votes		86,930	100

U.S. House of Representatives
Preceded by David Curson	Member of the U.S. House of Representatives from Michigan's 11th congressional district 2013–2015	Succeeded by Dave Trott
U.S. order of precedence (ceremonial)
Preceded by Hansen Clarke as Former U.S. Representative	Order of precedence of the United States as Former U.S. Representative	Succeeded by Peter Meijer as Former U.S. Representative
