= David Curson =

American politician (1948–2024)

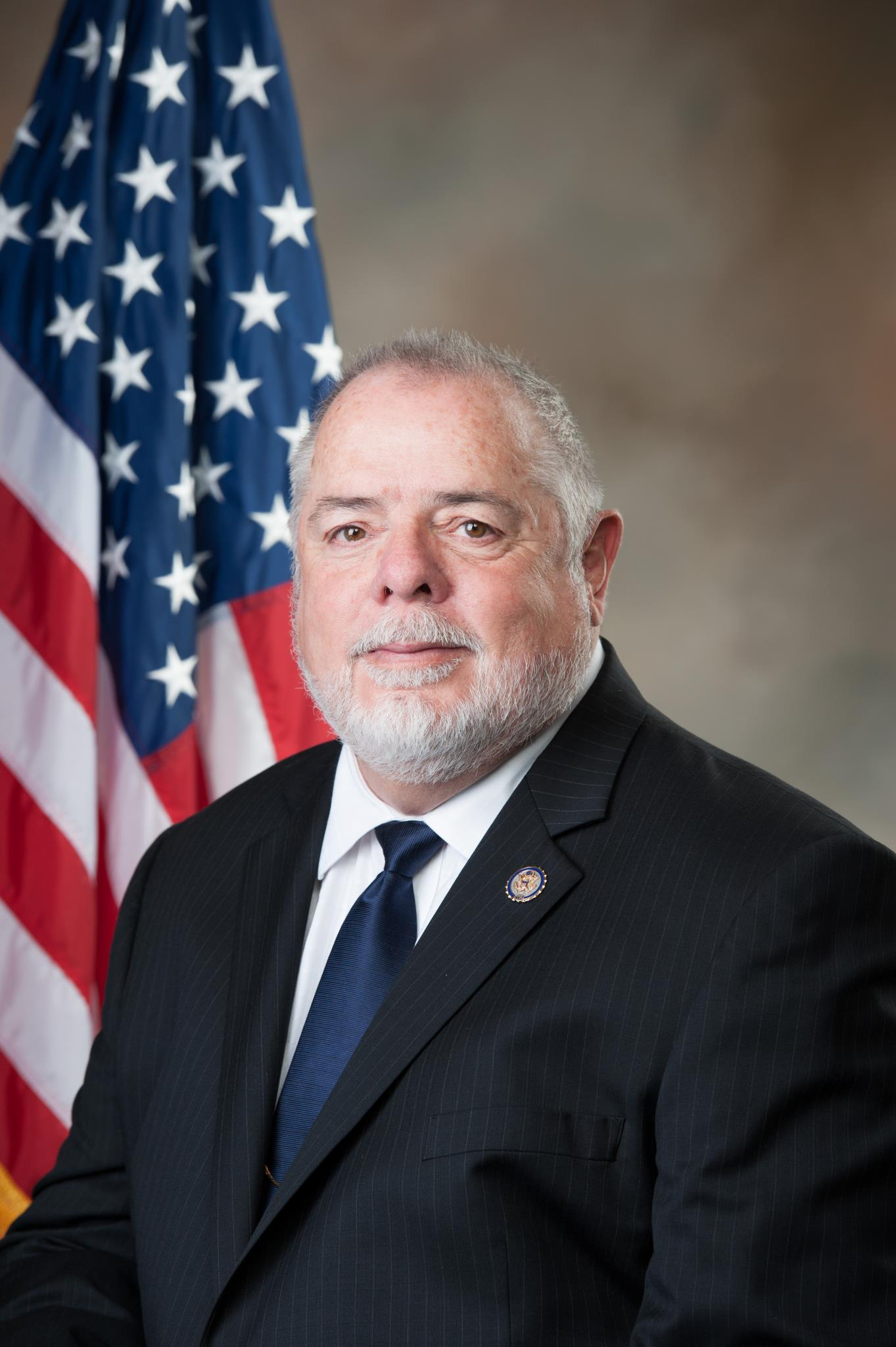
- Official portrait, 2012

Member of the U.S. House of Representatives from Michigan's 11th district
- In office November 6, 2012 – January 3, 2013 (Note: Curson's official service begins on the date of the special election, while he was not sworn in until November 13, 2012.)
- Preceded by: Thaddeus McCotter
- Succeeded by: Kerry Bentivolio

Personal details
- Born: David Alan Curson; November 4, 1948 Toledo, Ohio, U.S.
- Died: September 23, 2024 (aged 75)
- Party: Democratic
- Spouse: Sharon Curson
- Children: 3
- Education: Washtenaw Community College (attended); University of Toledo (attended); Eastern Michigan University (attended); University of Michigan (attended)

David Alan Curson Sr. (November 4, 1948 – September 23, 2024) was an American union representative and politician who was a member of the United States House of Representatives, representing Michigan's 11th congressional district. He is known for having one of the shortest terms in congressional history. Curson defeated Kerry Bentivolio in a special election to replace former Representative Thaddeus McCotter, who resigned in the summer of 2012, and served less than two months. He was a member of the Democratic Party. Curson was a representative for the United Auto Workers.

== Early life, education, and career ==
Curson was born in Toledo, Ohio, to George Curson, a heavy equipment operator for Washington Township, Lucas County, Ohio. He is the youngest of six children. After graduating from high school in 1966, Curson followed in the footsteps of his mother, working at the Libby-Owens-Ford Glass Company, and attended the University of Toledo. However, he dropped out without finishing a degree in order to serve in the United States Marine Corps. After returning from service, he began work at the Ford Rawsonville Plant in Ypsilanti, Michigan.

== United Auto Workers service ==
While working at the Ford Rawsonville Plant, Curson became involved with the UAW and was elected as a representative for the organization. He has been a long-time member of the International Union staff and has served as director of special projects and economic analysis, executive assistant to V.P. Ron Gettelfinger, executive assistant to President Steve Yokich and executive assistant to Secretary Treasurer Dennis Williams. He began negotiating Big Three contracts in 1982 and also testified on behalf of Chrysler and GM at their bankruptcy hearings after President Obama's automotive bailouts.

== Political career ==
Curson was elected in a special election to fill the remainder of former Representative Thaddeus McCotter's term in the 112th United States Congress. McCotter resigned in the summer of 2012 after learning that the majority of petition signatures to get him on the ballot in the August primaries were fraudulent. The Democratic nominee for the general election, Syed Taj, was not a candidate in the special election. Curson stated his intention to retire from politics immediately after his six-week term ended and return to private life, which he fulfilled; Curson was succeeded in January 2013 by Republican Kerry Bentivolio, whom Curson defeated in the special election.

=== Political positions ===
Curson felt that the key to economic success is the creation of jobs. His campaign goals included an increased tax on the rich and additional funding for roads, schools, and energy systems. He also sought legislation that would allow United States employers to safely hire foreign workers more easily and was against the deportation of children brought to the United States by illegal immigrants. He also supported the Affordable Care Act and Planned Parenthood.

== Death ==
Curson died on September 23, 2024, at the age of 75.

== See also ==
- Brenda Jones (politician), elected in a similar situation

U.S. House of Representatives
Preceded by Thad McCotter	Member of the U.S. House of Representatives from Michigan's 11th congressional district November 13, 2012 – January 3, 2013	Succeeded by Kerry Bentivolio
