= Dave Trott (politician) =

American politician (born 1960)

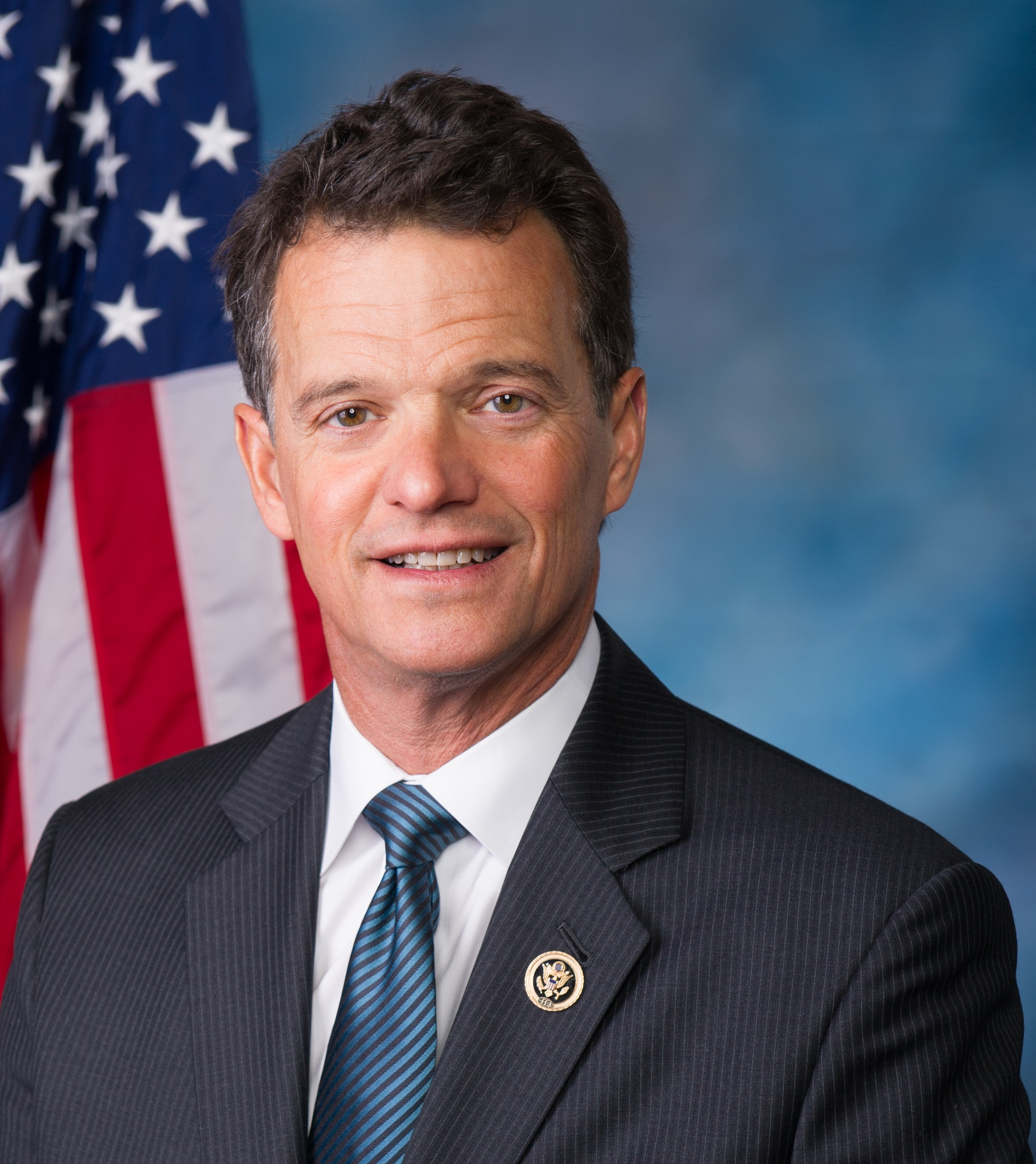
- Official portrait, 2016

Member of the U.S. House of Representatives from Michigan's 11th district
- In office January 3, 2015 – January 3, 2019
- Preceded by: Kerry Bentivolio
- Succeeded by: Haley Stevens

Personal details
- Born: David Alan Trott; October 16, 1960 (age 66) Birmingham, Michigan, U.S.
- Party: Republican (until c. 2020s); Independent (from c. 2020s–present)
- Spouse: Kappy Trott
- Children: 3
- Education: University of Michigan (BA); Duke University (JD)

David Alan Trott (born October 16, 1960) is an American attorney and retired politician who was the U.S. representative from Michigan's 11th congressional district from 2015 to 2019. He was a member of the Republican Party, but has since become an independent.

== Early life and education ==
Trott was born in 1960. He graduated from Cranbrook in 1978, and obtained a bachelor's degree from the University of Michigan in 1981. He graduated from the Duke University School of Law in 1985, receiving his Juris Doctor. Trott was a member of the Bingham Farms Village Council from 1987 to 1988.

== Career ==
Trott was the chairman and CEO of Trott & Trott PC, which represents banks and lenders in homeowner foreclosure and bankruptcy litigation. He is the owner of Attorneys Title Agency LLC and its subsidiaries. Trott is also the co-owner of Dietz Trott Sports & Entertainment, and owns Trott Recovery Services. He was chairman and CEO of NDeX, and been affiliated with Detroit Legal News Publishing, the U.S. Foreclosure Network, and First American Financial Corporation. Trott's legal career and impact on the community was profiled by the Detroit Free Press on May 18, 2014.

Trott was on the boards of the University of Michigan, On My Own, the Detroit Country Day School, The Community House, and the Karmanos Cancer Institute. He is a partner of 23 energy companies. He was a candidate for the Oakland Community College Board of Trustees in 2012.

Trott chaired the Oakland County Lincoln Day Dinner, a Republican fundraising event. He was a major donor to the Republican National Committee and the presidential campaigns of John McCain and Mitt Romney.

== U.S. House of Representatives ==
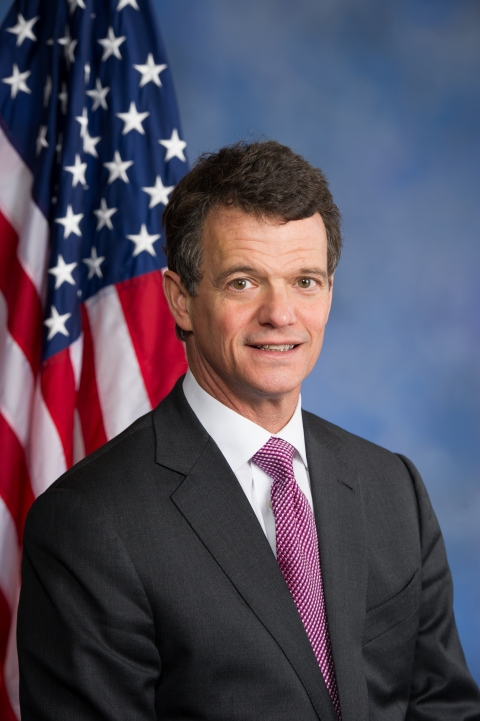
Trott during the 114th Congress

=== Elections ===
==== 2014 ====
On September 4, 2013, Trott announced his candidacy for Michigan's 11th congressional district, challenging incumbent freshman Congressman Kerry Bentivolio. Former Michigan State Senate Majority Leader Mike Bishop, Wayne County Commissioner Laura Cox, former Congressional candidate Rocky Raczkowski, and Republican Committeewoman Ronna Romney McDaniel were announced as his campaign co-chairs. The Michigan Chamber of Commerce and the United States Chamber of Commerce endorsed Trott's campaign, joining more than 350 other individuals and elected officials.

On May 27 Michigan Information and Research Service published the results of a Republican primary poll for the 11th Congressional District that showed Bentivolio at 33% to Trott's 21%, with a large portion of the district undecided.

Trott enjoyed a significant advantage in resources over his opponent throughout the campaign, with more than $1 million in the bank following the first quarter of 2014 to Bentivolio's $130,000. According to Federal Election Campaign filings, Trott personally contributed over $2,400,000 to his own primary run and outspent the incumbent approximately 20:1. He defeated Bentivolio in the August 5 primary. Bentivolio tried to initiate a write-in campaign for the November general election against Trott and Democrat Bobby McKenzie, but that effort failed.

==== 2016 ====
Trott won reelection with 53% of the vote against Democrat Anil Kumar, who had 40%, Libertarian Jonathan Ray Osment with 3%, and Independent Kerry Bentivolio with 4%.

In September 2017 Trott announced that he would not run for reelection in 2018.

=== Committee assignments ===
- Committee on Financial Services
- Committee on Foreign Affairs
  - Subcommittee on Europe, Eurasia and Emerging Threats
  - Subcommittee on the Middle East and North Africa
- Committee on the Judiciary
  - Subcommittee on Immigration and Border Security
  - Subcommittee on Regulatory Reform, Commercial and Antitrust Law

=== Caucus memberships ===
- United States Congressional International Conservation Caucus
- Climate Solutions Caucus
- Republican Main Street Partnership
- Problem Solvers Caucus

== Political stances ==
Trott supported school choice programs, supported and introduced gun control legislation, and was supportive of the Supreme Court's decision on same-sex marriage. He was critical during his second term of President Trump's policies on foreign affairs, trade and immigration.

=== National security ===
Trott supported President Donald Trump's 2017 executive order to impose a temporary ban on entry to the U.S. to citizens of several Muslim-majority countries, saying, "Until we can adequately vet these refugees and ensure the safety of all Americans, I support President Trump’s executive order to stay refugees from these terror-prone countries." Trott later expressed regret during a speech in Northern Michigan that he supported some of President Trump's policies on refugees.

=== Health care ===
On May 4, 2017, Trott voted in favor of repealing the Patient Protection and Affordable Care Act (Obamacare) and to pass the American Health Care Act. He publicly called Trump "unhelpful on health care."

== Hot mic incident ==
On March 18, 2017, Trott held a town hall meeting. Topics discussed included the repeal and replacement of the ACA funding for social programs, and whether Trump's tweets were a good strategy. After the town-hall meeting, Trott and his aide, Stu Sandler, were caught on a hot mic stating "We're going to take that part where they're booing funding for the military and I'm going to get somebody to write a story and we're going to promote the shit out of that", adding "It's un-American crap." Review of the tape shows that the booing begins after Trott said the American military was "the weakest it's ever been" rather than related to military funding.

U.S. House of Representatives
Preceded by Kerry Bentivolio	Member of the U.S. House of Representatives from Michigan's 11th congressional district 2015–2019	Succeeded by Haley Stevens
U.S. order of precedence (ceremonial)
Preceded by Mike Bishop as Former U.S. Representative	Order of precedence of the United States as Former U.S. Representative	Succeeded by Andy Levin as Former U.S. Representative
