= 2014 United States House of Representatives elections =

House elections for the 114th U.S. Congress

- November 4, 2014

All 435 seats in the United States House of Representatives (Note: In addition, five of the six non-voting delegates in the U.S. House of Representatives were elected.) 218 seats needed for a majority
- Turnout: 36.4% ▼15.6 pp
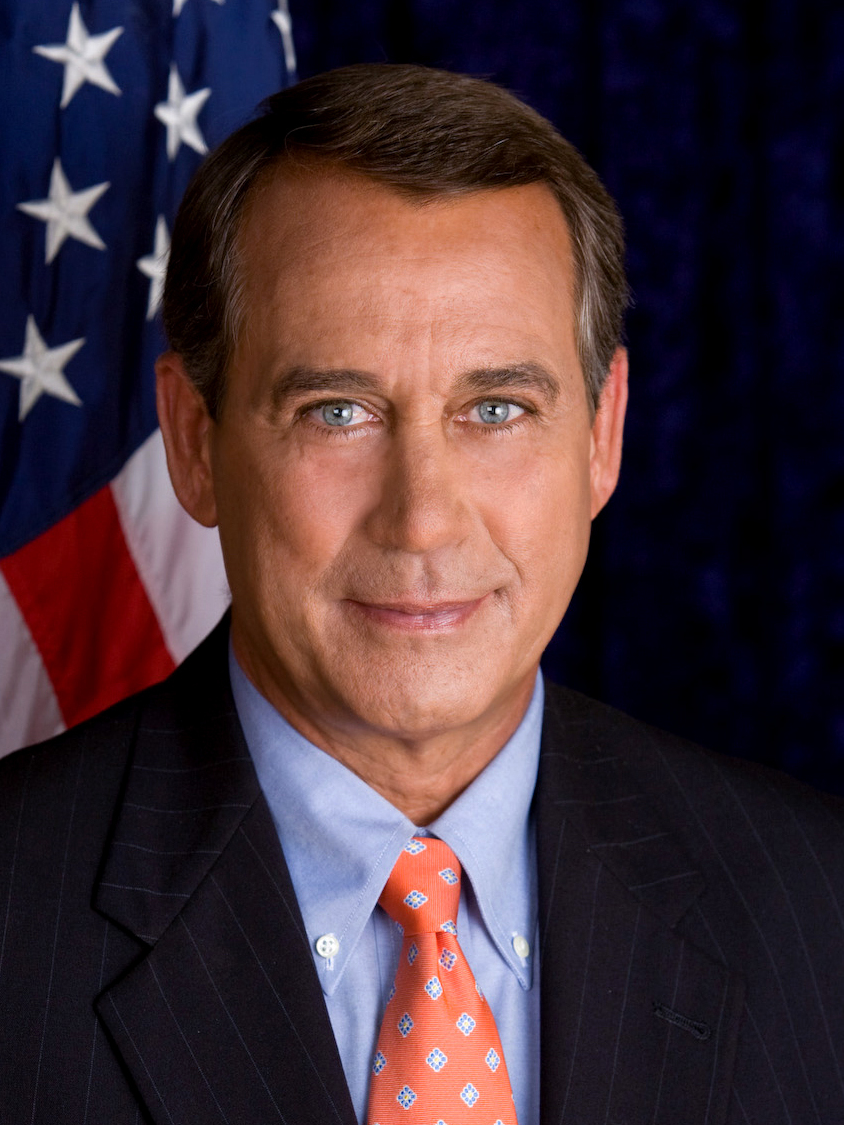

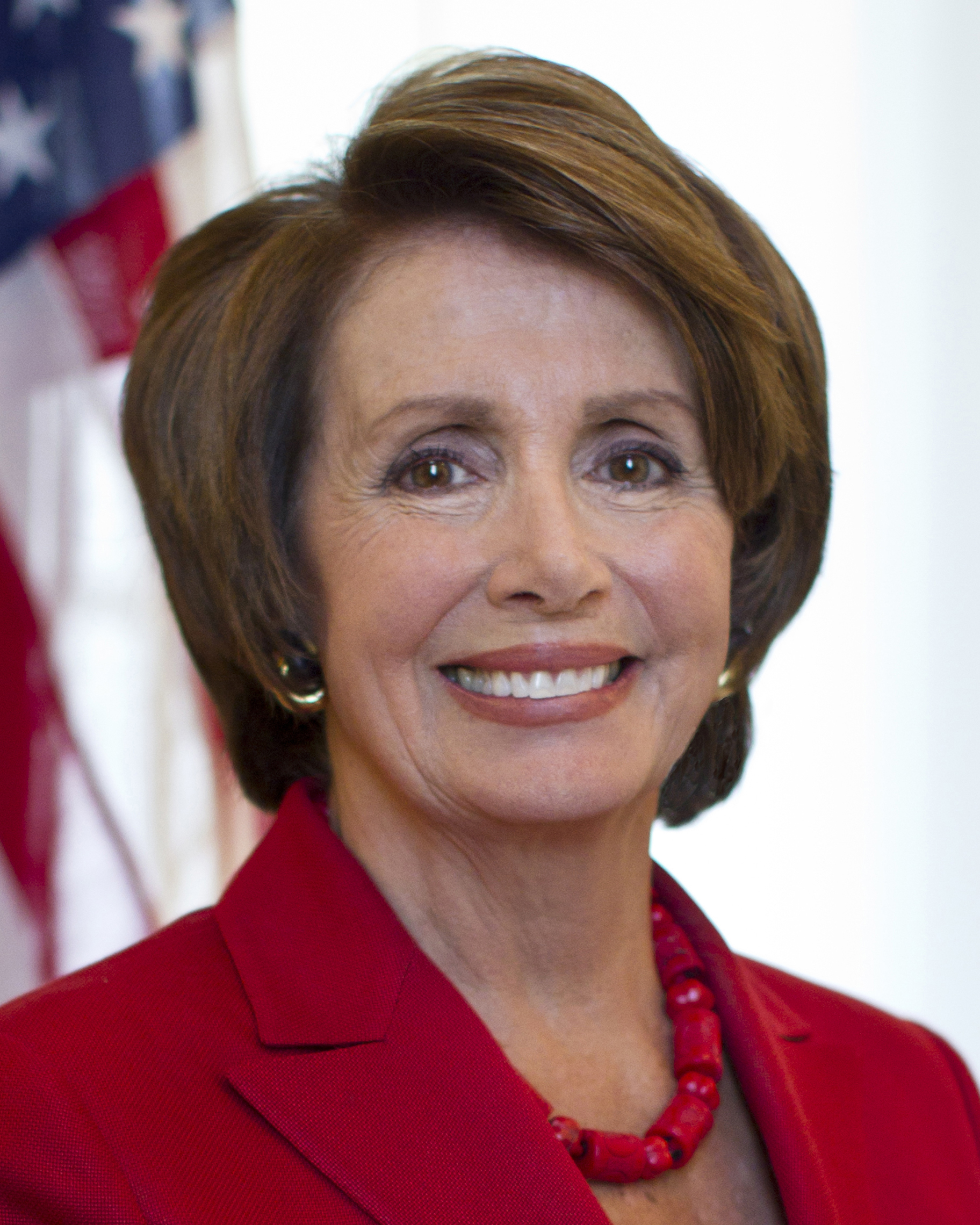
	Majority party	Minority party
Leader	John Boehner	Nancy Pelosi
Party	Republican	Democratic
Leader since	January 3, 2007	January 3, 2003
Leader's seat	Ohio 8th	California 12th
Last election	234 seats, 47.6%	201 seats, 48.8%
Seats won	247	188
Seat change	▲13	▼13
Popular vote	40,081,282	35,624,357
Percentage	51.2%	45.5%
Swing	▲3.6pp	▼3.3pp
- Results: Democratic hold Democratic gain Republican hold Republican gain
Speaker before election
John Boehner
Republican
Elected Speaker
John Boehner
Republican

The 2014 United States House of Representatives elections were held on November 4, 2014, in the middle of President Barack Obama's second term in office. Elections were held for all 435 seats of the House of Representatives, representing the 50 states. Elections were also held for the non-voting delegates from the District of Columbia and four of the five territories. The winners of these elections served in the 114th United States Congress, with seats apportioned among the states based on the 2010 United States census.

The Republicans won 16 seats from Democrats, while three Republican-held seats turned Democratic. The Republicans achieved their largest majority in the House since 1928 due to a sizeable Republican wave. Combined with the Republican gains made in 2010, the total number of Democratic-held House seats lost under Barack Obama's presidency in midterm elections rose to 77 with these elections. This marked the highest number of House seats lost under a two-term president of the same party since Harry S. Truman. With 36.4% of eligible voters voting, the voter turnout was the lowest since 1942.

As of 2026, this is the last time Republicans won a House seat in New Hampshire and the last time Republicans won more than one House seat in the New England region.

== Results summary ==
=== Federal ===
↓
188	247
Democratic	Republican

Parties	Seats				Popular vote		
Parties	2012	2014	Net change	Strength	Vote	%	Change
Republican Party	234	247	▲13	56.8%	40,081,282	51.2%	+3.6%
Democratic Party	201	188	▼13	43.2%	35,624,357	45.5%	-3.3%
Libertarian Party	–	–	–	–	954,077	1.2%	+0.1%
Independent	–	–	–	–	640,994	0.8%	+0.2%
Green Party	–	–	–	–	246,567	0.3%	–
Independence Party	–	–	–	–	81,498	0.1%	+0.1%
Constitution Party	–	–	–	–	58,863	0.1%	–
Americans Elect Party	–	–	–	–	44,924	0.1%	+0.1%
Others	-	-	-	-	502,678	0.6%	-0.4%
Totals	435	435	0	100.0%	78,235,240	100.0%	-

Source: Election Statistics – Office of the Clerk (does not include blank and over/under votes)

=== Per states ===
State	Total seats	Democratic		Republican	
State	Total seats	Seats	Change	Seats	Change
Alabama	7	1	Steady	6	Steady
Alaska	1	0	Steady	1	Steady
Arizona	9	4	▼1	5	▲1
Arkansas	4	0	Steady	4	Steady
California	53	39	▲1	14	▼1
Colorado	7	3	Steady	4	Steady
Connecticut	5	5	Steady	0	Steady
Delaware	1	1	Steady	0	Steady
Florida	27	10	Steady	17	Steady
Georgia	14	4	▼1	10	▲1
Hawaii	2	2	Steady	0	Steady
Idaho	2	0	Steady	2	Steady
Illinois	18	10	▼2	8	▲2
Indiana	9	2	Steady	7	Steady
Iowa	4	1	▼1	3	▲1
Kansas	4	0	Steady	4	Steady
Kentucky	6	1	Steady	5	Steady
Louisiana	6	1	Steady	5	Steady
Maine	2	1	▼1	1	▲1
Maryland	8	7	Steady	1	Steady
Massachusetts	9	9	Steady	0	Steady
Michigan	14	5	Steady	9	Steady
Minnesota	8	5	Steady	3	Steady
Mississippi	4	1	Steady	3	Steady
Missouri	8	2	Steady	6	Steady
Montana	1	0	Steady	1	Steady
Nebraska	3	1	▲1	2	▼1
Nevada	4	1	▼1	3	▲1
New Hampshire	2	1	▼1	1	▲1
New Jersey	12	6	Steady	6	Steady
New Mexico	3	2	Steady	1	Steady
New York	27	18	▼3	9	▲3
North Carolina	13	3	▼1	10	▲1
North Dakota	1	0	Steady	1	Steady
Ohio	16	4	Steady	12	Steady
Oklahoma	5	0	Steady	5	Steady
Oregon	5	4	Steady	1	Steady
Pennsylvania	18	5	Steady	13	Steady
Rhode Island	2	2	Steady	0	Steady
South Carolina	7	1	Steady	6	Steady
South Dakota	1	0	Steady	1	Steady
Tennessee	9	2	Steady	7	Steady
Texas	36	11	▼1	25	▲1
Utah	4	0	▼1	4	▲1
Vermont	1	1	Steady	0	Steady
Virginia	11	3	Steady	8	Steady
Washington	10	6	Steady	4	Steady
West Virginia	3	0	▼1	3	▲1
Wisconsin	8	3	Steady	5	Steady
Wyoming	1	0	Steady	1	Steady
Total	435	188	▼13	247	▲13

Popular vote
Republican	51.23%
Democratic	45.53%
Libertarian	1.22%
Green	0.32%
Other	1.70%

House seats
Republican	56.78%
Democratic	43.22%

=== Maps ===
Number of seats won by state

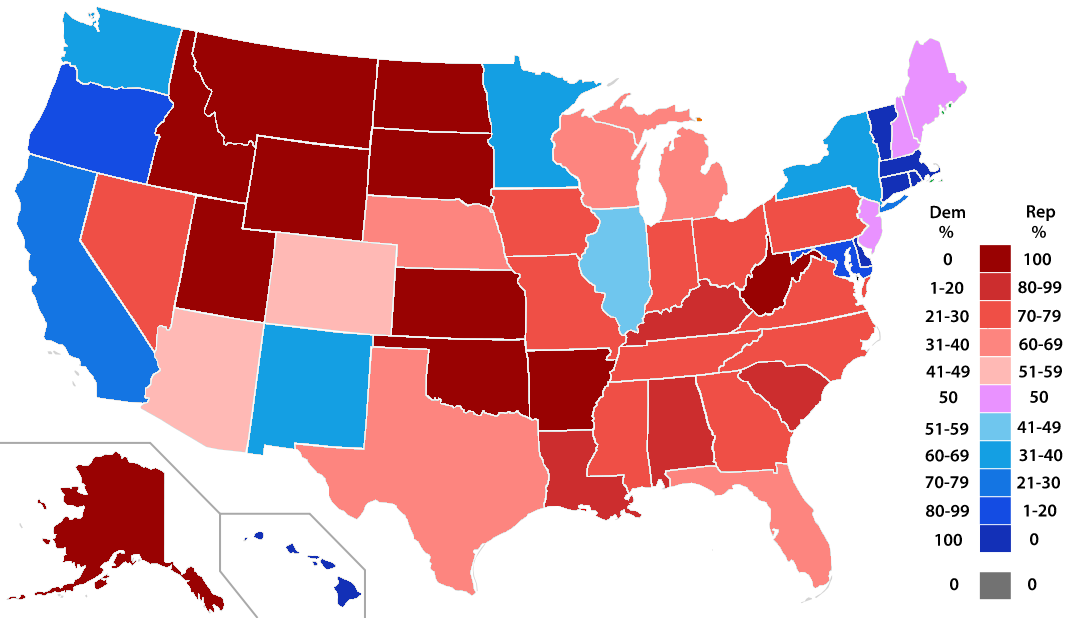
House seats by party holding plurality in state

Defeated incumbents by party.

Results shaded according to winning candidate's share of vote

== Exit poll ==
2014 U.S. House elections exit poll
Response category	DEM	GOP	Other	% of total vote
Total vote	46	51	3	100
Ideology
Liberals	87	11	2	23
Moderates	53	45	2	40
Conservatives	13	85	2	37
Party
Democrats	92	7	1	35
Republicans	5	94	1	36
Independents	42	54	4	28
Party by gender
Democratic men	92	7	1	14
Democratic women	92	7	1	21
Republican men	5	94	1	19
Republican women	5	94	1	18
Independent men	38	57	5	17
Independent women	46	50	4	12
Gender
Men	41	57	2	49
Women	51	47	2	51
Marital status
Married	40	58	2	63
Unmarried	55	42	3	37
Gender by marital status
Married men	37	61	2	33
Married women	44	54	2	30
Non-married men	49	48	3	16
Non-married women	60	38	2	21
Race/ethnicity
White	38	60	2	75
Black	89	10	1	12
Asian	49	50	1	3
Other	49	47	4	2
Hispanic (of any race)	62	36	2	8
Gender by race/ethnicity
White men	33	64	3	37
White women	42	56	2	38
Black men	86	13	1	5
Black women	91	8	1	7
Latino men (of any race)	57	41	2	4
Latina women (of any race)	66	32	2	4
All other races	49	48	3	5
Religion
Protestant	37	61	2	53
Catholic	45	54	1	24
Jewish	66	33	1	3
Other religion	67	31	2	8
None	69	29	2	12
Religious service attendance
More than weekly	40	59	1	13
Weekly	40	58	2	27
Monthly	43	55	2	14
A few times a year	48	51	1	26
Never	62	36	2	18
White evangelical or born-again Christian
White evangelical or born-again Christian	20	78	2	26
Everyone else	55	43	2	74
Age
18–24 years old	54	44	2	7
25–29 years old	54	43	3	6
30–39 years old	51	47	2	13
40–49 years old	44	54	2	19
50–64 years old	46	52	2	33
65 and older	41	57	2	22
Age by race
Whites 18–29 years old	43	54	3	8
Whites 30–44 years old	40	58	2	15
Whites 45–64 years old	36	62	2	32
Whites 65 and older	36	62	2	19
Blacks 18–29 years old	88	11	1	2
Blacks 30–44 years old	86	12	2	3
Blacks 45–64 years old	90	9	1	5
Blacks 65 and older	92	7	1	2
Latinos 18–29 years old	68	28	4	2
Latinos 30–44 years old	56	42	2	2
Latinos 45–64 years old	62	37	1	3
Latinos 65 and older	64	34	2	1
Others	49	49	2	5
Sexual orientation
LGBT	75	24	1	4
Heterosexual	45	53	2	96
Education
Not a high school graduate	54	44	2	2
High school graduate	45	53	2	18
Some college education	44	54	2	29
College graduate	44	54	2	31
Postgraduate education	53	45	2	20
Education by race/ethnicity
White college graduates	41	57	2	39
White no college degree	34	64	2	36
Non-white college graduates	70	28	2	11
Non-white no college degree	74	25	1	14
Family income
Under $30,000	59	39	2	16
$30,000–49,999	51	47	2	20
$50,000–99,999	44	55	1	34
$100,000–199,999	41	57	2	23
Over $200,000	42	57	1	7
Union households
Union	60	38	2	17
Non-union	44	54	2	83
Military service
Veterans	39	59	2	17
Non-veterans	49	49	2	83
Region
Northeast	55	43	2	20
Midwest	45	53	2	25
South	38	59	3	33
West	50	48	2	22
Community size
Urban	56	42	2	32
Suburban	43	55	2	52
Rural	38	59	3	16
Obama job approval
Strongly approve	91	8	1	20
Somewhat approve	84	15	1	24
Somewhat disapprove	37	59	4	13
Strongly disapprove	8	90	2	42
Vote today to express support or opposition for Obama
To express opposition to Barack Obama	5	92	3	33
Barack Obama was not a factor	55	43	2	45
To express support for Barack Obama	93	6	1	19
Feelings about the Obama administration
Angry	5	93	2	27
Dissatisfied, but not angry	29	68	3	32
Satisfied, but not enthusiastic	84	15	1	29
Enthusiastic	93	5	2	10
Congress approval rating
Strongly approve	56	43	1	3
Somewhat approve	53	46	1	17
Somewhat disapprove	42	56	2	30
Strongly disapprove	48	50	2	48
Feelings about Republican leaders in Congress
Angry	84	13	3	22
Dissatisfied, but not angry	53	45	2	37
Satisfied, but not enthusiastic	17	81	2	32
Enthusiastic	12	86	2	7
Democratic Party favorability
Favorable	90	8	2	43
Unfavorable	12	86	2	55
Republican Party favorability
Favorable	10	88	2	42
Unfavorable	74	24	2	54
Tea Party movement
Strongly support	9	89	2	13
Somewhat support	16	81	3	19
Neutral	41	57	2	28
Somewhat oppose	58	40	2	10
Strongly oppose	87	11	2	26
Direction of the country
Seriously off on the wrong track	28	69	3	65
Generally going in the right direction	82	17	1	31
Opinion of the role of government
Doing things better left to businesses/individuals	21	77	2	54
Should do more to solve problems	78	21	1	41
Life for the next generation of Americans will be
Worse than life today	29	69	2	48
About the same	60	38	2	27
Better than life today	68	31	1	22
How often federal government can be trusted to make right decision
Never	27	70	3	18
Only some of the time	44	54	2	60
Most of the time	71	28	1	17
Just about always	72	28	N/A	3
How closely followed news about the 2014 elections
Extremely closely	38	60	2	18
Very closely	44	54	2	32
Somewhat closely	48	50	2	36
Not too closely	54	43	3	12
Issue regarded as most important
Economy	48	50	2	45
Health care	59	39	2	25
Illegal immigration	24	74	2	14
Foreign policy	42	56	2	13
Concern about the direction of nation's economy
Very worried	30	68	2	38
Somewhat worried	48	50	2	41
Not too worried	72	27	1	17
Not at all worried	79	19	2	4
Condition of the nation's economy
Poor	18	79	3	22
Not so good	41	58	1	48
Good	74	24	2	28
Excellent	N/A	N/A	N/A	1
Condition and direction of the nation's economy
Getting worse	20	77	3	32
Poor and staying the same	34	65	1	27
Good and staying the same	70	28	2	6
Getting better	75	23	2	32
Family's financial situation compared to two years ago
Better	75	23	2	28
About the same	49	49	2	45
Worse	30	67	3	25
U.S. economic system generally favors
Favors the wealthy	64	35	2	63
Is fair to most Americans	17	81	2	32
View of Affordable Care Act
Went too far	14	84	2	49
Was about right	80	19	1	21
Did not go far enough	78	19	3	25
How closely followed news about Ebola
Extremely closely	45	53	2	24
Very closely	46	53	1	35
Somewhat closely	45	52	3	30
Not too closely	51	46	3	9
Most illegal immigrants working in the United States should be
Offered a chance to apply for legal status	64	35	1	57
Deported to the country they came from	23	75	2	39
View of current U.S. military action against ISIS
Approve	49	49	2	58
Disapprove	41	56	3	35
Concern about another major terrorist attack in the United States
Very worried	32	66	2	28
Somewhat worried	44	55	1	43
Not too worried	67	31	2	22
Not at all worried	74	23	3	6
Support for state legalizing same-sex marriage
Yes	67	31	2	48
No	27	72	1	48
Marijuana use should be
Legal	60	38	2	49
Illegal	31	67	2	47
Abortion should be
Legal in all cases	74	24	2	23
Legal in most cases	57	41	2	29
Illegal in most cases	23	75	2	27
Illegal in all cases	28	71	1	17
Race relations in the United States in last few years have
Gotten better	54	44	2	20
Stayed about the same	53	46	1	40
Gotten worse	36	62	2	38
Climate change is a serious problem
Yes	70	29	1	57
No	14	84	2	41
Hillary Clinton would make a good president
Yes	83	15	2	42
No	14	83	2	53
Jeb Bush would make a good president
Yes	19	79	2	29
No	61	37	2	59
Chris Christie would make a good president
Yes	29	69	2	24
No	53	45	2	64
Rand Paul would make a good president
Yes	20	78	2	26
No	59	39	2	60
Rick Perry would make a good president
Yes	15	84	1	24
No	59	38	3	62
Candidate more likely to vote for in 2016 presidential election
Republican candidate	5	94	1	40
Hillary Clinton	91	8	3	34
It depends	54	42	4	23

Source: NBC News exit poll

== Incumbents who retired ==
Retiring incumbents by district Democratic incumbent ran Democratic incumbent retired or lost renomination Republican incumbent ran Republican incumbent retired or lost renomination Vacant district

Forty-one representatives retired from their seats.

=== Democrats ===
Sixteen Democrats (seventeen, including the delegate from the Virgin Islands) retired from their seats.

1. Arizona 7: Ed Pastor retired.
2. California 11: George Miller retired.
3. California 33: Henry Waxman retired.
4. California 35: Gloria Negrete McLeod retired to run for the San Bernardino County Board of Supervisors.
5. Hawaii 1: Colleen Hanabusa retired to run for the U.S. Senate.
6. Iowa 1: Bruce Braley retired to run for the U.S. Senate.
7. Maine 2: Mike Michaud retired to run for governor of Maine.
8. Michigan 12: John Dingell retired.
9. Michigan 14: Gary Peters retired to run for the U.S. Senate.
10. New Jersey 12: Rush Holt Jr. retired.
11. New York 4: Carolyn McCarthy retired.
12. New York 21: Bill Owens retired.
13. North Carolina 7: Mike McIntyre retired.
14. Pennsylvania 13: Allyson Schwartz retired to run for governor of Pennsylvania.
15. Utah 4: Jim Matheson retired.
16. Virgin Islands: Donna Christian-Christensen retired to run for governor of the Virgin Islands.
17. Virginia 8: Jim Moran retired.

=== Republicans ===
Twenty-five Republicans retired from their seats.

1. Alabama 6: Spencer Bachus retired.
2. Arkansas 2: Tim Griffin retired to run for lieutenant governor of Arkansas.
3. Arkansas 4: Tom Cotton retired to run for the U.S. Senate.
4. California 25: Buck McKeon retired.
5. California 31: Gary Miller retired.
6. California 45: John B. T. Campbell III retired.
7. Colorado 4: Cory Gardner retired to run for the U.S. Senate.
8. Georgia 1: Jack Kingston retired to run for the U.S. Senate.
9. Georgia 10: Paul Broun retired to run for the U.S. Senate.
10. Georgia 11: Phil Gingrey retired to run for the U.S. Senate.
11. Iowa 3: Tom Latham retired.
12. Louisiana 6: Bill Cassidy retired to run for the U.S. Senate.
13. Michigan 4: Dave Camp retired.
14. Michigan 8: Mike Rogers retired.
15. Minnesota 6: Michele Bachmann retired.
16. Montana at-large: Steve Daines retired to run for the U.S. Senate.
17. New Jersey 3: Jon Runyan retired.
18. North Carolina 6: Howard Coble retired.
19. Oklahoma 5: James Lankford retired to run for the U.S. Senate.
20. Pennsylvania 6: Jim Gerlach retired.
21. Texas 36: Steve Stockman retired to run for the U.S. Senate.
22. Virginia 10: Frank Wolf retired.
23. Washington 4: Doc Hastings retired.
24. West Virginia 2: Shelley Moore Capito retired to run for the U.S. Senate.
25. Wisconsin 6: Tom Petri retired.

== Incumbents defeated ==
=== In primary elections ===
1. Louisiana 5: Vance McAllister (R) lost a Nonpartisan blanket primary to Jamie Mayo (D) and Ralph Abraham (R). Abraham then won the runoff. Republican hold.
2. Massachusetts 6: John F. Tierney (D) lost renomination to Seth Moulton (D), who then won the general election. Democratic hold.
3. Michigan 11: Kerry Bentivolio (R) lost renomination to David Trott (R), who then won the general election. Republican hold.
4. Texas 4: Ralph Hall (R), lost renomination to John Ratcliffe (R), who then won the general election. Republican hold.
5. Virginia 7: Eric Cantor (R) lost renomination to Dave Brat (R), who then won the general election. Republican hold.

=== In the general election ===
Republicans had a net gain of nine seats, taken from Democrats.

==== Democrats ====
Twelve Democrats lost re-election to Republicans.

1. Arizona 2: Ron Barber (D) lost to Martha McSally (R).
2. Florida 26: Joe Garcia (D) lost to Carlos Curbelo (R).
3. Georgia 12: John Barrow (D) lost to Rick W. Allen (R).
4. Illinois 10: Brad Schneider (D) lost to Bob Dold (R).
5. Illinois 12: Bill Enyart (D) lost to Mike Bost (R).
6. Nevada 4: Steven Horsford (D) lost to Cresent Hardy (R).
7. New Hampshire 1: Carol Shea-Porter (D) lost to Frank Guinta (R).
8. New York 1: Tim Bishop (D) lost to Lee Zeldin (R).
9. New York 24: Dan Maffei (D) lost to John Katko (R).
10. Texas 23: Pete Gallego (D) lost to Will Hurd (R).
11. West Virginia 3: Nick Rahall (D) lost to Evan Jenkins (R).
12. American Samoa: Eni Faleomavaega (D) lost to Amata Coleman Radewagen (R).

==== Republicans ====
Two Republicans lost re-election to Democrats.

1. Florida 2: Steve Southerland (R) lost to Gwen Graham (D).
2. Nebraska 2: Lee Terry (R) lost to Brad Ashford (D).

== Open seat gains ==
Republicans had a net gain of four seats previously held by Democrats.

=== Democratic to Republican ===
Five open seats previously held by Democrats were won by Republicans.

1. Iowa 1: Bruce Braley (D) retired to run for U.S. Senate. Seat won by Rod Blum (R).
2. Maine 2: Mike Michaud (D) retired to run for Governor of Maine. Seat won by Bruce Poliquin (R).
3. New York 21: Bill Owens (D) retired. Seat won by Elise Stefanik (R).
4. North Carolina 7: Mike McIntyre (D) retired. Seat won by David Rouzer (R).
5. Utah 4: Jim Matheson (D) retired. Seat won by Mia Love (R).

=== Republican to Democratic ===
One open seat previously held by a Republican was won by a Democrat.

1. California 31: Gary Miller (R) retired. Seat won by Pete Aguilar (D).

== Closest races ==
Forty-seven races were decided by 10% or lower.

District	Winner	Margin
Arizona 2nd	Republican (flip)	0.07%
New York 25th	Democratic	0.45%
California 7th	Democratic	0.79%
Florida 2nd	Democratic (flip)	1.13%
Minnesota 8th	Democratic	1.40%
California 16th	Democratic	1.46%
Maryland 6th	Democratic	1.46%
Washington 4th	Republican	1.61% (Note: Under Washington's "jungle primary" system, the general election was between two Republicans.)
New York 18th	Democratic	1.86%
Texas 23rd	Republican (flip)	2.10%
Iowa 1st	Republican (flip)	2.29%
Illinois 10th	Republican (flip)	2.59%
California 26th	Democratic	2.66%
Nevada 4th	Republican (flip)	2.77%
Florida 26th	Republican (flip)	2.93%
California 52nd	Democratic	3.17%
West Virginia 2nd	Republican	3.20%
Nebraska 2nd	Democratic (flip)	3.33%
California 31st	Democratic (flip)	3.47%
California 17th	Democratic	3.51% (Note: Under California's "jungle primary" system, the general election was between two Democrats.)
New Hampshire 1st	Republican (flip)	3.60%
California 24th	Democratic	3.85%
Hawaii 1st	Democratic	3.86%
California 9th	Democratic	4.74%
Utah 4th	Republican (flip)	5.10%
Iowa 2nd	Democratic	5.11%
Maine 2nd	Republican (flip)	5.20%
Arizona 1st	Democratic	5.22%
California 3rd	Democratic	5.45%
New York 4th	Democratic	5.69%
Missouri 5th	Democratic	6.63%
California 25th	Republican	6.68% (Note: Under California's "jungle primary" system, the general election was between two Republicans.)
Michigan 1st	Republican	6.86%
Illinois 11th	Democratic	6.92%
Connecticut 5th	Democratic	7.41%
Connecticut 4th	Democratic	7.52%
Arkansas 2nd	Republican	8.26%
California 36th	Democratic	8.37%
Minnesota 1st	Democratic	8.52%
Minnesota 7th	Democratic	8.55%
New York 1st	Republican (flip)	8.86%
Colorado 6th	Republican	8.91%
Washington 10th	Democratic	9.40%
Georgia 12th	Republican (flip)	9.51%
New York 3rd	Democratic	9.59%
New Jersey 3rd	Republican	9.64%
Massachusetts 9th	Democratic	9.96%

North Carolina's 13th was the tipping point seat.

== Special elections ==
Five special elections were held in 2014.

- Two elections were held concurrent with the November elections. The winners received a seniority advantage over other freshmen, as their seniority starts on the day of the elections.
- Three elections were held separate from the November general elections.

District	Incumbent			This race	
District	Representative	Party	First elected	Results	Candidates
Florida 13	Bill Young	Republican	1970	Incumbent died October 18, 2013, having already announced his retirement. New member elected March 11, 2014. Republican hold. Successor was later elected to the next term, see below.	▌ ✓ David Jolly (Republican) 48.4%; ▌Alex Sink (Democratic) 46.6%; ▌Lucas Overby (Libertarian) 4.8%
Florida 19	Trey Radel	Republican	2012	Incumbent resigned January 27, 2014. New member elected June 24, 2014. Republican hold. Successor was later elected to the next term, see below.	▌ ✓ Curt Clawson (Republican) 66.65%; ▌April Freeman (Democratic) 29.32%; ▌Ray Netherwood (Libertarian) 3.73%
New Jersey 1	Rob Andrews	Democratic	1990 (special)	Incumbent resigned February 18, 2014. New member elected November 4, 2014. Democratic hold. Successor was also elected the same day to the next term, see below.	▌ ✓ Donald Norcross (Democratic) 57.3%; ▌Garry Cobb (Republican) 39.5%; ▌Scot John Tomaszewski (Independent) 1.1%; ▌Margaret Chapman (Independent) 0.7%; ▌Robert Shapiro (Independent) 0.7; ▌Mike Berman (Independent) 0.4%; ▌Donald Letton (Independent) 0.3%
North Carolina 12	Mel Watt	Democratic	1992	Incumbent resigned January 6, 2014 to become Director of the Federal Housing Finance Agency. Primary elections were held May 6, 2014. New member elected November 4, 2014. Democratic hold. Successor was also elected the same day to the next term, see below.	▌ ✓ Alma Adams (Democratic) 75.4%; ▌Vince Coakley (Republican) 24.6%
Virginia 7	Eric Cantor	Republican	2000	Incumbent resigned August 18, 2014, having lost renomination to the next term. Candidates were nominated by their respective parties. New member elected November 4, 2014. Republican hold. Successor was also elected the same day to the next term, see below.	▌ ✓ Dave Brat (Republican) 62.0%; ▌Jack Trammell (Democratic) 38.0%

== Alabama ==
District		Incumbent			This race	
Location	PVI	Representative	Party	First elected	Status	Candidates
Alabama 1	R+15	Bradley Byrne	Republican	2013 (special)	Incumbent re-elected.	▌ ✓ Bradley Byrne (Republican) 68.2%; ▌Burton LeFlore (Democratic) 31.7%
Alabama 2	R+17	Martha Roby	Republican	2010	Incumbent re-elected.	▌ ✓ Martha Roby (Republican) 67.3%; ▌Erick Wright (Democratic) 32.6%
Alabama 3	R+16	Mike Rogers	Republican	2002	Incumbent re-elected.	▌ ✓ Mike Rogers (Republican) 66.1%; ▌Jesse Smith (Democratic) 33.7%
Alabama 4	R+28	Robert Aderholt	Republican	1996	Incumbent re-elected.	▌ ✓ Robert Aderholt (Republican) 98.6%
Alabama 5	R+17	Mo Brooks	Republican	2010	Incumbent re-elected.	▌ ✓ Mo Brooks (Republican) 74.4%; ▌Mark Bray (Independent) 25.2%
Alabama 6	R+28	Spencer Bachus	Republican	1992	Incumbent retired. Republican hold.	▌ ✓ Gary Palmer (Republican) 76.2%; ▌Mark Lester (Democratic) 23.7%; ▌Aimee Love (Libertarian) 0.1%
Alabama 7	D+20	Terri Sewell	Democratic	2010	Incumbent re-elected.	▌ ✓ Terri Sewell (Democratic) 98.4%

== Alaska ==
District		Incumbent			This race	
Location	PVI	Incumbent	Party	First elected	Result	Candidates
Alaska at-large	R+12	Don Young	Republican	1973 (special)	Incumbent re-elected.	▌ ✓ Don Young (Republican) 51.0%; ▌Forrest Dunbar (Democratic) 41.0%; ▌Jim C. McDermott (Libertarian) 7.6%

== Arizona ==
District		Incumbent			This race	
Location	PVI	Representative	Party	First elected	Status	Candidates
Arizona 1	R+4	Ann Kirkpatrick	Democratic	2008; 2010 (defeated); 2012	Incumbent re-elected.	▌ ✓ Ann Kirkpatrick (Democratic) 52.6%; ▌Andy Tobin (Republican) 47.4%
Arizona 2	R+3	Ron Barber	Democratic	2012 (special)	Incumbent lost re-election. Republican gain.	▌ ✓ Martha McSally (Republican) 50.04%; ▌Ron Barber (Democratic) 49.96%
Arizona 3	D+8	Raúl Grijalva	Democratic	2002	Incumbent re-elected.	▌ ✓ Raúl Grijalva (Democratic) 55.7%; ▌Gabby Saucedo Mercer (Republican) 44.3%
Arizona 4	R+20	Paul Gosar	Republican	2010	Incumbent re-elected.	▌ ✓ Paul Gosar (Republican) 70.0%; ▌Mikel Weisser (Democratic) 25.8%; ▌Chris Rike (Libertarian) 4.2%
Arizona 5	R+17	Matt Salmon	Republican	1994; 2000 (retired); 2012	Incumbent re-elected.	▌ ✓ Matt Salmon (Republican) 69.6%; ▌James Woods (Democratic) 30.4%
Arizona 6	R+12	David Schweikert	Republican	2010	Incumbent re-elected.	▌ ✓ David Schweikert (Republican) 64.9%; ▌John Williamson (Democratic) 35.1%
Arizona 7	D+16	Ed Pastor	Democratic	1991 (special)	Incumbent retired. Democratic hold.	▌ ✓ Ruben Gallego (Democratic) 74.3%; ▌Joe Cobb (Libertarian) 16.0%; ▌Rebecca DeWitt (Americans Elect) 5.7%; ▌José Peñalosa (Independent) 4.0%
Arizona 8	R+15	Trent Franks	Republican	2002	Incumbent re-elected.	▌ ✓ Trent Franks (Republican) 75.8%; ▌Stephen Dolgos (Americans Elect) 24.2%
Arizona 9	R+1	Kyrsten Sinema	Democratic	2012	Incumbent re-elected.	▌ ✓ Kyrsten Sinema (Democratic) 54.7%; ▌Wendy Rogers (Republican) 41.8%; ▌Powell Gammill (Libertarian) 3.5%

== Arkansas ==
District		Incumbent			This race	
Location	PVI	Representative	Party	First elected	Status	Candidates
Arkansas 1	R+14	Rick Crawford	Republican	2010	Incumbent re-elected.	▌ ✓ Rick Crawford (Republican) 63.3%; ▌Jackie McPherson (Democratic) 32.4%; ▌Brian Willhite (Libertarian) 4.4%
Arkansas 2	R+8	Tim Griffin	Republican	2010	Incumbent retired to run for Lieutenant Governor of Arkansas. Republican hold.	▌ ✓ French Hill (Republican) 51.9%; ▌Pat Hays (Democratic) 43.6%; ▌Debbie Standiford (Libertarian) 4.5%
Arkansas 3	R+19	Steve Womack	Republican	2010	Incumbent re-elected.	▌ ✓ Steve Womack (Republican) 79.4%; ▌Grant Brand (Libertarian) 20.6%
Arkansas 4	R+15	Tom Cotton	Republican	2012	Incumbent retired to run for U.S. senator. Republican hold.	▌ ✓ Bruce Westerman (Republican) 53.8%; ▌James Lee Witt (Democratic) 42.6%; ▌Ken Hamilton (Libertarian) 3.7%

== California ==
District		Incumbent			This race	
Location	PVI	Representative	Party	First elected	Status	Candidates
California 1	R+10	Doug LaMalfa	Republican	2012	Incumbent re-elected.	▌ ✓ Doug LaMalfa (Republican) 61.0%; ▌Heidi Hall (Democratic) 39.0%
California 2	D+20	Jared Huffman	Democratic	2012	Incumbent re-elected.	▌ ✓ Jared Huffman (Democratic) 75.0%; ▌Dale Mensing (Republican) 25.0%
California 3	D+3	John Garamendi	Democratic	2009 (special)	Incumbent re-elected.	▌ ✓ John Garamendi (Democratic) 52.7%; ▌Dan Logue (Republican) 47.3%
California 4	R+10	Tom McClintock	Republican	2008	Incumbent re-elected.	▌ ✓ Tom McClintock (Republican) 60.0%; ▌Art Moore (Republican) 40.0%
California 5	D+19	Mike Thompson	Democratic	1998	Incumbent re-elected.	▌ ✓ Mike Thompson (Democratic) 75.8%; ▌James Hinton (Independent) 24.2%
California 6	D+18	Doris Matsui	Democratic	2005 (special)	Incumbent re-elected.	▌ ✓ Doris Matsui (Democratic) 72.7%; ▌Joseph McCray Sr. (Republican) 27.3%
California 7	EVEN	Ami Bera	Democratic	2012	Incumbent re-elected.	▌ ✓ Ami Bera (Democratic) 50.4%; ▌Doug Ose (Republican) 49.6%
California 8	R+10	Paul Cook	Republican	2012	Incumbent re-elected.	▌ ✓ Paul Cook (Republican) 67.7%; ▌Robert Conaway (Democratic) 32.3%
California 9	D+6	Jerry McNerney	Democratic	2006	Incumbent re-elected.	▌ ✓ Jerry McNerney (Democratic) 52.4%; ▌Tony Amador (Republican) 47.6%
California 10	R+1	Jeff Denham	Republican	2010	Incumbent re-elected.	▌ ✓ Jeff Denham (Republican) 56.1%; ▌Michael Eggman (Democratic) 43.9%
California 11	D+17	George Miller	Democratic	1974	Incumbent retired. Democratic hold.	▌ ✓ Mark DeSaulnier (Democratic) 67.3%; ▌Tue Phan (Republican) 32.7%
California 12	D+34	Nancy Pelosi	Democratic	1987 (special)	Incumbent re-elected.	▌ ✓ Nancy Pelosi (Democratic) 83.3%; ▌John Dennis (Republican) 16.7%
California 13	D+37	Barbara Lee	Democratic	1998 (special)	Incumbent re-elected.	▌ ✓ Barbara Lee (Democratic) 88.5%; ▌Dakin Sundeen (Republican) 11.5%
California 14	D+23	Jackie Speier	Democratic	2008 (special)	Incumbent re-elected.	▌ ✓ Jackie Speier (Democratic) 76.7%; ▌Robin Chew (Republican) 23.3%
California 15	D+16	Eric Swalwell	Democratic	2012	Incumbent re-elected.	▌ ✓ Eric Swalwell (Democratic) 69.8%; ▌Hugh Bussell (Republican) 30.2%
California 16	D+7	Jim Costa	Democratic	2004	Incumbent re-elected.	▌ ✓ Jim Costa (Democratic) 50.7%; ▌Johnny Tacherra (Republican) 49.3%
California 17	D+20	Mike Honda	Democratic	2000	Incumbent re-elected.	▌ ✓ Mike Honda (Democratic) 51.8%; ▌Ro Khanna (Democratic) 48.2%
California 18	D+18	Anna Eshoo	Democratic	1992	Incumbent re-elected.	▌ ✓ Anna Eshoo (Democratic) 67.8%; ▌Richard B. Fox (Republican) 32.2%
California 19	D+19	Zoe Lofgren	Democratic	1994	Incumbent re-elected.	▌ ✓ Zoe Lofgren (Democratic) 67.2%; ▌Robert Murray (Democratic) 32.8%
California 20	D+21	Sam Farr	Democratic	1993 (special)	Incumbent re-elected.	▌ ✓ Sam Farr (Democratic) 75.2%; ▌Ronald P. Kabat (Independent) 24.8%
California 21	D+2	David Valadao	Republican	2012	Incumbent re-elected.	▌ ✓ David Valadao (Republican) 57.8%; ▌Amanda Renteria (Democratic) 42.2%
California 22	R+10	Devin Nunes	Republican	2002	Incumbent re-elected.	▌ ✓ Devin Nunes (Republican) 72.0%; ▌Sam Aguilera-Marrero (Democratic) 28.0%
California 23	R+16	Kevin McCarthy	Republican	2006	Incumbent re-elected.	▌ ✓ Kevin McCarthy (Republican) 74.8%; ▌Raul Garcia (Democratic) 25.2%
California 24	D+4	Lois Capps	Democratic	1998 (special)	Incumbent re-elected.	▌ ✓ Lois Capps (Democratic) 51.9%; ▌Chris Mitchum (Republican) 48.1%
California 25	R+3	Howard McKeon	Republican	1992	Incumbent retired. Republican hold.	▌ ✓ Steve Knight (Republican) 53.3%; ▌Tony Strickland (Republican) 46.7%
California 26	D+4	Julia Brownley	Democratic	2012	Incumbent re-elected.	▌ ✓ Julia Brownley (Democratic) 51.3%; ▌Jeff Gorell (Republican) 48.7%
California 27	D+11	Judy Chu	Democratic	2009 (special)	Incumbent re-elected.	▌ ✓ Judy Chu (Democratic) 59.4%; ▌Jack Orswell (Republican) 40.6%
California 28	D+20	Adam Schiff	Democratic	2000	Incumbent re-elected.	▌ ✓ Adam Schiff (Democratic) 76.5%; ▌Steve Stokes (Independent) 23.5%
California 29	D+25	Tony Cárdenas	Democratic	2012	Incumbent re-elected.	▌ ✓ Tony Cárdenas (Democratic) 74.6%; ▌William Leader (Republican) 25.4%
California 30	D+14	Brad Sherman	Democratic	1996	Incumbent re-elected.	▌ ✓ Brad Sherman (Democratic) 65.6%; ▌Mark Reed (Republican) 34.4%
California 31	D+5	Gary Miller	Republican	1998	Incumbent retired. Democratic gain.	▌ ✓ Pete Aguilar (Democratic) 51.7%; ▌Paul Chabot (Republican) 48.3%
California 32	D+12	Grace Napolitano	Democratic	1998	Incumbent re-elected.	▌ ✓ Grace Napolitano (Democratic) 59.7%; ▌Arturo Alas (Republican) 40.3%
California 33	D+11	Henry Waxman	Democratic	1974	Incumbent retired. Democratic hold.	▌ ✓ Ted Lieu (Democratic) 59.2%; ▌Elan Carr (Republican) 40.8%
California 34	D+30	Xavier Becerra	Democratic	1992	Incumbent re-elected.	▌ ✓ Xavier Becerra (Democratic) 72.5%; ▌Adrienne Edwards (Democratic) 27.5%
California 35	D+15	Gloria Negrete McLeod	Democratic	2012	Incumbent retired to run for the San Bernardino County Board of Supervisors; Democratic hold.	▌ ✓ Norma Torres (Democratic) 63.5%; ▌Christina Gagnier (Democratic) 36.5%
California 36	R+1	Raul Ruiz	Democratic	2012	Incumbent re-elected.	▌ ✓ Raul Ruiz (Democratic) 54.2%; ▌Brian Nestande (Republican) 45.8%
California 37	D+34	Karen Bass	Democratic	2010	Incumbent re-elected.	▌ ✓ Karen Bass (Democratic) 84.3%; ▌R. Adam King (Republican) 15.7%
California 38	D+12	Linda Sánchez	Democratic	2002	Incumbent re-elected.	▌ ✓ Linda Sánchez (Democratic) 59.1%; ▌Benjamin Campos (Republican) 40.9%
California 39	R+5	Ed Royce	Republican	1992	Incumbent re-elected.	▌ ✓ Ed Royce (Republican) 68.5%; ▌Peter Anderson (Democratic) 31.5%
California 40	D+29	Lucille Roybal-Allard	Democratic	1992	Incumbent re-elected.	▌ ✓ Lucille Roybal-Allard (Democratic) 61.2%; ▌David Sanchez (Democratic) 38.8%
California 41	D+9	Mark Takano	Democratic	2012	Incumbent re-elected.	▌ ✓ Mark Takano (Democratic) 56.6%; ▌Steve Adams (Republican) 43.4%
California 42	R+10	Ken Calvert	Republican	1992	Incumbent re-elected.	▌ ✓ Ken Calvert (Republican) 65.7%; ▌Tim Sheridan (Democratic) 34.3%
California 43	D+26	Maxine Waters	Democratic	1990	Incumbent re-elected.	▌ ✓ Maxine Waters (Democratic) 71.0%
California 44	D+32	Janice Hahn	Democratic	2011 (special)	Incumbent re-elected.	▌ ✓ Janice Hahn (Democratic) 86.7%; Adam Shbeita (Peace & Freedom) 13.3%
California 45	R+7	John B. T. Campbell III	Republican	2005 (special)	Incumbent retired. Republican hold.	▌ ✓ Mimi Walters (Republican) 65.1%; ▌Drew Leavens (Democratic) 34.9%
California 46	D+9	Loretta Sanchez	Democratic	1996	Incumbent re-elected.	▌ ✓ Loretta Sanchez (Democratic) 59.7%; ▌Adam Nick (Republican) 40.3%
California 47	D+8	Alan Lowenthal	Democratic	2012	Incumbent re-elected.	▌ ✓ Alan Lowenthal (Democratic) 56.0%; ▌Andy Whallon (Republican) 44.0%
California 48	R+7	Dana Rohrabacher	Republican	1988	Incumbent re-elected	▌ ✓ Dana Rohrabacher (Republican) 64.1%; ▌Suzanne Savary (Democratic) 35.9%
California 49	R+4	Darrell Issa	Republican	2000	Incumbent re-elected.	▌ ✓ Darrell Issa (Republican) 60.2%; ▌Dave Peiser (Democratic) 39.8%
California 50	R+14	Duncan D. Hunter	Republican	2008	Incumbent re-elected.	▌ ✓ Duncan D. Hunter (Republican) 71.2%; ▌James Kimber (Democratic) 28.8%
California 51	D+16	Juan Vargas	Democratic	2012	Incumbent re-elected.	▌ ✓ Juan Vargas (Democratic) 68.8%; ▌Stephen Meade (Republican) 31.2%
California 52	D+2	Scott Peters	Democratic	2012	Incumbent re-elected.	▌ ✓ Scott Peters (Democratic) 51.6%; ▌Carl DeMaio (Republican) 48.4%
California 53	D+10	Susan Davis	Democratic	2000	Incumbent re-elected.	▌ ✓ Susan Davis (Democratic) 58.8%; ▌Larry Wilske (Republican) 41.2%

== Colorado ==
District		Incumbent			This race	
Location	PVI	Representative	Party	First elected	Status	Candidates
Colorado 1	D+18	Diana DeGette	Democratic	1996	Incumbent re-elected.	▌ ✓ Diana DeGette (Democratic) 65.8%; ▌Martin Walsh (Republican) 29.0%; ▌Frank Atwood (Libertarian) 3.3%
Colorado 2	D+8	Jared Polis	Democratic	2008	Incumbent re-elected.	▌ ✓ Jared Polis (Democratic) 56.7%; ▌George Leing (Republican) 43.3%
Colorado 3	R+5	Scott Tipton	Republican	2010	Incumbent re-elected.	▌ ✓ Scott Tipton (Republican) 58.0%; ▌Abel Tapia (Democratic) 35.7%; ▌Tisha Casida (Independent) 4.0%; ▌Travis Mero (Libertarian) 2.3%
Colorado 4	R+11	Cory Gardner	Republican	2010	Incumbent retired to run for U.S. senator. Republican hold.	▌ ✓ Ken Buck (Republican) 64.7%; ▌Vic Meyers (Democratic) 29.2%; ▌Jess Loban (Libertarian) 3.3%
Colorado 5	R+13	Doug Lamborn	Republican	2006	Incumbent re-elected.	▌ ✓ Doug Lamborn (Republican) 59.8%; ▌Irv Halter (Democratic) 40.2%
Colorado 6	D+1	Mike Coffman	Republican	2008	Incumbent re-elected.	▌ ✓ Mike Coffman (Republican) 51.9%; ▌Andrew Romanoff (Democratic) 43.0%; ▌Norm Olsen (Libertarian) 3.1%; ▌Gary Swing (Green) 2.0%
Colorado 7	D+5	Ed Perlmutter	Democratic	2006	Incumbent re-elected.	▌ ✓ Ed Perlmutter (Democratic) 55.1%; ▌Don Ytterberg (Republican) 44.9%

== Connecticut ==
District		Incumbent			This race	
Location	PVI	Representative	Party	First elected	Status	Candidates
Connecticut 1	D+13	John B. Larson	Democratic	1998	Incumbent re-elected.	▌ ✓ John Larson (Democratic) 62.3%; ▌Matthew Corey (Republican) 36.1%; ▌Jeff Russell (Green) 1.6%
Connecticut 2	D+5	Joe Courtney	Democratic	2006	Incumbent re-elected.	▌ ✓ Joe Courtney (Democratic) 62.3%; ▌Lori Hopkins-Cavanagh (Republican) 35.5%; ▌Dan Reale (Libertarian) 1.1%; ▌William Clyde (Green) 1.1%
Connecticut 3	D+11	Rosa DeLauro	Democratic	1990	Incumbent re-elected.	▌ ✓ Rosa DeLauro (Democratic) 67.1%; ▌James Brown (Republican) 32.9%
Connecticut 4	D+5	Jim Himes	Democratic	2008	Incumbent re-elected.	▌ ✓ Jim Himes (Democratic) 53.7%; ▌Dan Debicella (Republican) 46.3%
Connecticut 5	D+3	Elizabeth Esty	Democratic	2012	Incumbent re-elected.	▌ ✓ Elizabeth Esty (Democratic) 53.3%; ▌Mark Greenberg (Republican) 45.8%; ▌John J. Pistone (Independent) 0.9%

== Delaware ==
District		Incumbent			This race	
Location	PVI	Incumbent	Party	First elected	Result	Candidates
Delaware at-large	D+8	John Carney	Democratic	2010	Incumbent re-elected.	▌ ✓ John Carney (Democratic) 59.3%; ▌Rose Izzo (Republican) 36.8%; ▌Bernard August (Green) 2.1%; ▌Scott Gesty (Libertarian) 1.9%

== Florida ==
District		Incumbent			This race	
Location	PVI	Incumbent	Party	First elected	Result	Candidates
Florida 1	R+21	Jeff Miller	Republican	2001 (special)	Incumbent re-elected.	▌ ✓ Jeff Miller (Republican) 70.2%; ▌Jim Bryan (Democratic) 23.4%; ▌Mark Wichern (Independent) 6.5%
Florida 2	R+6	Steve Southerland	Republican	2010	Incumbent lost re-election. Democratic gain.	▌ ✓ Gwen Graham (Democratic) 50.5%; ▌Steve Southerland (Republican) 49.3%
Florida 3	R+12	Ted Yoho	Republican	2012	Incumbent re-elected.	▌ ✓ Ted Yoho (Republican) 65.0%; ▌Marihelen Wheeler (Democratic) 32.3%; ▌Howard Term Limits Lawson (Independent) 2.7%
Florida 4	R+17	Ander Crenshaw	Republican	2000	Incumbent re-elected.	▌ ✓ Ander Crenshaw (Republican) 78.3%; ▌Paula Moser-Bartlett (Independent) 15.7%; ▌Gary Koniz (Independent) 6.0%
Florida 5	D+16	Corrine Brown	Democratic	1992	Incumbent re-elected.	▌ ✓ Corrine Brown (Democratic) 65.5%; ▌Glo Scurry-Smith (Republican) 34.5%
Florida 6	R+8	Ron DeSantis	Republican	2012	Incumbent re-elected.	▌ ✓ Ron DeSantis (Republican) 62.5%; ▌David Cox (Democratic) 37.5%
Florida 7	R+4	John Mica	Republican	1992	Incumbent re-elected.	▌ ✓ John Mica (Republican) 63.6%; ▌Wes Neuman (Democratic) 32.1%; ▌Al Krulick (Independent) 4.3%
Florida 8	R+8	Bill Posey	Republican	2008	Incumbent re-elected.	▌ ✓ Bill Posey (Republican) 65.9%; ▌Gabriel Rothblatt (Democratic) 34.1%
Florida 9	D+4	Alan Grayson	Democratic	2008; 2010 (defeated); 2012	Incumbent re-elected.	▌ ✓ Alan Grayson (Democratic) 54.0%; ▌Carol Platt (Republican) 43.1%; ▌Marko Milakovich (Independent) 2.9%
Florida 10	R+7	Daniel Webster	Republican	2010	Incumbent re-elected.	▌ ✓ Daniel Webster (Republican) 61.5%; ▌Michael McKenna (Democratic) 38.5%
Florida 11	R+8	Rich Nugent	Republican	2010	Incumbent re-elected.	▌ ✓ Rich Nugent (Republican) 66.7%; ▌Dave Koller (Democratic) 33.3%
Florida 12	R+6	Gus Bilirakis	Republican	2006	Incumbent re-elected.	▌ ✓ Gus Bilirakis (Republican) 100%
Florida 13	R+1	David Jolly	Republican	2014 (special)	Incumbent re-elected.	▌ ✓ David Jolly (Republican) 75.2%; ▌Lucas Overby (Libertarian) 24.8%
Florida 14	D+11	Kathy Castor	Democratic	2006	Incumbent re-elected.	▌ ✓ Kathy Castor (Democratic) 100%
Florida 15	R+6	Dennis A. Ross	Republican	2010	Incumbent re-elected.	▌ ✓ Dennis A. Ross (Republican) 60.3%; ▌Alan Cohn (Democratic) 39.7%
Florida 16	R+5	Vern Buchanan	Republican	2006	Incumbent re-elected.	▌ ✓ Vern Buchanan (Republican) 61.6%; ▌Henry Lawrence (Democratic) 38.4%
Florida 17	R+10	Tom Rooney	Republican	2008	Incumbent re-elected.	▌ ✓ Tom Rooney (Republican) 63.2%; ▌Will Bronson (Democratic) 36.8%
Florida 18	R+3	Patrick Murphy	Democratic	2012	Incumbent re-elected.	▌ ✓ Patrick Murphy (Democratic) 59.8%; ▌Carl Domino (Republican) 40.2%
Florida 19	R+11	Curt Clawson	Republican	2014 (special)	Incumbent re-elected.	▌ ✓ Curt Clawson (Republican) 64.6%; ▌April Freeman (Democratic) 32.7%; ▌Ray Netherwood (Libertarian) 2.7%
Florida 20	D+28	Alcee Hastings	Democratic	1992	Incumbent re-elected.	▌ ✓ Alcee Hastings (Democratic) 81.6%; ▌Jay Bonner (Republican) 18.4%
Florida 21	D+12	Ted Deutch	Democratic	2010 (special)	Incumbent re-elected.	▌ ✓ Ted Deutch (Democratic) 100%
Florida 22	D+4	Lois Frankel	Democratic	2012	Incumbent re-elected.	▌ ✓ Lois Frankel (Democratic) 58.0%; ▌Paul Spain (Republican) 42.0%
Florida 23	D+11	Debbie Wasserman Schultz	Democratic	2004	Incumbent re-elected.	▌ ✓ Debbie Wasserman Schultz (Democratic) 62.7%; ▌Joe Kaufman (Republican) 37.3%
Florida 24	D+33	Frederica Wilson	Democratic	2010	Incumbent re-elected.	▌ ✓ Frederica Wilson (Democratic) 86.2%; ▌Dufirstson Neree (Republican) 10.2%; ▌Luis Fernandez (Independent) 3.7%
Florida 25	R+6	Mario Díaz-Balart	Republican	2002	Incumbent re-elected.	▌ ✓ Mario Díaz-Balart (Republican) 100%
Florida 26	R+4	Joe Garcia	Democratic	2012	Incumbent lost re-election. Republican gain.	▌ ✓ Carlos Curbelo (Republican) 51.5%; ▌Joe Garcia (Democratic) 48.5%
Florida 27	R+2	Ileana Ros-Lehtinen	Republican	1989 (special)	Incumbent re-elected.	▌ ✓ Ileana Ros-Lehtinen (Republican) 100%

== Georgia ==
District		Incumbent			This race	
Location	PVI	Incumbent	Party	First elected	Result	Candidates
Georgia 1	R+9	Jack Kingston	Republican	1992	Incumbent retired to run for U.S. senator. Republican hold.	▌ ✓ Buddy Carter (Republican) 60.9%; ▌Brian Reese (Democratic) 39.1%
Georgia 2	D+6	Sanford Bishop	Democratic	1992	Incumbent re-elected.	▌ ✓ Sanford Bishop (Democratic) 59.1%; ▌Greg Duke (Republican) 40.9%
Georgia 3	R+19	Lynn Westmoreland	Republican	2004	Incumbent re-elected.	▌ ✓ Lynn Westmoreland (Republican) 100%
Georgia 4	D+21	Hank Johnson	Democratic	2006	Incumbent re-elected.	▌ ✓ Hank Johnson (Democratic) 99.9%
Georgia 5	D+32	John Lewis	Democratic	1986	Incumbent re-elected.	▌ ✓ John Lewis (Democratic) 100%
Georgia 6	R+14	Tom Price	Republican	2004	Incumbent re-elected.	▌ ✓ Tom Price (Republican) 66.0%; ▌Bob Montigel (Democratic) 34.0%
Georgia 7	R+14	Rob Woodall	Republican	2010	Incumbent re-elected.	▌ ✓ Rob Woodall (Republican) 65.4%; ▌Thomas Wight (Democratic) 34.6%
Georgia 8	R+15	Austin Scott	Republican	2010	Incumbent re-elected.	▌ ✓ Austin Scott (Republican) 99.9%
Georgia 9	R+30	Doug Collins	Republican	2012	Incumbent re-elected.	▌ ✓ Doug Collins (Republican) 80.7%; ▌David Vogel (Democratic) 19.3%
Georgia 10	R+14	Paul Broun	Republican	2007 (special)	Incumbent retired to run for U.S. senator. Republican hold.	▌ ✓ Jody Hice (Republican) 66.5%; ▌Ken Dious (Democratic) 33.5%
Georgia 11	R+19	Phil Gingrey	Republican	2002	Incumbent retired to run for U.S. senator. Republican hold.	▌ ✓ Barry Loudermilk (Republican) 100%
Georgia 12	R+9	John Barrow	Democratic	2004	Incumbent lost re-election. Republican gain.	▌ ✓ Rick Allen (Republican) 54.8%; ▌John Barrow (Democratic) 45.2%
Georgia 13	D+16	David Scott	Democratic	2002	Incumbent re-elected.	▌ ✓ David Scott (Democratic) 100%
Georgia 14	R+26	Tom Graves	Republican	2010 (special)	Incumbent re-elected.	▌ ✓ Tom Graves (Republican) 100%

== Hawaii ==
District		Incumbent			This race	
Location	PVI	Incumbent	Party	First elected	Result	Candidates
Hawaii 1	D+18	Colleen Hanabusa	Democratic	2010	Incumbent retired to run for U.S. senator. Democratic hold.	▌ ✓ Mark Takai (Democratic) 51.9%; ▌Charles Djou (Republican) 48.1%
Hawaii 2	D+21	Tulsi Gabbard	Democratic	2012	Incumbent re-elected.	▌ ✓ Tulsi Gabbard (Democratic) 78.8%; ▌Kawika Crowley (Republican) 18.7%; ▌Joe Kent (Libertarian) 2.5%

== Idaho ==
District		Incumbent			This race	
Location	PVI	Incumbent	Party	First elected	Result	Candidates
Idaho 1	R+18	Raúl Labrador	Republican	2010	Incumbent re-elected.	▌ ✓ Raúl Labrador (Republican) 65.0%; ▌Shirley Ringo (Democratic) 35.0%
Idaho 2	R+17	Mike Simpson	Republican	1998	Incumbent re-elected.	▌ ✓ Mike Simpson (Republican) 61.4%; ▌Richard H. Stallings (Democratic) 38.6%

== Illinois ==
District		Incumbent			This race	
Location	PVI	Incumbent	Party	First elected	Result	Candidates
Illinois 1	D+28	Bobby Rush	Democratic	1992	Incumbent re-elected.	▌ ✓ Bobby Rush (Democratic) 73.1%; ▌Jimmy Lee Tillman (Republican) 26.9%
Illinois 2	D+29	Robin Kelly	Democratic	2013 (special)	Incumbent re-elected.	▌ ✓ Robin Kelly (Democratic) 78.5%; ▌Eric Wallace (Republican) 21.5%
Illinois 3	D+5	Dan Lipinski	Democratic	2004	Incumbent re-elected.	▌ ✓ Dan Lipinski (Democratic) 64.6%; ▌Sharon Brannigan (Republican) 35.4%
Illinois 4	D+29	Luis Gutiérrez	Democratic	1992	Incumbent re-elected.	▌ ✓ Luis Gutiérrez (Democratic) 78%; ▌Hector Concepcion (Republican) 22%
Illinois 5	D+16	Mike Quigley	Democratic	2008	Incumbent re-elected.	▌ ✓ Mike Quigley (Democratic) 63.2%; ▌Vince Kolber (Republican) 30.6%; ▌Nancy Wade (Green) 6.1%
Illinois 6	R+4	Peter Roskam	Republican	2006	Incumbent re-elected.	▌ ✓ Peter Roskam (Republican) 67.1%; ▌Michael Mason (Democratic) 32.9%
Illinois 7	D+36	Danny Davis	Democratic	1996	Incumbent re-elected.	▌ ✓ Danny Davis (Democratic) 85.0%; ▌Robert Bumpers (Republican) 15.0%
Illinois 8	D+8	Tammy Duckworth	Democratic	2012	Incumbent re-elected.	▌ ✓ Tammy Duckworth (Democratic) 55.7%; ▌Larry Kaifesh (Republican) 44.3%
Illinois 9	D+15	Jan Schakowsky	Democratic	1998	Incumbent re-elected.	▌ ✓ Jan Schakowsky (Democratic) 66.1%; ▌Susanne Atanus (Republican) 33.9%
Illinois 10	D+8	Brad Schneider	Democratic	2012	Incumbent lost re-election. Republican gain.	▌ ✓ Bob Dold (Republican) 51.3%; ▌Brad Schneider (Democratic) 48.7%
Illinois 11	D+8	Bill Foster	Democratic	2008 (special); 2010 (defeated); 2012	Incumbent re-elected.	▌ ✓ Bill Foster (Democratic) 53.5%; ▌Darlene Senger (Republican) 46.5%
Illinois 12	EVEN	William Enyart	Democratic	2012	Incumbent lost re-election. Republican gain.	▌ ✓ Mike Bost (Republican) 52.5%; ▌Bill Enyart (Democratic) 41.9%; ▌Paula Bradshaw (Green) 5.7%
Illinois 13	EVEN	Rodney L. Davis	Republican	2012	Incumbent re-elected.	▌ ✓ Rodney L. Davis (Republican) 58.7%; ▌Ann Callis (Democratic) 41.3%
Illinois 14	R+5	Randy Hultgren	Republican	2010	Incumbent re-elected.	▌ ✓ Randy Hultgren (Republican) 65.4%; ▌Dennis Anderson (Democratic) 34.6%
Illinois 15	R+14	John Shimkus	Republican	1996	Incumbent re-elected.	▌ ✓ John Shimkus (Republican) 75%; ▌Eric Thorsland (Democratic) 25%
Illinois 16	R+4	Adam Kinzinger	Republican	2010	Incumbent re-elected.	▌ ✓ Adam Kinzinger (Republican) 70.6%; ▌Randall Olsen (Democratic) 29.4%
Illinois 17	D+7	Cheri Bustos	Democratic	2012	Incumbent re-elected.	▌ ✓ Cheri Bustos (Democratic) 55.5%; ▌Bobby Schilling (Republican) 44.5%
Illinois 18	R+11	Aaron Schock	Republican	2008	Incumbent re-elected.	▌ ✓ Aaron Schock (Republican) 74.7%; ▌Darrel Miller (Democratic) 25.3%

== Indiana ==
District		Incumbent			This race	
Location	PVI	Representative	Party	First elected	Status	Candidates
Indiana 1	D+10	Pete Visclosky	Democratic	1984	Incumbent re-elected.	▌ ✓ Pete Visclosky (Democratic) 60.9%; ▌Mark Leyva (Republican) 35.8%; ▌Donna Dunn (Libertarian) 3.3%
Indiana 2	R+6	Jackie Walorski	Republican	2012	Incumbent re-elected.	▌ ✓ Jackie Walorski (Republican) 58.9%; ▌Joe Bock (Democratic) 38.3%; ▌Jeff Petermann (Libertarian) 2.8%
Indiana 3	R+13	Marlin Stutzman	Republican	2010	Incumbent re-elected.	▌ ✓ Marlin Stutzman (Republican) 65.8%; ▌Justin Kuhnle (Democratic) 26.7%; ▌Scott Wise (Libertarian) 7.5%
Indiana 4	R+11	Todd Rokita	Republican	2010	Incumbent re-elected.	▌ ✓ Todd Rokita (Republican) 66.9%; ▌John Dale (Democratic) 33.1%
Indiana 5	R+9	Susan Brooks	Republican	2012	Incumbent re-elected.	▌ ✓ Susan Brooks (Republican) 65.2%; ▌Shawn Denney (Democratic) 30.8%; ▌John Krom (Libertarian) 4.0%
Indiana 6	R+12	Luke Messer	Republican	2012	Incumbent re-elected.	▌ ✓ Luke Messer (Republican) 65.9%; ▌Susan Hall Heitzman (Democratic) 29.4%; ▌Eric Miller (Libertarian) 4.8%
Indiana 7	D+13	André Carson	Democratic	2008 (special)	Incumbent re-elected.	▌ ✓ André Carson (Democratic) 54.7%; ▌Catherine Ping (Republican) 41.8%; ▌Chris Mayo (Libertarian) 3.5%
Indiana 8	R+8	Larry Bucshon	Republican	2010	Incumbent re-elected.	▌ ✓ Larry Bucshon (Republican) 60.3%; ▌Tom Spangler (Democratic) 35.8%; ▌Andrew Horning (Libertarian) 3.8%
Indiana 9	R+9	Todd Young	Republican	2010	Incumbent re-elected.	▌ ✓ Todd Young (Republican) 62.2%; ▌Bill Bailey (Democratic) 33.7%; ▌Mike Frey (Libertarian) 4.1%

== Iowa ==
District		Incumbent			This race	
Location	PVI	Incumbent	Party	First elected	Result	Candidates
Iowa 1	D+5	Bruce Braley	Democratic	2006	Incumbent retired to run for U.S. senator. Republican gain.	▌ ✓ Rod Blum (Republican) 51.1%; ▌Pat Murphy (Democratic) 48.8%
Iowa 2	D+4	Dave Loebsack	Democratic	2006	Incumbent re-elected.	▌ ✓ Dave Loebsack (Democratic) 52.4%; ▌Mariannette Miller-Meeks (Republican) 47.5%
Iowa 3	EVEN	Tom Latham	Republican	1994	Incumbent retired. Republican hold.	▌ ✓ David Young (Republican) 52.8%; ▌Staci Appel (Democratic) 42.2%; ▌Edward Wright (Libertarian) 3.2%; ▌Bryan Holder (Independent) 1.5%
Iowa 4	R+5	Steve King	Republican	2002	Incumbent re-elected.	▌ ✓ Steve King (Republican) 61.6%; ▌Jim Mowrer (Democratic) 38.3%

== Kansas ==
District		Incumbent			This race	
Location	PVI	Incumbent	Party	First elected	Result	Candidates
Kansas 1	R+23	Tim Huelskamp	Republican	2010	Incumbent re-elected.	▌ ✓ Tim Huelskamp (Republican) 67.5%; ▌Jim Sherow (Democratic) 32.5%
Kansas 2	R+8	Lynn Jenkins	Republican	2008	Incumbent re-elected.	▌ ✓ Lynn Jenkins (Republican) 57.2%; ▌Margie Wakefield (Democratic) 38.5%; ▌Chris Clemmons (Libertarian) 4.3%
Kansas 3	R+6	Kevin Yoder	Republican	2010	Incumbent re-elected.	▌ ✓ Kevin Yoder (Republican) 60.0%; ▌Kelly Kultala (Democratic) 40.0%
Kansas 4	R+14	Mike Pompeo	Republican	2010	Incumbent re-elected.	▌ ✓ Mike Pompeo (Republican) 66.8%; ▌Perry Schuckman (Democratic) 33.2%

== Kentucky ==
District		Incumbent			This race	
Location	PVI	Incumbent	Party	First elected	Result	Candidates
Kentucky 1	R+18	Ed Whitfield	Republican	1994	Incumbent re-elected.	▌ ✓ Ed Whitfield (Republican) 73.1%; ▌Charles Hatchett (Democratic) 26.9%
Kentucky 2	R+16	Brett Guthrie	Republican	2008	Incumbent re-elected.	▌ ✓ Brett Guthrie (Republican) 69.2%; ▌Ron Leach (Democratic) 30.8%
Kentucky 3	D+4	John Yarmuth	Democratic	2006	Incumbent re-elected.	▌ ✓ John Yarmuth (Democratic) 63.5%; ▌Michael Macfarlane (Republican) 35.6%; ▌Gregory Puccetti (Independent) 0.9%
Kentucky 4	R+16	Thomas Massie	Republican	2012	Incumbent re-elected.	▌ ✓ Thomas Massie (Republican) 67.7%; ▌Peter Newberry (Democratic) 32.3%
Kentucky 5	R+25	Hal Rogers	Republican	1980	Incumbent re-elected.	▌ ✓ Hal Rogers (Republican) 78.2%; ▌Kenneth Stepp (Democratic) 21.8%
Kentucky 6	R+9	Andy Barr	Republican	2012	Incumbent re-elected.	▌ ✓ Andy Barr (Republican) 60.0%; ▌Elisabeth Jensen (Democratic) 40.0%

== Louisiana ==
District		Incumbent			This race	
Location	PVI	Representative	Party	First elected	Status	Candidates
Louisiana 1	R+26	Steve Scalise	Republican	2008 (special)	Incumbent re-elected.	▌ ✓ Steve Scalise (Republican) 77.5%; ▌Vinny Mendoza (Democratic) 10.2%; ▌Lee Dugas (Democratic) 8.7%; ▌Jeff Sanford (Libertarian) 3.6%
Louisiana 2	D+23	Cedric Richmond	Democratic	2010	Incumbent re-elected.	▌ ✓ Cedric Richmond (Democratic) 68.7%; ▌Gary Landrieu (Democratic) 17.1%; ▌David Brooks (Independent) 7.4%; ▌Samuel Davenport (Libertarian) 6.9%
Louisiana 3	R+19	Charles Boustany	Republican	2004	Incumbent re-elected.	▌ ✓ Charles Boustany (Republican) 78.7%; ▌Russell Richard (Independent) 12.0%; ▌Bryan Barrilleaux (Republican) 9.3%
Louisiana 4	R+13	John Fleming	Republican	2008	Incumbent re-elected.	▌ ✓ John Fleming (Republican) 73.4%; ▌Randall Lord (Libertarian) 26.6%
Louisiana 5	R+15	Vance McAllister	Republican	2013 (special)	Incumbent lost renomination. Republican hold.	General election: ▌ Jamie Mayo (Democratic) 28.2%; ▌ Ralph Abraham (Republican) 23.2%; ▌Zach Dasher (Republican) 22.4%; ▌Vance McAllister (Republican) 11.1%; ▌Clyde Holloway (Republican) 7.5%; ▌Harris Brown (Republican) 4.1%; ▌Ed Tarpley (Republican) 1.9%; ▌Charles Saucier (Libertarian) 0.9%; ▌Eliot Barron (Green) 0.7%; Runoff: ▌ ✓ Ralph Abraham (Republican) 64.2%; ▌Jamie Mayo (Democratic) 35.8%
Louisiana 6	R+21	Bill Cassidy	Republican	2008	Incumbent retired to run for U.S. senator. Republican hold.	General election: ▌ Edwin Edwards (Democratic) 30.1%; ▌ Garret Graves (Republican) 27.4%; ▌Paul Dietzel (Republican) 13.5%; ▌Dan Claitor (Republican) 10.3%; ▌Lenar Whitney (Republican) 7.4%; ▌Richard Lieberman (Democratic) 2.8%; ▌Craig McCulloch (Republican) 2.2%; ▌Bob Bell (Republican) 2.0%; ▌Peter Williams (Democratic) 1.6%; ▌Rufus Craig (Libertarian) 1.4%; ▌Norm Clark (Republican) 0.7%; ▌Trey Thomas (Republican) 0.6%; Runoff: ▌ ✓ Garret Graves (Republican) 62.5%; ▌Edwin Edwards (Democratic) 37.5%

== Maine ==
District		Incumbent			This race	
Location	PVI	Representative	Party	First elected	Status	Candidates
Maine 1	D+9	Chellie Pingree	Democratic	2008	Incumbent re-elected.	▌ ✓ Chellie Pingree (Democratic) 60.4%; ▌Isaac Misiuk (Republican) 30.7%; ▌Richard Murphy (Independent) 8.5%
Maine 2	D+2	Mike Michaud	Democratic	2002	Incumbent retired to run for Governor of Maine. Republican gain.	▌ ✓ Bruce Poliquin (Republican) 47.1%; ▌Emily Cain (Democratic) 41.8%; ▌Blaine Richardson (Independent) 10.6%

== Maryland ==
District		Incumbent			This race	
Location	PVI	Representative	Party	First elected	Status	Candidates
Maryland 1	R+14	Andrew P. Harris	Republican	2010	Incumbent re-elected.	▌ ✓ Andrew P. Harris (Republican) 70.5%; ▌Bill Tilghman (Democratic) 29.5%
Maryland 2	D+10	Dutch Ruppersberger	Democratic	2002	Incumbent re-elected.	▌ ✓ Dutch Ruppersberger (Democratic) 61.3%; ▌Dave Banach (Republican) 35.9%; ▌Ian Schlakman (Green) 2.8%
Maryland 3	D+9	John Sarbanes	Democratic	2006	Incumbent re-elected.	▌ ✓ John Sarbanes (Democratic) 59.6%; ▌Charles Long (Republican) 40.4%
Maryland 4	D+26	Donna Edwards	Democratic	2008	Incumbent re-elected.	▌ ✓ Donna Edwards (Democratic) 70.2%; ▌Nancy Hoyt (Republican) 28.3%; ▌Arvin Vohra (Libertarian) 1.5%
Maryland 5	D+14	Steny Hoyer	Democratic	1981 (special)	Incumbent re-elected.	▌ ✓ Steny Hoyer (Democratic) 64.1%; ▌Chris Chaffee (Republican) 35.9%
Maryland 6	D+4	John K. Delaney	Democratic	2012	Incumbent re-elected.	▌ ✓ John K. Delaney (Democratic) 49.7%; ▌Dan Bongino (Republican) 48.3%; ▌George Gluck (Green) 2.0%
Maryland 7	D+24	Elijah Cummings	Democratic	1996	Incumbent re-elected.	▌ ✓ Elijah Cummings (Democratic) 70.0%; ▌Corrogan Vaughn (Republican) 27.0%; ▌Scott Soffen (Libertarian) 3.0%
Maryland 8	D+11	Chris Van Hollen	Democratic	2002	Incumbent re-elected.	▌ ✓ Chris Van Hollen (Democratic) 60.9%; ▌David Wallace (Republican) 39.1%

== Massachusetts ==
District		Incumbent			This race	
Location	PVI	Representative	Party	First elected	Status	Candidates
Massachusetts 1	D+13	Richard Neal	Democratic	1988	Incumbent re-elected.	▌ ✓ Richard Neal (Democratic); Uncontested
Massachusetts 2	D+8	Jim McGovern	Democratic	1996	Incumbent re-elected.	▌ ✓ Jim McGovern (Democratic); Uncontested
Massachusetts 3	D+6	Niki Tsongas	Democratic	2007 (special)	Incumbent re-elected.	▌ ✓ Niki Tsongas (Democratic) 63.0%; ▌Roseann Wofford (Republican) 37.0%
Massachusetts 4	D+6	Joe Kennedy III	Democratic	2012	Incumbent re-elected.	▌ ✓ Joe Kennedy III (Democratic); Uncontested
Massachusetts 5	D+14	Katherine Clark	Democratic	2013 (special)	Incumbent re-elected.	▌ ✓ Katherine Clark (Democratic); Uncontested
Massachusetts 6	D+4	John F. Tierney	Democratic	1996	Incumbent lost renomination. Democratic hold.	▌ ✓ Seth Moulton (Democratic) 55.0%; ▌Richard Tisei (Republican) 41.1%; ▌Chris Stockwell (Independent) 3.9%
Massachusetts 7	D+31	Mike Capuano	Democratic	1998	Incumbent re-elected.	▌ ✓ Mike Capuano (Democratic); Uncontested
Massachusetts 8	D+6	Stephen Lynch	Democratic	2001 (special)	Incumbent re-elected.	▌ ✓ Stephen Lynch (Democratic); Uncontested
Massachusetts 9	D+5	Bill Keating	Democratic	2010	Incumbent re-elected.	▌ ✓ Bill Keating (Democratic) 55.0%; ▌John Chapman (Republican) 45.0%

== Michigan ==
District		Incumbent			This race	
Location	PVI	Representative	Party	First elected	Status	Candidates
Michigan 1	R+5	Dan Benishek	Republican	2010	Incumbent re-elected.	▌ ✓ Dan Benishek (Republican) 52.1%; ▌Jerry Cannon (Democratic) 45.3%; ▌Loel Gnadt (Libertarian) 1.5%; ▌Ellis Boal (Green) 1.1%
Michigan 2	R+7	Bill Huizenga	Republican	2010	Incumbent re-elected.	▌ ✓ Bill Huizenga (Republican) 63.6%; ▌Dean Vanderstelt (Democratic) 33.3%; ▌Ronald Welch (Libertarian) 1.8%; ▌Ronald Graeser (US Taxpayers) 1.3%
Michigan 3	R+4	Justin Amash	Republican	2010	Incumbent re-elected.	▌ ✓ Justin Amash (Republican) 57.9%; ▌Bob Goodrich (Democratic) 39.0%; ▌Tonya Duncan (Green) 3.1%
Michigan 4	R+5	David Lee Camp	Republican	1990	Incumbent retired. Republican hold.	▌ ✓ John Moolenaar (Republican) 56.5%; ▌Jeff Holmes (Democratic) 39.1%; ▌George Zimmer (US Taxpayers) 2.3%; ▌Will White (Libertarian) 2.1%
Michigan 5	D+10	Dan Kildee	Democratic	2012	Incumbent re-elected.	▌ ✓ Dan Kildee (Democratic) 66.7%; ▌Allen Hardwick (Republican) 31.2%; ▌Hal Jones (Libertarian) 2.1%
Michigan 6	R+1	Fred Upton	Republican	1986	Incumbent re-elected.	▌ ✓ Fred Upton (Republican) 55.9%; ▌Paul Clements (Democratic) 40.4%; ▌Erwin Haas (Libertarian) 2.6%; ▌John Lawrence (Green) 1.1%
Michigan 7	R+3	Tim Walberg	Republican	2006; 2008 (defeated); 2010	Incumbent re-elected.	▌ ✓ Tim Walberg (Republican) 53.5%; ▌Pam Byrnes (Democratic) 41.2%; ▌Ken Proctor (Libertarian) 2.0%; ▌David Swartout (Independent) 2.0%; ▌Rick Strawcutter (US Taxpayers) 1.4%
Michigan 8	R+2	Mike Rogers	Republican	2000	Incumbent retired. Republican hold.	▌ ✓ Mike Bishop (Republican) 54.6%; ▌Eric Schertzing (Democratic) 42.1%; ▌James Weeks (Libertarian) 1.9%; ▌Jim Casha (Green) 0.8%; ▌Jeremy Burgess (Natural Law) 0.7%
Michigan 9	D+6	Sander Levin	Democratic	1982	Incumbent re-elected.	▌ ✓ Sander Levin (Democratic) 60.4%; ▌George Brikho (Republican) 36.1%; ▌Greg Creswell (Libertarian) 2.1%; ▌John McDermott (Green) 1.4%
Michigan 10	R+6	Candice Miller	Republican	2002	Incumbent re-elected.	▌ ✓ Candice Miller (Republican) 68.7%; ▌Chuck Stadler (Democratic) 29.4%; ▌Harley Mikkelson (Green)2.0%
Michigan 11	R+4	Kerry Bentivolio	Republican	2012	Incumbent lost renomination. Republican hold.	▌ ✓ David Trott (Republican) 55.9%; ▌Robert L. McKenzie (Democratic) 40.5%; ▌John Tatar (Libertarian) 3.1%
Michigan 12	D+15	John D. Dingell Jr.	Democratic	1955 (special)	Incumbent retired. Democratic hold.	▌ ✓ Debbie Dingell (Democratic) 65.0%; ▌Terry Bowman (Republican) 31.3%; ▌Gary Walkowicz (Independent) 2.4%; ▌Bhagwan Dashairya (Libertarian) 1.2%
Michigan 13	D+34	John Conyers	Democratic	1964	Incumbent re-elected.	▌ ✓ John Conyers (Democratic) 79.5%; ▌Jeff Gorman (Republican) 16.3%; ▌Chris Sharer (Libertarian) 2.1%; ▌Sam Johnson (Independent) 2.1%
Michigan 14	D+29	Gary Peters	Democratic	2008	Incumbent retired to run for U.S. senator. Democratic hold.	▌ ✓ Brenda Lawrence (Democratic) 77.8%; ▌Christina Barr (Republican) 19.7%; ▌Leonard Schwartz (Libertarian) 1.6%; ▌Stephen Boyle (Green) 0.9%

== Minnesota ==
District		Incumbent			This race	
Location	PVI	Representative	Party	First elected	Status	Candidates
Minnesota 1	R+1	Tim Walz	DFL	2006	Incumbent re-elected.	▌ ✓ Tim Walz (DFL) 54.3%; ▌Jim Hagedorn (Republican) 45.7%
Minnesota 2	R+2	John Kline	Republican	2002	Incumbent re-elected.	▌ ✓ John Kline (Republican) 56.1%; ▌Mike Obermueller (DFL) 38.9%; ▌Paula Overby (Independence) 5.0%
Minnesota 3	R+2	Erik Paulsen	Republican	2008	Incumbent re-elected.	▌ ✓ Erik Paulsen (Republican) 62.2%; ▌Sharon Sund (DFL) 37.8%
Minnesota 4	D+11	Betty McCollum	DFL	2000	Incumbent re-elected.	▌ ✓ Betty McCollum (DFL) 61.2%; ▌Sharna Wahlgren (Republican) 32.9%; ▌Dave Thomas (Independence) 5.8%
Minnesota 5	D+22	Keith Ellison	DFL	2006	Incumbent re-elected.	▌ ✓ Keith Ellison (DFL) 70.9%; ▌Doug Daggett (Republican) 24.0%; ▌Lee Bauer (Independence) 5.1%
Minnesota 6	R+10	Michele Bachmann	Republican	2006	Incumbent retired. Republican hold.	▌ ✓ Tom Emmer (Republican) 56.3%; ▌Joe Perske (DFL) 38.4%; ▌John Denney (Independence) 5.3%
Minnesota 7	R+6	Collin Peterson	DFL	1990	Incumbent re-elected.	▌ ✓ Collin Peterson (DFL) 54.3%; ▌Torrey Westrom (Republican) 45.7%
Minnesota 8	D+1	Rick Nolan	DFL	1974; 1980 (retired); 2012	Incumbent re-elected.	▌ ✓ Rick Nolan (DFL) 48.5%; ▌Stewart Mills III (Republican) 47.1%; ▌Skip Sandman (Green) 4.3%

== Mississippi ==
District		Incumbent			This race	
Location	PVI	Representative	Party	First elected	Status	Candidates
Mississippi 1	R+16	Alan Nunnelee	Republican	2010	Incumbent re-elected.	▌ ✓ Alan Nunnelee (Republican) 67.9%; ▌Ron Dickey (Democratic) 28.9%; ▌Danny Bedwell (Libertarian) 2.5%; ▌Lajena Walley (Reform) 0.6%
Mississippi 2	D+13	Bennie Thompson	Democratic	1992	Incumbent re-elected.	▌ ✓ Bennie Thompson (Democratic) 67.7%; ▌Troy Ray (Independent) 24.5%; ▌Shelley Shoemake (Reform) 7.7%
Mississippi 3	R+14	Gregg Harper	Republican	2008	Incumbent re-elected.	▌ ✓ Gregg Harper (Republican) 68.9%; ▌Doug Magee (Democratic) 27.9%; ▌Roger Gerrard (Independent) 2.3%; ▌Barbara Dale Washer (Reform) 0.9%
Mississippi 4	R+21	Steven Palazzo	Republican	2010	Incumbent re-elected.	▌ ✓ Steven Palazzo (Republican) 69.9%; ▌Matt Moore (Democratic) 24.3%; ▌Cindy Burleson (Independent) 2.4%; ▌Joey Robinson (Libertarian) 2.2%; ▌Eli Jackson (Reform) 0.6%; ▌Ed Reich (Independent) 0.6%

== Missouri ==
District		Incumbent			This race	
Location	PVI	Representative	Party	First elected	Status	Candidates
Missouri 1	D+28	Lacy Clay	Democratic	2000	Incumbent re-elected.	▌ ✓ Lacy Clay (Democratic) 72.9%; ▌Daniel Elder (Republican) 21.6%; ▌Robb Cunningham (Libertarian) 5.5%
Missouri 2	R+8	Ann Wagner	Republican	2012	Incumbent re-elected.	▌ ✓ Ann Wagner (Republican) 64.1%; ▌Arthur Lieber (Democratic) 32.6%; ▌Bill Slantz (Libertarian) 3.3%
Missouri 3	R+13	Blaine Luetkemeyer	Republican	2008	Incumbent re-elected.	▌ ✓ Blaine Luetkemeyer (Republican) 68.3%; ▌Courtney Denton (Democratic) 27.2%; ▌Steven Hedrick (Libertarian) 4.5%
Missouri 4	R+13	Vicky Hartzler	Republican	2010	Incumbent re-elected.	▌ ✓ Vicky Hartzler (Republican) 68.1%; ▌Nate Irvin (Democratic) 26.4%; ▌Herschel Young (Libertarian) 5.6%
Missouri 5	D+9	Emanuel Cleaver	Democratic	2004	Incumbent re-elected.	▌ ✓ Emanuel Cleaver (Democratic) 51.6%; ▌Jacob Turk (Republican) 45.0%; ▌Roy Welborn (Libertarian) 3.5%
Missouri 6	R+12	Sam Graves	Republican	2000	Incumbent re-elected.	▌ ✓ Sam Graves (Republican) 66.6%; ▌Bill Hedge (Democratic) 29.5%; ▌Russ Monchil (Libertarian) 3.8%
Missouri 7	R+19	Billy Long	Republican	2010	Incumbent re-elected.	▌ ✓ Billy Long (Republican) 63.5%; ▌Jim Evans (Democratic) 28.8%; ▌Kevin Craig (Libertarian) 7.7%
Missouri 8	R+17	Jason T. Smith	Republican	2013 (special)	Incumbent re-elected.	▌ ✓ Jason T. Smith (Republican) 66.7%; ▌Barbara Stocker (Democratic) 24.3%; ▌Terry Hampton (Independent) 4.3%; ▌Doug Enyart (Constitution) 2.4%; ▌Rick Vandeven (Libertarian) 2.4%

== Montana ==
District		Incumbent			This race	
Location	PVI	Representative	Party	First elected	Status	Candidates
Montana at-large	R+7	Steve Daines	Republican	2012	Incumbent retired to run for U.S. senator. Republican hold.	▌ ✓ Ryan Zinke (Republican) 55.4%; ▌John Lewis (Democratic) 40.4%; ▌Mike Fellows (Libertarian) 4.2%

== Nebraska ==
District		Incumbent			This race	
Location	PVI	Representative	Party	First elected	Status	Candidates
Nebraska 1	R+10	Jeff Fortenberry	Republican	2004	Incumbent re-elected.	▌ ✓ Jeff Fortenberry (Republican) 68.8%; ▌Dennis Crawford (Democratic) 31.2%
Nebraska 2	R+4	Lee Terry	Republican	1998	Incumbent lost re-election. Democratic gain.	▌ ✓ Brad Ashford (Democratic) 49.0%; ▌Lee Terry (Republican) 45.7%; ▌Steven Laird (Libertarian) 5.3%
Nebraska 3	R+23	Adrian M. Smith	Republican	2006	Incumbent re-elected.	▌ ✓ Adrian M. Smith (Republican) 75.4%; ▌Mark Sullivan (Democratic) 24.6%

== Nevada ==
District		Incumbent			This race	
Location	PVI	Representative	Party	First elected	Status	Candidates
Nevada 1	D+14	Dina Titus	Democratic	2008; 2010 (defeated); 2012	Incumbent re-elected.	▌ ✓ Dina Titus (Democratic) 56.8%; ▌Annette Teijeiro (Republican) 37.9%; ▌Richard Charles (Libertarian) 3.3%; ▌Kamau Bakari (Independent American) 2.0%
Nevada 2	R+5	Mark Amodei	Republican	2011 (special)	Incumbent re-elected.	▌ ✓ Mark Amodei (Republican) 65.8%; ▌Kristen Spees (Democratic) 27.9%; ▌Janine Hansen (Independent American) 6.3%
Nevada 3	EVEN	Joe Heck	Republican	2010	Incumbent re-elected.	▌ ✓ Joe Heck (Republican) 60.8%; ▌Erin Bilbray (Democratic) 36.1%; ▌David Goossen (Independent) 1.1%; ▌Randy Kimmick (Libertarian) 1.1%; ▌Steven St. John (Independent) 0.9%
Nevada 4	D+4	Steven Horsford	Democratic	2012	Incumbent lost re-election. Republican gain.	▌ ✓ Cresent Hardy (Republican) 48.5%; ▌Steven Horsford (Democratic) 45.8%; ▌Steve Brown (Libertarian) 3.2%; ▌Russell Best (Independent American) 2.6%

== New Hampshire ==
District		Incumbent			This race	
Location	PVI	Representative	Party	First elected	Status	Candidates
New Hampshire 1	R+1	Carol Shea-Porter	Democratic	2006; 2010 (defeated); 2012	Incumbent lost re-election. Republican gain.	▌ ✓ Frank Guinta (Republican) 51.8%; ▌Carol Shea-Porter (Democratic) 48.2%
New Hampshire 2	D+3	Ann McLane Kuster	Democratic	2012	Incumbent re-elected.	▌ ✓ Ann McLane Kuster (Democratic) 55%; ▌Marilinda Garcia (Republican) 45%

== New Jersey ==
District		Incumbent			This race	
Location	PVI	Representative	Party	First elected	Status	Candidates
New Jersey 1	D+13	Vacant			Rep. Rob Andrews (D) resigned February 18, 2014. Democratic hold. Winner also elected to fill unexpired term, see above.	▌ ✓ Donald Norcross (Democratic) 57.4%; ▌Garry Cobb (Republican) 39.4%; ▌Scot Tomaszewski (Independent) 1.1%; ▌Margaret Chapman (Independent) 0.7%; ▌Robert Shapiro (Independent) 0.7%; ▌Mike Berman (Independent) 0.4%; ▌Don Letton (D-R) 0.3%
New Jersey 2	D+1	Frank LoBiondo	Republican	1994	Incumbent re-elected.	▌ ✓ Frank LoBiondo (Republican) 61.4%; ▌Bill Hughes Jr. (Democratic) 37.3%; ▌Alexander Spano (D-R) 0.4%; ▌Constantino Rozzo (American Labor) 0.3%; ▌Bayo Olabisi (Independent) 0.3%; ▌Gary Stein (Independent) 0.3%
New Jersey 3	R+1	Jon Runyan	Republican	2010	Incumbent retired. Republican hold.	▌ ✓ Tom MacArthur (Republican) 54.0%; ▌Aimee Belgard (Democratic) 44.3%; ▌Frederick John LaVergne (D-R) 1.7%
New Jersey 4	R+7	Chris Smith	Republican	1980	Incumbent re-elected.	▌ ✓ Chris Smith (Republican) 68.0%; ▌Ruben Scolavino (Democratic) 31.1%; ▌Scott Neuman (Independent) 0.9%
New Jersey 5	R+4	Scott Garrett	Republican	2002	Incumbent re-elected.	▌ ✓ Scott Garrett (Republican) 55.4%; ▌Roy Cho (Democratic) 43.3%; ▌Mark Quick (Independent) 1.3%
New Jersey 6	D+8	Frank Pallone	Democratic	1988	Incumbent re-elected.	▌ ✓ Frank Pallone (Democratic) 59.9%; ▌Anthony Wilkinson (Republican) 38.9%; ▌Dorit Goikhman (Libertarian) 1.2%
New Jersey 7	R+6	Leonard Lance	Republican	2008	Incumbent re-elected.	▌ ✓ Leonard Lance (Republican) 59.2%; ▌Janice Kovach (Democratic) 38.8%; ▌Jim Gawron (Libertarian) 2.0%
New Jersey 8	D+24	Albio Sires	Democratic	2006	Incumbent re-elected.	▌ ✓ Albio Sires (Democratic) 77.4%; ▌Jude-Anthony Tiscornia (Republican) 19.0%; ▌Herbert Shaw (Independent) 1.5%; ▌Pablo Olivera (Independent) 1.3%; ▌Robert Thorne (Independent) 0.8%
New Jersey 9	D+14	Bill Pascrell	Democratic	1996	Incumbent re-elected.	▌ ✓ Bill Pascrell (Democratic) 68.5%; ▌Dierdre Paul (Republican) 30.1%; ▌Nestor Montilla (Independent) 1.4%
New Jersey 10	D+34	Donald Payne Jr.	Democratic	2012	Incumbent re-elected.	▌ ✓ Donald Payne Jr. (Democratic) 85.4%; ▌Yolanda Dentley (Republican) 12.6%; ▌Gwendolyn Franklin (Independent) 1.1%; ▌Dark Angel (Independent) 0.9%
New Jersey 11	R+6	Rodney Frelinghuysen	Republican	1994	Incumbent re-elected.	▌ ✓ Rodney Frelinghuysen (Republican) 62.6%; ▌Mark Dunec (Democratic) 37.4%
New Jersey 12	D+14	Rush Holt Jr.	Democratic	1998	Incumbent retired. Democratic hold.	▌ ✓ Bonnie Watson Coleman (Democratic) 61.0%; ▌Alieta Eck (Republican) 36.5%; ▌Don DeZarn (Independent) 0.9%; ▌Steven Welzer (Green) 0.6%; ▌Ken Cody (Independent) 0.4%; ▌Jack Freudenheim (Independent) 0.4%; ▌Allen Cannon (D-R) 0.3%

== New Mexico ==
District		Incumbent			This race	
Location	PVI	Representative	Party	First elected	Status	Candidates
New Mexico 1	D+7	Michelle Luján Grisham	Democratic	2012	Incumbent re-elected.	▌ ✓ Michelle Luján Grisham (Democratic) 58.6%; ▌Mike Frese (Republican) 41.4%
New Mexico 2	R+5	Steve Pearce	Republican	2002; 2008 (retired); 2010	Incumbent re-elected.	▌ ✓ Steve Pearce (Republican) 64.5%; ▌Rocky Lara (Democratic) 35.5%
New Mexico 3	D+8	Ben Ray Luján	Democratic	2008	Incumbent re-elected.	▌ ✓ Ben Ray Luján (Democratic) 61.5%; ▌Jeff Byrd (Republican) 38.5%

== New York ==
District		Incumbent			This race	
Location	PVI	Representative	Party	First elected	Status	Candidates
New York 1	R+2	Timothy H. Bishop	Democratic	2002	Incumbent lost re-election. Republican gain.	▌ ✓ Lee Zeldin (Republican) 54.4%; ▌Tim Bishop (Democratic) 45.5%
New York 2	R+1	Peter T. King	Republican	1992	Incumbent re-elected.	▌ ✓ Peter T. King (Republican) 68.3%; ▌Pat Maher (Democratic) 30.0%; ▌Will Stevenson (Green) 1.6%
New York 3	EVEN	Steve Israel	Democratic	2000	Incumbent re-elected.	▌ ✓ Steve Israel (Democratic) 54.8%; ▌Grant Lally (Republican) 45.2%
New York 4	D+3	Carolyn McCarthy	Democratic	1996	Incumbent retired. Democratic hold.	▌ ✓ Kathleen Rice (Democratic) 52.8%; ▌Bruce Blakeman (Republican) 47.1%
New York 5	D+35	Gregory W. Meeks	Democratic	1998	Incumbent re-elected.	▌ ✓ Gregory W. Meeks (Democratic) 94.9%; ▌Allen Steinhardt (Independent) 4.9%
New York 6	D+13	Grace Meng	Democratic	2012	Incumbent re-elected.	▌ ✓ Grace Meng (Democratic) 98.8%
New York 7	D+34	Nydia Velázquez	Democratic	1992	Incumbent re-elected.	▌ ✓ Nydia Velázquez (Democratic) 88.7%; ▌Jose Luis Fernandez (Republican) 9.0%; ▌Allan Romaguera (Conservative) 2.2%
New York 8	D+35	Hakeem Jeffries	Democratic	2012	Incumbent re-elected.	▌ ✓ Hakeem Jeffries (Democratic) 92.0%; ▌Alan Bellone (Conservative) 7.9%
New York 9	D+32	Yvette Clarke	Democratic	2006	Incumbent re-elected.	▌ ✓ Yvette Clarke (Democratic) 89.3%; ▌Daniel Cavanagh (Conservative) 10.5%
New York 10	D+23	Jerrold Nadler	Democratic	1992	Incumbent re-elected.	▌ ✓ Jerrold Nadler (Democratic) 87.4%; ▌Ross Brady (Conservative) 11.8%; ▌Michael Dilger (America First) 0.5%
New York 11	R+2	Michael Grimm	Republican	2012	Incumbent re-elected.	▌ ✓ Michael Grimm (Republican) 54.9%; ▌Domenic Recchia (Democratic) 42.1%; ▌Henry Bardel (Green) 2.5%
New York 12	D+27	Carolyn Maloney	Democratic	1992	Incumbent re-elected.	▌ ✓ Carolyn Maloney (Democratic) 79.9%; ▌Nick Di Iorio (Republican) 20.0%
New York 13	D+42	Charles Rangel	Democratic	1970	Incumbent re-elected.	▌ ✓ Charles Rangel (Democratic) 87.3%; ▌Daniel Vila (Green) 12.5%
New York 14	D+26	Joe Crowley	Democratic	1998	Incumbent re-elected.	▌ ✓ Joe Crowley (Democratic) 88.0%; ▌Elizabeth Perri (Conservative) 11.8%
New York 15	D+42	José E. Serrano	Democratic	1990	Incumbent re-elected.	▌ ✓ José E. Serrano (Democratic) 97.1%; ▌Eduardo Ramirez (Conservative) 1.9%; ▌Bill Edstrom (Green) 1.0%
New York 16	D+21	Eliot Engel	Democratic	1988	Incumbent re-elected.	▌ ✓ Eliot Engel (Democratic) 99.3%
New York 17	D+5	Nita Lowey	Democratic	1988	Incumbent re-elected.	▌ ✓ Nita Lowey (Democratic) 56.4%; ▌Chris Day (Republican) 43.5%
New York 18	EVEN	Sean Patrick Maloney	Democratic	2012	Incumbent re-elected.	▌ ✓ Sean Patrick Maloney (Democratic) 49.7%; ▌Nan Hayworth (Republican) 47.8%; ▌Scott Smith (Independent) 2.4%
New York 19	D+1	Chris Gibson	Republican	2010	Incumbent re-elected.	▌ ✓ Chris Gibson (Republican) 64.5%; ▌Sean Eldridge (Democratic) 35.5%
New York 20	D+7	Paul Tonko	Democratic	2008	Incumbent re-elected.	▌ ✓ Paul Tonko (Democratic) 61.2%; ▌Jim Fischer (Republican) 38.7%
New York 21	EVEN	Bill Owens	Democratic	2009 (special)	Incumbent retired. Republican gain.	▌ ✓ Elise Stefanik (Republican) 55.1%; ▌Aaron Woolf (Democratic) 33.8%; ▌Matt Funiciello (Green) 11.0%
New York 22	R+3	Richard L. Hanna	Republican	2010	Incumbent re-elected.	▌ ✓ Richard L. Hanna (Republican) 98.4%
New York 23	R+3	Tom Reed	Republican	2010 (special)	Incumbent re-elected.	▌ ✓ Tom Reed (Republican) 61.7%; ▌Martha Robertson (Democratic) 38.3%
New York 24	D+5	Dan Maffei	Democratic	2008; 2010 (defeated); 2012	Incumbent lost re-election. Republican gain.	▌ ✓ John Katko (Republican) 59.5%; ▌Dan Maffei (Democratic) 40.3%
New York 25	D+7	Louise Slaughter	Democratic	1986	Incumbent re-elected.	▌ ✓ Louise Slaughter (Democratic) 50.2%; ▌Mark Assini (Republican) 49.7%
New York 26	D+7	Brian Higgins	Democratic	2004	Incumbent re-elected.	▌ ✓ Brian Higgins (Democratic) 68.15%; ▌Kathy Weppner (Republican) 31.85%
New York 27	R+8	Chris Collins	Republican	2012	Incumbent re-elected.	▌ ✓ Chris Collins (Republican) 71.0%; ▌James O'Donnell (Democratic) 28.9%

== North Carolina ==
District		Incumbent			This race	
Location	PVI	Representative	Party	First elected	Status	Candidates
North Carolina 1	D+19	G. K. Butterfield	Democratic	2004 (special)	Incumbent re-elected.	▌ ✓ G. K. Butterfield (Democratic) 73.38%; ▌Arthur Rich (Republican) 26.62%
North Carolina 2	R+10	Renee Ellmers	Republican	2010	Incumbent re-elected.	▌ ✓ Renee Ellmers (Republican) 58.83%; ▌Clay Aiken (Democratic) 41.17%
North Carolina 3	R+11	Walter B. Jones Jr.	Republican	1994	Incumbent re-elected.	▌ ✓ Walter B. Jones Jr. (Republican) 67.81%; ▌Marshall Adame (Democratic) 32.19%
North Carolina 4	D+20	David E. Price	Democratic	1986; 1994 (defeated); 1996	Incumbent re-elected.	▌ ✓ David E. Price (Democratic) 74.75%; ▌Paul M. Wright (Republican) 25.25%
North Carolina 5	R+11	Virginia Foxx	Republican	2004	Incumbent re-elected.	▌ ✓ Virginia Foxx (Republican) 61.02%; ▌Josh Brannon (Democratic) 38.98%
North Carolina 6	R+10	Howard Coble	Republican	1984	Incumbent retired. Republican hold.	▌ ✓ Mark Walker (Republican) 58.67%; ▌Laura Fjeld (Democratic) 41.33%
North Carolina 7	R+12	Mike McIntyre	Democratic	1996	Incumbent retired. Republican gain.	▌ ✓ David Rouzer (Republican) 59.35%; ▌Jonathan Barfield (Democratic) 37.11%; ▌J. Wesley Casteen (Libertarian) 3.47%
North Carolina 8	R+11	Richard Hudson	Republican	2012	Incumbent re-elected.	▌ ✓ Richard Hudson (Republican) 64.86%; ▌Antonio Blue (Democratic) 35.14%
North Carolina 9	R+8	Robert Pittenger	Republican	2012	Incumbent re-elected.	▌ ✓ Robert Pittenger (Republican) 93.90%
North Carolina 10	R+11	Patrick McHenry	Republican	2004	Incumbent re-elected.	▌ ✓ Patrick McHenry (Republican) 61.02%; ▌Tate MacQueen (Democratic) 38.98%
North Carolina 11	R+13	Mark Meadows	Republican	2012	Incumbent re-elected.	▌ ✓ Mark Meadows (Republican) 62.9%; ▌Thomas Waddell Hill (Democratic) 37.1%
North Carolina 12	D+26	Vacant			Mel Watt (D) resigned January 6, 2014, to become director of the FHFA. Democratic hold. Winner also elected to fill unexpired term, see above.	▌ ✓ Alma Adams (Democratic) 75.35%; ▌Vince Coakley (Republican) 24.65%
North Carolina 13	R+8	George Holding	Republican	2012	Incumbent re-elected.	▌ ✓ George Holding (Republican) 57.31%; ▌Brenda Cleary (Democratic) 42.69%

== North Dakota ==
District		Incumbent			This race	
Location	PVI	Representative	Party	First elected	Status	Candidates
North Dakota at-large	R+10	Kevin Cramer	Republican	2012	Incumbent re-elected.	▌ ✓ Kevin Cramer (Republican) 55.5%; ▌George B. Sinner (Democratic-NPL) 38.5%; ▌Jack Seaman (Libertarian) 5.8%

== Ohio ==
District		Incumbent			This race	
Location	PVI	Representative	Party	First elected	Status	Candidates
Ohio 1	R+6	Steve Chabot	Republican	1994; 2008 (defeated); 2010	Incumbent re-elected.	▌ ✓ Steve Chabot (Republican) 63.2%; ▌Fred Kundrata (Democratic) 36.8%
Ohio 2	R+8	Brad Wenstrup	Republican	2012	Incumbent re-elected.	▌ ✓ Brad Wenstrup (Republican) 66.0%; ▌Marek Tyszkiewicz (Democratic) 34.0%
Ohio 3	D+17	Joyce Beatty	Democratic	2012	Incumbent re-elected.	▌ ✓ Joyce Beatty (Democratic) 64.1%; ▌Jim Burgess (Republican) 35.9%
Ohio 4	R+9	Jim Jordan	Republican	2006	Incumbent re-elected.	▌ ✓ Jim Jordan (Republican) 67.7%; ▌Janet Garrett (Democratic) 32.3%
Ohio 5	R+7	Bob Latta	Republican	2006	Incumbent re-elected.	▌ ✓ Bob Latta (Republican) 66.5%; ▌Robert Fry (Democratic) 28.9%; ▌Eric Eberly (Libertarian) 4.6%
Ohio 6	R+8	Bill Johnson	Republican	2010	Incumbent re-elected.	▌ ✓ Bill Johnson (Republican) 58.2%; ▌Jennifer Garrison (Democratic) 38.6%; ▌Dennis Lambert (Green) 3.2%
Ohio 7	R+6	Bob Gibbs	Republican	2010	Incumbent re-elected.	▌ ✓ Bob Gibbs (Republican) 100%
Ohio 8	R+15	John Boehner	Republican	1990	Incumbent re-elected.	▌ ✓ John Boehner (Republican) 67.2%; ▌Tom Poetter (Democratic) 27.4%; ▌Jim Condit Jr. (Constitution) 5.4%
Ohio 9	D+15	Marcy Kaptur	Democratic	1982	Incumbent re-elected.	▌ ✓ Marcy Kaptur (Democratic) 67.7%; ▌Richard May (Republican) 32.3%
Ohio 10	R+3	Mike Turner	Republican	2002	Incumbent re-elected.	▌ ✓ Mike Turner (Republican) 65.2%; ▌Robert Klepinger (Democratic) 31.5%; ▌David Harlow (Libertarian) 3.3%
Ohio 11	D+30	Marcia Fudge	Democratic	2006	Incumbent re-elected.	▌ ✓ Marcia Fudge (Democratic) 79.4%; ▌Mark Zetzer (Republican) 20.6%
Ohio 12	R+8	Pat Tiberi	Republican	2000	Incumbent re-elected.	▌ ✓ Pat Tiberi (Republican) 68.1%; ▌David Tibbs (Democratic) 27.8%; ▌Bob Hart (Green) 4.1%
Ohio 13	D+11	Tim Ryan	Democratic	2002	Incumbent re-elected.	▌ ✓ Tim Ryan (Democratic) 68.5%; ▌Thomas Pekarek (Republican) 31.5%
Ohio 14	R+4	David Joyce	Republican	2012	Incumbent re-elected.	▌ ✓ David Joyce (Republican) 63.3%; ▌Michael Wager (Democratic) 33.0%; ▌David Macko (Libertarian) 3.7%
Ohio 15	R+6	Steve Stivers	Republican	2010	Incumbent re-elected.	▌ ✓ Steve Stivers (Republican) 66.0%; ▌Scott Wharton (Democratic) 34.0%
Ohio 16	R+6	Jim Renacci	Republican	2010	Incumbent re-elected.	▌ ✓ Jim Renacci (Republican) 63.7%; ▌Pete Crossland (Democratic) 36.3%

== Oklahoma ==
District		Incumbent			This race	
Location	PVI	Representative	Party	First elected	Status	Candidates
Oklahoma 1	R+18	Jim Bridenstine	Republican	2012	Incumbent re-elected.	▌ ✓ Jim Bridenstine (Republican); Uncontested
Oklahoma 2	R+20	Markwayne Mullin	Republican	2012	Incumbent re-elected.	▌ ✓ Markwayne Mullin (Republican) 70.0%; ▌Earl Everett (Democratic) 24.6%; ▌Jon Douthitt (Independent) 5.4%
Oklahoma 3	R+26	Frank Lucas	Republican	1994	Incumbent re-elected.	▌ ✓ Frank Lucas (Republican) 78.6%; ▌Frankie Robbins (Democratic) 21.4%
Oklahoma 4	R+19	Tom Cole	Republican	2002	Incumbent re-elected.	▌ ✓ Tom Cole (Republican) 70.8%; ▌Bert Smith (Democratic) 24.7%; ▌Dennis Johnson (Independent) 4.5%
Oklahoma 5	R+12	James Lankford	Republican	2010	Incumbent retired to run for U.S. senator. Republican hold.	▌ ✓ Steve Russell (Republican) 60.1%; ▌Al McAffrey (Democratic) 36.3%; ▌Robert Murphy (Independent) 1.4%; ▌Tom Boggs (Independent) 1.3%; ▌Buddy Ray (Independent) 0.9%

== Oregon ==
District		Incumbent			This race	
Location	PVI	Representative	Party	First elected	Status	Candidates
Oregon 1	D+7	Suzanne Bonamici	Democratic	2012 (special)	Incumbent re-elected.	▌ ✓ Suzanne Bonamici (Democratic) 57.6%; ▌Jason Yates (Republican) 34.6%; ▌James Foster (Libertarian) 3.9%; ▌Steven Reynolds (Pacific Green) 3.8%
Oregon 2	R+10	Greg Walden	Republican	1998	Incumbent re-elected.	▌ ✓ Greg Walden (Republican) 70.4%; ▌Aelea Cristofferson (Democratic) 25.7%; ▌Sharon Durbin (Libertarian) 3.9%
Oregon 3	D+22	Earl Blumenauer	Democratic	1996	Incumbent re-elected.	▌ ✓ Earl Blumenauer (Democratic) 73.0%; ▌James Buchal (Republican) 19.5%; ▌Michael Meo (Pacific Green) 4.0%; ▌Jeffrey Langan (Libertarian) 2.1%
Oregon 4	D+2	Peter DeFazio	Democratic	1986	Incumbent re-elected.	▌ ✓ Peter DeFazio (Democratic) 58.6%; ▌Art Robinson (Republican) 37.7%; ▌Mike Beilstein (Pacific Green) 2.2%; ▌David Chester (Libertarian) 1.5%
Oregon 5	EVEN	Kurt Schrader	Democratic	2008	Incumbent re-elected.	▌ ✓ Kurt Schrader (Democratic) 53.9%; ▌Tootie Smith (Republican) 39.4%; ▌Marvin Sannes (Independent) 2.7%; ▌Raymond Baldwin (Constitution) 2.2%; ▌Daniel Souza (Libertarian) 1.8%

== Pennsylvania ==
District		Incumbent			This race	
Location	PVI	Representative	Party	First elected	Status	Candidates
Pennsylvania 1	D+28	Bob Brady	Democratic	1996	Incumbent re-elected.	▌ ✓ Bob Brady (Democratic) 82.8%; ▌Megan Rath (Republican) 17.2%
Pennsylvania 2	D+38	Chaka Fattah	Democratic	1994	Incumbent re-elected.	▌ ✓ Chaka Fattah (Democratic) 87.7%; ▌Armond James (Republican) 12.3%
Pennsylvania 3	R+8	Mike Kelly	Republican	2010	Incumbent re-elected.	▌ ✓ Mike Kelly (Republican) 60.6%; ▌Dan LaVallee (Democratic) 39.4%
Pennsylvania 4	R+9	Scott Perry	Republican	2012	Incumbent re-elected.	▌ ✓ Scott Perry (Republican) 74.5%; ▌Linda D. Thompson (Democratic) 25.5%
Pennsylvania 5	R+8	Glenn Thompson	Republican	2008	Incumbent re-elected.	▌ ✓ Glenn Thompson (Republican) 63.6%; ▌Kerith Strano Taylor (Democratic) 36.4%
Pennsylvania 6	R+2	Jim Gerlach	Republican	2002	Incumbent retired. Republican hold.	▌ ✓ Ryan Costello (Republican) 56.3%; ▌Manan Trivedi (Democratic) 43.7%
Pennsylvania 7	R+2	Pat Meehan	Republican	2010	Incumbent re-elected.	▌ ✓ Pat Meehan (Republican) 62.0%; ▌Mary Ellen Balchunis (Democratic) 38.0%
Pennsylvania 8	R+1	Mike Fitzpatrick	Republican	2004; 2006 (defeated); 2010	Incumbent re-elected.	▌ ✓ Mike Fitzpatrick (Republican) 61.9%; ▌Kevin Strouse (Democratic) 38.1%
Pennsylvania 9	R+14	Bill Shuster	Republican	2001 (special)	Incumbent re-elected.	▌ ✓ Bill Shuster (Republican) 63.5%; ▌Alanna Hartzok (Democratic) 36.5%
Pennsylvania 10	R+12	Tom Marino	Republican	2010	Incumbent re-elected.	▌ ✓ Tom Marino (Republican) 62.6%; ▌Scott Brion (Democratic) 24.8%; ▌Nick Troiano (Independent) 12.6%
Pennsylvania 11	R+6	Lou Barletta	Republican	2010	Incumbent re-elected.	▌ ✓ Lou Barletta (Republican) 66.3%; ▌Andy Ostrowski (Democratic) 33.7%
Pennsylvania 12	R+9	Keith Rothfus	Republican	2012	Incumbent re-elected.	▌ ✓ Keith Rothfus (Republican) 59.3%; ▌Erin McClelland (Democratic) 40.7%
Pennsylvania 13	D+13	Allyson Schwartz	Democratic	2004	Incumbent retired to run for Governor of Pennsylvania. Democratic hold.	▌ ✓ Brendan Boyle (Democratic) 67.1%; ▌Dee Adcock (Republican) 32.9%
Pennsylvania 14	D+15	Michael F. Doyle	Democratic	1994	Incumbent re-elected.	▌ ✓ Michael F. Doyle (Democratic) 100%
Pennsylvania 15	R+2	Charlie Dent	Republican	2004	Incumbent re-elected.	▌ ✓ Charlie Dent (Republican) 100%
Pennsylvania 16	R+4	Joseph R. Pitts	Republican	1996	Incumbent re-elected.	▌ ✓ Joseph R. Pitts (Republican) 57.7%; ▌Tom Houghton (Democratic) 42.3%
Pennsylvania 17	D+4	Matt Cartwright	Democratic	2012	Incumbent re-elected.	▌ ✓ Matt Cartwright (Democratic) 56.8%; ▌David Moylan (Republican) 43.2%
Pennsylvania 18	R+10	Tim Murphy	Republican	2002	Incumbent re-elected.	▌ ✓ Tim Murphy (Republican) 100%

== Rhode Island ==
District		Incumbent			This race	
Location	PVI	Representative	Party	First elected	Status	Candidates
Rhode Island 1	D+15	David Cicilline	Democratic	2010	Incumbent re-elected.	▌ ✓ David Cicilline (Democratic) 59.6%; ▌Cormick Lynch (Republican) 40.4%
Rhode Island 2	D+8	James Langevin	Democratic	2000	Incumbent re-elected.	▌ ✓ James Langevin (Democratic) 62.3%; ▌Rhue Reis (Republican) 37.7%

== South Carolina ==
District		Incumbent			This race	
Location	PVI	Representative	Party	First elected	Status	Candidates
South Carolina 1	R+11	Mark Sanford	Republican	1994; 2000 (retired); 2013 (special)	Incumbent re-elected.	▌ ✓ Mark Sanford (Republican); Unopposed
South Carolina 2	R+16	Joe Wilson	Republican	2001 (special)	Incumbent re-elected.	▌ ✓ Joe Wilson (Republican) 62.4%; ▌Phil Black (Democratic) 35.3%; ▌Harold Geddings III (Labor) 2.3%
South Carolina 3	R+18	Jeff Duncan	Republican	2010	Incumbent re-elected.	▌ ✓ Jeff Duncan (Republican) 71.2%; ▌Barbara Jo Mullis (Democratic) 28.8%
South Carolina 4	R+15	Trey Gowdy	Republican	2010	Incumbent re-elected.	▌ ✓ Trey Gowdy (Republican) 84.8%; ▌Curtis McLaughlin (Libertarian) 15.2%
South Carolina 5	R+9	Mick Mulvaney	Republican	2010	Incumbent re-elected.	▌ ✓ Mick Mulvaney (Republican) 58.9%; ▌Tom Adams (Democratic) 41.1%
South Carolina 6	D+21	Jim Clyburn	Democratic	1992	Incumbent re-elected.	▌ ✓ Jim Clyburn (Democratic) 72.5%; ▌Anthony Culler (Republican) 25.6%; ▌Kevin Umbaugh (Libertarian) 1.9%
South Carolina 7	R+7	Tom Rice	Republican	2012	Incumbent re-elected.	▌ ✓ Tom Rice (Republican) 60.0%; ▌Gloria Tinubu (Democratic) 40.0%

== South Dakota ==
District		Incumbent			This race	
Location	PVI	Representative	Party	First elected	Status	Candidates
South Dakota at-large	R+10	Kristi Noem	Republican	2010	Incumbent re-elected.	▌ ✓ Kristi Noem (Republican) 66.5%; ▌Corinna Robinson (Democratic) 33.5%

== Tennessee ==
District		Incumbent			This race	
Location	PVI	Representative	Party	First elected	Status	Candidates
Tennessee 1	R+25	Phil Roe	Republican	2008	Incumbent re-elected.	▌ ✓ Phil Roe (Republican) 82.8%; ▌Bob Smith (Green) 7.1%; ▌Robert Franklin (Independent) 7.1%; ▌Michael Salyer (Libertarian) 3.0%
Tennessee 2	R+20	Jimmy Duncan	Republican	1988 (special)	Incumbent re-elected.	▌ ✓ Jimmy Duncan (Republican) 72.5%; ▌Bob Scott (Democratic) 22.6%; ▌Casey Gouge (Independent) 2.5%; ▌Norris Dryer (Green) 2.4%
Tennessee 3	R+16	Chuck Fleischmann	Republican	2010	Incumbent re-elected.	▌ ✓ Chuck Fleischmann (Republican) 62.4%; ▌Mary Headrick (Democratic) 34.6%; ▌Cassandra Mitchell (Independent) 3.1%
Tennessee 4	R+18	Scott DesJarlais	Republican	2010	Incumbent re-elected.	▌ ✓ Scott DesJarlais (Republican) 58.3%; ▌Lenda Sherrell (Democratic) 35.3%; ▌Robert Doggart (Independent) 6.4%
Tennessee 5	D+5	Jim Cooper	Democratic	1982; 1994 (retired); 2002	Incumbent re-elected.	▌ ✓ Jim Cooper (Democratic) 62.3%; ▌Bob Ries (Republican) 35.7%; ▌Paul Deakin (Independent) 2.0%
Tennessee 6	R+21	Diane Black	Republican	2010	Incumbent re-elected.	▌ ✓ Diane Black (Republican) 71.1%; ▌Amos Powers (Democratic) 23.0%; ▌Mike Winton (Independent) 5.9%
Tennessee 7	R+18	Marsha Blackburn	Republican	2002	Incumbent re-elected.	▌ ✓ Marsha Blackburn (Republican) 70.0%; ▌Dan Cramer (Democratic) 26.8%; ▌Lenny Ladner (Libertarian) 3.2%
Tennessee 8	R+19	Stephen Fincher	Republican	2010	Incumbent re-elected.	▌ ✓ Stephen Fincher (Republican) 70.8%; ▌Wes Bradley (Democratic) 24.6%; ▌Mark Rawles (Constitution) 2.6%; ▌James Hart (Independent) 2.0%
Tennessee 9	D+25	Steve Cohen	Democratic	2006	Incumbent re-elected.	▌ ✓ Steve Cohen (Democratic) 75.0%; ▌Charlotte Bergmann (Republican) 23.3%; ▌Floyd Alberson (Independent) 0.7%; ▌Paul Cook (Independent) 0.6%; ▌Herbert Bass (Independent) 0.4%

== Texas ==
District		Incumbent			This race	
Location	PVI	Representative	Party	First elected	Status	Candidates
Texas 1	R+24	Louie Gohmert	Republican	2004	Incumbent re-elected.	▌ ✓ Louie Gohmert (Republican) 77.5%; ▌Shirley McKellar (Democratic) 22.5%
Texas 2	R+16	Ted Poe	Republican	2004	Incumbent re-elected.	▌ ✓ Ted Poe (Republican) 68.0%; ▌Niko Letsos (Democratic) 29.6%; ▌James B. Veasaw (Libertarian) 1.5%; ▌Mark A. Roberts (Green) 0.9%
Texas 3	R+17	Sam Johnson	Republican	1991 (special)	Incumbent re-elected.	▌ ✓ Sam Johnson (Republican) 82.0%; ▌Paul Blair (Green) 18.0%
Texas 4	R+25	Ralph Hall	Republican	1980 (Note: Hall was first elected as a Democrat. He became a Republican in January 2004.)	Incumbent lost renomination. Republican hold.	▌ ✓ John Ratcliffe (Republican); Unopposed
Texas 5	R+17	Jeb Hensarling	Republican	2002	Incumbent re-elected.	▌ ✓ Jeb Hensarling (Republican) 85.5%; ▌Ken Ashby (Libertarian) 14.5%
Texas 6	R+11	Joe Barton	Republican	1984	Incumbent re-elected.	▌ ✓ Joe Barton (Republican) 61.2%; ▌David Cozad (Democratic) 36.4%; ▌Hugh Chauvin (Libertarian) 2.4%
Texas 7	R+13	John Culberson	Republican	2000	Incumbent re-elected.	▌ ✓ John Culberson (Republican) 63.3%; ▌James Cargas (Democratic) 34.5%; ▌Gerald Fowler (Libertarian) 2.2%
Texas 8	R+29	Kevin Brady	Republican	1996	Incumbent re-elected.	▌ ✓ Kevin Brady (Republican) 89.3%; ▌Ken Petty (Libertarian) 10.7%
Texas 9	D+25	Al Green	Democratic	2004	Incumbent re-elected.	▌ ✓ Al Green (Democratic) 90.8%; ▌Johnny Johnson (Libertarian) 9.2%
Texas 10	R+11	Michael McCaul	Republican	2004	Incumbent re-elected.	▌ ✓ Michael McCaul (Republican) 62.2%; ▌Tawana Walter-Cadien (Democratic) 34.1%; ▌Bill Kelsey (Libertarian) 3.7%
Texas 11	R+31	Mike Conaway	Republican	2004	Incumbent re-elected.	▌ ✓ Mike Conaway (Republican) 90.3%; ▌Ryan Lange (Libertarian) 9.7%
Texas 12	R+19	Kay Granger	Republican	1996	Incumbent re-elected.	▌ ✓ Kay Granger (Republican) 71.3%; ▌Mark Greene (Democratic) 26.3%; ▌Ed Colliver (Libertarian) 2.4%
Texas 13	R+32	Mac Thornberry	Republican	1994	Incumbent re-elected.	▌ ✓ Mac Thornberry (Republican) 84.3%; ▌Mike Minter (Democratic) 12.8%; ▌Emily Pivoda (Libertarian) 2.2%; ▌Don Cook (Green) 0.7%
Texas 14	R+12	Randy Weber	Republican	2012	Incumbent re-elected.	▌ ✓ Randy Weber (Republican) 61.8%; ▌Donald Brown (Democratic) 36.1%; ▌John Wieder (Libertarian) 2.1%
Texas 15	D+5	Rubén Hinojosa	Democratic	1996	Incumbent re-elected.	▌ ✓ Rubén Hinojosa (Democratic) 54.0%; ▌Eddie Zamora (Republican) 43.3%; ▌Johnny Partain (Libertarian) 2.7%
Texas 16	D+12	Beto O'Rourke	Democratic	2012	Incumbent re-elected.	▌ ✓ Beto O'Rourke (Democratic) 67.5%; ▌Corey Roen (Republican) 29.2%; ▌Jaime O. Perez (Libertarian) 3.3%
Texas 17	R+13	Bill Flores	Republican	2010	Incumbent re-elected.	▌ ✓ Bill Flores (Republican) 64.6%; ▌Nick Haynes (Democratic) 32.4%; ▌Shawn Hamilton (Libertarian) 3.0%
Texas 18	D+24	Sheila Jackson Lee	Democratic	1994	Incumbent re-elected.	▌ ✓ Sheila Jackson Lee (Democratic) 71.8%; ▌Sean Seibert (Republican) 24.8%; ▌Vince Duncan (Independent) 2.2%; ▌Remington Alessi (Green) 1.2%
Texas 19	R+26	Randy Neugebauer	Republican	2003 (special)	Incumbent re-elected.	▌ ✓ Randy Neugebauer (Republican) 77.2%; ▌Neal Marchbanks (Democratic) 18.4%; ▌Chip Peterson (Libertarian) 4.4%
Texas 20	D+6	Joaquín Castro	Democratic	2012	Incumbent re-elected.	▌ ✓ Joaquín Castro (Democratic) 75.7%; ▌Jeffrey C. Blunt (Libertarian) 24.3%
Texas 21	R+12	Lamar S. Smith	Republican	1986	Incumbent re-elected.	▌ ✓ Lamar S. Smith (Republican) 71.8%; ▌Antonio Diaz (Green) 14.7%; ▌Ryan Shields (Libertarian) 13.5%
Texas 22	R+15	Pete Olson	Republican	2008	Incumbent re-elected.	▌ ✓ Pete Olson (Republican) 66.6%; ▌Frank Briscoe (Democratic) 31.6%; ▌Rob Lapham (Libertarian) 1.9%
Texas 23	R+3	Pete Gallego	Democratic	2012	Incumbent lost re-election. Republican gain.	▌ ✓ Will Hurd (Republican) 49.8%; ▌Pete Gallego (Democratic) 47.7%; ▌Ruben S. Corvalan (Libertarian) 2.5%
Texas 24	R+13	Kenny Marchant	Republican	2004	Incumbent re-elected.	▌ ✓ Kenny Marchant (Republican) 65.1%; ▌Patrick McGehearty (Democratic) 32.3%; ▌Mike Kolls (Libertarian) 2.6%
Texas 25	R+12	Roger Williams	Republican	2012	Incumbent re-elected.	▌ ✓ Roger Williams (Republican) 60.2%; ▌Marco Montoya (Democratic) 36.2%; ▌John Betz (Libertarian) 3.5%
Texas 26	R+20	Michael C. Burgess	Republican	2002	Incumbent re-elected.	▌ ✓ Michael C. Burgess (Republican) 82.7%; ▌Mark Boler (Libertarian) 17.3%
Texas 27	R+13	Blake Farenthold	Republican	2010	Incumbent re-elected.	▌ ✓ Blake Farenthold (Republican) 63.6%; ▌Wesley Reed (Democratic) 33.7%; ▌Roxanne Simonson (Libertarian) 2.7%
Texas 28	D+7	Henry Cuellar	Democratic	2004	Incumbent re-elected.	▌ ✓ Henry Cuellar (Democratic) 82.1%; ▌Will Aikens (Libertarian) 13.3%; ▌Michael D. Cary (Green) 4.6%
Texas 29	D+12	Gene Green	Democratic	1992	Incumbent re-elected.	▌ ✓ Gene Green (Democratic) 89.5%; ▌James Stanczak (Libertarian) 10.5%
Texas 30	D+27	Eddie Bernice Johnson	Democratic	1992	Incumbent re-elected.	▌ ✓ Eddie Bernice Johnson (Democratic) 87.9%; ▌Max Koch (Libertarian) 6.8%; ▌Eric Williams (Independent) 5.3%
Texas 31	R+12	John Carter	Republican	2002	Incumbent re-elected.	▌ ✓ John Carter (Republican) 64.1%; ▌Louie Minor (Democratic) 32.0%; ▌Scott Ballard (Libertarian) 4.0%
Texas 32	R+10	Pete Sessions	Republican	1996	Incumbent re-elected.	▌ ✓ Pete Sessions (Republican) 61.8%; ▌Frank Perez (Democratic) 35.4%; ▌Ed Rankin (Libertarian) 2.7%
Texas 33	D+18	Marc Veasey	Democratic	2012	Incumbent re-elected.	▌ ✓ Marc Veasey (Democratic) 86.5%; ▌Jason Reeves (Libertarian) 13.5%
Texas 34	D+8	Filemon Vela Jr.	Democratic	2012	Incumbent re-elected.	▌ ✓ Filemon Vela Jr. (Democratic) 59.5%; ▌Larry Smith (Republican) 38.5%; ▌Ryan Rowley (Libertarian)2.0%
Texas 35	D+11	Lloyd Doggett	Democratic	1994	Incumbent re-elected.	▌ ✓ Lloyd Doggett (Democratic) 62.5%; ▌Susan Narvaiz (Republican) 33.3%; ▌Cory Bruner (Libertarian) 2.9%; ▌Kat Swift (Green) 1.3%
Texas 36	R+25	Steve Stockman	Republican	1994; 1996 (defeated); 2012	Incumbent retired to run for U.S. senator. Republican hold.	▌ ✓ Brian Babin (Republican) 76.0%; ▌Michael Cole (Democratic) 22.0%; ▌Rodney Veach (Libertarian) 1.5%; ▌Hal Ridley Jr. (Green) 0.5%

== Utah ==
District		Incumbent			This race	
Location	PVI	Representative	Party	First elected	Status	Candidates
Utah 1	R+27	Rob Bishop	Republican	2002	Incumbent re-elected.	▌ ✓ Rob Bishop (Republican) 64.2%; ▌Donna McAleer (Democratic) 29.0%; ▌Craig Bowden (Libertarian) 3.6%; ▌Dwayne Vance (Independent American) 3.2%
Utah 2	R+18	Chris Stewart	Republican	2012	Incumbent re-elected.	▌ ✓ Chris Stewart (Republican) 60.4%; ▌Luz Robles (Democratic) 33.2%; ▌Shaun McCausland (Constitution) 3.0%; ▌Wayne Hill (Independent American) 2.3%; ▌Bill Barron (Independent) 1.1%
Utah 3	R+28	Jason Chaffetz	Republican	2008	Incumbent re-elected.	▌ ✓ Jason Chaffetz (Republican) 72.2%; ▌Brian Wonnacott (Democratic) 22.5%; ▌Zack Strong (Independent American) 2.2%; ▌Stephen Tryon (Independent) 1.8%; ▌Ben Mates (Independent) 1.0%
Utah 4	R+16	Jim Matheson	Democratic	2000	Incumbent retired. Republican gain.	▌ ✓ Mia Love (Republican) 50.9%; ▌Doug Owens (Democratic) 45.8%; ▌Tim Aalders (Independent American) 1.4%; ▌Jim Vein (Libertarian) 0.9%; ▌Collin Simonsen (Constitution) 0.9%

== Vermont ==
District		Incumbent			This race	
Location	PVI	Representative	Party	First elected	Status	Candidates
Vermont at-large	D+16	Peter Welch	Democratic	2006	Incumbent re-elected.	▌ ✓ Peter Welch (Democratic) 64.4%; ▌Mark Donka (Republican) 31.0%; ▌Cris Ericson (Independent) 1.4%; ▌Matthew Andrews (Liberty Union) 1.1%; ▌Jerry Trudell (Independent) 1.1%; ▌Randall Meyer (Independent) 0.9%

== Virginia ==
District		Incumbent			This race	
Location	PVI	Representative	Party	First elected	Status	Candidates
Virginia 1	R+6	Rob Wittman	Republican	2007 (special)	Incumbent re-elected.	▌ ✓ Rob Wittman (Republican) 62.9%; ▌Norm Mosher (Democratic) 34.4%; ▌Gail Parker (Independent Green) 2.7%
Virginia 2	R+2	Scott Rigell	Republican	2010	Incumbent re-elected.	▌ ✓ Scott Rigell (Republican) 58.8%; ▌Suzanne Patrick (Democratic) 41.2%
Virginia 3	D+27	Bobby Scott	Democratic	1992	Incumbent re-elected.	▌ ✓ Bobby Scott (Democratic) 94.4%
Virginia 4	R+4	Randy Forbes	Republican	2001 (special)	Incumbent re-elected.	▌ ✓ Randy Forbes (Republican) 60.2%; ▌Elliott Fausz (Democratic) 37.5%; ▌Bo Brown (Libertarian) 2.3%
Virginia 5	R+5	Robert Hurt	Republican	2010	Incumbent re-elected.	▌ ✓ Robert Hurt (Republican) 60.9%; ▌Lawrence Gaughan (Democratic) 35.9%; ▌Paul Jones (Libertarian) 2.1%; ▌Ken Hildebrandt (Independent Green) 1.1%
Virginia 6	R+12	Bob Goodlatte	Republican	1992	Incumbent re-elected.	▌ ✓ Bob Goodlatte (Republican) 75.5%; ▌Will Hammer (Libertarian) 12.5%; ▌Elaine Hildebrandt (Independent Green) 12.0%
Virginia 7	R+10	Vacant			Incumbent Eric Cantor lost renomination then resigned August 18, 2014. Republican hold. Winner also elected to fill unexpired term, see above.	▌ ✓ Dave Brat (Republican) 60.8%; ▌Jack Trammell (Democratic) 37.0%; ▌James Carr (Libertarian) 2.1%
Virginia 8	D+16	Jim Moran	Democratic	1990	Incumbent retired. Democratic hold.	▌ ✓ Don Beyer (Democratic) 63.1%; ▌Micah Edmond (Republican) 31.5%; ▌Gwendolyn Beck (Independent) 2.7%; ▌Jeffrey Carson (Libertarian) 2.2%; ▌Gerard Blais (Independent Green) 0.5%
Virginia 9	R+15	Morgan Griffith	Republican	2010	Incumbent re-elected.	▌ ✓ Morgan Griffith (Republican) 72.2%; ▌William Carr (Independent) 27.8%
Virginia 10	R+2	Frank Wolf	Republican	1980	Incumbent retired. Republican hold.	▌ ✓ Barbara Comstock (Republican) 56.6%; ▌John Foust (Democratic) 40.4%; ▌Bill Redpath (Libertarian) 1.5%; ▌Brad Eickholt (Independent) 1.1%; ▌Dianne Blais (Independent Green) 0.4%
Virginia 11	D+10	Gerry Connolly	Democratic	2008	Incumbent re-elected.	▌ ✓ Gerry Connolly (Democratic) 56.9%; ▌Suzanne Scholte (Republican) 40.4%; ▌Marc Harrold (Libertarian) 1.7%; ▌Joe Galdo (Green) 0.9%

== Washington ==
District		Incumbent			This race	
Location	PVI	Representative	Party	First elected	Status	Candidates
Washington 1	D+4	Suzan DelBene	Democratic	2012	Incumbent re-elected.	▌ ✓ Suzan DelBene (Democratic) 55.0%; ▌Pedro Celis (Republican) 45.0%
Washington 2	D+8	Rick Larsen	Democratic	2000	Incumbent re-elected.	▌ ✓ Rick Larsen (Democratic) 60.6%; ▌B. J. Guillot (Republican) 39.4%
Washington 3	R+2	Jaime Herrera Beutler	Republican	2010	Incumbent re-elected.	▌ ✓ Jaime Herrera Beutler (Republican) 61.5%; ▌Bob Dingethal (Democratic) 38.5%
Washington 4	R+13	Doc Hastings	Republican	1994	Incumbent retired. Republican hold.	▌ ✓ Dan Newhouse (Republican) 50.9%; ▌Clint Didier (Republican) 49.1%
Washington 5	R+7	Cathy McMorris Rodgers	Republican	2004	Incumbent re-elected.	▌ ✓ Cathy McMorris Rodgers (Republican) 60.7%; ▌Joe Pakootas (Democratic) 39.3%
Washington 6	D+5	Derek Kilmer	Democratic	2012	Incumbent re-elected.	▌ ✓ Derek Kilmer (Democratic) 63.0%; ▌Marty McClendon (Republican) 37.0%
Washington 7	D+29	Jim McDermott	Democratic	1988	Incumbent re-elected.	▌ ✓ Jim McDermott (Democratic) 81.0%; ▌Craig Keller (Republican) 19.0%
Washington 8	R+1	Dave Reichert	Republican	2004	Incumbent re-elected.	▌ ✓ Dave Reichert (Republican) 63.3%; ▌Jason Ritchie (Democratic) 36.7%
Washington 9	D+17	Adam Smith	Democratic	1996	Incumbent re-elected.	▌ ✓ Adam Smith (Democratic) 70.8%; ▌Doug Basler (Republican) 29.2%
Washington 10	D+5	Dennis Heck	Democratic	2012	Incumbent re-elected.	▌ ✓ Dennis Heck (Democratic) 54.7%; ▌Joyce McDonald (Republican) 45.3%

== West Virginia ==
District		Incumbent			This race	
Location	PVI	Representative	Party	First elected	Status	Candidates
West Virginia 1	R+14	David McKinley	Republican	2010	Incumbent re-elected.	▌ ✓ David McKinley (Republican) 64.0%; ▌Glen Gainer (Democratic) 36.0%
West Virginia 2	R+11	Shelley Moore Capito	Republican	2000	Incumbent retired to run for U.S. senator. Republican hold.	▌ ✓ Alex Mooney (Republican) 47.1%; ▌Nick Casey (Democratic) 43.9%; ▌Davy Jones (Libertarian) 5.0%; ▌Ed Rabel (Independent) 4.0%
West Virginia 3	R+14	Nick Rahall	Democratic	1976	Incumbent lost re-election. Republican gain.	▌ ✓ Evan Jenkins (Republican) 55.3%; ▌Nick Rahall (Democratic) 44.7%

== Wisconsin ==
District		Incumbent			This race	
Location	PVI	Representative	Party	First elected	Status	Candidates
Wisconsin 1	R+3	Paul Ryan	Republican	1998	Incumbent re-elected.	▌ ✓ Paul Ryan (Republican) 63.3%; ▌Rob Zerban (Democratic) 36.7%
Wisconsin 2	D+17	Mark Pocan	Democratic	2012	Incumbent re-elected.	▌ ✓ Mark Pocan (Democratic) 68.5%; ▌Peter Theron (Republican) 31.5%
Wisconsin 3	D+5	Ron Kind	Democratic	1996	Incumbent re-elected.	▌ ✓ Ron Kind (Democratic) 56.5%; ▌Tony Kurtz (Republican) 43.5%
Wisconsin 4	D+23	Gwen Moore	Democratic	2004	Incumbent re-elected.	▌ ✓ Gwen Moore (Democratic) 70.2%; ▌Dan Sebring (Republican) 26.9%; ▌Robert Raymond (Independent) 2.9%
Wisconsin 5	R+13	Jim Sensenbrenner	Republican	1978	Incumbent re-elected.	▌ ✓ Jim Sensenbrenner (Republican) 69.5%; ▌Chris Rockwood (Democratic) 30.5%
Wisconsin 6	R+5	Tom Petri	Republican	1979 (special)	Incumbent retired. Republican hold.	▌ ✓ Glenn Grothman (Republican) 56.8%; ▌Mark Harris (Democratic) 40.9%; ▌Gus Fahrendorf (Libertarian) 2.3%
Wisconsin 7	R+2	Sean Duffy	Republican	2010	Incumbent re-elected.	▌ ✓ Sean Duffy (Republican) 59.3%; ▌Kelly Westlund (Democratic) 39.4%; ▌Lawrence Dale (Green)1.3%
Wisconsin 8	R+2	Reid Ribble	Republican	2010	Incumbent re-elected.	▌ ✓ Reid Ribble (Republican) 65.0%; ▌Ron Gruett (Democratic) 35.0%

== Wyoming ==
District		Incumbent			This race	
Location	PVI	Representative	Party	First elected	Status	Candidates
Wyoming at-large	R+22	Cynthia Lummis	Republican	2008	Incumbent re-elected.	▌ ✓ Cynthia Lummis (Republican) 68.5%; ▌Richard Grayson (Democratic) 23.0%; ▌Richard Brubaker (Libertarian) 4.3%; ▌Daniel Cummings (Constitution) 4.1%

== Non-voting delegates ==
District		Incumbent			This race	
Location	PVI	Delegate	Party	First elected	Results	Candidates
American Samoa at-large	N/A	Eni Faleomavaega	Democratic	1988	Incumbent lost re-election. New delegate elected. Republican gain.	▌ ✓ Aumua Amata Radewagen (Republican) 42.03%; ▌Eni Faleomavaega (Democratic) 30.81%; ▌Togiola Tulafono (Democratic) 11.03%; ▌Mapu J. Jamias (Democratic) 6.36%; ▌Rosie Tago Lancaster (Independent) 2.62%; ▌Meleagi Suitonu-Chapman (Democratic) 2.24%; ▌Tuika Tuika Jr. (Independent) 1.96%; ▌Tuaau Kereti Mata'utia (Democratic) 1.56%; ▌Mark Ude (Democratic) 1.40%
District of Columbia at-large	D+41	Eleanor Holmes Norton	Democratic	1990	Incumbent re-elected.	▌ ✓ Eleanor Holmes Norton (Democratic) 83.92%; ▌Nelson Rimensnyder (Republican) 6.63%; ▌Tim Krepp (Independent) 5.34%; ▌Natale Stracuzzi (DC Statehood Green) 3.44%
Guam at-large	N/A	Madeleine Bordallo	Democratic	2002	Incumbent re-elected.	▌ ✓ Madeleine Bordallo (Democratic) 60.5%; ▌Margaret Metcalfe (Republican) 39.5%
Northern Mariana Islands at-large	N/A	Gregorio Sablan	Independent	2008	Incumbent re-elected.	▌ ✓ Gregorio Sablan (Independent) 65.28%; ▌Andrew Salas (Democratic) 34.72%
United States Virgin Islands at-large	N/A	Donna Christian-Christensen	Democratic	1996	Incumbent retired to run for Governor of the U.S. Virgin Islands. New delegate elected. Democratic hold.	▌ ✓ Stacey Plaskett (Democratic) 90.64%; ▌Vince Danet (Republican) 8.71%

== See also ==
- 2014 United States elections
  - 2014 United States gubernatorial elections
  - 2014 United States Senate elections
- 113th United States Congress
- 114th United States Congress
