= Arthur D. Hershey =

American politician (born 1937)

Member of the Pennsylvania House of Representatives from the 13th district
- In office January 4, 1983 – November 30, 2008
- Preceded by: Earl Smith
- Succeeded by: Tom Houghton

Personal details
- Born: November 14, 1937 (age 88) Kinzers, Pennsylvania
- Party: Republican
- Spouse: Joyce
- Children: 4 children, 11 grandchildren
- Education: Penn State University

Arthur D. "Art" Hershey (born November 14, 1937) was a Republican member of the Pennsylvania House of Representatives for the 13th District and was elected in 1982. He and his wife, Joyce, live in Cochranville, Pennsylvania and have 4 children and 11 grandchildren. He retired prior to the 2008 election, and was succeeded by Democrat Tom Houghton.
