= Tom Houghton =

American politician

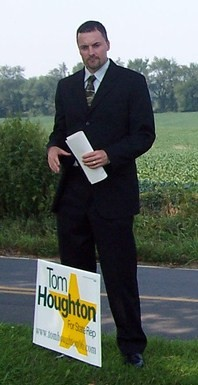
- Houghton during his 2006 campaign

Member of the Pennsylvania House of Representatives from the 13th district
- In office January 6, 2009 – November 30, 2010
- Preceded by: Art Hershey
- Succeeded by: John Lawrence

Personal details
- Born: Philadelphia, Pennsylvania
- Party: Democratic
- Education: La Salle University; Widener University (JD)
- Occupation: Attorney

Thomas D. Houghton is a Democratic politician and former member of the Pennsylvania House of Representatives. He represented the 13th district from 2009 through 2010.

== Professional career ==
Tom is a personal injury and criminal defense attorney. He has served as London Grove Township's representative on the executive committee to PennDOT's Route 41, is a board member of the White Clay Creek Watershed Association.

== Political career ==
=== Township Supervisor ===
In 2001, Houghton was elected to the London Grove Township Board of Supervisors. He served as chairman of that body for several years. He was re-elected in 2007.

=== State House Campaigns ===
Houghton first ran for the 13th district seat in 2006. He was defeated by Republican incumbent Art Hershey by 1,800 votes.

On November 4, 2008, he was elected to the State House, succeeding Hershey, who had declined to run for reelection. He defeated his main opponent, John Lawrence, by a margin of 47.5% to 46.4%.

Houghton's original opponent, Curtis Mason, was forced to drop out of the race. In the end, he narrowly defeated his opponent in a count that stretched into the morning following election day.

In the 2010 election, Houghton was defeated by over 2,000 (over 10%) votes by his opponent from two years prior, John Lawrence.

=== State House Career ===
Houghton served on the Agriculture and Rural Affairs Committee, as well as the Children and Youth, Environmental Resources and Energy and the Local Government Committees. He was also appointed to the Joint Legislative Air and Water Pollution Control and Conservation Committee by the Speaker of the House.

=== Political future ===
Houghton originally announced his intention to challenge Republican State Senate Majority Leader Dominic Pileggi in 2012. However, due to redistricting, Houghton's home was drawn out of Pileggi's 9th District seat, and moved into the 19th District, currently represented by Democrat Andy Dinniman. Houghton subsequently announced his intention to challenge Dinniman in the Democratic primary. Houghton ran for Congress in 2014, challenging Republican incumbent Joe Pitts in Pennsylvania's 16th congressional district.

Pennsylvania House of Representatives
Preceded by Art Hershey	Member of the Pennsylvania House of Representatives for the 13th District; 2009–2010	Succeeded by John Lawrence
