= Janek Ambros =

American film director and screenwriter

- Born: April 19, 1988 (age 38); Morristown, New Jersey, United States
- Education: The Albany Academy; Siena College; New York Film Academy (M.F.A.)
- Occupations: Director, screenwriter, producer
- Years active: 2011–present
- Notable work: Mondo Hollywoodland; Ukrainians in Exile; Imminent Threat
- Website: Official website

Janek Ambros (born April 19, 1988) is an American film director, producer and screenwriter based in Los Angeles, California. He is also the founder of Assembly Line Entertainment, an American film production company. Ambros is widely known for directing award-winning documentary films like Imminent Threat, Mondo Hollywoodland and Ukrainians in Exile.

== Biography ==
=== Early life and education ===
Ambros was born in 1988, in Morristown, New Jersey. He attended The Albany Academy where he completed his early education in 2006. He received his bachelor's degree in economics from Siena College in 2010. Later, he attended New York Film Academy where he earned his Master of Fine Arts degree in 2012.

=== Career ===
After graduating from Siena College, Ambros founded his film production company, Assembly Line Entertainment in 2011, in Los Angeles, California. He co-produced Asa Butterfield and Ethan Hawke starrer drama film Ten Thousand Saints in 2015. The film had its world premiere at the Sundance Film Festival on January 23, 2015.

In September 2015, Ambros collaborated with James Cromwell for his directorial debut, Imminent Threat. He also wrote and produced the film. Imminent Threat is a documentary film about the war on terror's impact on civil liberties in the United States.

In 2017, Ambros produced and directed a French short film, Le Quinze Mai à Paris (May 15th in Paris). The film received positive response and was nominated for awards at several film festivals around the world. Later that year, he produced Valley of Bones featuring Autumn Reeser and Rhys Coiro.

In 2019, Ambros collaborated with James Cromwell for the second time and directed Mondo Hollywoodland, a comedy/sci fi film. The film was released theatrically and on VOD in 2021. The film won the Jury Prize for Creative Vision at the Downtown Los Angeles Film Festival. Later in 2019, Ambros co-produced Human Capital, an American-Italian drama film directed by Marc Meyers and starring Liev Schreiber. In 2022, Ambros executive produced Monica. The film was premiered at the 79th Venice International Film Festival and was nominated for the Golden Lion.

In October 2022, Ambros directed Ukrainians in Exile, a war documentary film shot in the Polish city of Przemysl. The film was executive produced by two time Academy Award winner Janusz Kaminski. The film premiered at the Morelia International Film Festival on 23 October 2022. Ukrainians in Exile was awarded with the Best Documentary Award at the 76th Salerno Film Festival in December 2022.

In 2023, Ambros was awarded the Filmmaker Auteur Award at the Roots of Europe film festival for his various films. Previous receipts include Krzysztof Zanussi, Inma Shara and painter-sculptor Antonio López.

He produced the film In the Summers, which won the Grand Jury Prize at the Sundance Film Festival in 2024 and for which he was nominated for an Independent Spirit Award for Best First Feature in 2025.

Ambros collaborated with his frequent creative partner James Cromwell for Nixon's Nixon, an adaptation of Russell Lees' play. The film was scheduled for release in 2024.

== Filmography ==
Filmography
Year	Title	Notes
2015	Ten Thousand Saints	Co-producer
2015	Imminent Threat	Director, writer, producer
2017	Le Quinze Mai à Paris (May 15th in Paris)	Director, producer
2017	Valley of Bones	Producer
2019	Human Capital	Co-producer
2019	Mondo Hollywoodland	Director, writer, producer
2020	Money, Fascism and Some Sort of Acid	Director, writer, producer
2022	La Leyenda de Tayos	Producer
2022	Monica	Executive producer
2022	Magoado	Executive producer
2022	Exposure 36	Executive producer
2022	Ukrainians in Exile	Director, producer
2024	In the Summers	producer
2026	Off to the Races	producer
2026	Night Trader	Director, producer
2026	Desert Angel	producer

- Source
