= Thaddeus McCotter 2012 presidential campaign =

American political campaign

McCotter 2012
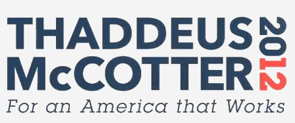
- Campaign: 2012 United States presidential election
- Candidate: Thaddeus McCotter; U.S. Representative from Michigan's 11th district (2003-2012)
- Affiliation: Republican Party
- Headquarters: Livonia, Michigan
- Key people: Mark Corallo (adviser); Christopher Marston (treasurer); Christopher Rants (adviser)
- Receipts: US$550,437 (June 30, 2012)
- Slogan: Seize Freedom!

Website
- mccotter2012.com (archived October 5, 2011)

U.S. Representative Thaddeus McCotter of Michigan unsuccessfully sought the Republican Party's 2012 nomination for president of the United States. He announced his intention to run when he filed papers with the Federal Election Commission on July 1, 2011, and officially declared his candidacy the next day at a rock festival near Detroit.

McCotter, who had served in Congress since 2003, was first mentioned as a potential presidential candidate on an April 2011 episode of Fox News' Red Eye w/ Greg Gutfeld. After entering the race two months later, McCotter based his campaign on "five core principles" listed on his campaign website, and used the slogan Seize Freedom!, derived from the title of his 2011 book. During the campaign, he focused on government reform and Wall Street.

Commentators noted that McCotter's lack of name recognition hindered his chances for nomination. When included in Republican presidential preference polls, he regularly received less than one percent support. Following a last-place finish in the Ames Straw Poll and without an invitation to any candidates' debates, he dropped his candidacy on September 22, 2011, and endorsed Mitt Romney. Thereafter, McCotter reportedly wrote a television pilot, which was released to the media prior to his resignation from Congress in July 2012 amid a fraud investigation surrounding his congressional re-election campaign.

== Background ==
Thaddeus McCotter began his political career upon election to the Wayne County (Michigan) Commission in 1993. Five years later, he left that position after winning a seat in the Michigan State Senate. He remained there until 2002 when elected to serve Michigan's 11th congressional district in the United States House of Representatives.

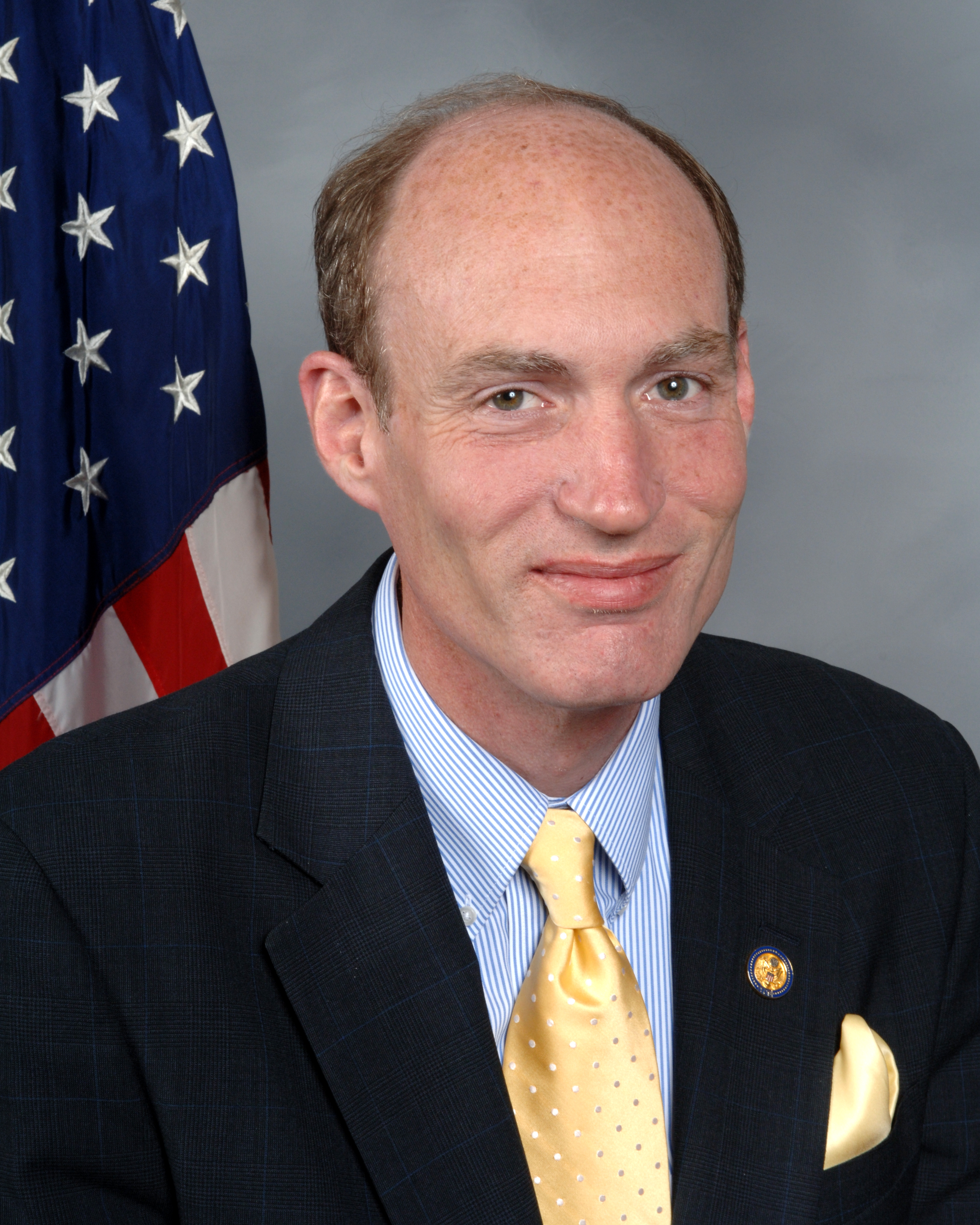
Official Congressional photo of Thaddeus McCotter

In Congress, leadership assigned McCotter to the House Financial Services Committee. In addition, he joined the moderate Republican Main Street Partnership. In 2006, he attained the chairmanship of the House Republican Policy Committee, and two years later was named head of his party's Fiscal Integrity Task Force. On the task force, he gained a reputation as a leading opponent of pork barrel spending. He voted against the Emergency Economic Stabilization Act of 2008 and the Affordable Health Care for America Act of 2010, but supported the bailout of the automobile industry in 2009. He also supported an increase in the minimum wage and advocated fair trade with China. Nevertheless, the Detroit Free Press described him as a "conservative's conservative" and GovTrack labeled him a "far-right Republican".

McCotter was also known as an "oddball" in Congress, displaying a wry sense of humor. Betsy Woodruff of National Review identified him as "the strangest Congressman." Showing a fondness for rock music, he played lead guitar in the Second Amendments. Moreover, McCotter frequently appeared on Fox News' late night/early morning show Red Eye w/ Greg Gutfeld. Bloomberg Businessweek described his celebrity as a "tiny cult following of insomniac conservatives."

== Campaign speculation ==
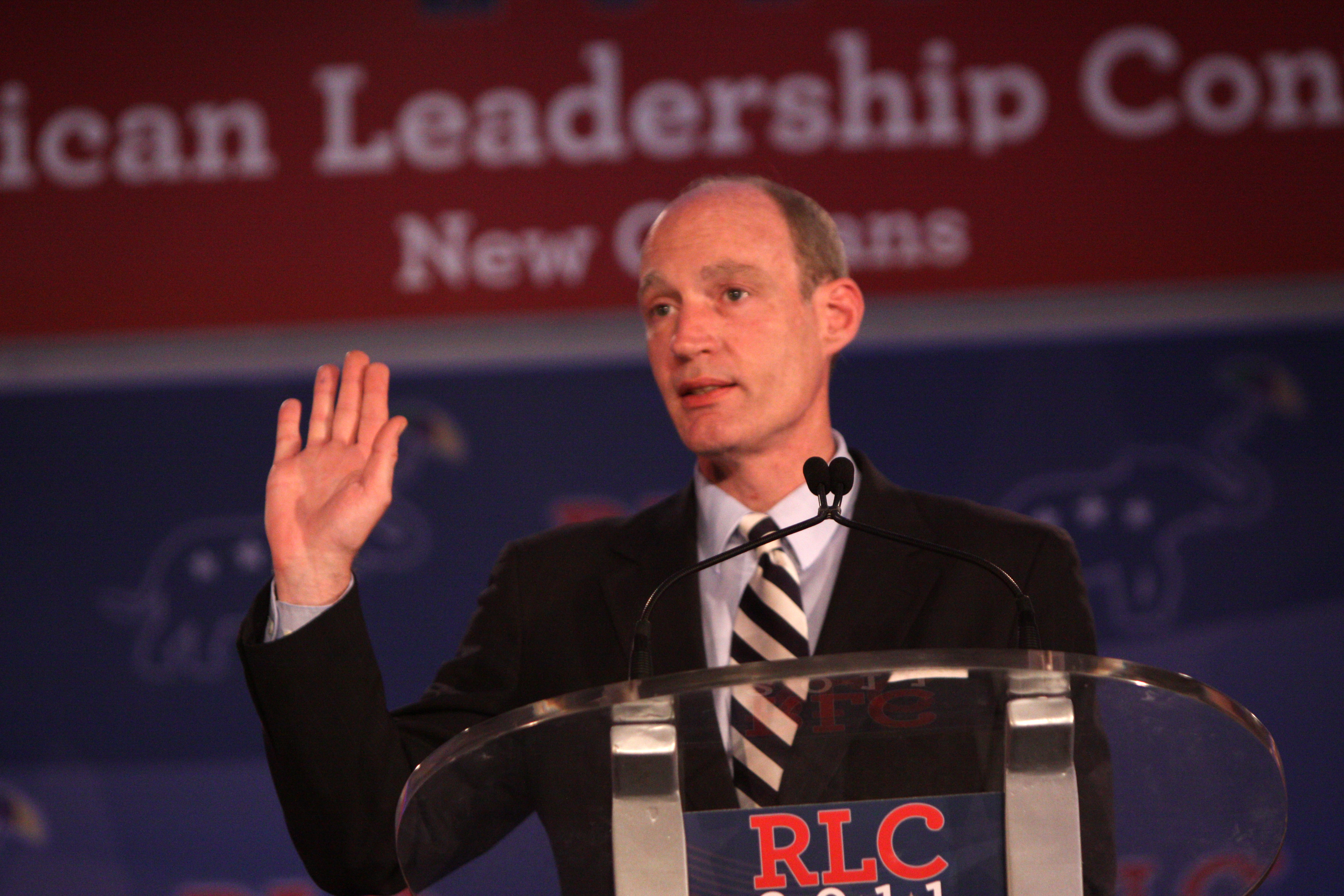
McCotter addresses the Republican Leadership Conference on June 16, 2011

Speculation about a presidential run began several months after the release of his February 2011 book Seize Freedom! American Truths and Renewal in a Chaotic Age. During the April 22 episode of Red Eye, host Greg Gutfeld asked McCotter to enter the presidential race. Five days later, political commentator and fellow Red Eye frequenter S. E. Cupp listed McCotter as a potential candidate in her Daily News column. McCotter confirmed in May that he was seriously considering a run for the presidency. He told the newspaper Politico he felt most Republicans lacked enthusiasm for the current crop of candidates. Commentator Andrew Breitbart expressed excitement at the prospect of a McCotter run. Describing him as "blunt, sarcastic, pop-culture-savvy, constitutionally sound and an authentic voice", Breitbart remarked "[t]here's no one I'd like to see more at a debate than McCotter."

In May 2011, speculation increased as McCotter attacked Republican front-runner Mitt Romney as the latter visited Detroit. He connected Romney to President Barack Obama, arguing that people saw Romney and Obama as running mates rather than as rivals. Later that month, he addressed the Republican Leadership Conference in New Orleans and entered the event's straw poll. Out of the 1,542 votes cast, he received two, last place among those considered. At this time, McCotter remained undecided about a run, according to his aides, though he paid $18,000 for a prime spot at the August 13 Ames Straw Poll. During a visit to Iowa, the first caucus state, McCotter announced he would reveal his campaign plans prior to the straw poll. On June 30, Politico reported McCotter was ready to begin a campaign.

== Campaign developments ==
=== Announcement ===
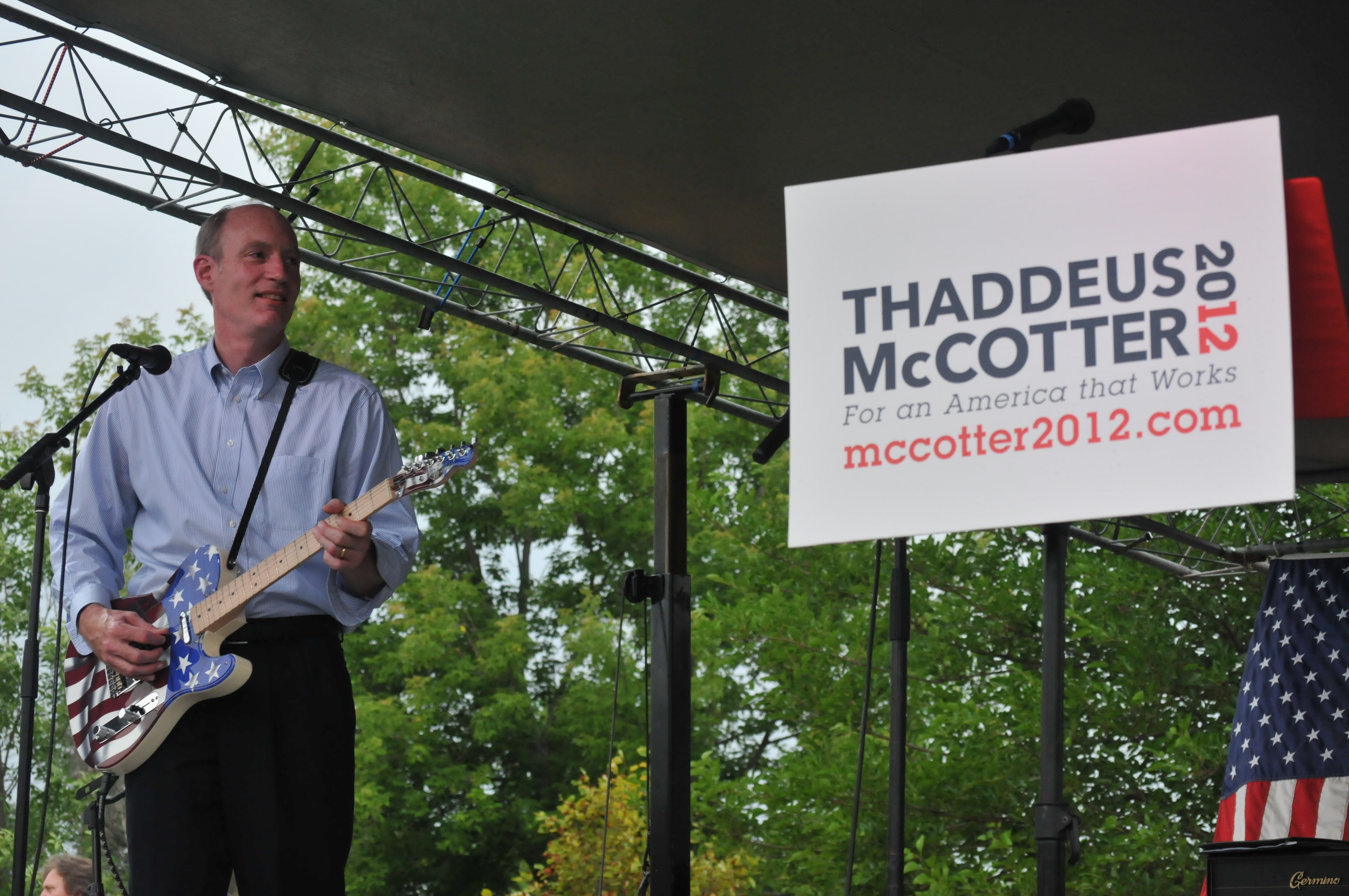
McCotter plays guitar at his presidential announcement during the WAAM-sponsored "Freedom Festival"

External videos
- Thaddeus McCotter Presidential Campaign Announcement, July 2, 2011, C-SPAN

McCotter filed a presidential campaign committee statement with the Federal Election Commission (FEC) and opened a campaign website on July 1, 2011. The website, which warned "your American Dream is endangered" was based on his book Seize Freedom! and listed "five core principles". These were:

1. "Our liberty is from God not the government"
2. "Our sovereignty is in our souls not the soil"
3. "Our security is from strength not surrender"
4. "Our prosperity is from the private sector not the public sector"
5. "Our truths are self-evident not relative"

McCotter officially announced his candidacy at the WAAM-sponsored "Freedom Festival" in Whitmore Lake, Michigan on July 2. He declared, "what we need in Washington is someone who understands that the wave of the future is not big government, but self-government". He played with his rock band at the event. Upon his entrance, Charlie Cook of The Cook Political Report rated McCotter's chances of nomination as "virtually impossible". CBS News and other outlets commented on McCotter's lack of name recognition and described him as a "little-known" candidate. Nevertheless, the Free Press noted he had about $480,000 available in his congressional account to transfer to his presidential campaign account. Political communications operative Mark Corallo was hired along with a core group of advisers that included former Senator Bill Frist's chief of staff Eric Ueland, and former Iowa representative Christopher Rants.

=== Campaign events ===
As McCotter embarked on his first official campaign trip to the first-in-the-nation primary state of New Hampshire, he received media attention for his hometown newspaper's reaction to his run. An editorial in The Oakland Press, based out of Oakland County, Michigan, wrote that the idea of a McCotter presidency "isn't a pleasant thought and is, in fact, a bit scary". It added, "the representative comes off as cold, arrogant and egotistical". Nevertheless, McCotter continued his campaign in New Hampshire, focusing on the "fundamental restructuring of government". Radio host Chris Buck was hired as leader of operations in New Hampshire.

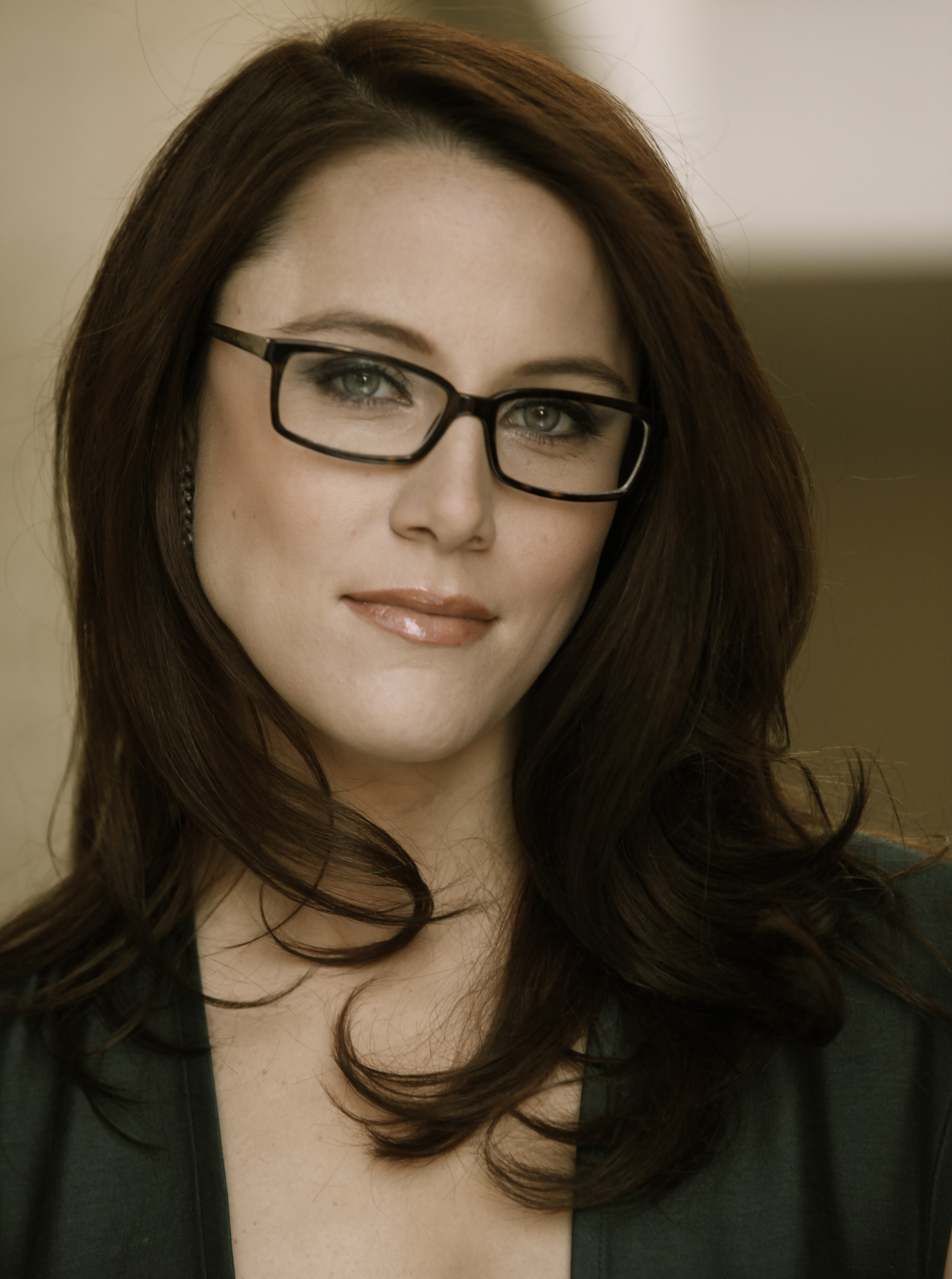
Political commentator S. E. Cupp (pictured in 2010) first mentioned McCotter as a potential candidate, accompanied him in New Hampshire, and moderated the Twitter debate.

McCotter returned to Iowa in mid-July for further campaign events. Around this time, Chris Cillizza of The Washington Post placed McCotter's odds of winning the Ames Straw Poll at one hundred to one, last place among the candidates listed. A Harris poll conducted July 11–18 found that 92 percent of voters were not familiar with McCotter, and less than one percent supported him when matched against his fellow presidential contenders. In a hypothetical head-to-head matchup with President Obama, McCotter received 43 percent, compared to 57 percent for Obama. To build support, McCotter used Twitter, with which he attempted to bypass the news media and connect directly with supporters. Campaign spokesman Randall Thompson stated that McCotter was "relying on social media ... [and] ... developed a very loyal following".

McCotter participated in the first-ever Twitter presidential debate, on July 20, against fellow candidates former New Mexico governor Gary Johnson, businessman Herman Cain, representative Michele Bachmann, former Speaker of the House Newt Gingrich, and former Senator Rick Santorum. At one point, moderator S. E. Cupp asked whether President Obama was anti-Israel, McCotter answered, "Obama's motivations are not the issue, the impact of his policies, both proposed and pursued, have strained our relationship" with Israel. When asked to comment on the U.S. role in the 2011 military intervention in Libya, McCotter referred to the Obama administration's mission as "ill-defined," and argued for "no US boots on ground." He, however, added the caveat, "once committed [to the mission], we can't abruptly withdraw."

In late July, during the height of the debt ceiling crisis, McCotter canceled several appearances in Iowa and returned to Washington. He supported the plan of House Speaker John Boehner, and voted in favor of the compromise bill. He was the only presidential candidate in the House of Representatives to approve the bill in Congress since both fellow members Bachmann and Ron Paul voted against it.

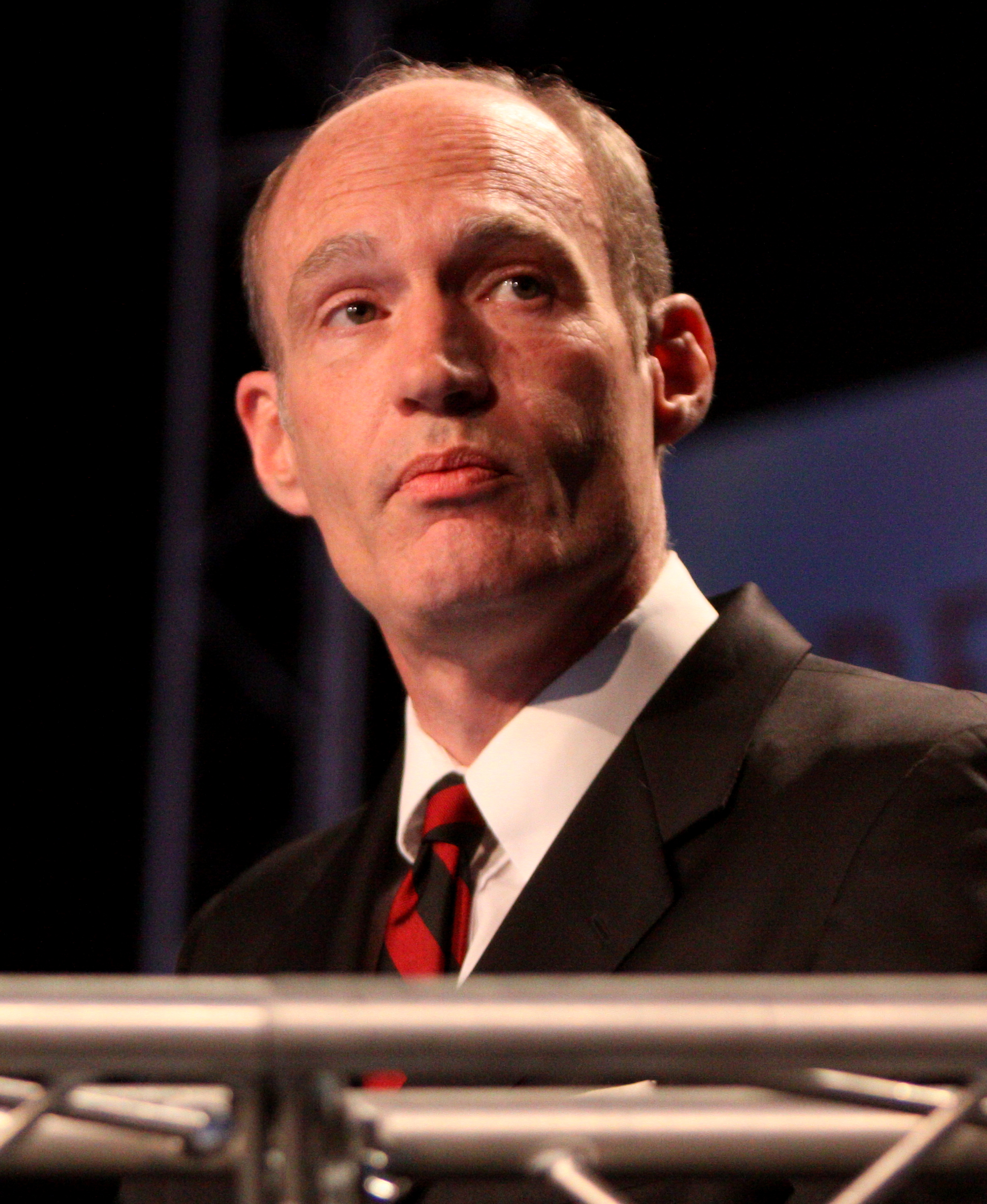
McCotter speaks at the Ames Straw Poll in August 2011

Ahead of the Ames Straw Poll, McCotter had not reached the one percent polling threshold necessary to participate in the event's August 11 debate on Fox News. At the time, McCotter had little support, even in his home state. Public Policy Polling showed him with only five percent from Michigan Republicans, a figure pollsters described as rare coming from a candidate's home state. With news of his standing, McCotter canceled a scheduled stop in New Hampshire, and returned to his headquarters in Michigan to coordinate a debate inclusion effort. As part of the effort, the campaign filmed a YouTube video in a kitchen, featuring McCotter making puns about food, and concluding with "Thanks, dude." The Los Angeles Times described the video as "unfortunate". Despite the effort, McCotter did not meet the polling threshold and was excluded. He was the only candidate missing from the debate that had secured a spot on the ballot.

Just before the vote at Ames, McCotter addressed voters in what Politico described as "a slow, abstract, exceptionally sober speech". It drew little crowd reaction other than applause at the denunciation of the "regime in Beijing" and the proclamation, "I will not cede the 21st Century to a Communist, nuclear-armed dictatorship." At his tent, McCotter spent a large amount of time playing guitar. In the straw poll, he finished last among ten candidates, receiving 35 votes (0.21 percent). Based on the $18,000 he paid for campaign space, the result corresponded to $514 per vote. Senior adviser Christopher Rants explained that the purpose of the straw poll "was not about votes, it was about introducing our candidate to the public in our first large forum... By any measure, we did that".

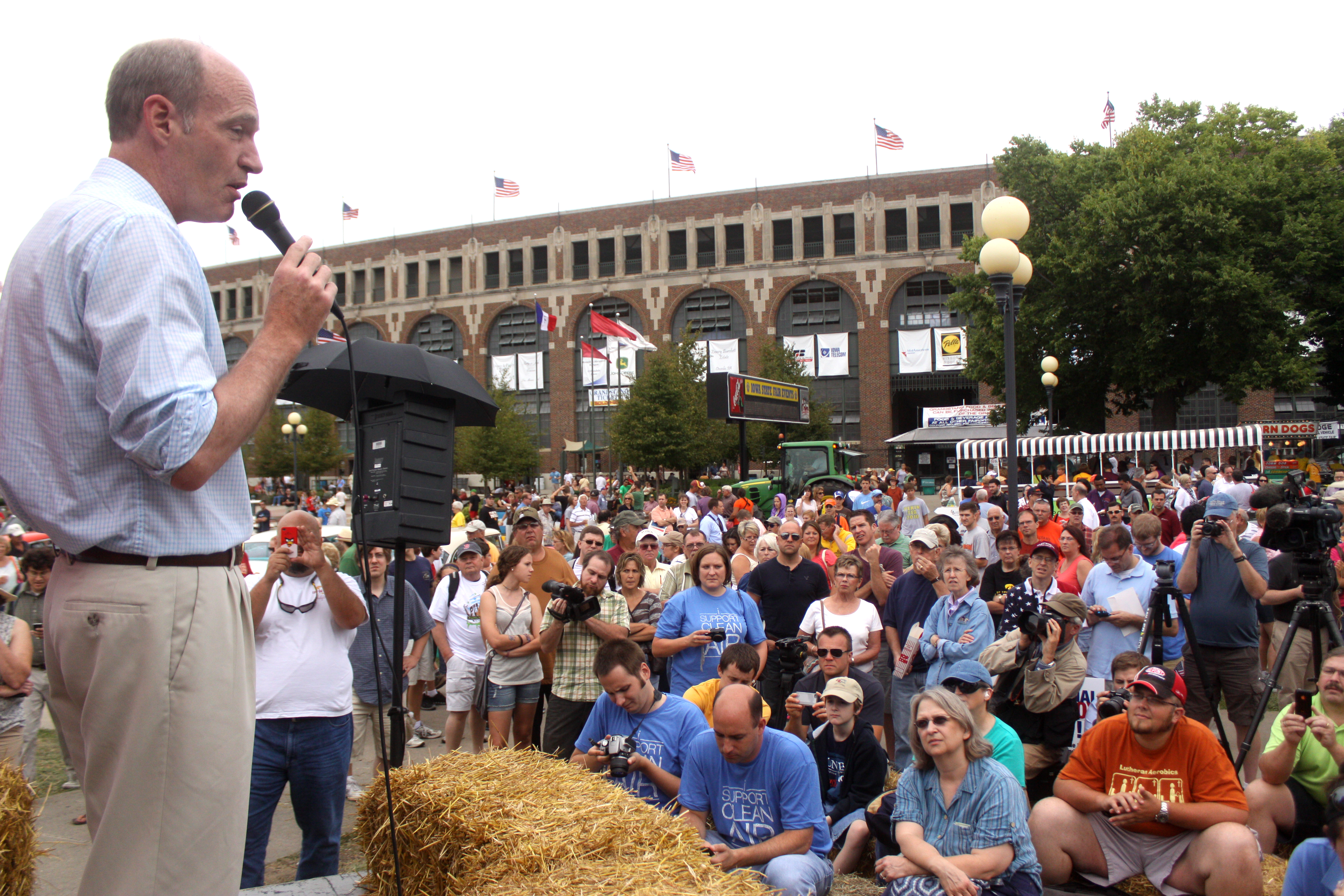
McCotter campaigns at the Iowa State Fair in August 2011

Three days after the straw poll, McCotter wrote an article in National Review outlining some of his economic plans. He advocated spending reductions, a twenty percent reserve requirement for banks to keep available as capital, and incentives to reduce home foreclosures. He campaigned in New Hampshire on August 19, and filmed "Conversation with the Candidate" for WMUR-TV. The next day, he attended a party with S. E. Cupp for the Young Republicans of Seacoast. He returned to Iowa for his last campaign stop in the state from August 24 to 27. At the end of the month, McCotter appeared on the Dennis Miller Show and talked about his exclusion from debates. He failed to meet the requirements for both the September 7 MSNBC and the September 12 CNN debates. For the MSNBC debate, a candidate had to show one poll with four percent support. McCotter argued that while he did not meet this, in a Quinnipiac poll, he tied with Rick Santorum and Jon Huntsman Jr., both of whom qualified. Other candidates who did not qualify included Gary Johnson and former Louisiana governor Buddy Roemer, who like McCotter, did not qualify for any televised debates.

On September 9, McCotter made his last campaign trip to New Hampshire, attending events for two days. He was supposed to appear in Iowa again five days later, but had to cancel due to a vote in Congress. While in Washington, he introduced a Grover Norquist-backed Social Security reform plan, which would have created private accounts for those under 50 years of age with limited guaranteed government benefits. He called on the other Republican presidential candidates to release their plans on Social Security. Shortly thereafter, McCotter participated in the California Republican Convention. In a speech there, he criticized Obama, arguing, "No matter how many times his campaign clown car crisscrosses America, we know that the most prosperous and equitable economy in human history was created by you, the American people, not by bureaucrats in Washington." At the event's straw poll, he received less than one percent of the vote. McCotter tried to gain entry into the September 22 Fox News debate, but reported via Twitter, "@Foxnews has kindly advised me I will be excluded from the Orlando GOP POTUS debate."

=== Withdrawal ===
On September 22, 2011, McCotter notified The Detroit News he would withdraw from the presidential race. He explained it "was sort of death by media" because of the exclusion from the presidential debates, and argued "if they keep you out of the debates, you are out of the conversation and you can't run." He then released a statement in which he endorsed Mitt Romney for president, and called on the Republican Party to unite behind Romney as the most electable candidate. In the press release, McCotter also announced that he would run for re-election in his congressional district.

In reporting on the withdrawal, the Los Angeles Times wrote, "What's that? You've never heard of Thaddeus McCotter? Well, that's the main reason he's now a former candidate." Pundit Bill Ballenger of Inside Michigan Politics said that McCotter "really had no business running for president. If he wants to have any political future, endorsing Mitt Romney now is the smart thing to do." McCotter's neighbor, former Michigan Attorney General Mike Cox, remarked, "He tried it out, obviously it wasn't working. And he's doing the rational thing and dropping out." Steve Kornacki of Salon summarized the overall campaign as "a cautionary tale about what can go wrong when your average backbench member of Congress becomes a minor cable news celebrity and mistakes it for having a genuine national following."

== Aftermath ==
A few days after the campaign ended, The Detroit News asked McCotter whether he enjoyed his presidential campaign, he replied, "No. It was the worst 15 minutes of my life." Fundraising totals for the three months of McCotter's run were released to the FEC in October 2011. Overall, he raised $548,606 ($468,561 of which was transferred from authorized committees), paid $541,532 on expenses, and had a debt of $105,367. As of the campaign's termination in 2019, a debt of $105,636 remained.

In an interview with GQ ahead of the Michigan primary in February 2012, McCotter expressed concern that Republicans were underestimating the strength of Democrats, and that winning in the Midwest would be difficult because of the Republicans' position on manufacturing and the Wall Street bailout. He maintained that though he disagreed with Romney on the auto industry bailout, Romney had the best chance to overcome the obstacles.

Though McCotter had decided to run for reelection in his congressional district, he failed to qualify for his district's Republican primary after the majority of his petitions were declared fraudulent. An investigation of the campaign by the office of the Michigan Attorney General ensued. Steve Kornacki suggested the fraud may have been related to the presidential campaign, if it "caused him to take his eye off the ball on his House reelection," but McCotter rejected this as an "idiotic line of thinking." He initially hoped to wage a write-in campaign, but decided against it, finding he could not run the campaign while cooperating with the investigation and serving the remainder of his term in Congress. A month later, he resigned from Congress, claiming this was needed to fully assist with the petition fraud investigation. The investigation found that in addition to the 2012 petitions, McCotter's Congressional reelection petitions from 2006, 2008, and 2010, also showed evidence of fraud. McCotter sued two aides accusing them of deliberate obstruction. Eventually, four aides, including one who was sued, were charged and convicted of violations related to the fraud.

A day prior to his resignation from Congress, The Detroit News reported that after ending his presidential campaign, McCotter took to writing a television pilot he titled, "Bumper Sticker: Made On Motown". It centered on McCotter as the host of a variety show with characters based on his congressional staffers, who made fun of his presidential campaign and discussed such risqué topics as sex, race, and bodily functions. In one scene in the script, S. E. Cupp guest stars; McCotter tries to conduct a serious interview with her, but the other characters make sexually explicit comments, leading Cupp to describe the show as a "train wreck." A former staffer released the work to the media to show what McCotter did while in office. In response, McCotter denied any wrongdoing, saying it had been largely composed in his garage as a way to get over his failed presidential campaign. He said the script was unfinished and had not authorized it for release, but decided to discuss it with The News. He cited comedian Martin Mull's short-lived 1977 show Fernwood 2 Night as an inspiration, and revealed that he had planned to leave Congress in 2014 and was preparing for a future career.
