= Minyong Kim =

South Korean actor

- 김민용
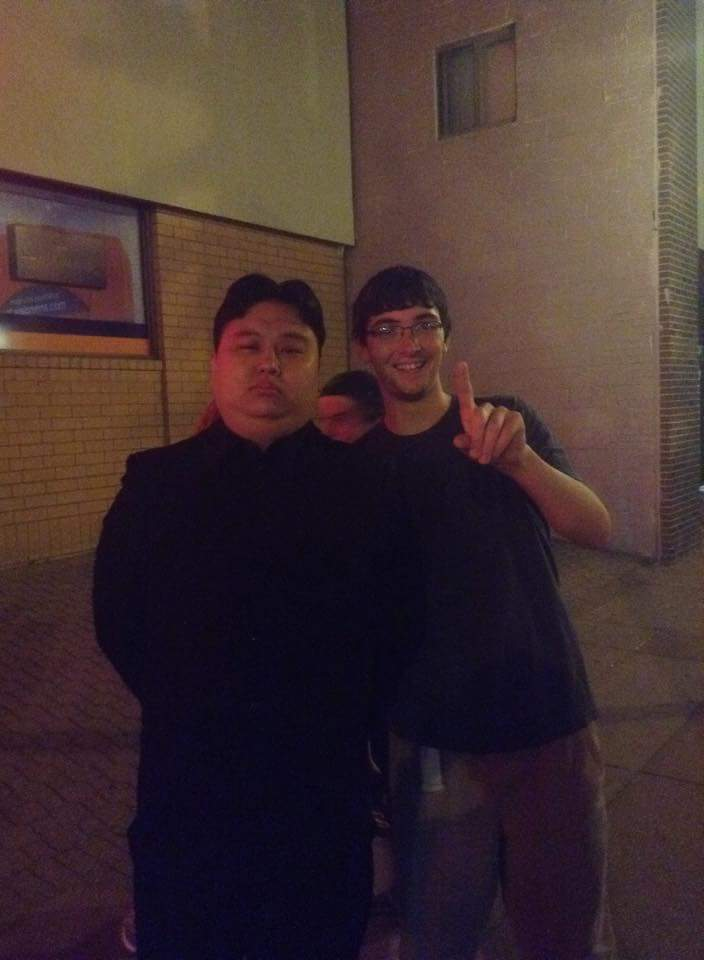
- Kim poses with a student
- Born: 1989 or 1990 (age 35–36)
- Other name: Dragon
- Citizenship: South Korea
- Education: University of Illinois at Urbana-Champaign
- Known for: Impersonation of Kim Jong Un

Minyong Kim (Korean: 김민용; sometimes known as Dragon) is an impersonator of Kim Jong Un, the supreme leader of North Korea. His impersonation gained attention when he was an undergraduate student at the University of Illinois at Urbana-Champaign.

== Impersonator career ==
Kim was born in Seoul to a working class family and studied business at the University of Illinois. He first enrolled at the university in 2009, then went back to South Korea for 25 months to complete mandatory military service in the Korean Air Force. He remained in South Korea to work as a teacher and save money, and when he returned to university classes in spring 2013 studied abroad in China which was cheaper for him. In 2014, his Kim Jong Un Halloween costume went viral on Korean social media.

He decided to capitalize on his resemblance to Kim Jong Un by gaining weight, buying a black Mao suit, and getting a trapezoidal haircut. Kim told USA Today that he got stopped on the University of Illinois campus more than 100 times per day by people who wanted photos. Several weeks later, he told a reporter the number was "200 to 300 times per day, usually like 40 to 50 times per hour." His reason for impersonating the North Korean leader, he said, is to make people happy.

Kim does not agree with Kim Jong Un's politics but he shares the supreme leader's interest in the Chicago Bulls. Because of Kim Jong Un's divisiveness, Minyong Kim said his parents feared he would be kidnapped or assassinated. He told the Champaign News-Gazette, "my girlfriend really abhors this... not only hates it, but abhors."

After Kim's graduation in late 2015, he began running an agency that prepares South Korean students for school in the United States. His career goal is to expand affordable education options in South Korea.

=== Film, television, and advertising ===
His resemblance to Kim Jong Un has earned him roles in movies, commercials, soap operas, and music videos. In April 2015, he and a Barack Obama impersonator named Reggie Brown, who also attended the University of Illinois, appeared in commercial for eNuri, a South Korean online marketplace. In a commercial for an air purifier, he acted like he was creating new weapons to destroy germs in the air. In a 2015 YouTube video made by QPark, Kim walked around New York City in full costume. The video got ten million views in its first two months. In April 2015, Kim appeared on a South Korean talk show to startle North Korean defectors, who were on the show discussing their previous lives under the totalitarian dictatorship.

== See also ==
- North Korea
- Kim Jong Un
