= Michael Hastings (journalist) =

American journalist and author (1980–2013)

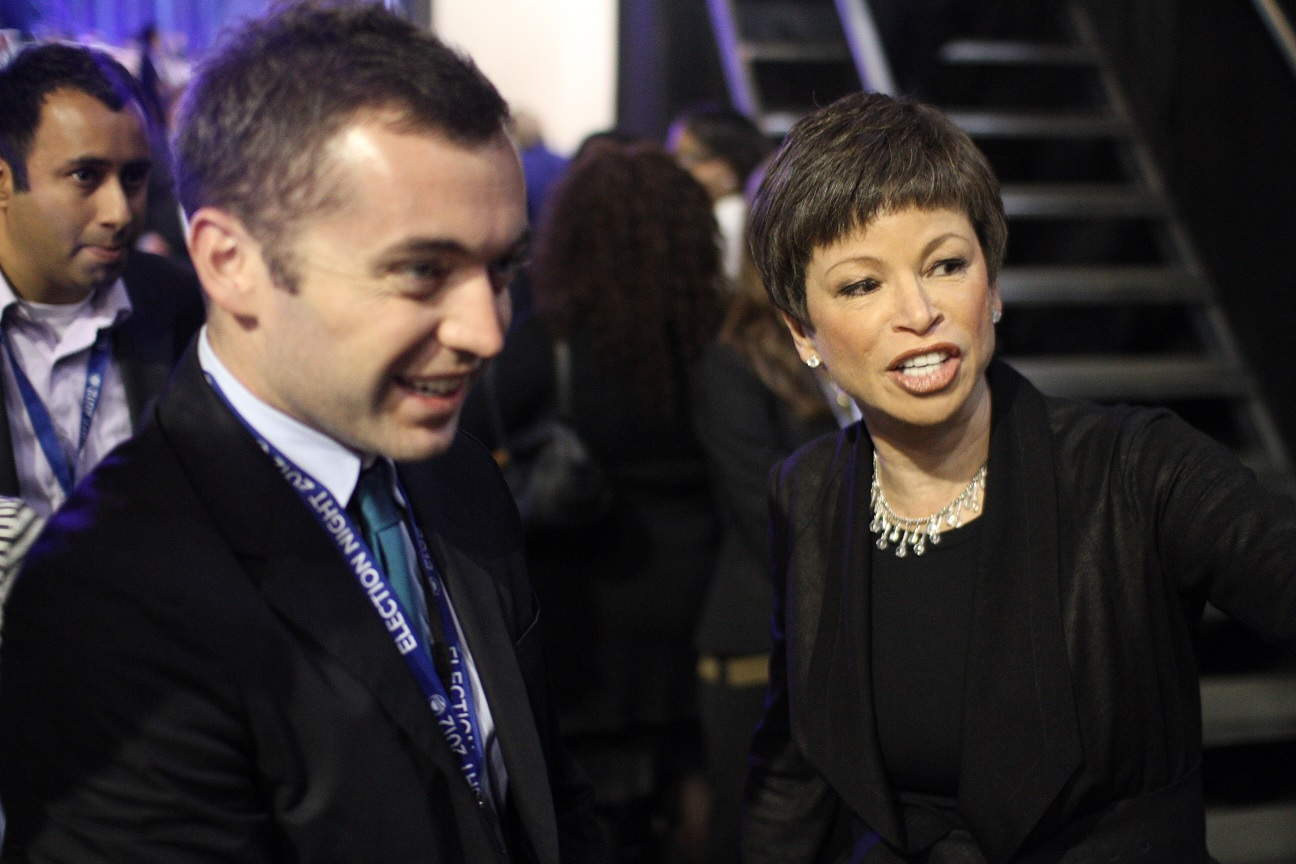
- Hastings and Valerie Jarrett in 2012
- Born: Michael Mahon Hastings; January 28, 1980; Malone, New York, U.S.
- Died: June 18, 2013 (aged 33); Los Angeles, California, U.S.
- Cause of death: Traffic collision
- Education: New York University (B.A)
- Occupation: Journalist
- Known for: War correspondent (Iraq and Afghanistan)
- Notable work: "The Runaway General"
- Spouse: Elise Jordan (m. 2011)
- Awards: George Polk Award; Norman Mailer Prize
- Website: www.michaelhastings.com (no longer exists)

Michael Mahon Hastings (January 28, 1980 – June 18, 2013) was an American journalist, author, contributing editor to Rolling Stone, and reporter for BuzzFeed. He was raised in New York, Canada, and Vermont, and he attended New York University. Hastings rose to prominence with his coverage of the Iraq War for Newsweek in the 2000s. After his fiancée Andrea Parhamovich was killed in an ambush, Hastings wrote his first book, I Lost My Love in Baghdad: A Modern War Story (2008), a memoir about his relationship with Parhamovich and the insurgency that took her life.

He received the George Polk Award for "The Runaway General" (2010), a Rolling Stone profile of General Stanley McChrystal, commander of NATO's International Security Assistance Force in the Afghanistan war. The article documented the widespread contempt for civilian government officials exhibited by the general and his staff and ultimately resulted in McChrystal's resignation. Hastings followed up with The Operators (2012), a detailed account of his monthlong stay with McChrystal in Europe and Afghanistan.

Hastings became a vocal critic of the Obama administration, Democratic Party, and surveillance state during the 2013 Department of Justice investigations of reporters, referring to restrictions of freedom of the press as a "war" on journalism. His last story, "Why Democrats Love to Spy On Americans", was published by BuzzFeed on June 7, 2013.

Hastings died in an automobile crash on June 18, 2013, in Los Angeles, California. The toxicology report showed evidence of THC (level 12 ng/ml) and amphetamine positivity. Blue Rider Press published his only novel, The Last Magazine (2014), a year after his death.

== Early life and family ==
Born in Malone, New York, Michael was the son of Molly (née Mahon) and Brent Hastings. Hastings had two brothers, Jon and Jeff. Hastings lived in Malone until he was 11 years old. His family then moved to Montreal, Quebec, Canada, where his mother was trained in the field of pediatric ophthalmology at McGill University. He attended Lower Canada College, a private preparatory high school in Montreal, where he wrote a column for the school's paper.

When he was 16, his family relocated to Vermont. He attended Rice Memorial High School, a Roman Catholic secondary school in South Burlington, Vermont. In high school Hastings was elected as class president, where he ran on an "anti-administration platform". He played lacrosse and soccer, and performed in the school's plays before graduating in 1998. After graduating, Hastings wrote for Scholastic, an educational magazine for young adults. He attended Connecticut College before earning his Bachelor of Arts in journalism from New York University in 2002.

Hastings married journalist Elise Jordan in May 2011 in Holly Springs, Mississippi.

== Career ==
Hastings began his journalism career as an unpaid intern for Newsweek magazine in 2002, and he was also a regular contributor to Gentlemen's Quarterly and a contributing editor at Rolling Stone magazine.

=== I Lost My Love in Baghdad: A Modern War Story (2008) ===
In 2005, Hastings began covering the Iraq War while living in NATO-occupied Green Zones in Baghdad. Hastings suffered the loss of his fiancée Andrea Parhamovich in 2007. A former spokeswoman for Air America, Parhamovich moved to Baghdad and began working for the National Democratic Institute. She died after her convoy was ambushed by gunmen, killing Parhamovich and her three security guards. Hastings wrote a book on the incident, titled I Lost My Love in Baghdad: A Modern War Story. Shortly before its publication, Newsweek published an excerpt of the book, in which Hastings recounts the day Parhamovich died. The New York Times gave the book a mixed review.

=== Stanley McChrystal interview ===
In June 2010, Rolling Stone published "The Runaway General", Hastings's profile of U.S. Army general Stanley McChrystal, then commander of NATO's International Security Assistance Force in the Afghanistan war. The article reported remarks by McChrystal's staff that were overtly critical and contemptuous of White House staff and other civilian officials. On June 22, news of the forthcoming article reached the attention of the American print media and the White House. McChrystal immediately issued an extensive apology, and Duncan Boothby, the civilian contractor responsible for coordinating the article with Hastings, resigned. U.S. President Barack Obama summoned McChrystal to the White House on June 23, and relieved him of command. Hastings offered his views on relations between McChrystal and the Obama administration.

Hastings was originally meant to have controlled contact, which expanded when he had to catch a bus to Berlin with the general and his entourage after international flights were grounded, because of the air travel disruptions caused by the 2010 eruptions of Eyjafjallajökull, which gave him sufficient time to pick up less discreet remarks. How Hastings got access to McChrystal's inner circles is detailed in a Newsweek article. The Huffington Post named Hastings a 2010 Game Changer for his reporting, along with Matt Taibbi of Rolling Stone. Hastings was awarded a Polk Award for his reporting.

Hastings and Eric Bates, executive editor of Rolling Stone, repeatedly defended the accuracy of Hastings's article about McChrystal. In July 2010, the U.S. Army launched its own investigation into whether McChrystal and his team were insubordinate, and concluded that the most inflammatory comments were made by an officer in the Navy Special Warfare Group, according to The New York Times. This was later confirmed in Hastings's book about the war in Afghanistan that was published in January 2012, The Operators, which attributed a number of damning quotes to Lt. Commander Dave Silverman, now CEO of the McChrystal Group. A subsequent Pentagon investigation challenged the accuracy of Hastings's article "The Runaway General" which anonymously quoted people around McChrystal making disparaging remarks about members of President Obama's national security team, including Vice President Joe Biden. The report from the inquiry states "In some instances, we found no witness who acknowledged making or hearing the comments as reported. In other instances, we confirmed that the general substance of an incident at issue occurred, but not in the exact context described in the article." In response, Rolling Stone stated, "The report by the Pentagon's inspector general offers no credible source – or indeed, any named source – contradicting the facts as reported in our story, 'The Runaway General.'"

In an interview with Matt Lauer of NBC's Today show on June 23, 2011, Hastings said "I did not think Gen. McChrystal would be fired. In fact, I thought his position was basically untouchable, I thought it would give them a headache for maybe 72 hours".

In February 2011, Hastings wrote a lengthy article profiling McChrystal's successor, General David Petraeus, and detailing Petraeus's strategy for the war.

=== The Operators (2012) ===
In January 2012, Hastings published The Operators, a book that details his travels with General Stanley McChrystal and his team in April 2010. It included extensive quotations from over 20 hours of audio recordings of McChrystal and his inner circle. The Daily Beast called it a "book of great consequence... The Operators seems destined to join the pantheon of great GWOT literature". Reviewer Mark Moyar slammed the book in The Wall Street Journal writing, "In contrast to many of the other correspondents covering Afghanistan, Mr. Hastings has not invested the effort required to comprehend the war's complexities." However, the Journal failed to disclose that Mark Moyar was a consultant for the U.S. military, who worked for General Petraeus and General Caldwell. The book became a New York Times bestseller.

Hastings recounted conversations with some of McChrystal's staff members in the book, when during a party at which everyone was "totally shit faced", one asked him, "You're not going to fuck us, are you?" and another stating, "We'll hunt you down and kill you if we don't like what you write". Hastings interpreted the drunken comments as a joke.

=== Other reporting ===
In February 2012, Hastings released an internal document of the United States Department of Homeland Security, which showed that the U.S. government has been keeping tabs on protestors of the Occupy Wall Street movement

Panic 2012: The Sublime and Terrifying Inside Story of Obama's Final Campaign was released as a downloadable e-book on popular formats and recounted Hasting's follies for access along President Barack Obama's incumbent race for re-election. The account notably includes a profile of press secretary Jay Carney, describing Carney as having "a serious, $10,000-a-day habit of following presidents around the country and the world", along with a published feud with White House aide Philippe Reines, a post-election spat with Rahm Emanuel, and other attempts of gaining deeper access. The script was published by Penguin/Blue Rider Press on January 5, 2013.

==== Occupy Wall Street movement ====
In February 2012, in partnership with WikiLeaks, Hastings and Rolling Stone reported that the U.S. Department of Homeland Security (DHS) had been keeping tabs on the Occupy Wall Street movement. An October 2011 report named "Special Coverage: Occupy Wall Street," the DHS wrote that "mass gatherings associated with public protest movements can have disruptive effects on transportation, commercial, and government services, especially when staged in major metropolitan areas." Hastings criticized the DHS report, which concluded, "The continued expansion of these protests also places an increasingly heavy burden on law enforcement and movement organizers to control protesters."

==== Bowe Bergdahl: America's Last Prisoner of War ====
In June 2012, Hastings wrote an article about the struggles of Private First Class Bowe Bergdahl, who was captured by the Taliban when he walked off his Army base in Afghanistan in 2009 after being disillusioned with the war.

In an interview with MSNBC anchor Alex Wagner, Hastings discussed his article and said, "There are elements within the Pentagon who don't want to make the trade for Bowe Bergdahl".

A White House official subsequently responded to these allegations by informing Hastings that "details of Sergeant Bergdahl's capture are irrelevant". Bowe Bergdahl was traded for five Taliban prisoners in June 2014.

==== President Obama's foreign policy ====
Hastings was a longtime critic of the U.S. drone program. In May 2013, Hastings denounced President Barack Obama's foreign policy and use of drones as an embrace of Bush-era neoconservatism and "total militarism." Hastings said that Obama "enshrines killing people and spying on journalists as the two major tenets of his national-security state." During the discussion, Hastings said that MSNBC contributor Perry Bacon Jr., was acting as a "stenographer" for the White House.

== Death ==
On June 18, 2013, Hastings died in a single-vehicle automobile crash in his Mercedes-Benz C250 Coupé at approximately 4:25 a.m. in the Hancock Park neighborhood of Los Angeles. A witness to the crash said the car seemed to be traveling at maximum speed and was creating sparks and flames before it fishtailed and crashed into a palm tree. Video from a nearby security camera reportedly shows Hastings's vehicle speeding and bursting into flames.

Witnesses described the car's engine being ejected 50 to 60 yards (46–55 m) from the scene. Hastings's body was burned beyond recognition. The coroner identified the body by matching fingerprints with those the FBI had on file. Two days after the crash, the Los Angeles Police Department declared that there were no signs of foul play. The coroner's report ruled the death to be an accident. An autopsy showed that the cause of death was massive blunt force trauma consistent with a high-speed crash. The toxicology report showed evidence of THC (level 12 ng/ml) and methamphetamine positivity, but concluded it was "unlikely to have an intoxicative effect at the time of the accident" (page 7, autopsy report).

In an interview with writer Ray Sawhill, Hastings's older brother Jonathan Hastings recounts how he had flown to L.A. to help his brother shortly before the accident because he had "got the impression that [Michael] was having a manic episode, similar to one he had 15 years ago...", at which time "drugs had been involved..." After failing to convince his brother to check voluntarily into a drug rehabilitation program, or fly back to Vermont to stay with family, Jonathan started making plans with his other brother to attempt to "force Mike into checking himself into a hospital or detox center." However, before that could be arranged, "[Michael] snuck out [of the apartment] on me when I was sleeping." Michael had crashed shortly afterward.

When asked directly whether Michael might have died from some sort of foul play, Jonathan responded, "I really rule out foul play entirely. I might have been suspicious if I hadn't been with him the day before he died. After all, he definitely was investigating and writing about a lot of sensitive subjects. But based on being with him and talking to people who were worried about him in the weeks leading up to his death, and being around him when he had had similar problems when he was younger, I was pretty much convinced that he wasn't in danger from any outside agency."

Hastings was eulogized in the media by figures such as Chris Hayes, Rachel Maddow, his co-workers at BuzzFeed, and others.

The 2015 documentary film Imminent Threat, directed by Janek Ambros, is dedicated to his work.

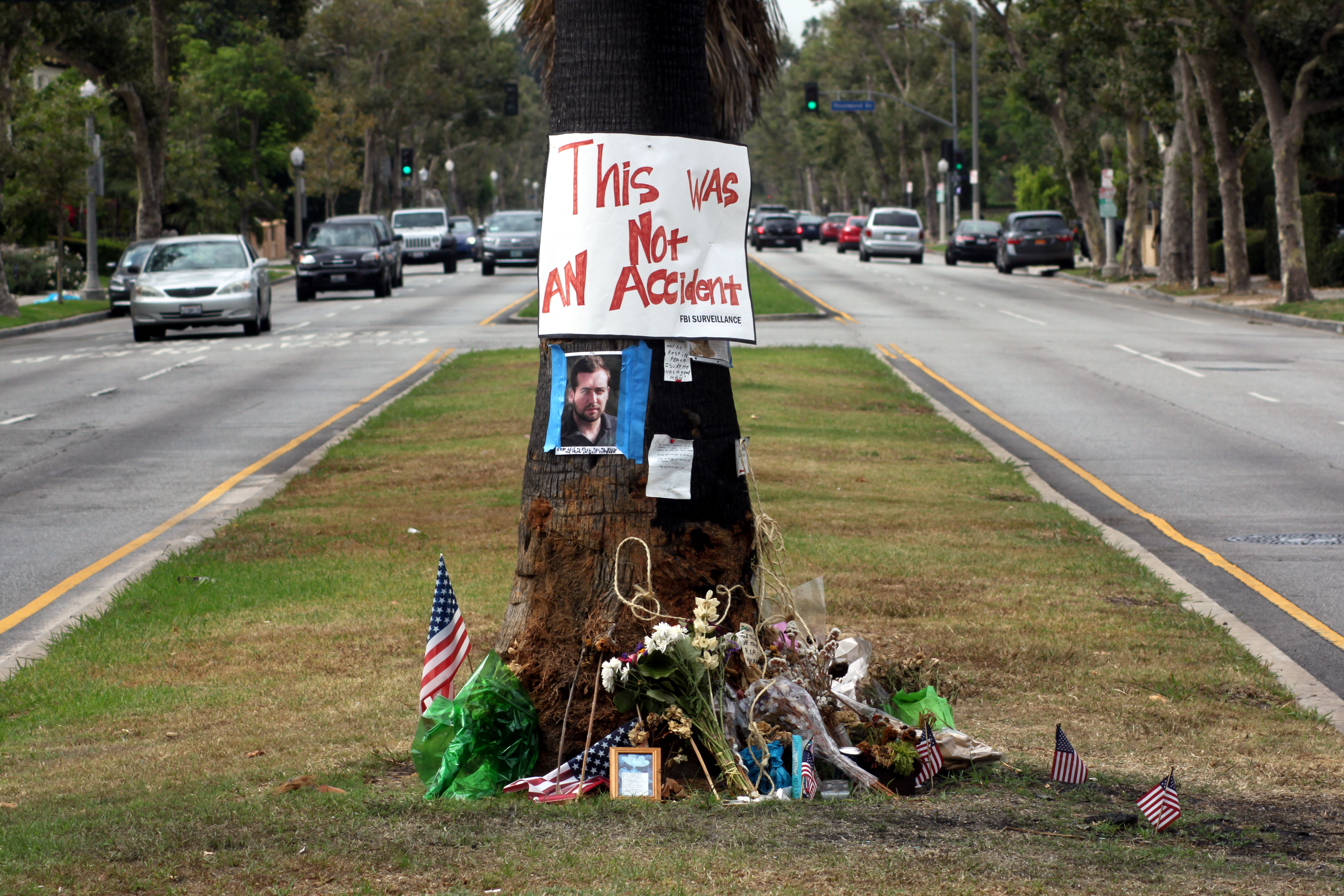
Tree at the Hastings crash site in July 2013. Coordinates: 34.082459°N 118.338603°W

=== Controversy over alleged foul play ===
Soon after Hastings's death, questions were raised about the crash that took his life.

Former U.S. National Coordinator for Security, Infrastructure Protection, and Counter-terrorism Richard A. Clarke said that what is known about the crash is "consistent with a car cyber attack." He was quoted as saying: "There is reason to believe that intelligence agencies for major powers—including the United States—know how to remotely seize control of a car. So if there were a cyber attack on [Hastings'] car — and I'm not saying there was, I think whoever did it would probably get away with it."

The day before the crash, Hastings indicated that he believed he was being investigated by the Federal Bureau of Investigation. In an email to colleagues, Hastings said that he was "onto a big story", that he needed to "go off the radar", and that the FBI might interview said colleagues. WikiLeaks announced that Hastings had also contacted Jennifer Robinson, one of his lawyers, a few hours prior to the crash, and the LA Weekly reported that he was preparing new reports on the CIA at the time of his death.

The FBI released a statement denying that Hastings was ever under investigation by the agency. According to the alternative newspaper LA Weekly, his neighbor Jordanna Thigpen said that Hastings came to her apartment after midnight and urgently asked to borrow her Volvo, saying he was afraid to drive his own car. However, Thigpen declined.

Motor Trend technical director Frank Markus said that the ensuing fire was consistent with a high-speed car crash. There are conflicting opinions as to Hastings's death. After his death, some media outlets recalled that Hastings said he had received death threats from the military after the McChrystal article.

Cenk Uygur, a friend of Hastings's and host of The Young Turks, told KTLA that many of Michael's friends were concerned that he was "in a very agitated state", saying he was "incredibly tense" and worried that his material was being surveilled by the government. Friends believed that Michael's line of work led to a "paranoid state." USA Today reported that in the days before his death, Hastings believed his car was being "tampered with" and that he was scared and wanted to leave town.

The possibility of a conspiracy or some sort of government involvement in Hastings's death has been discounted by members of his own family, who were with him around the time of his death. Hastings's widow, Elise Jordan, has said she believes his death to be "just a really tragic accident." Other members of his family have stated that they were concerned at the time that he was a danger to himself from his erratic behavior. His older brother Jonathan had just flown to L.A., attempting to organize some sort of family intervention for what he believed was a drug-induced "manic episode", a concern apparently echoed by others close to him at that time.

== FBI files ==
FBI file on Michael Hastings

The FBI file on Michael Hastings and its attachments (totaling 21 pages) were released to the public on September 24, 2013, after investigative journalist Jason Leopold and MIT doctoral candidate Ryan Shapiro filed a joint suit in July 2013 against the FBI for ignoring their FOIA requests for the file. The FBI failed to respond to the requests within the allotted 20-day period. On August 15, Leopold released a statement that read, "The Department of Justice (DOJ) has indicated that the FBI has likely located responsive records pertaining to investigative journalist Michael Hastings." Al Jazeera, along with Shapiro, released results from a FOIA request showing that the FBI's Washington field office had opened a file on Hastings in June 2012 to store "unclassified media articles" and "memorialize controversial reporting by Rolling Stone magazine on June 7, 2012." The attorney who filed the FOIA lawsuit, Jeff Light, suggested that it was uncommon for the FBI to open such files on reporters.

== Awards ==
In 2013, Hastings was posthumously awarded the Norman Mailer Prize for Distinguished Journalism.

== Tribute ==
In 2017, The Daily Beast announced it had posted one of Hastings's quotes on the walls of their office: "There are three great beats in American journalism: politics, Hollywood, and war." During an MSNBC broadcast, Rachel Maddow paid tribute to Hastings after his death, saying: "Michael was angry; he was also loving and thoughtful and constructive and brilliant, but he was angry about things that weren't right in the world . . . with war and with loss, and that drove his reporting, and it made him fearless when he realized he had found something important that he could report."

== Selected publications ==
- Hastings, Michael (2008). I Lost My Love in Baghdad: A Modern War Story. New York: Scribner. ISBN 9781416560975.
- Hastings, Michael (2012). The Operators: The Wild and Terrifying Inside Story of America's War in Afghanistan. New York: Blue Rider Press.
- Hastings, Michael (October 2008). "Hack: Confessions of a Presidential Campaign Reporter". Gentlemen's Quarterly.
- Hastings, Michael. "Obama's War". Gentlemen's Quarterly.
- Hastings, Michael (June 22, 2010). "The Runaway General". Rolling Stone. Archived from the original on June 24, 2010.
- Hastings, Michael (February 2, 2011). "King David's War". Rolling Stone.
- Hastings, Michael (February 23, 2011). "Another Runaway General: Army Deploys Psy-Ops on U.S. Senators". Rolling Stone. Archived from the original on February 25, 2011.
- Hastings, Michael (October 2011). "Inside Obama's War Room". Rolling Stone.
- Hastings, Michael. "The Rise of the Killer Drones". Rolling Stone.
- Hastings, Michael. "America's Last Prisoner of War". Rolling Stone.
- Articles in, inter alia, Foreign Policy, Los Angeles Times, Newsweek International, Salon, and Slate.
- Hastings, Michael (January 15, 2013). Panic 2012: The Sublime and Terrifying Inside Story of Obama's Final Campaign. BuzzFeed/Blue Rider Press.
