= War Machine (2017 film) =

2017 film by David Michôd

- Film poster
- Directed by: David Michôd
- Written by: David Michôd
- Based on: The Operators by Michael Hastings
- Produced by: Brad Pitt; Dede Gardner; Jeremy Kleiner; Ted Sarandos; Ian Bryce
- Starring: Brad Pitt; Anthony Michael Hall; Anthony Hayes; Topher Grace; Will Poulter; Tilda Swinton; Ben Kingsley
- Cinematography: Dariusz Wolski
- Edited by: Peter Sciberras
- Music by: Nick Cave; Warren Ellis
- Production companies: Plan B Entertainment; Blue-Tongue Films
- Distributed by: Netflix
- Release dates: May 24, 2017 (High Street Phoenix); May 26, 2017 (United States)
- Running time: 122 minutes
- Country: United States
- Language: English
- Budget: $60 million

War Machine is a 2017 American satirical war comedy film written and directed by David Michôd and starring Brad Pitt, Anthony Michael Hall, Anthony Hayes, Topher Grace, Will Poulter, Tilda Swinton, and Ben Kingsley. Based on the nonfiction book The Operators: The Wild and Terrifying Inside Story of America's War in Afghanistan by Michael Hastings, it is a fictionalized version of the events in the book based on United States Army General Stanley McChrystal.

The film was released on Netflix on May 26, 2017 and received mixed reviews from critics.

== Plot ==
In the summer of 2009, four-star General Glen McMahon, having won renown for his effective leadership in Iraq, is sent to Afghanistan to prepare a strategic assessment so the government can end the ongoing war. He is given wide latitude to write it, on the sole condition that he not request more troops.

McMahon and his staff, including right-hand man Major General Greg Pulver, unanimously believe the war can be won, and recommend that President Obama authorize a surge of 40,000 troops to secure Helmand province to stabilize the country. The Secretary of State informs McMahon that such a surge is unfeasible politically and the report won't be reviewed until after Afghanistan's presidential election.

Captain Badi Basim of the Afghan National Army joins McMahon's staff as a liaison. He arrives in civilian clothes as his uniform increases the risk he'll be killed. McMahon learns that massive voter fraud in the recent election has forced a runoff election, further delaying the review of his assessment. Fed up, McMahon secretly leaks the report to The Washington Post and reveals in an interview with 60 Minutes that he's only met once with President Obama in the preceding 70 days.

Obama responds by sending 30,000 additional troops to Afghanistan, with a pledge that U.S. and coalition forces will fully withdraw in 18 months. McMahon and his staff are furious that US Afghan strategy has been telegraphed to their Taliban enemies. To make up the shortfall of 10,000 troops needed for McMahon's plan, he takes his staff to Paris to negotiate with other coalition nations, where he learns the President is in Denmark and wishes to meet. The ambassador to Afghanistan cautions McMahon that if he continues to anger the President, he'll be fired for insubordination, and the President ends up brushing off their meeting. When McMahon attends a dinner in his honor, Rolling Stone writer Sean Cullen reveals his intention to write a feature story about McMahon. On their wedding anniversary McMahon's wife Jeanie confronts him about neglecting his family through his long absences overseas.

En route to Berlin with McMahon's staff to continue negotiations, Cullen concludes they are arrogant, care little about growing public perception that the war is costly and unwinnable, and hold their civilian leadership in contempt. McMahon is confronted by a German official who criticizes the war and McMahon's strategy but the Germans and the French agree to furnish troops for McMahon's planned offensive, codenamed "Operation Moshtarak", which Afghan President Hamid Karzai has approved. Several civilians are accidentally killed when the operation launches. McMahon holds a public meeting to apologize to local citizens and explain the U.S. is fighting for their benefit. The crowd remains hostile and McMahon is asked to leave. McMahon discovers Cullen's article, now published, paints a negative picture of him and his staff defying the President and mishandling the war effort. When Obama calls McMahon to Washington, McMahon takes a job as a civilian consultant in anticipation of his firing. Cullen ponders the consequences of his article, having hoped McMahon's fall would convince the government to stop invading foreign countries and end the war in Afghanistan.

A new general is appointed by the government to replace McMahon and continue the war.

== Cast ==
McMahon's Entourage

- Brad Pitt as General Glen McMahon, a character based on General Stanley McChrystal. He is portrayed as an accomplished general with degrees from West Point and Yale University, brought in to bring a resolution to the conflict in Afghanistan.
- Anthony Hayes as Lieutenant Commander Pete Duckman, a Navy SEAL and member of McMahon's staff
- Emory Cohen as Sergeant Willy Dunne, General McMahon's body man
- RJ Cyler as USAF Tech Sergeant Andy Moon, information technology support assistant
- Daniel Betts as USN Rear Admiral Simon Ball, McMahon's Senior Public Affairs Officer
- Topher Grace as Matt Little, a former lobbyist turned McMahon's civilian media adviser, based loosely on Duncan Boothby
- Anthony Michael Hall as Major General Greg Pulver, ISAF Director of Intelligence, loosely based on Lieutenant General Michael Flynn
- John Magaro as Colonel Cory Staggart, an Army Ranger and General McMahon's executive officer
- Aymen Hamdouchi as Captain Badi Basim, a scholarly Afghan National Army officer who becomes General McMahon's aide-de-camp
- Scoot McNairy as Sean Cullen, a cynical journalist for Rolling Stone who accompanies McMahon and his staff and acts as narrator throughout the film, loosely based on author Michael Hastings
- Meg Tilly as Jeanie McMahon, Glen McMahon's wife

U.S. Diplomats

- Sian Thomas as United States Secretary of State Edith May, based on Hillary Rodham Clinton
- Alan Ruck as Lieutenant General Pat McKinnon, United States Ambassador to Afghanistan, loosely based on Lieutenant General Karl Eikenberry
- Nicholas Jones as Dick Waddle, loosely based on Special Representative for Afghanistan and Pakistan Richard Holbrooke
- Griffin Dunne as Ray Canucci, a United States Department of State senior official

Politicians

- Ben Kingsley as President Hamid Karzai
- Reggie Brown as President Barack Obama
- Tilda Swinton as a German politician

Combat Marines

- Will Poulter as Sergeant Ricky Ortega, a Marine Corps infantry squad leader
- LaKeith Stanfield as Corporal Billy Cole, a disillusioned Marine and member of Ortega's squad.
- Josh Stewart as Captain Dick North, a Marine Corps officer

Other cast members

- Rufus Wright as British Army Lieutenant Colonel Frank Groom
- Georgina Rylance as Lydia Cunningham, 60 Minutes journalist
- Andrew Byron warrant officer of AFU Vladyslav Melnyk
- Russell Crowe as General Bob White (uncredited), General Glen McMahon's replacement, similar to David Petraeus

== Production ==
=== Development ===
On April 27, 2012, it was announced that New Regency and Plan B Entertainment had acquired the film adaptation rights to the 2011 best seller non-fiction book The Operators by Michael Hastings. On April 14, 2014, David Michôd was hired to write and direct the film based on the war in Afghanistan. Brad Pitt was attached to star as General Stanley McChrystal and produce the film along with his Plan B partners Dede Gardner and Jeremy Kleiner, while the film would be financed by New Regency and RatPac Entertainment.

On June 8, 2015, Netflix acquired the distribution rights to the film which was re-titled War Machine, while Ian Bryce also came on board to produce the film along with others. On June 17, The Hollywood Reporter revealed that there had been a budget issue between New Regency and RatPac with producers of Plan B, and thus Netflix had stepped in to buy the distribution rights for $60 million.

On August 4, 2015, Emory Cohen was cast in the film to play a member of Gen. McChrystal's staff. On August 10, 2015, Topher Grace joined the film to play Gen. Stanley McChrystal's civilian press adviser. On August 11, 2015, John Magaro signed on to play Cory Burger, a special ops soldier and close advisor to General McMahon. On August 14, 2015, Scoot McNairy joined the cast of the film. On August 19, 2015, Anthony Michael Hall was added to the cast to play General Hank Pulver, loosely based on General Mike Flynn. On August 20, 2015, LaKeith Stanfield signed on to the film. The same day, Will Poulter also joined the cast for an unspecified role. On August 25, Anthony Hayes joined the film. On October 23, 2015, TheWrap revealed that RJ Cyler had also joined the film.

=== Filming ===
Principal photography on the film began in mid-October 2015 in London. Later on October 19, filming began in Abu Dhabi; the city was transformed into Kabul, streets into a military fortress, an old building as an American Embassy in Kabul, and a street as a Palestinian border crossing. Filming also took place at the Abu Dhabi International Airport in November. In mid-November 2015, while final scenes were being shot, actors were spotted filming in Ras al-Khaimah and the city's old neighborhood was transformed into Pakistani villages and a military base-camp. The film's final scene filmed in Sydney Airport's International Terminal arrival hall, is a cameo appearance by Russel Crowe, a Sydney resident, along with other Australian Dan Wyllie. The scene displays pitch black windows as it was filmed during the airports 11pm to 6am shutdown and curfew.

== Release ==
The film was released on Netflix on May 26, 2017.

=== Marketing ===
Brad Pitt visited Mumbai to promote the film and attended a special screening at PVR High Street Phoenix on May 24, 2017. He also met Bollywood star Shah Rukh Khan to promote War Machine.

== Reception ==
On the review aggregator website Rotten Tomatoes, the film has an approval rating of 48% based on 95 reviews, and an average rating of 5.7/10. The website's critical consensus reads, "War Machine's uneven execution keeps its fact-based story from cleanly hitting its targets, but those flaws are frequently offset by sharp wit and solid acting." On Metacritic, the film has a weighted average score of 56 out of 100 score, based on 30 critics, indicating "mixed or average" reviews.

Richard Roeper of the Chicago Sun-Times gave it 3.5 out of 4 star rating, and wrote: "I wouldn't be surprised if some observers say Pitt made huge miscalculations in his acting choices with the result being the worst performance of his career - but I found it to be a brazenly effective piece of work, well-suited to the material." Jonathan Pile of Empire gave it 2 out of 5 and called it "A confused comedy that wastes the promise of its premise. And Brad Pitt's performance, sadly, belongs in a different film entirely."
