= Republican Leadership Conference =

Political Event in Southern US

The Southern Republican Leadership Conference (SRLC) is a political event held in the Southern United States before each presidential election. The event is attended by Republican Party activists, elected officials, and candidates for office. It has featured every major Republican presidential candidate since Ronald Reagan, and is best known for its presidential straw poll, which receives national media attention. In 2011, the event was dubbed the Republican Leadership Conference before restoring its original name for 2012.

== 2015 conference ==
=== Straw poll ===
Finish	Candidate	%
1	Ben Carson	25
2	Scott Walker	21
3	Ted Cruz	17

== 2014 conference ==
The 2014 Republican Leadership Conference was held in New Orleans, and featured various speakers such as RNC Chairman Reince Priebus, Louisiana Governor Bobby Jindal, former Alaska Governor Sarah Palin, Phil Robertson of Duck Dynasty fame, Family Research Council head Tony Perkins, former Mississippi Governor Haley Barbour, businessman and later President Donald Trump, Louisiana Senator David Vitter, Colonel and former Congressman Allen West, former US Speaker of the House Newt Gingrich, Utah Senator Mike Lee, Texas senator Ted Cruz, businessman and former presidential candidate Herman Cain, former Pennsylvania senator and former presidential candidate Rick Santorum, Louisiana Congressman Bill Cassidy, Congresswoman and former presidential candidate Michele Bachmann, and Texas governor and former presidential candidate Rick Perry.

=== Straw poll ===
Texas senator Ted Cruz narrowly won the 2014 straw poll, barely defeating Dr. Ben Carson. Senator Rand Paul came in a distant third, while former Arkansas governor Mike Huckabee and Texas governor Rick Perry rounded out the top 5.

Finish	Candidate	%
1	Ted Cruz	30
2	Ben Carson	29
3	Rand Paul	10
4	Mike Huckabee	5
5	Rick Perry	5

== 2011 conference ==
The 2011 event featured various speakers, including Governors, Senators, state legislators, and authors. It was attended by several candidates, and potential candidates, for President of the United States, including Congresswoman Michele Bachmann, businessman Herman Cain, former Speaker of the House Newt Gingrich, former Governor Gary Johnson, Congressman Ron Paul, Governor Rick Perry, former Governor Buddy Roemer and former Senator Rick Santorum. Other speakers at the conference included Governors Bobby Jindal and Haley Barbour, and Barack Obama impersonator Reggie Brown.

=== Straw poll ===
Congressman Ron Paul won the straw poll by a large margin, with Governor Jon Huntsman, Jr., who was scheduled to speak at the event but cancelled, placing second. Congresswoman Michele Bachmann and businessman Herman Cain placed in a close third and fourth.

Finish	Candidate	%
1	Ron Paul	41
2	Jon Huntsman	25
3	Michele Bachmann	13
4	Herman Cain	7
5	Mitt Romney	5
6	Newt Gingrich	5
7	Rick Santorum	2
8	Tim Pawlenty	1
9	Gary Johnson	1
10	Buddy Roemer	1
11	Thad McCotter	<1

== 2010 conference ==
The 2010 convention was attended by U.S. Representative and 2008 presidential candidate Ron Paul of Texas; Republican National Committee Chair Michael Steele; and former Alaska Governor and 2008 vice presidential candidate Sarah Palin.

=== Straw poll ===
Mitt Romney won the presidential straw poll by a single vote. Both Romney and Ron Paul received 24 per cent of the vote. Potential 2012 presidential candidates Senator John Thune of South Dakota, Governor Haley Barbour of Mississippi, Governor Bobby Jindal of Louisiana and Governor Rick Perry of Texas asked for their names not to be included on the straw poll ballot.

If the primary election for president were held today, for whom would you vote?
Candidate	Votes	%
Mitt Romney	439	24
Ron Paul	438	24
Sarah Palin	330	18
Newt Gingrich	321	18
Mike Huckabee	80	4
Mike Pence	58	3
Tim Pawlenty	54	3
Rick Santorum	41	2
Gary Johnson	3	1

Who would be your second choice in the Republican Primary Election for president?
Candidate	Votes	%
Newt Gingrich	339	20
Sarah Palin	332	20
Mitt Romney	242	14
Mike Huckabee	178	11
Mike Pence	141	8
Rick Santorum	125	7
Tim Pawlenty	114	7
Gary Johnson	104	6
Ron Paul	98	6

== 2006 conference ==
=== Straw poll ===
Then-Senate Majority Leader Bill Frist won the 2006 straw poll.

2006 straw poll first choice results
Candidate	Votes	%
Bill Frist	526	37
Mitt Romney	205	14
George Allen	147	10
George W. Bush	147	10
John McCain	66	5
Mike Huckabee	54	4
Write-in candidates other than Bush and Rice	43	3
George Pataki	38	3
Condoleezza Rice	32	2
Sam Brownback	22	2
Rudy Giuliani	15	1
Newt Gingrich	13	1
Chuck Hagel	3	<1
