= Andrea Parhamovich =

American activist (1978–2007)

- Born: June 16, 1978; Perry, Ohio, U.S.
- Died: January 17, 2007 (aged 28); Baghdad, Iraq

Andrea Suzanne Parhamovich (June 16, 1978 – January 17, 2007) was an American National Democratic Institute employee killed in Baghdad, Iraq, when her convoy was ambushed as she was returning from teaching a class on democracy.

== Career ==
Parhamovich was born in Perry, Ohio, and graduated from Marietta College. She pursued a career in political communication with the office of the governor of Massachusetts and the International Republican Institute in Iraq before joining the staff of NDI in 2006.

After her death in Baghdad, she was the subject of the book I Lost My Love in Baghdad: A Modern War Story, written by her fiancé, Newsweek reporter Michael Hastings.

== Commemoration ==
The Vermont General Assembly passed a resolution commemorating Parhamovich's actions in Iraq. Magdy Martinez, executive head of the United Nations Democracy Fund, honored Parhamovich's legacy in a message of condolence.

The Andi Foundation was established in her honor to fund college scholarships and access to internship opportunities in politics and media. The Foundation operates the Andi Leadership Institute, which provides annual leadership training for women in conflict zones.
