= The Operators (book) =

Book by Michael Hastings

- Author: Michael Hastings
- Subject: War in Afghanistan (2001–2021)
- Genre: Military History
- Publisher: Blue Rider Press
- Publication date: 2012
- Pages: 417 pages
- ISBN: 0399159886
- OCLC: 769821482
- Website: michaelhastings.com

The Operators: The Wild and Terrifying Inside Story of America's War in Afghanistan is a 2012 non-fiction book by American journalist Michael Hastings. The book was adapted into the fictionalized film War Machine (2017).

== Plot ==
The Operators is a book that details the author's travels with General Stanley McChrystal and his team in April 2010. It includes extensive quotations from over 20 hours of audio recordings of McChrystal and his inner circle.

== Critical reception ==
The Daily Beast called it a "book of great consequence...The Operators seems destined to join the pantheon of Global War on Terror (GWOT) literature". Kirkus Reviews states that the book is "An exciting and enlightening exposé of the war in Afghanistan, the dangers of concentrated power and the public’s need to know." Conversely, in The Wall Street Journal, reviewer Mark Moyar slammed the book, stating: "In contrast to many of the other correspondents covering Afghanistan, Mr. Hastings has not invested the effort required to comprehend the war's complexities." The book became a New York Times bestseller.

== Film adaptation ==
On 14 April 2014, it was announced that David Michôd would write and direct The Operators, which was subsequently retitled War Machine. The 2017 film was jointly produced by Plan B Entertainment, New Regency, Netflix, and RatPac Entertainment, and starred Brad Pitt.
