= Second Amendments =

Rock band consisting of conservative US congressmen

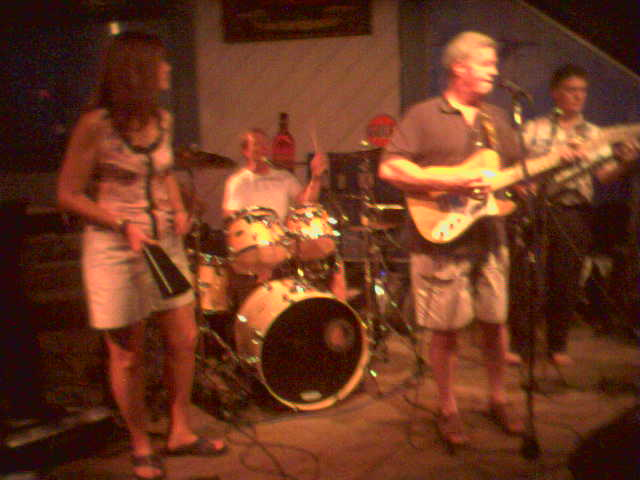
The Second Amendments performing in 2006

The Second Amendments was a bipartisan conservative rock/country/country rock band, all of the members of which were also members of the United States House of Representatives. It featured Representatives Collin Peterson (DFL-Minnesota) on guitar and lead vocals, Thaddeus McCotter (R-Michigan) on lead guitar, Dave Weldon (R-Florida) on bass, Jon Porter (R-Nevada) on keyboards, and Kenny Hulshof (R-Missouri) on drums. The band broke up after the 2008 elections when two of its members, Hulshof and Weldon, retired, and Porter lost his reelection bid.

The name is a reference to the Second Amendment to the United States Constitution as well as a previous band of Peterson's named the Amendments. The previous band broke up after their gigs became partisan with some members wanting to play at the Republican National Convention.

== See also ==
- The Singing Senators, a barbershop quartet
