= Thaddeus McCotter =

American politician (born 1965)

Thad McCotter
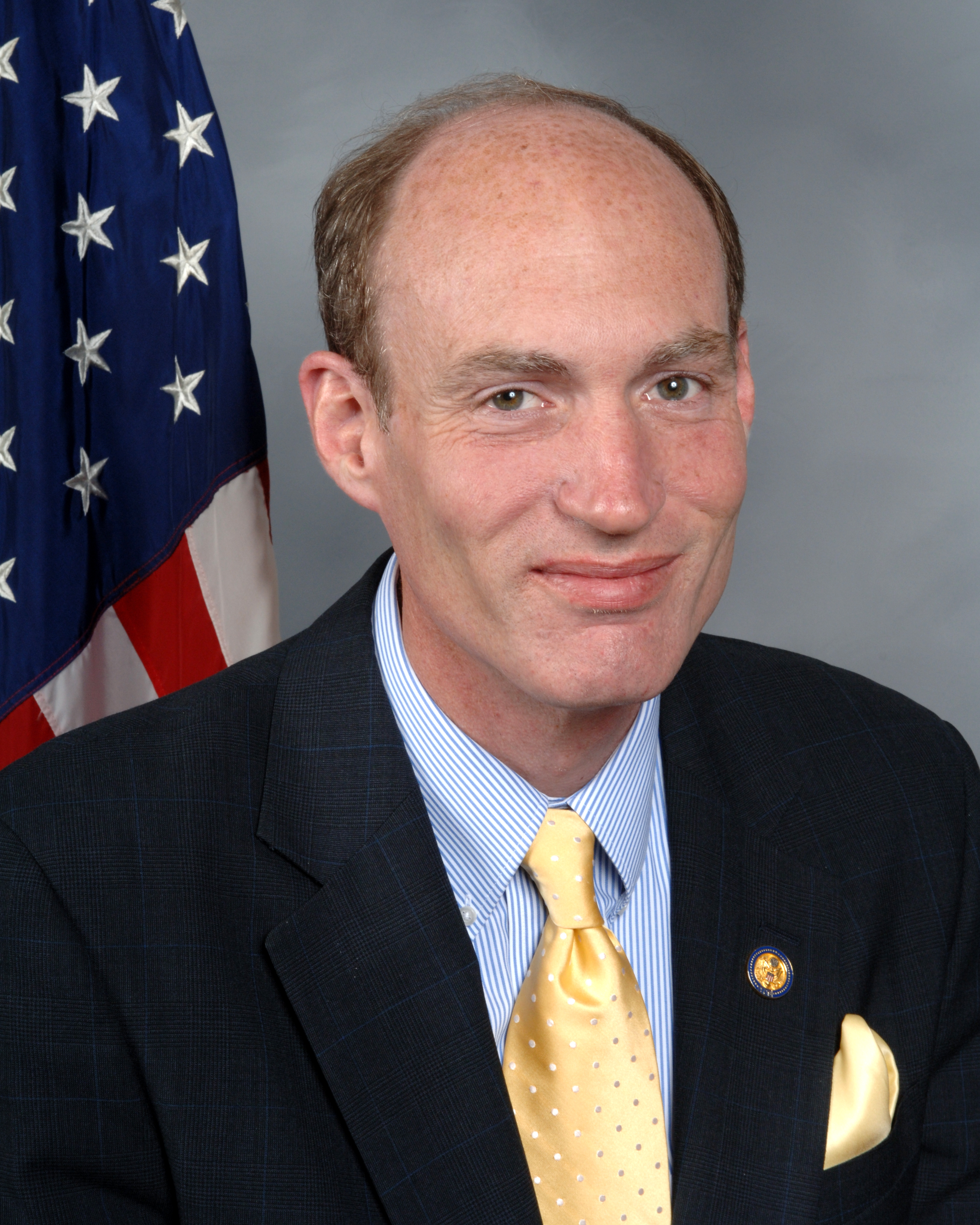
- Official portrait, 2011

Chair of the House Republican Policy Committee
- In office January 3, 2007 – January 3, 2011
- Leader: John Boehner
- Preceded by: Adam Putnam
- Succeeded by: Tom Price

Member of the U.S. House of Representatives from Michigan's 11th district
- In office January 3, 2003 – July 6, 2012
- Preceded by: Constituency established
- Succeeded by: David Curson

Member of the Michigan Senate from the 9th district
- In office January 13, 1999 – January 8, 2003
- Preceded by: Robert Geake
- Succeeded by: Dennis Olshove

Personal details
- Born: Thaddeus George McCotter; August 22, 1965 (age 60) Livonia, Michigan, U.S.
- Party: Republican
- Education: University of Detroit (BA, JD)

Thaddeus George McCotter (born August 22, 1965) is an American politician, radio host, and a member of the Republican Party. He was the U.S. representative from Michigan's 11th congressional district from 2003 to 2012. The district at the time consisted of portions of Detroit's northwestern suburbs, such as Livonia, Westland and Novi. He was also a candidate for the Republican nomination for president in the 2012 election.

McCotter first entered politics in 1992 when he was elected to the Wayne County Commission. He then served in the Michigan Senate from 1999 to 2003. In 2002, McCotter was elected to the U.S. House of Representatives. From July to September 2011, McCotter was a candidate for the Republican presidential nomination for the 2012 race. After a last place finish in the Iowa Straw Poll in August and failing to secure a spot in the presidential debates, McCotter suspended his campaign.

After ending his presidential campaign, McCotter decided to run again for his seat in Congress, but he failed to qualify for the 2012 Republican primary in his congressional district after most of his petition signatures were rejected as invalid. McCotter himself was not suspected of wrongdoing, though several of his staffers were charged with duplicating signatures and other electoral crimes, and some convicted. McCotter later sued some of the perpetrators for damage to his reputation, but fallout from the ensuing scandal resulted in McCotter's resignation from Congress in July 2012.

== Early life, education, and career ==
McCotter was born in Detroit, Michigan, and is a 1983 graduate of Detroit Catholic Central High School in Redford. His mother, Georgia Joan McCotter, was the city clerk of Livonia. He received a B.A. from the University of Detroit in 1987 and a J.D. from the same school in 1990.

McCotter had a private law practice and was a Schoolcraft College trustee before being elected to the Wayne County Commission in 1992. While on the commission, he worked to change the county charter to require that new taxes require the approval of two-thirds of the Commission and 60% of voters.

McCotter was elected to the Michigan State Senate in 1998. As a state senator, he helped apportion the U.S. Congressional district from which he was subsequently elected in 2002.

== U.S. House of Representatives ==
=== Committee assignments ===
- Committee on Financial Services
  - Subcommittee on Capital Markets, Insurance, and Government-Sponsored Enterprises
  - Subcommittee on Financial Institutions and Consumer Credit
  - Subcommittee on International Monetary Policy and Trade

==== Party leadership and caucus memberships ====
- Congressional COPD Caucus
- House Sovereignty Caucus (co-founder)
- International Conservation Caucus
- Sportsmen's Caucus

Shortly before the midterm elections in November 2006, McCotter made a $250,000 contribution to the National Republican Congressional Committee. After the elections, when the Republicans became the minority party in the House of Representatives, McCotter was elected chairman of the House Republican Policy Committee, the fifth-ranking post among House Republicans. The other Republican seeking the post was Congressman Darrell Issa of southern California.

== Political positions ==
McCotter was a member of both the moderate Republican Main Street Partnership and the conservative Republican Study Committee.

In May 2007, McCotter, along with 55 other Republicans, voted for a bill written by House Democrats aimed at stopping energy price gouging, against the wishes of House Minority Leader John Boehner, who labeled the bill "as pointless political pandering".

McCotter was a supporter of the United States' involvement in both the War in Afghanistan and the Iraq War. In his 2011 book Seize Freedom!, he wrote that the wars "were never separate wars; they have always been battle theaters in the War for Freedom."

On September 22, 2008, McCotter became the first Republican in the House of Representatives to oppose the $700 billion Paulson bailout plan, calling it "American socialism". A week later, he and 132 other Republicans voted against the bill.

At the end of July 2009, McCotter introduced a bill to allow pet owners a $3,500 tax deduction for pet care costs. The bill, called the Humanity and Pets Partnered Through the Years (HAPPY) Act, was criticized by Howard Gleckman of the Tax Policy Center as "the poster puppy for all that is wrong with the tax code."

McCotter supported union-friendly measures including collective bargaining agreements for government jobs and card check, although he later said his vote for the so-called card check method was a mistake.

== Political campaigns ==
McCotter was elected in November 2002, defeating Democratic Candidate Kevin Kelley of Redford, to the 108th Congress. He was reelected in the 2004 Congressional elections. McCotter ran unopposed in the 2006 Republican primary. His opponent in the November 2006 general election was Democrat Tony Trupiano, a progressive radio talk show host from Dearborn Heights. McCotter, Trupiano, Libertarian Party nominee John Tatar, and U.S. Taxpayers Party nominee Charles Tackett met only once for a recorded League of Women Voters public forum in mid-October. In radio and direct-mail advertisements, McCotter criticized Trupiano's position on illegal immigration, and he was reelected with 55 percent of the vote.

In November 2008, McCotter defeated Democrat Joseph Larkin, Green Party candidate Erik Shelley, and Libertarian John Tatar. McCotter won 51 percent of the vote to Larkin's 45 percent. In November 2010, McCotter defeated Democrat Natalie Mosher with 59 percent of the vote to Mosher's 39 percent.

=== 2012 presidential campaign ===
In May 2011, McCotter confirmed that he was considering a run for the Republican Party nomination for President of the United States in 2012. By late June, sources indicated that McCotter would enter the race. On June 23, 2011, a McCotter representative bid $18,000 for a site at the Ames Straw Poll Auction in Iowa. On July 1, 2011, McCotter announced that he had filed with the Federal Election Commission (FEC) as a candidate for president. On July 2, 2011, McCotter announced his candidacy at WAAM Freedom Fest in Whitmore Lake, Michigan, outside of Detroit.

Throughout his campaign, commentators suggested that McCotter's lack of name recognition nationwide would hamper his chances of winning the nomination. In opinion polls that included McCotter, he received less than one percent and he came in last place in the August 2011 Ames Straw Poll. On September 22, 2011, McCotter announced the end of his campaign for the presidential nomination, and said that his exclusion from presidential debates had hindered it. Given the lack of media coverage of his campaign, McCotter called the end of his presidential campaign "death by media." He said he would endorse Mitt Romney and would run again for his 11th congressional district in 2012.

=== 2012 congressional campaign and petition scandal ===
In April 2011, McCotter was the only member of Michigan's 15-member congressional delegation who did not confirm he was running for reelection. He indicated interest in running against incumbent Democrat Debbie Stabenow for the U.S. Senate seat in Michigan in 2012, but in May 2011 announced that he would not campaign for the position.

After announcing his intention to run for reelection, McCotter was expected to win the Republican nomination easily, but on May 25, 2012, Michigan Secretary of State Ruth Johnson announced that he had failed to submit enough valid petition signatures to qualify for the August 7 primary ballot. Although McCotter had submitted 2,000 signatures, the maximum permitted by Michigan law for congressional primaries, a preliminary review indicated that fewer than the required minimum of 1,000 were valid. According to a spokeswoman for the Secretary of State's office, several of McCotter's petition signatures were duplicates. Michigan election law stipulates that if duplicates are found, both the original and duplicate are ruled invalid. McCotter had the option of running as a write-in candidate in the primary election or as an independent in the general election if he failed to qualify for a primary ballot spot.

At the time the apparent fraud was uncovered, McCotter was on a congressional trip to Taiwan. On May 26, a source within McCotter's campaign told the Detroit Free Press that McCotter conceded that the signatures would be ruled invalid, and that he was considering a write-in effort. McCotter confirmed this to Nolan Finley of The Detroit News, adding that he did not understand what happened with the signatures on the petitions.

Later that day, state officials announced in two separate reviews that more than 85 percent of McCotter's petition signatures were invalid. The Secretary of State's office said its review revealed only 244 of 2,000 signatures were valid. Numerous petition sheets appeared to have been copied—in some cases, as many as three times—and in some cases a different canvasser's name was attached to one of the copies. Michigan elections director Chris Thomas conducted his own review, and said there was evidence signatures from 2010 petitions had been cut-and-pasted onto the 2012 sheets. Thomas also said that McCotter had only turned in 1,830 signatures, and all but 244 were invalid. His office's review revealed that dozens of petition sheets appeared to have been copied in what he described as an "unprecedented level" of fraud.

Late on May 27, the Secretary of State's office announced that it found the potential fraud egregious enough to ask state attorney general Bill Schuette to look into the matter. In an op-ed that ran in the May 29, 2012, Detroit News, McCotter announced he would mount a write-in campaign in the Republican primary for his seat. He also acknowledged that the signatures in question were indeed invalid, based on his own legal team's review. Likening himself to George Bailey in It's a Wonderful Life, McCotter said that he was running a write-in campaign to "clean up my own mess."

On June 2, McCotter announced that he was ending his bid for reelection and would leave the House at the end of his term. In his statement, he said that he felt obligated to fulfill his duties in Congress and assist Schuette and Johnson in getting to the bottom of the petition fraud. These obligations, he said, made mounting a write-in bid for Congress impossible. "One can't clean up a mess multitasking," he said. McCotter was the first sitting congressman since the late 1940s not to qualify for his party's primary.

A month later, on July 5, The Detroit News reported that McCotter had spent much of the time since his presidential campaign failed writing a television pilot script for a comedy/variety show starring himself, to be called Bumper Sticker: Made on MoTown. It featured characters with the same nicknames he used for members of his staff and a guest appearance by conservative commentator S. E. Cupp. "They take pot shots about McCotter's ill-fated bid for the White House while spewing banter about drinking, sex, race, flatulence, puking and women's anatomy", the newspaper wrote.

=== Resignation and aftermath ===
On July 6, 2012, McCotter resigned from the House. He said:

[T]his past nightmarish month and a half have, for the first time, severed the necessary harmony between the needs of my constituency and of my family. As this harmony is required to serve, its absence requires I leave. The recent event's totality of calumnies, indignities and deceits have weighed most heavily upon my family. Thus, acutely aware one cannot rebuild their hearth of home amongst the ruins of their U.S. House office, for the sake of my loved ones I must "strike another match, go start anew" by embracing the promotion back from public servant to sovereign citizen.

He also wrote:

I do not leave for an existing job and face diminishing prospects (and am both unwilling and ill-suited to lobby), my priorities are twofold: find gainful employment to help provide for my family; and continue to assist, in any way they see fit, the Michigan Attorney General's earnest and thorough investigation, which I requested, into the 2012 petition filing.

While McCotter was not suspected of any wrongdoing, several of his staff members were charged with crimes. District Director Paul Seewald pleaded guilty to falsely signing a petition and was given two years of probation. Deputy District Director Don Yowchuang pleaded no contest to ten counts of felony forgery and was given three years of probation. Scheduler Lorraine O'Brady pleaded no contest to five counts of falsely signing a nominating petition and was sentenced to 20 days in jail. District Representative Mary M. Turnbull pleaded no contest to the felony of committing an illegal act and was sentenced to two years of probation and one day in jail.

McCotter's resignation left the 11th district unrepresented until the November elections, when Democrat David Curson was elected in a special election to finish McCotter's term. Republican Kerry Bentivolio succeeded Curson in January 2013 as the representative of the redrawn 11th district.

== Post-congressional career ==
In January 2014, McCotter launched Thaddeus McCotter's Freedom Asylum, a radio program on FM 92.7 & AM 1400, The Patriot in Detroit. It was canceled by June 2014.

In June 2017, McCotter served as an election observer in the Puerto Rico political-status referendum. McCotter regularly appears on the John Batchelor Show radio program, on Cumulus Media, across the United States.

== Bibliography ==
- Seize Freedom!: American Truths and Renewal in a Chaotic Age, Intercollegiate Studies Institute, 2011
- Bumper Sticker: Made on Motown (unfinished television pilot)

== Personal life ==
McCotter is a practicing Catholic.

In December 2005, McCotter joined with several other Congressmen to form the "Second Amendments", a bipartisan rock and country band set to play for United States troops stationed overseas over the holiday season. He played lead guitar. In June 2006, the band played at President George W. Bush's picnic on the White House lawn, where Bush was quoted calling McCotter "that rock-and-roll dude". McCotter was once in a band called the New Flying Squirrels.

== See also ==
- List of federal political scandals in the United States

U.S. House of Representatives
Preceded by Joe Knollenberg	Member of the U.S. House of Representatives from Michigan's 11th congressional district 2003–2012	Succeeded by David Curson
Party political offices
Preceded by Adam Putnam	Chair of the House Republican Policy Committee; 2007–2011	Succeeded by Tom Price
U.S. order of precedence (ceremonial)
Preceded by Lynn Rivers as Former U.S. Representative	Order of precedence of the United States as Former U.S. Representative	Succeeded by Brenda Lawrence as Former U.S. Representative
