= Imminent Threat =

- Directed by: Janek Ambros
- Produced by: James Cromwell, Anthony A. LoPresti, Jillian Barba, D.J. Dodd,
- Starring: Thomas Campbell; David Boaz; Jodie Evans
- Music by: Corey Wallace
- Distributed by: Mance Media, Java Films
- Release date: September 4, 2015
- Running time: 73 minutes
- Country: United States
- Language: English

Imminent Threat is a 2015 documentary film about the war on terror's impact on civil liberties in the US, as well as the potential coalition that may form between the progressive left and libertarian right. The film is directed by Janek Ambros and executive produced by James Cromwell, Jillian Barba, Anthony A. LoPresti, and D.J. Dodd.

Ambros and Cromwell made their follow up, Mondo hollywoodland in 2021.

== See also ==
- List of American films of 2015
- Military-industrial complex
- Military Keynesianism
