= Ukrainians in Exile =

- Directed by: Janek Ambros
- Produced by: Janusz Kaminski; Janek Ambros
- Production company: Assembly Line Entertainment
- Release dates: October 2022 (Morelia International Film Festival); October 23, 2022
- Language: Ukrainian

Ukrainians in Exile is a 2022 Ukrainian/Polish/American documentary/war film directed by Janek Ambros. Two time Oscar winning Janusz Kaminski produced the film.

The film premiered at the 2022 Morelia International Film Festival in Morelia, Mexico. The documentary was shot in Przemyśl in March 2022.

Ukrayintsi u Vyhnanni (Ukrainians in Exile) comes from director Janek Ambros and was shot in March in the Polish city of Przemyśl. Due to its location near the Ukrainian border, Premzsyl became the starting point for hundreds of thousands of refugees fleeing Ukraine since Russia invaded the country in February. In March, it was reported that up to 50,000 refugees were arriving in the city each day.

Rather than interviewing refugees who fled, the short doc visually depicts the crisis on the border, but is narrated by an anonymous woman, still residing in Ivano-Frankivsk, Ukraine. She speaks in Ukrainian of her experiences and contemplates those who were forced to leave and whether or not other countries will embrace her fellow Ukrainians.

== Critical response ==
Ukrainians in Exile has an approval rating of 100% on review aggregator website Rotten Tomatoes, based on 10 reviews.

The film won "Best Documentary" at the 76th Salerno Film Festival.
