= James Cromwell =

American actor (born 1940)

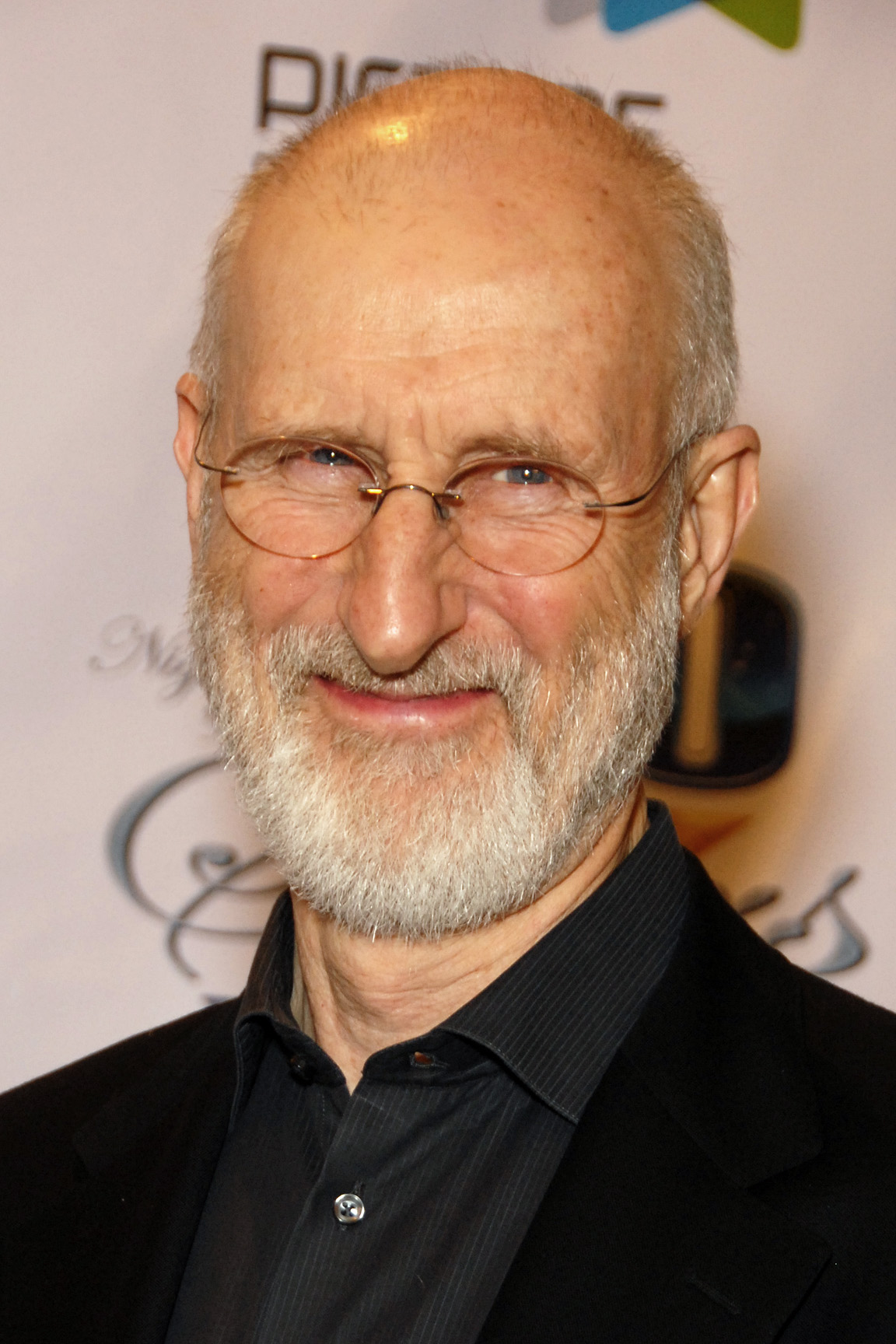
- Cromwell in 2010
- Born: James Oliver Cromwell; January 27, 1940 (age 86); Los Angeles, California, U.S.
- Other name: Jamie Cromwell
- Education: Carnegie Mellon University (BFA)
- Occupation: Actor
- Years active: 1974–present
- Spouses: Anne Ulvestad (m. 1977; div. 1986) Julie Cobb (m. 1986; div. 2005) Anna Stuart (m. 2014)
- Children: 3
- Parents: John Cromwell; Kay Johnson

James Oliver Cromwell (born January 27, 1940) is an American actor. He has received a Primetime Emmy Award as well as a nomination for the Academy Award for Best Supporting Actor for Babe (1995). Other film roles include Star Trek: First Contact (1996), L.A. Confidential (1997), Deep Impact (1998), The Green Mile (1999), Space Cowboys (2000), I, Robot (2004), The Longest Yard (2005), The Queen (2006), Spider-Man 3 (2007), W. (2008), Secretariat (2010), The Artist (2011), Still Mine (2012), The Promise (2016), Marshall (2017), Jurassic World: Fallen Kingdom (2018), and Emperor (2020). He has also voiced characters in several animated films and TV shows, including Spirit: Stallion of the Cimarron (2002) and Big Hero 6 (2014).

Cromwell is also well known for his roles in television including guest starring in 4 episodes of ER (2001), Angels in America (2003), Six Feet Under (2003–2005), The West Wing (2004), American Horror Story: Asylum (2012–2013), for which he won the Primetime Emmy Award for Outstanding Supporting Actor in a Miniseries or a Movie, Boardwalk Empire (2012–2013), The Young Pope (2016), Counterpart (2018–2019), Succession (2018–2023), for which he earned three Primetime Emmy Award nominations for Outstanding Guest Actor, and Sugar (2024).

Cromwell is an activist for causes including animal rights and environmentalism. He has been arrested several times at protests, and served a jail sentence after refusing to pay a fine following a 2015 sit-in protest at a power plant.

== Early life and education ==
James Oliver Cromwell was born in Los Angeles, California on January 27, 1940. He is the son of actress Kay Johnson and actor and director John Cromwell, who was blacklisted during the McCarthy era. His parents divorced in 1946. He has English, German, Irish, and Scottish ancestry. He was raised in Manhattan, New York City. Cromwell graduated from The Hill School in Pottstown, Pennsylvania in 1958, and went on to Middlebury College, and Carnegie Mellon University, where he graduated with a B.F.A. in 1964. He received his acting training at HB Studio.

== Career ==
Cromwell's first television performance was in a 1974 episode of The Rockford Files playing Terry, a tennis instructor. A few weeks later, he began a recurring role as Stretch Cunningham on All in the Family. In 1975, he took his first lead role on television as Bill Lewis in the short-lived Hot l Baltimore, and appeared on M*A*S*H as Captain Leo Bardonaro in the episode "Last Laugh". A year later, he made his film debut in Neil Simon's classic detective spoof Murder by Death. Cromwell portrayed four different characters in four episodes of Barney Miller (1977–1981). In 1977, he appeared in the Three's Company episode "Chrissy's Night Out" as Detective Lannigan.

In 1980, Cromwell guest-starred in the two-part episode "Laura Ingalls Wilder" of the long-running television series Little House on the Prairie. He played Harve Miller, one of Almanzo Wilder's old friends.

While Cromwell continued with regular television work throughout the 1980s, he made appearances in films with supporting roles in Tank, Revenge of the Nerds, and Oh, God! You Devil (all 1984). He guest-starred on the sitcom Night Court, playing a mental patient, along with Kevin Peter Hall. He had a starring role in the critically acclaimed film Babe (1995), for which he received a nomination for the Academy Award for Best Supporting Actor, and reprised his role in the sequel, Babe: Pig in the City (1998). Subsequent roles included Eraser (1996), The People vs. Larry Flynt (1996), The Education of Little Tree (1997), L.A. Confidential (1997), Deep Impact (1998), The Green Mile (1999), The General's Daughter, (1999), Snow Falling on Cedars (1999), Space Cowboys (2000), The Sum of All Fears (2002), I, Robot (2004), and The Longest Yard (2005). He also voiced the Colonel in DreamWorks' Spirit: Stallion of the Cimarron (2002).

Cromwell's first Star Trek role was on Star Trek: The Next Generation in 1990, in the season 3 episode "The Hunted", followed by the 1993 episode "Birthright, Part 1" as Jaglom Shrek. He also played Dr. Zefram Cochrane in Star Trek: First Contact (1996), the Star Trek: Enterprise pilot episode "Broken Bow", and the 2022 Star Trek: Lower Decks season 3 premiere episode, "Grounded". The Star Trek: Enterprise episode "In a Mirror, Darkly" reused some of the First Contact footage. Cromwell also appeared in a Star Trek: Deep Space Nine episode, "Starship Down", as Hanok.

Cromwell's role as newspaper tycoon William Randolph Hearst in the television film RKO 281 (1999) earned him an Emmy Award nomination for Outstanding Supporting Actor in a Television Movie. The following year, he received his second Emmy Award nomination for playing Bishop Lionel Stewart on the NBC medical drama series ER. In 2003, he appeared in the HBO miniseries Angels in America. In 2004, he guest-starred as former president D. Wire Newman in The West Wing episode "The Stormy Present". From 2003 to 2005, Cromwell played George Sibley in the HBO drama series Six Feet Under, which earned him his third Emmy Award nomination in 2003. Along with the rest of his castmates, he was also nominated for two Screen Actors Guild Awards for Best Ensemble in a Drama Series in 2005 and 2006. The following year, Cromwell played Prince Philip, Duke of Edinburgh in The Queen (2006), that earned Helen Mirren an Academy Award for Best Actress. He also guest-starred as Phillip Bauer, father of lead character Jack, in the sixth season of the Fox thriller drama series 24.

In October 2007, Cromwell played the lead role of James Tyrone Sr. in the Druid Theatre Company's production of Eugene O'Neill's Long Day's Journey into Night, at the Gaiety in Dublin as part of the Ulster Bank Dublin Theatre Festival's 50th Anniversary. That same year he received the King Vidor Memorial Award from the San Luis Obispo International Film Festival for his artistic achievements in film. He also starred as Captain George Stacy in Sam Raimi's Spider-Man 3 (2007). Cromwell played George H. W. Bush in Oliver Stone's W. (2008), that chronicles the rise to power of Bush's son up until the 2003 invasion of Iraq.

Cromwell played the Older Canter in the sci-fi thriller Surrogates (2009), starred as horse owner Ogden Phipps in Disney's Secretariat (2010), portrayed Clifton in the Academy Award-winning The Artist (2011), and starred in the romantic drama Still Mine (2012). From 2012 to 2013, he appeared in the HBO series Boardwalk Empire. Cromwell also provided the voice of the main villain Professor Robert Callaghan/Yokai in the Disney movie Big Hero 6 (2014). His subsequent film roles have included The Promise (2016), Marshall (2017), and Jurassic World: Fallen Kingdom (2018).

In 2015, Cromwell executive produced the documentary Imminent Threat which tackles the War on Terror's impact on civil liberties. In 2016, Cromwell starred in HBO's series The Young Pope alongside Jude Law and Diane Keaton. In 2018, he appeared in HBO's Succession, and Starz's Counterpart. In 2020, Cromwell starred in the Australian comedy-drama film Never Too Late, and in the historical drama film Emperor. Cromwell starred in Operation Buffalo, an Australian television comedy-drama series about the atomic bomb tests in outback Australia, which screened on ABC from 31 May 2020. He is currently featured in the HBO Max show Julia, as Julia Child's father, John McWilliams. In 2021, Cromwell executive produced the psychedelic comedy Mondo Hollywoodland, directed by Janek Ambros, who also directed Imminent Threat.

== Activism ==
Cromwell has long been an advocate of progressive causes, particularly regarding animal rights. He became a vegetarian in 1974 after seeing a stockyard in Texas and experiencing the "smell, terror and anxiety". He became vegan while playing the character of Farmer Hoggett in the 1995 film Babe. He frequently speaks out on issues regarding animal cruelty for PETA, largely on the treatment of pigs. Cromwell served as the narrator of the short film Farm to Fridge, a documentary produced by Mercy for Animals.

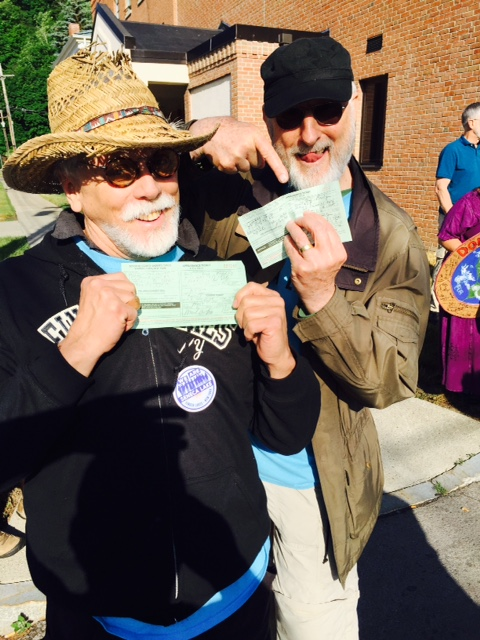
Cromwell and J. G. Hertzler show their arrest citations at the Crestwood station protest, 2016

In February 2013, Cromwell was arrested along with animal rights activist Jeremy Beckham for interrupting a University of Wisconsin Board of Regents meeting while showing a graphic photo of a cat to protest about alleged mistreatment of animals on campus. The incident, which garnered widespread press coverage, was resolved on March 25, 2013, when an attorney representing Cromwell entered no-contest pleas to the non-criminal offense and agreed to pay $100 forfeitures and court costs of $263.50. In December 2015, he was removed from an event in New York for heckling an energy company receiving an award.

On December 18, 2015, Cromwell and five others were arrested while protesting against the construction of a natural gas power station in Wawayanda, New York, near his home in Warwick, New York. He and his fellow protesters, called the "Wawayanda Six", were convicted of disorderly conduct and obstruction of traffic. They were fined $375, due June 29, 2017, and sentenced to 16 hours of community service. After refusing to pay the fine, Cromwell was sentenced to a week in jail, scheduled to go on July 14. However, they were released three days later on July 17.

Cromwell and his fellow Star Trek actor J. G. Hertzler were among the 19 people arrested in Watkins Glen, New York, on June 6, 2016, for a protest against underground gas storage in salt caverns near Seneca Lake. On June 6, 2017, he was escorted out of a Democratic Party fundraiser (which New York Governor Andrew Cuomo and House Minority leader Nancy Pelosi attended) after disrupting the event by protesting about the power station. Cromwell was again arrested, this time for trespassing after taking part in a protest with PETA at SeaWorld on July 24.

On October 31, 2019, Cromwell was arrested with 34-year-old animal rights activist Jeremy Beckham. They were charged with disorderly conduct after police said they disrupted a meeting of the Texas A&M University System Board of Regents. The two were part of a demonstration by PETA, protesting A&M's use of dogs for medical research. Both were released after posting bonds of $5,000 each.

In May 2022, Cromwell superglued his hand to the counter of a Manhattan Starbucks to protest the surcharge for plant-based milks. Later that year, PETA named him their 2022 Person of the Year. In April 2023, he helped rehome a pig destined for slaughter to the Indraloka Animal Sanctuary and named the pig "Babe".

== Personal life ==
Cromwell married Ann Ulvestad in 1977. They divorced in 1986. Together the couple had three children: Kate, John and Colin. Cromwell married actress Julie Cobb on May 29, 1986; they divorced in 2005. James Cromwell dated drama teacher Joan MacIntosh from 2005 until 2009. On January 1, 2014, Cromwell married actress Anna Stuart at the home of Stuart's former Another World co-star Charles Keating. Cromwell lives in Warwick, New York.

At 6 ft 7 in (2.01 m), Cromwell is the tallest actor nominated for an Academy Award. His son John is taller, at 6 ft 8 in (2.03 m). In the 2012 film Memorial Day, John played the young Bud Vogel, while James played him as a grandfather. Both Cromwells appear as the same character at different ages in American Horror Story: Asylum (2012) and the first season of Betrayal (2013).

=== Political views ===
Cromwell's experiences of the Civil Rights Movement while on a theatre tour through several Deep South states in 1964 had a profound effect on him. The courage of local campaigners and visiting activists – Cromwell had played high school football with civil rights worker Mickey Schwerner, who was murdered with two of his colleagues in Mississippi in 1964 – convinced him to become an activist. He subsequently became involved in the anti-Vietnam War movement, and by the late 1960s, Cromwell was a member of the Committee to Defend the Panthers, a group organized to defend 13 members of the Black Panther Party who had been imprisoned in New York on charges of conspiracy. All 13 were eventually found innocent and released. In a 2004 interview with CNN, Cromwell praised the Panthers.

In an October 2008 interview, Cromwell criticized the Republican Party and the George W. Bush administration, saying that their foreign policy would "either destroy us or the entire planet". He supported the presidential campaign of Bernie Sanders in the 2016 U.S. presidential election.

== Awards and nominations ==
Year	Award	Category	Nominated work	Result	Ref.
1995	Academy Awards	Best Supporting Actor	Babe	Nominated	
2000	Primetime Emmy Awards	Outstanding Supporting Actor in a Limited Series or Movie	RKO 281	Nominated	
2001	Primetime Emmy Awards	Outstanding Guest Actor in a Drama Series	ER	Nominated	
2003	Primetime Emmy Awards	Outstanding Guest Actor in a Drama Series	Six Feet Under	Nominated	
2013	Primetime Emmy Awards	Outstanding Supporting Actor in a Limited Series or Movie	American Horror Story: Asylum	Won	
2020	Primetime Emmy Awards	Outstanding Guest Actor in a Drama Series	Succession (episode: "Dundee")	Nominated	
2022	Primetime Emmy Awards	Outstanding Guest Actor in a Drama Series	Succession (episode: "Retired Janitors of Idaho")	Nominated	
2023	Primetime Emmy Awards	Outstanding Guest Actor in a Drama Series	Succession (episode: "Church and State")	Nominated	
1997	Screen Actors Guild Awards	Outstanding Cast in a Motion Picture	L.A. Confidential	Nominated	
1999	Screen Actors Guild Awards	Outstanding Cast in a Motion Picture	The Green Mile	Nominated	
2004	Screen Actors Guild Awards	Outstanding Ensemble in a Drama Series	Six Feet Under	Nominated	
2005	Screen Actors Guild Awards	Outstanding Ensemble in a Drama Series	Six Feet Under	Nominated	
2011	Screen Actors Guild Awards	Outstanding Cast in a Motion Picture	The Artist	Nominated	

== See also ==
- List of animal rights advocates
