= Mondo Hollywoodland =

- Directed by: Janek Ambros
- Produced by: James Cromwell; Janek Ambros; Chris Blim
- Starring: Chris Blim; Alex Loynaz; Alyssa Sabo
- Production companies: Assembly Line Entertainment; Good Hammer TV
- Distributed by: Green Apple Entertainment
- Release dates: October 2019 (DTLA Film Festival); August 30, 2021
- Running time: 105 minutes
- Country: United States
- Language: English

Mondo Hollywoodland is a 2019 American comedy/sci fi film directed by Janek Ambros and starring Chris Blim, Alex Loynaz and Alyssa Sabo. Oscar nominated actor/activist James Cromwell is an executive producer and presenter on the film.

The film premiered at the 2019 DTLA Film Festival in Los Angeles. It was released in theaters on July 30, 2021, and on SVOD on August 3 on Amazon Prime.

The film received positive reviews in its initial release window.

== Plot ==
An homage to the counter culture films of the 60s, the film follows a groovy mushrooms dealer who encounters movie industry types, political fringe groups, and psychedelic folk in Los Angeles to discover the meaning of "Mondo."

== Production ==
The film began development in 2015 and began production in 2018. It was inspired by the cult classic Mondo Hollywood.

Members of the Polish film industry awarded James Cromwell the Pola Negri award in 2021 for his collaboration and contribution to filmmaker Janek Ambros and paired the award with a screening the film.

== Reception ==
=== Critical response ===
Mono Hollywoodland has an approval rating of 88% on review aggregator website Rotten Tomatoes, based on 17 reviews.
