= Reggie Brown (impersonator) =

American entertainer (born 1980)

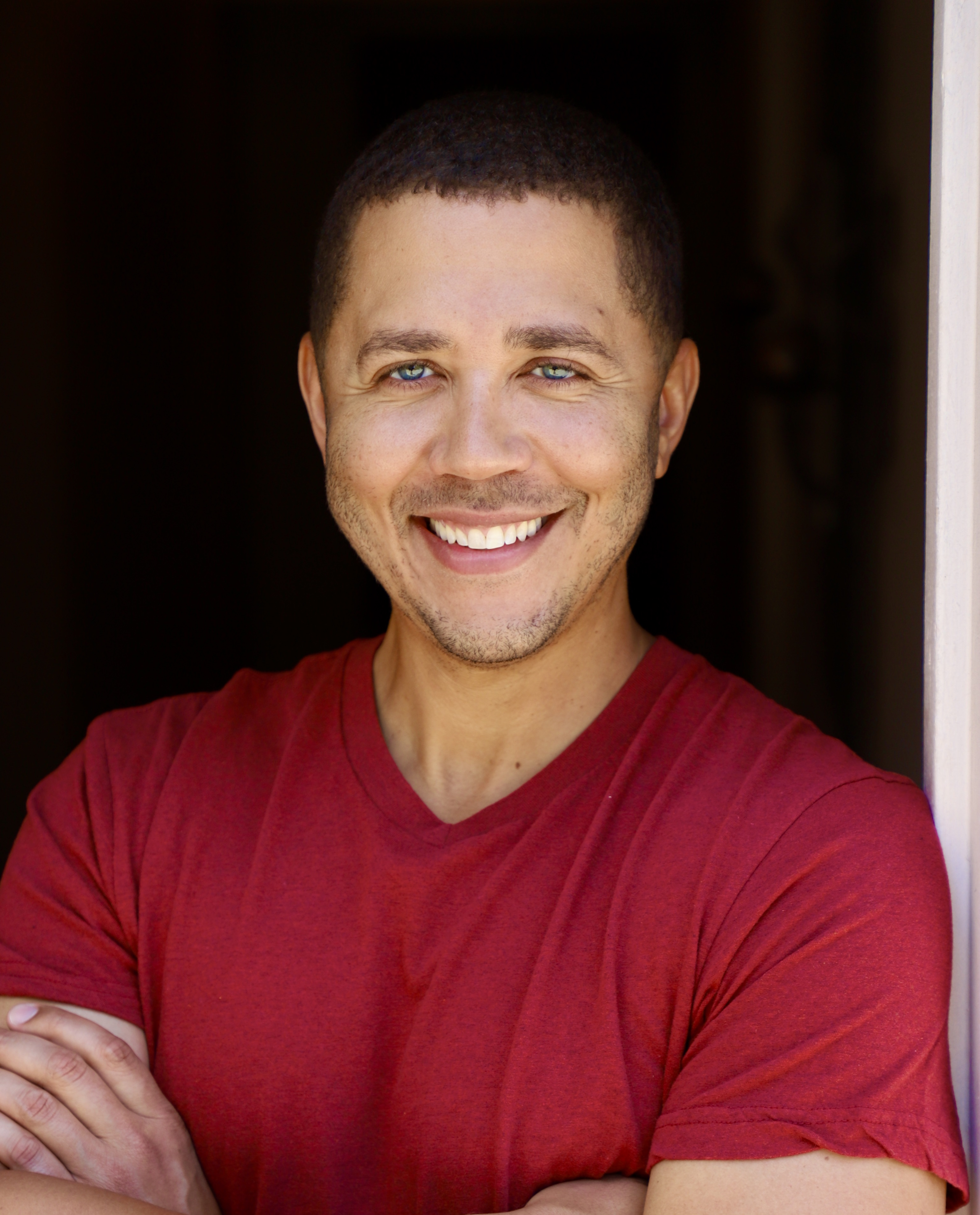
- Born: Reginald Dennis Odell II; 1980 (age 45–46); Maywood, Chicago, Illinois, U.S.

Comedy career
- Medium: Impersonation, comedy
- Genre: Impersonations
- Subjects: Politics, popular culture

Reginald Dennis Odell II (born 1980) is an American actor, writer and comedic impersonator and look-alike of former U.S. President Barack Obama.

Brown first made international headlines due to the controversy surrounding his performance at the 2011 Republican Leadership Conference, his occasional television appearances, and his activity on YouTube.

== Early life and education ==
Brown is a native of Chicago, and was born Reginald Dennis Odell II in Maywood, Illinois, a suburb of Chicago. Brown was born to a white mother and black father. When Brown was five years old, his father and mother separated leaving her to raise Reggie and his older brother Lawrence on her own. At the age of 9, his mother married his step father, Lawrence Brown. A year later his step father was diagnosed with leukemia and began a 3-year battle with the disease. At the age of 13, his step father died, leaving Brown and his siblings to be raised by a single mother.

Brown attended the University of Illinois at Urbana–Champaign before dropping out of college to pursue a career in modeling. After joining Ford Model Management, he enrolled at The Acting Studios Chicago to take voice and acting classes.

== Career ==
=== Local reporter ===
From 2006 to 2008, Brown worked as a blogger for WMAQ-TV's Street Team, where he covered local events. On September 9, 2008, Brown won an Emmy for 'Outstanding Achievement for Alternate Media/ New Media Interactivity' for his contributions to the coverage of Looptopia Live as part of the Street Team from the Chicago/Midwest Chapter of The National Academy of Television Arts And Sciences.

=== Obama impersonator ===
Brown claims that he first learned of his resemblance to Barack Obama at the age of 21, when Obama was still an Illinois state legislator. Brown's career as a professional impersonator was launched by a series of appearances on Fox Business Network, starting with a mock debate against Representative Ron Paul on Stossel. Brown subsequently appeared on Stossel for similar mock debates with Governor Gary Johnson and Herman Cain.

=== 2011 Republican Leadership Conference controversy ===
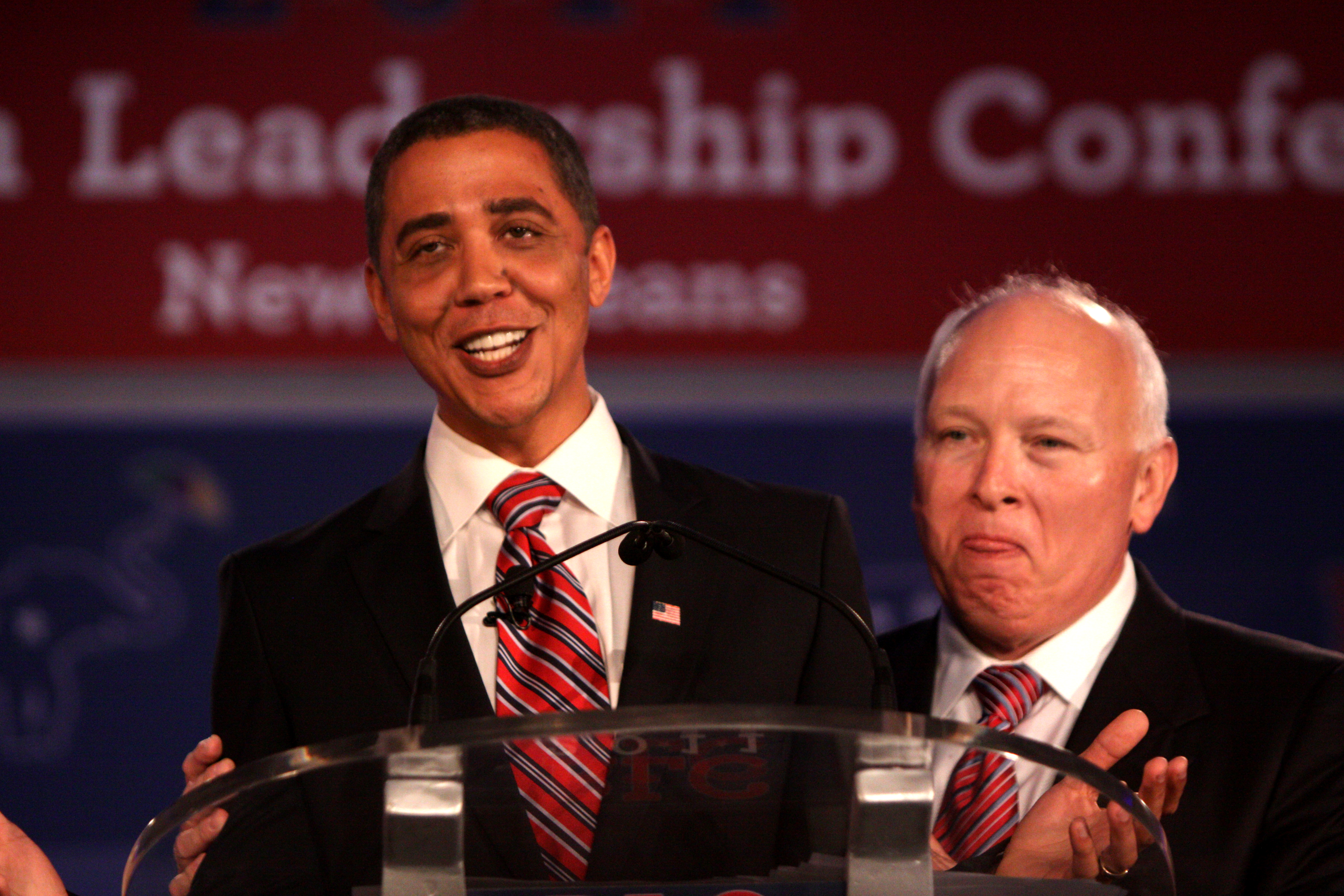
Brown's controversial 2011 Republican Leadership Conference performance being ended early by Conference Chairman Charlie Davis amid allegations of racism

Brown was the subject of a national controversy in June 2011 when, during a nationally televised performance by Brown at the Republican Leadership Conference, he was cut off mid-sentence by Conference Chairman Charlie Davis. Davis told CNN that he ended Brown's performance because the Conference has a "zero tolerance [policy] for racially insensitive jokes." At first, Brown disputed the factual basis of Davis' statement, claiming that the performance was ended because Brown "was over [his] time by a few minutes." Later, Brown responded to the allegations of racism by stating that he "didn't hear any boos on any of the racial jokes" and that he felt "very safe delivering content like that" because he and the President are of a similar mixed racial background. "I wouldn't touch anything that I don't think the President would feel comfortable with or hasn't done himself. He is someone I respect. I want to make him happy," said Brown.

In the aftermath of the 2011 Republican Leadership Conference incident, Brown was invited by comedian Bill Maher to finish his act on HBO's Real Time with Bill Maher.

=== YouTube activity ===
Brown appeared in a viral YouTube parody of Psy's hit song Gangnam Style, entitled Obama Gangnam Style! The video received over 100 million views all over the world including over 30 million views from Twitter users in China, who reportedly believed that the real President Obama was responsible for the video. He also impersonated Obama in the ALS Ice Bucket Challenge, and in the 2016 U.S. presidential election he debuted a cross between Obama and Donald Trump, speaking popular Trump quotes, on CollegeHumor. He gave a similar performance in 2017 on Real Time with Bill Maher in a segment called "New Rule: What If Obama Said It?"

== Filmography ==
Year	Film	Role	Notes
2008	The Obama Effect	Barack Obama	
2010	Hannah Montana	Barack Obama	
2010	iCarly	Barack Obama	2 episodes
2010	Lopez Tonight	Barack Obama	
2010	Piscopo After Dark	Barack Obama	
2011	Jimmy Kimmel Live!	Barack Obama	
2011	Real Time with Bill Maher	Barack Obama	
2011	Stossel	Barack Obama	3 episodes
2011	The Tonight Show with Jay Leno	Barack Obama	
2011	Workaholics	Barack Obama	
2011	WWE Capitol Punishment	Barack Obama	
2011	Mr. Bam Redistributes Your Wealth	Mr. Bam	
2012	Real Time with Bill Maher	Barack Obama	2 episodes
2012	Huckabee	Barack Obama	10 episodes
2012	Fred: The Show	Barack Obama	1 episode
2013	Funny Or Die	Drake	1 episode
2013	Goodbye World	Barack Obama	Movie
2013	Austin & Ally	Barack Obama	1 episode
2014	I Didn't Do It	Barack Obama	1 episode
2014	Nicky, Ricky, Dicky & Dawn	Barack Obama	1 episode
2015	Nickelodeon's Ho Ho Holiday Special	Barack Obama	TV special
2016	Barbershop: The Next Cut	Barack Obama	Film
2017	War Machine	Barack Obama	Film

== Personal life ==
Brown currently resides in Los Angeles, California. When asked about his political affiliation by NewsOne, Brown refused to comment as to whether he is a Democrat or Republican, stating that he is simply an "entertainer."
