= 2016 Hawaii's 1st congressional district special election =

Election in Hawaii

- November 8, 2016

Hawaii's 1st congressional district
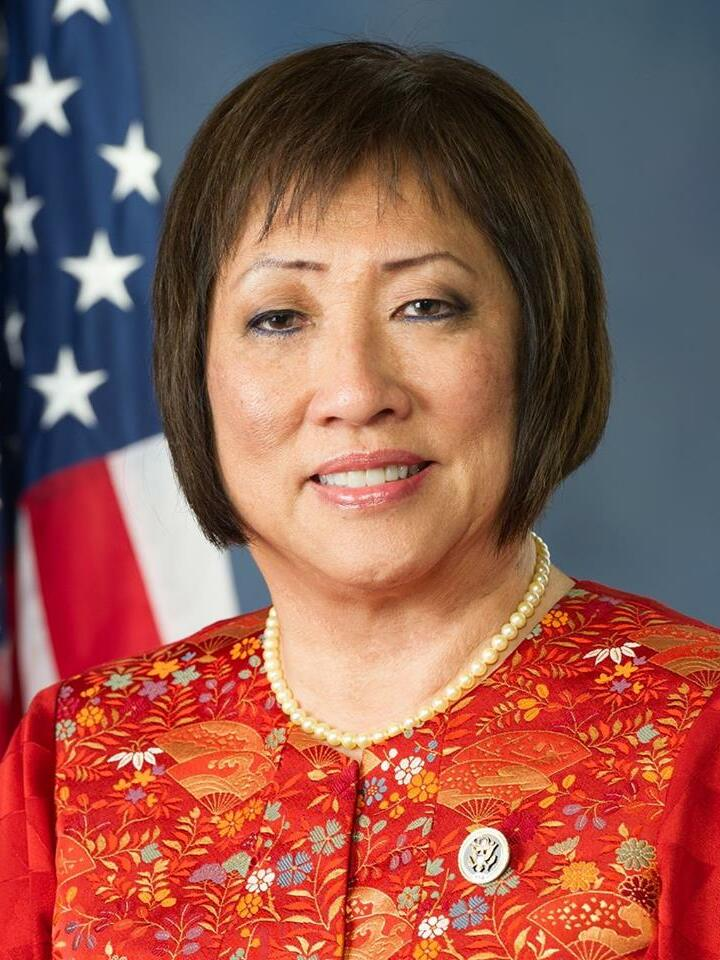

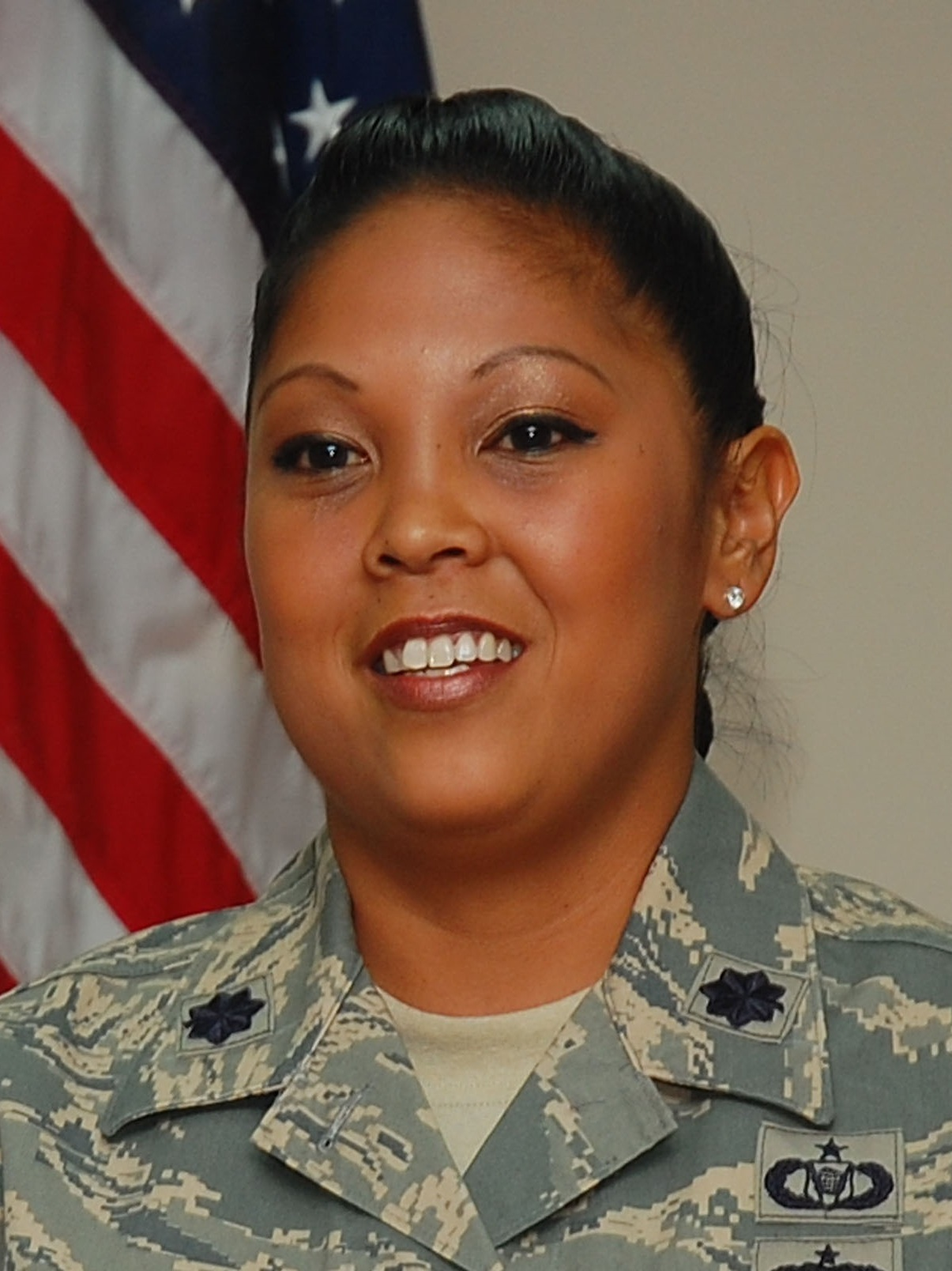
Candidate	Colleen Hanabusa	Shirl Ostrov
Party	Democratic	Republican
Popular vote	129,083	44,090
Percentage	65.1%	22.2%
- Hanabusa: 30–40% 40–50% 50–60% 60–70% 70–80% Ostrov: 40–50% No votes
Representative before election
Mark Takai
Democratic
Elected Representative
Colleen Hanabusa
Democratic

U.S. Representative Mark Takai, who represented Hawaii's 1st congressional district, died July 20, 2016. A special election was held November 8, 2016. In special elections in Hawaii, all candidates run on one ballot with the highest vote recipient winning regardless of percentage. That is what allowed Republican Charles Djou to win the 2010 special election for this seat with 39.4% of the vote when two Democrats took 58.4% of the vote combined. However this special election was held on the same ballot as the regularly scheduled election for this seat to the 115th Congress.

== Candidates ==
Candidate filing took place from August 15 to August 25.

=== Declared ===
==== Democratic Party ====
- Colleen Hanabusa, former U.S. Representative

==== Republican Party ====
- Shirlene Dela Cruz Ostrov, retired U.S. Air Force Colonel

== Results ==
Hawaii's 1st congressional district special election, 2016
Party	Candidate	Votes	%
Democratic	Colleen Hanabusa	129,083	65.1
Republican	Shirlene D. Ostrov	44,090	22.2
Democratic	Angela Aulani Kaaihue	5,885	3.0
Libertarian	Alan J.K. Yim	5,559	2.8
Democratic	Howard Kim	4,259	2.1
Democratic	Peter Cross	3,420	1.7
Nonpartisan	Calvin Griffin	2,824	1.4
Democratic	Javier Ocasio	1,893	1.0
Nonpartisan	Yvonne Perry	1,050	0.5
Nonpartisan	Peter H. Plotzeneder	328	0.2
Total votes		198,391	100.0
Democratic hold			

== See also ==
- List of special elections to the United States House of Representatives
