= Electoral history of Tulsi Gabbard =

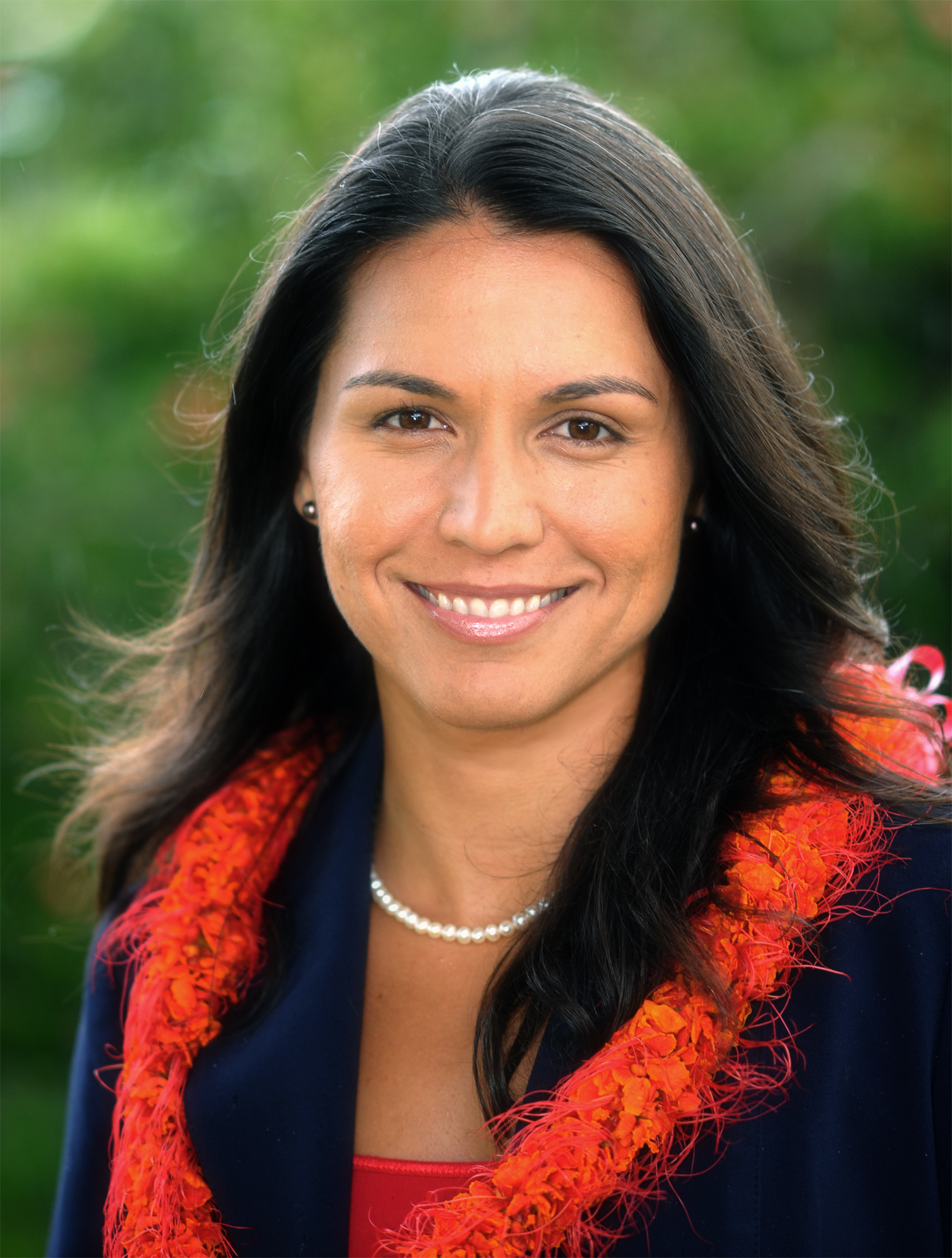
Representative Tulsi Gabbard in August 2011

The following list is the electoral history of Tulsi Gabbard. Tulsi Gabbard previously served as a member of the Hawaii House of Representatives, the Honolulu City Council, and is a former member of the United States House of Representatives.

== Hawaii House of Representatives elections (2002, 2004) ==
Hawaii House of Representatives primary election, 2002
Party	Candidate	Votes	%
Democratic	Tulsi Gabbard Tamayo	1,095	48.1
Democratic	Rida T.R. Cabanilla	682	29.9
Democratic	Rodolfo V. Ramos	406	17.8
Democratic	Gerald Vidal	95	4.2

Hawaii House of Representatives general election, 2002
Party	Candidate	Votes	%
Democratic	Tulsi Gabbard Tamayo	3,106	64.9
Republican	Alfonso Jimenez	1,682	35.1

Hawaii House of Representatives Democratic general election, 2004
Party	Candidate	Votes	%
Democratic	Rida T.R. Cabanilla	1,463	58.0
Democratic	Tulsi Gabbard Tamayo (incumbent) suspended campaign	579	22.9
Democratic	Genero Q. Bimbo	158	6.3
Democratic	Gerald Vidal	96	3.8
Blank ballots		227	9.0

== Honolulu City Council elections (2010) ==
Honolulu City Council primary election, 2010
Party	Candidate	Votes	%
Nonpartisan	Tulsi Gabbard Tamayo	6,468	37.6
Nonpartisan	Sesnita Der-Ling Moepono	3,957	23.0
Nonpartisan	Shawn Hamamoto	2,087	12.1
Nonpartisan	Frank A. Lavoie	1,896	11.0
Nonpartisan	Christopher J. Wong	1,383	8.0
Nonpartisan	Bob Vieira	699	4.1
Nonpartisan	Larry Fenton	279	1.6
Nonpartisan	Tim Garry	219	1.3
Nonpartisan	Carlton N. Middleton	194	1.1

Honolulu City Council general election, 2010
Party	Candidate	Votes	%
Nonpartisan	Tulsi Gabbard Tamayo	15,060	58.5
Nonpartisan	Sesnita Der-Ling Moepono	10,682	41.5

== United States House of Representatives elections ==
=== 2012 ===
United States House of Representatives primary election, 2012
Party	Candidate	Votes	%
Democratic	Tulsi Gabbard	62,882	55.1
Democratic	Mufi Hannemann	39,176	34.3
Democratic	Esther Kiaʻāina	6,681	5.9
Democratic	Bob Marx	4,327	3.8
Democratic	Miles Shiratori	573	0.5
Democratic	Rafael del Castillo	520	0.5

United States House of Representatives general election, 2012
Party	Candidate	Votes	%
Democratic	Tulsi Gabbard	168,503	80.5
Republican	Kawika Crowley	40,707	19.5

=== 2014 ===
United States House of Representatives primary election, 2014
Party	Candidate	Votes	%
Democratic	Tulsi Gabbard	92,032	100

United States House of Representatives general election, 2014
Party	Candidate	Votes	%
Democratic	Tulsi Gabbard	142,010	78.7
Republican	Kawika Crowley	33,630	18.6
Libertarian	Joe Kent	4,693	2.6

=== 2016 ===
United States House of Representatives primary election, 2016
Party	Candidate	Votes	%
Democratic	Tulsi Gabbard	80,026	84.5
Democratic	Shay Chan Hodges	14,643	15.5

United States House of Representatives general election, 2016
Party	Candidate	Votes	%
Democratic	Tulsi Gabbard	170,829	81.2
Republican	Angela Aulani Kaaihue	39,664	18.8

=== 2018 ===
United States House of Representatives primary election, 2018
Party	Candidate	Votes	%
Democratic	Tulsi Gabbard	94,665	83.6
Democratic	Sherry Alu Campagna	13,947	12.3
Democratic	Anthony Tony Austin	4,692	4.1

United States House of Representatives general election, 2018
Party	Candidate	Votes	%
Democratic	Tulsi Gabbard	153,271	77.36
Republican	Brian Evans	44,850	22.64

== 2020 United States presidential election ==
=== Primary vote ===
2020 Democratic Party presidential primaries
Party	Candidate	Votes	%
Democratic	Joe Biden	19,076,052	51.79
Democratic	Bernie Sanders	9,679,213	26.28
Democratic	Elizabeth Warren	2,831,472	7.69
Democratic	Mike Bloomberg	2,488,734	6.76
Democratic	Pete Buttigieg	924,237	2.51
Democratic	Amy Klobuchar	529,713	1.44
Democratic	Tulsi Gabbard	273,940	0.74
Democratic	Tom Steyer	259,792	0.71
Democratic	Andrew Yang	170,517	0.46
Democratic	Others	600,286	1.63
Total votes		36,833,956	100.00
