= 2014 United States House of Representatives elections in Hawaii =

- November 4, 2014

All 2 Hawaii seats to the United States House of Representatives
	Majority party	Minority party
Party	Democratic	Republican
Last election	2	0
Seats won	2	0
Seat change	Steady	Steady
Popular vote	235,400	120,084
Percentage	65.36%	33.34%
Swing	▼2.09%	▲0.79%

Democratic
50–60%
70–80%
80–90%

The 2014 United States House of Representatives elections in Hawaii were held on Tuesday, November 4, 2014, to elect the two U.S. representatives from the state of Hawaii, one from each of the state's two congressional districts. The elections coincided with the elections of other federal and state offices, including an election for governor of Hawaii and a special election to the United States Senate.

== Overview ==
United States House of Representatives elections in Hawaii, 2014
Party	Votes	Percentage	Seats before	Seats after	+/–
Democratic	235,400	65.36%	2	2	±0
Republican	120,084	33.34%	0	0	±0
Libertarian	4,693	1.30%	0	0	-
Totals	360,177	100.00%	2	2	±0

=== By district ===
Results of the 2014 United States House of Representatives elections in Hawaii by district:

District	Democratic		Republican		Others		Total		Result
District	Votes	%	Votes	%	Votes	%	Votes	%	Result
District 1	93,390	51.91%	86,454	48.06%	58	0.03%	179,902	100.0%	Democratic hold
District 2	142,010	78.71%	33,630	18.64%	4,775	2.65%	180,415	100.0%	Democratic hold
Total	235,400	65.33%	120,084	33.33%	4,833	1.34%	360,317	100.0%	

== District 1 ==
United States House of Representatives District 1
- November 4, 2014
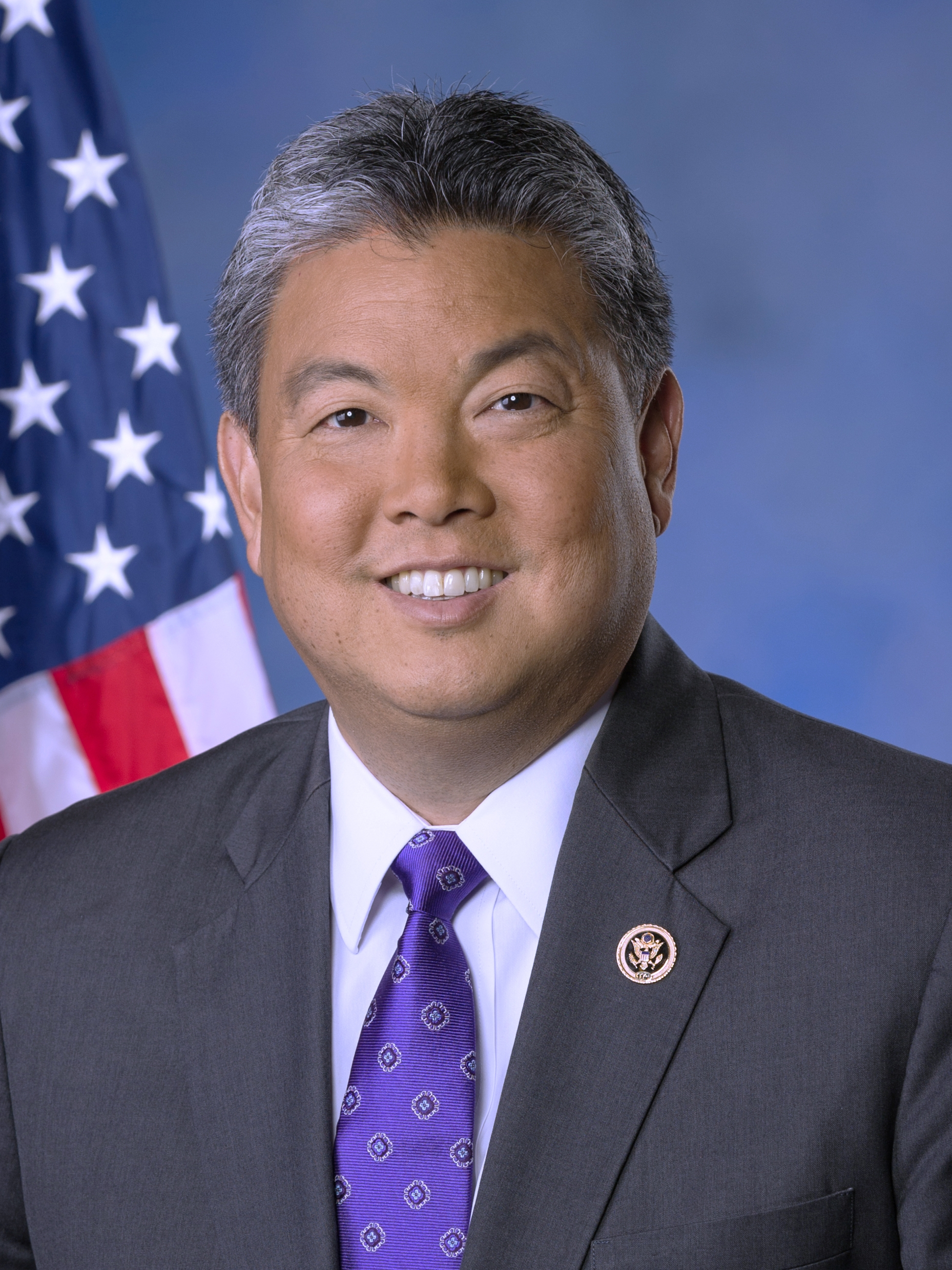

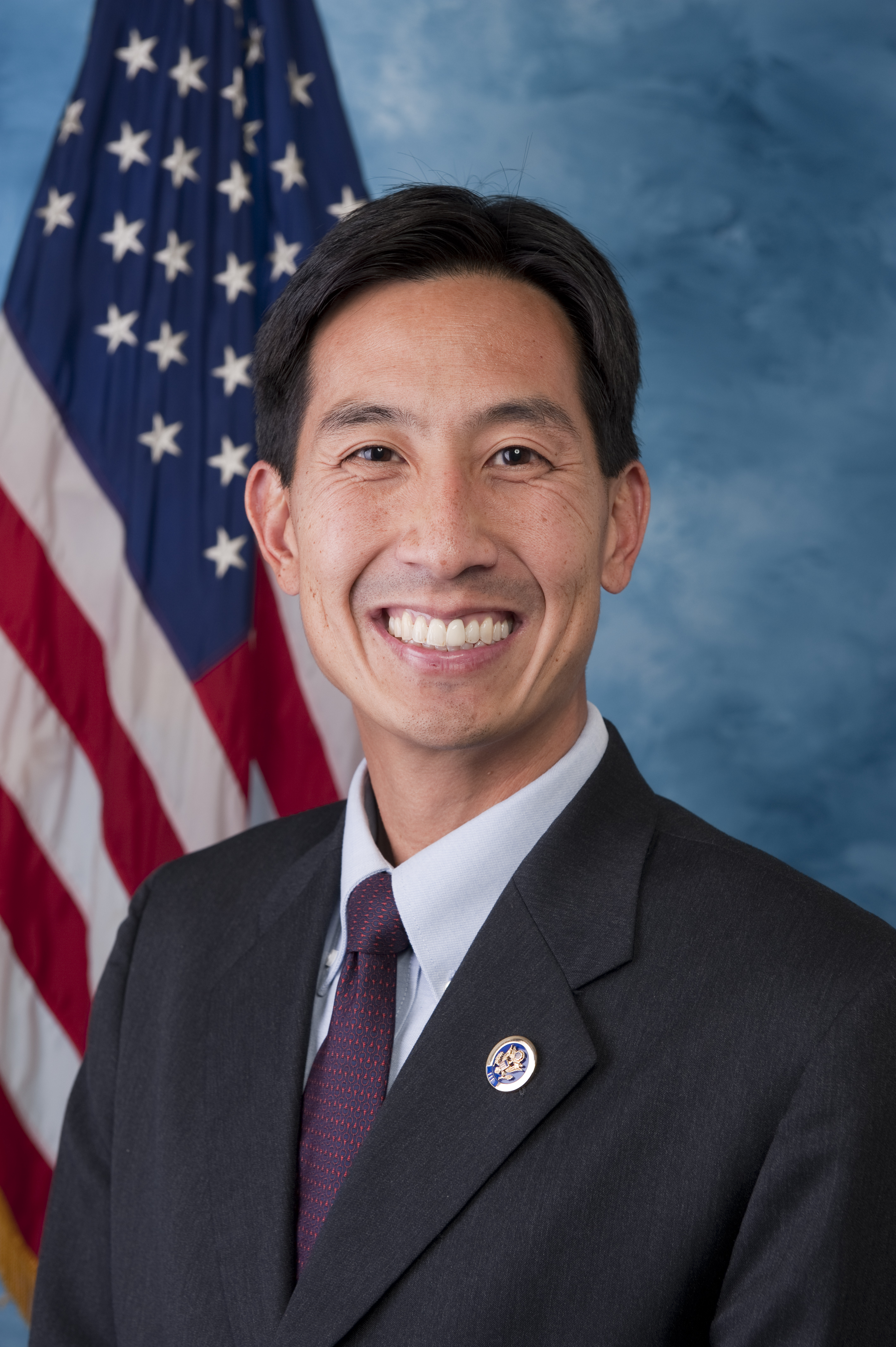
Nominee	Mark Takai	Charles Djou
Party	Democratic	Republican
Popular vote	93,390	86,454
Percentage	51.9%	48.1%
- Precinct results Takai: 50–60% 60–70% Djou: 50–60% 60–70% 70–80% No votes
U.S. Representative before election
Colleen Hanabusa
Democratic
Elected U.S. Representative
Mark Takai
Democratic

The 1st district is located entirely on the island of Oahu, encompassing the urban areas of the City and County of Honolulu, a consolidated city-county that includes Oahu's central plains and southern shores, including the towns of Aiea, Mililani, Pearl City, Waipahu and Waimalu. It is the only majority-Asian district in the United States. The incumbent was Democrat Colleen Hanabusa, who had represented the district since 2011. She was re-elected with 55% of the vote in 2012. The district had a PVI of D+18.

On December 17, 2012, after the death of U.S. Senator Daniel Inouye, it was announced that he had sent a letter shortly before his death to the Governor of Hawaii, Neil Abercrombie, stating his desire that Hanabusa be appointed to his seat. Abercrombie decided against appointing Hanabusa and chose Lieutenant Governor of Hawaii Brian Schatz instead. Hanabusa declined to run for re-election, instead challenging Schatz in the Democratic primary for the special Senate election. She was defeated by Schatz, 48.5% to 47.8%.

=== Democratic primary ===
==== Candidates ====
===== Nominee =====
- Mark Takai, state representative

===== Eliminated in primary =====
- Ikaika Anderson, Honolulu City Councilmember
- Stanley Chang, Honolulu City Councilmember
- Will Espero, state senator
- Donna Mercado Kim, president of the Hawaii Senate
- Joey Manahan, Honolulu City Councilmember and former state representative
- Kathryn Xian, women's rights and anti-human trafficking activist

===== Declined =====
- Ed Case, former U.S. representative and candidate for the U.S. Senate in 2006 and 2012
- Colleen Hanabusa, incumbent U.S. representative
- Mufi Hannemann, former mayor of Honolulu, candidate for governor in 2010 and candidate for Hawaii's 2nd congressional district in 2012 (running for governor)
- Daniel Dae Kim, actor

==== Endorsements ====
Ikaika Anderson

State legislators

- Brickwood Galuteria, majority leader of the Hawaii Senate
- Fred Hemmings, former state senator

Labor unions

- Hawaii Masons Union, Local 1 and Local 630
- Hawaii Regional Council of Carpenters
- International Union of Operating Engineers Local 3
- Laborers' International Union of North America Local 368
Stanley Chang

U.S. representatives

- Keith Ellison, congressman (MN-05) and co-chair of the Congressional Progressive Caucus
- Alan Grayson, U.S. representative for Florida's 9th congressional district
- Raul Grijalva, congressman (AZ-07) and co-chair of the Congressional Progressive Caucus

Statewide officials

- Steven Levinson, retired associate justice of the Supreme Court of Hawaii

Organizations

- Congressional Progressive Caucus
Donna Mercado Kim

Labor unions

- International Brotherhood of Electrical Workers Local 1260

Organizations

- EMILY's List
Mark Takai

U.S. representatives

- Tammy Duckworth, U.S. representative (D-IL)
- Mike Honda, U.S. representative (D-CA)
- Mark Takano, U.S. representative (D-CA)

Labor unions

- American Postal Workers Union
- Hawaii State Teachers Association
- Ironworkers Local 625
- United Food and Commercial Workers

Organizations

- American Optometric Association
- Sierra Club of Hawaii
- VoteVets.org
Kathryn Xian

Individuals

- Gloria Steinem, feminist journalist and political activist

==== Polling ====
Poll source	Date(s) administered	Sample size	Margin of error	Ikaika Anderson	Stanley Chang	Will Espero	Donna Mercado Kim	Joey Manahan	Mark Takai	Kathryn Xian	Undecided
Ward Research	July 21–29, 2014	306	± 5.6%	9%	12%	5%	28%	5%	28%	2%	13%
Civil Beat	July 24–28, 2014	482	± 4.5%	7%	15%	5%	23%	6%	30%	—	14%
Civil Beat	May 18–19, 2014	259	± 6.1%	7%	9%	6%	30%	1%	24%	—	23%
Civil Beat	February 12–15, 2014	323	± 5.4%	5%	7%	8%	25%	—	20%	—	36%
Ward Research	Jan. 29–Feb. 3, 2014	272	± 5.9%	10%	10%	6%	31%	—	21%	2%	21%

==== Results ====
Democratic primary results
Party	Candidate	Votes	%
Democratic	Mark Takai	52,736	44.5
Democratic	Donna Mercado Kim	33,678	28.4
Democratic	Stanley Chang	12,135	10.2
Democratic	Ikaika Anderson	7,937	6.7
Democratic	Will Espero	4,555	3.8
Democratic	Joey Manahan	4,495	3.8
Democratic	Kathryn Xian	3,039	2.6
Total votes		118,575	100.0

=== Republican primary ===
==== Candidates ====
===== Nominee =====
- Charles Djou, former U.S. representative

===== Eliminated in primary =====
- Allan Levene, technology businessman

===== Declined =====
- Linda Lingle, former governor and nominee for the U.S. Senate in 2012

==== Results ====
Republican primary results
Party	Candidate	Votes	%
Republican	Charles Djou	20,802	96.4
Republican	Allan Levene	777	3.6
Total votes		21,579	100.0

=== No party primary ===
==== Candidates ====
===== Declared =====
- Calvin G. Griffin
- Robert H. Meyer

==== Results ====
Independent primary results
Party	Candidate	Votes	%
Independent	Robert H. Meyer	99	25.78
Independent	Calvin G. Griffin	94	24.48
Independent	Blank votes	191	49.74
Total votes		384	100

Neither of the candidates polled enough votes to meet Hawaii's strict criteria for independents to participate in the general election.

=== General election ===
==== Polling ====
Poll source	Date(s) administered	Sample size	Margin of error	Mark Takai (D)	Charles Djou (R)	Undecided
New York Times/CBS News Battleground Tracker	October 16–23, 2014	558	± 8.0%	50%	35%	15%
Civil Beat	October 16–19, 2014	604	± 4%	45%	45%	9%
Ward Research	October 11–18, 2014	354	± 5.2%	47%	47%	7%
Global Strategy Group (D-DCCC)	October 20–21, 2014	400	± 4.9%	49%	42%	9%
Civil Beat	September 11–14, 2014	551	± 4.2%	42%	46%	12%

==== Predictions ====
Source	Ranking	As of
The Cook Political Report	Lean D	November 3, 2014
Rothenberg	Lean D	October 24, 2014
Sabato's Crystal Ball	Lean D	October 30, 2014
RCP	Tossup	November 2, 2014
Daily Kos Elections	Lean D	November 4, 2014

==== Results ====
Hawaii's 1st congressional district, 2014
Party	Candidate	Votes	%
Democratic	Mark Takai	93,390	51.9
Republican	Charles Djou	86,454	48.1
Total votes		179,844	100.0
Democratic hold			

== District 2 ==
United States House of Representatives District 2
- November 4, 2014
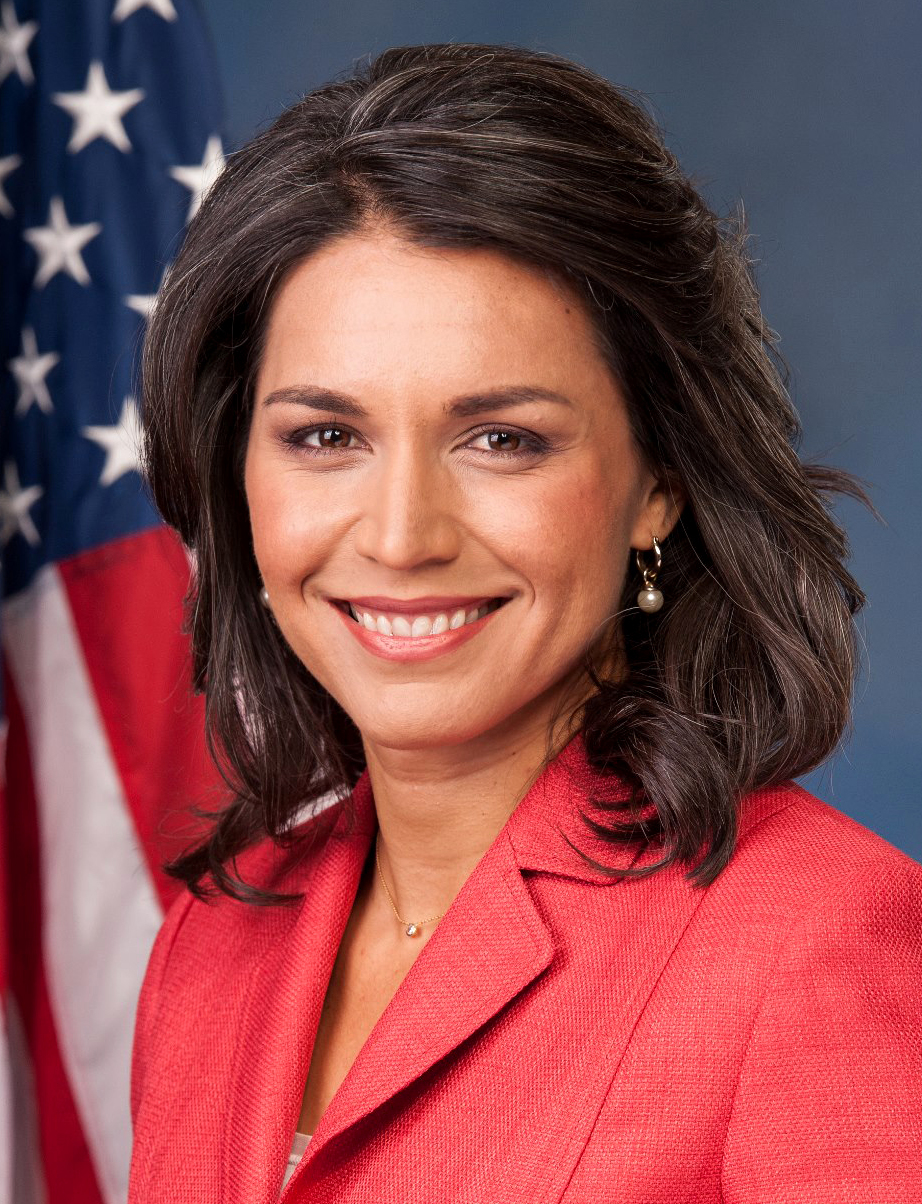

Nominee	Tulsi Gabbard	Kawika Crowley
Party	Democratic	Republican
Popular vote	142,010	33,630
Percentage	78.7%	18.6%
- Precinct results Gabbard: 50–60% 60–70% 70–80% 80–90% >90% No votes
U.S. Representative before election
Tulsi Gabbard
Democratic
Elected U.S. Representative
Tulsi Gabbard
Democratic

The 2nd district encompasses the rest of the island of Oahu, including the Windward, North Shore, Central and Leeward regions, as well as the entire state outside of Oahu. This includes the areas located in the counties of Kauaʻi (which includes the islands of Kauaʻi, Niʻihau, Lehua and Kaʻula), Maui (which consists of the islands of Maui, Kahoolawe, Lānai, Molokai except for a portion of Molokai that comprises Kalawao County and Molokini) and Hawaii County coextensive with the Island of Hawaii, often called "the Big Island". The incumbent was Democrat Tulsi Gabbard, who had represented the district since 2013. She was elected with 77% of the vote in 2012. The district had a PVI of D+21.

=== Democratic primary ===
==== Candidates ====
===== Nominee =====
- Tulsi Gabbard, incumbent U.S. representative

==== Results ====
Democratic primary results
Party	Candidate	Votes	%
Democratic	Tulsi Gabbard (incumbent)	92,032	100.0
Total votes		92,032	100.0

=== Republican primary ===
==== Candidates ====
===== Nominee =====
- Kawika Crowley, homeless handyman and nominee for this seat in 2012

===== Eliminated in primary =====
- Marissa D. Capelouto

==== Results ====
Republican primary results
Party	Candidate	Votes	%
Republican	Kawika Crowley	9,094	56.8
Republican	Marissa D. Capelouto	6,926	43.2
Total votes		16,020	100.0

=== Libertarian primary ===
==== Candidates ====
===== Nominee =====
- Joe Kent

==== Results ====
Libertarian primary results
Party	Candidate	Votes	%
Libertarian	Joe Kent	373	100.0
Total votes		373	100.0

=== General election ===
==== Polling ====
Poll source	Date(s) administered	Sample size	Margin of error	Tulsi Gabbard (D)	Kawika Crowley (R)	Undecided
New York Times/CBS News Battleground Tracker	October 16–23, 2014	444	± 9.0%	72%	14%	15%
Civil Beat	October 16–19, 2014	517	± 4.3%	69%	19%	12%
Civil Beat	September 11–14, 2014	504	± 4.4%	70%	17%	13%

==== Predictions ====
Source	Ranking	As of
The Cook Political Report	Safe D	November 3, 2014
Rothenberg	Safe D	October 24, 2014
Sabato's Crystal Ball	Safe D	October 30, 2014
RCP	Safe D	November 2, 2014
Daily Kos Elections	Safe D	November 4, 2014

==== Results ====
Hawaii's 2nd congressional district, 2014
Party	Candidate	Votes	%
Democratic	Tulsi Gabbard (incumbent)	142,010	78.7
Republican	Kawika Crowley	33,630	18.6
Libertarian	Joe Kent	4,693	2.6
Total votes		180,333	100.0
Democratic hold			

== See also ==
- 2014 United States House of Representatives elections
- United States Senate special election in Hawaii, 2014
- 2014 Hawaii gubernatorial election
- 2014 United States elections
