= 2010 Hawaii's 1st congressional district special election =

- May 22, 2010
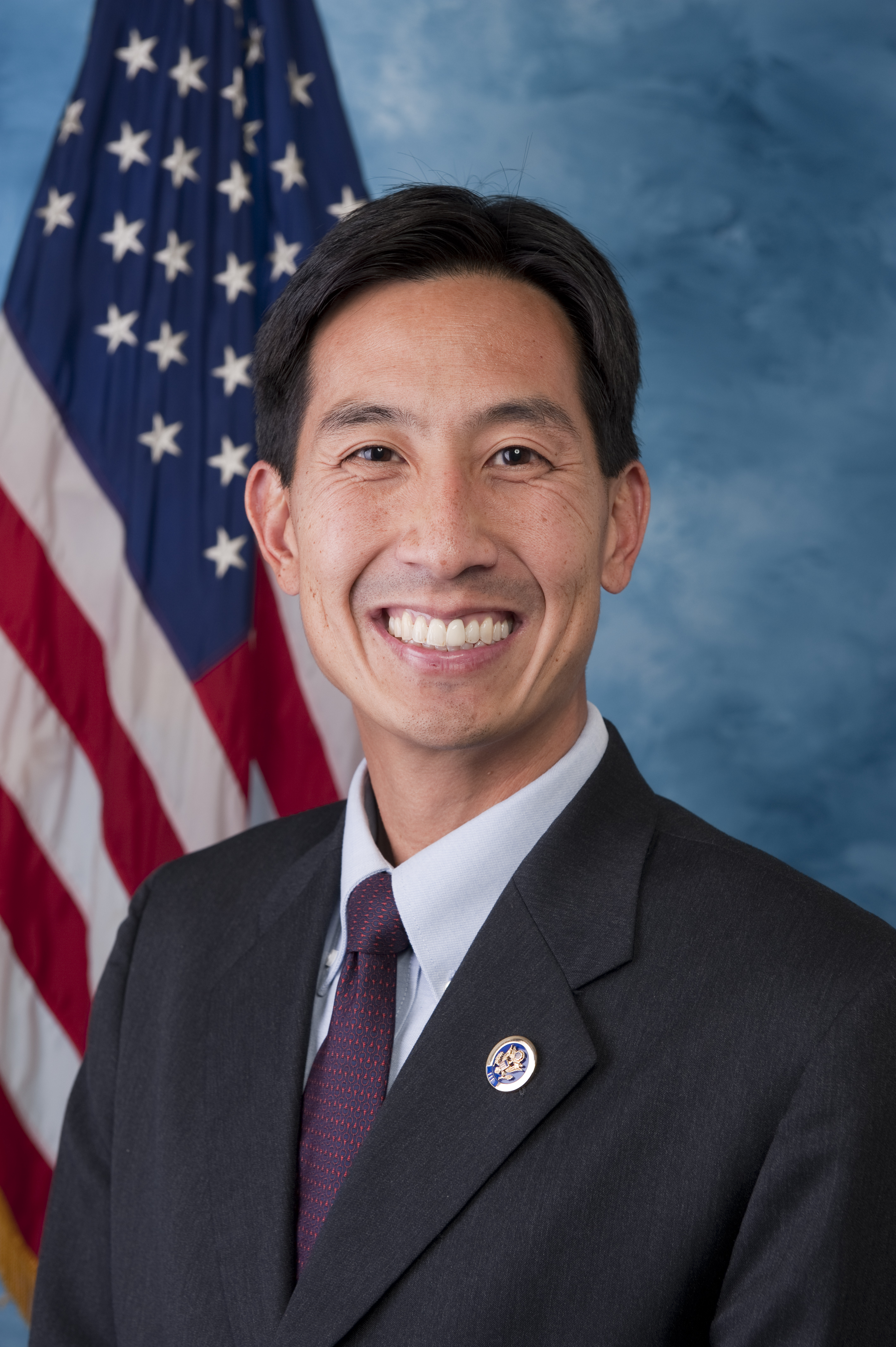

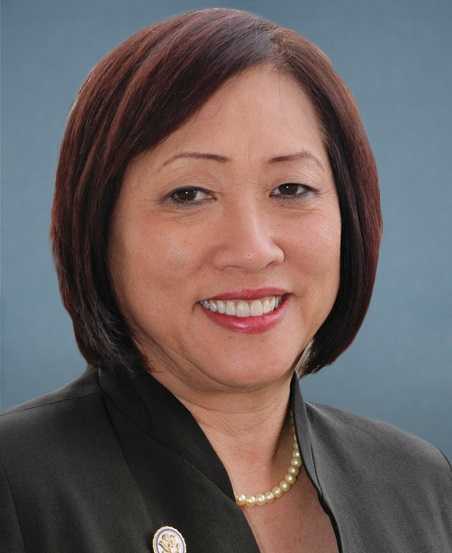

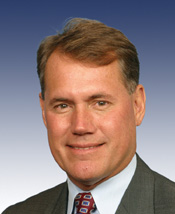
Candidate	Charles Djou	Colleen Hanabusa	Ed Case
Party	Republican	Democratic	Democratic
Popular vote	67,610	52,802	47,391
Percentage	39.68%	30.99%	27.81%
- Precinct results Djou: 30–40% 40–50% 50–60% Hanabusa: 30–40% 40–50% Case: 30–40% 40–50% Interactive map version
Representative before election
Neil Abercrombie
Democratic
Elected Representative
Charles Djou
Republican

The 2010 special election for the 1st congressional district of Hawaii was a special election to the United States House of Representatives that took place to fill the vacancy caused by Representative Neil Abercrombie's resignation on February 28, 2010, to focus on his campaign for governor of Hawaii in the 2010 gubernatorial election. Abercrombie planned not to run for re-election in 2010, and many of the candidates that were running for his open seat transferred to the special election. The election was held on May 22, 2010, and Republican Charles Djou won, defeating five Democrats, four fellow Republicans, and four Independent candidates. The main reason for his win was that there were two prominent Democratic candidates instead of one, which split the votes, allowing Djou to win, as Hawaii is an overwhelmingly Democratic state. This is to date the only time a Republican was elected to Congress from Hawaii since Pat Saiki in 1988; Djou volunteered on Saiki's 1988 campaign, and Saiki served as Djou's campaign chair in 2010.

== Special election rules ==
The election was held without a primary, meaning all candidates from all parties ran against one another and the person with the most votes (even if only a plurality) won; there was no runoff. With three top-tier candidates running, two Democrats and one Republican, it was considered likely that the two Democrats would split the vote, leading to a Republican victory.

This was conducted as a vote-by-mail election. All registered voters as of the voter registration deadline were automatically mailed a packet containing the vote-by-mail ballot and return envelopes. No polling places were open on May 22, 2010. Ballots were mailed approximately 20 days prior to the election. Voted ballots had to be received by the State of Hawaii Office of Elections no later than 6:00 p.m., May 22, 2010, in the return envelopes provided.

Any voter requiring the use of an accessible voting machine could do so at the Office of the City Clerk, Honolulu Hale, 530 S. King St. from Monday, May 10, 2010, to Thursday, May 20, 2010, excluding Sundays and holidays between the hours of 8:00 a.m. to 4:00 p.m. Walk-in voting was open on Saturdays during this period.

== Candidates ==
=== Democrats ===
- Vinny Browne
- Ed Case
- Del Castillo
- Colleen Hanabusa
- Philmund Lee

=== Republicans ===
- Charles Amsterdam
- Charles Collins
- Douglas Crum
- Charles Djou
- John Giuffre

=== No party affiliation ===
- Jim Brewer
- Karl F. Moseley
- Kalaeloa Strode
- Steve Tataii

(list of candidates appearing on the May 22, 2010 State of Hawaii, U.S. Representative District 1 Special Vacancy Election ballot)

== Campaign ==
Democratic leaders conceded that the winner-take-all primary favored the one lone Republican in the race. The Republican National Committee (RNC) indicated it might directly support Djou with the hope of winning a congressional seat in a historically Democratic state; RNC political director Gentry Collins referred to Scott Brown's victory in a Massachusetts special election for the U.S. Senate in stating: "I think for us to win that seat will send a signal that what happened in Massachusetts is not an isolated event."

Case and Hanabusa represented different wings of the party, Case being more of a blue-dog moderate Democrat, while Hanabusa was preferred by the liberal wing. Hanabusa secured the endorsement of EMILY's List, the local party establishment, and local labor unions. Case was at odds with the party establishment over his primary challenge to U.S. Senator Daniel Akaka in 2006 when he was still Representative of the 2nd district, although Case claimed that any bad blood with the Democratic electorate over the primary challenge was gone, according to his internal polling. Case also criticized Hanabusa for keeping her post as president of the State Senate while attempting to campaign, saying: "It is inconsistent for her to want to run the Senate in a time of crisis for our state and want to run a full-fledged congressional campaign." The national Democratic Party establishment and the Obama administration signaled Case was their pick, believing him more electable than Hanabusa. Case received support from the Democratic Congressional Campaign Committee while Hanabusa said she hadn't spoken to them since the previous year.

Both Case and Hanabusa proposed that the other drop out for the sake of party unity. The Democratic Congressional Campaign Committee (DCCC) dispatched an aide to the state in the hopes of at least ensuring no other Democrats enter the race. It was unlikely either Democrat would drop out; both represented different views and both already faced off in a 2002 special election for Hawaii's 2nd congressional district, which Case won. The DCCC chairman Congressman Chris Van Hollen said he was counting on Abercrombie to help keep the seat Democratic, indicating that endorsements would be used to show which Democrat was preferred by the national party. On May 10, 2010, the DCCC said it would not spend any further resources on the race, preferring to save those resources for the November election.

== Endorsements ==
Ed Case

Organizations

- Ocean Champions
- Sierra Club Hawai'i

Newspapers

- The Honolulu Advertiser
- Honolulu Star-Bulletin
Charles Djou

Individuals

- Tim Pawlenty, 38th governor of Minnesota (2003-2011)
- Mitt Romney, 70th governor of Massachusetts (2003-2007), Republican candidate for president in 2008

Organizations

- GOProud
Colleen Hanabusa

U.S. senators

- Daniel Akaka, U.S. senator from Hawaii (1990-2013)
- Daniel Inouye, U.S. senator from Hawaii (1963-2012)

U.S. representatives

- Madeleine Bordallo, U.S. delegate from Guam's at-large congressional district (2003-2019)
- Mike Honda, U.S. representative from California's 15th congressional district (2001-2013)
- Lynn Woolsey, U.S. representative from California's 6th congressional district (1993-2013)

Organizations

- EMILY's List
- Sierra Club Hawai'i

== Polling ==
Poll source	Date(s) administered	Sample size	Margin of error	Ed Case (D)	Charles Djou (R)	Colleen Hanabusa (D)	Other	Undecided
Merriman River Group	May 6–7, 2010	1,081	±3.0	25.5%	39.5%	25.5%	—	10%
Harstad Strategic Research	April 24–26, 2010	506	n/a	34%	36%	20%	—	—
Honolulu Advertiser	April 23–28, 2010	349	±5.2%	28%	36%	22%	—	13%
Daily Kos/Research 2000	April 11–14, 2010	500	±4.5%	29%	32%	28%	4%	7%
DCCC internal poll	April, 2010	n/a	n/a	32%	32%	27%	—	9%
Honolulu Star-Bulletin/Mason-Dixon	January 8–12, 2010	403	±5%	37%	17%	25%	—	21%

== Results ==
2010 Hawaii's 1st congressional district special election
Party	Candidate	Votes	%	±%
Republican	Charles Djou	67,610	39.68%	
Democratic	Colleen Hanabusa	52,802	30.99%	
Democratic	Ed Case	47,391	27.81%	
Democratic	Rafael Del Castillo	664	0.39%	
Independent	Kalaeloa Strode	491	0.29%	
Independent	Jim Brewer	273	0.16%	
Democratic	Philmund Lee	254	0.15%	
Republican	Charles (Googie) Collins	194	0.11%	
Republican	Charles Kaui Jochanan Amsterdam	170	0.10%	
Democratic	Vinny Browne	150	0.09%	
Independent	Steve Tataii	125	0.07%	
Republican	Douglas Crum	107	0.06%	
Republican	John (Raghu) Giuffre	82	0.05%	
Independent	Karl F. Moseley	80	0.05%	
Blank votes		135		
Over votes		889		
Majority		14,808	8.69%	
Turnout		170,393		
Republican gain from Democratic		Swing		
