= 2012 United States House of Representatives elections in Hawaii =

- November 6, 2012

All 2 Hawaii seats to the United States House of Representatives
	Majority party	Minority party
Party	Democratic	Republican
Last election	2	0
Seats won	2	0
Seat change	Steady	Steady
Popular vote	285,008	137,531
Percentage	67.45%	32.55%
Swing	▲4.57%	▼3.31%

Democratic
50–60%
60–70%
80–90%

The 2012 United States House of Representatives elections in Hawaii were held on Tuesday, November 6, 2012, to elect the two U.S. representatives from the state, one from each of the state's two congressional districts. The elections coincided with the elections of other federal and state offices, including a quadrennial presidential election and an election for the United States Senate. Primary elections were held on August 11, 2012.

== Overview ==
United States House of Representatives elections in Hawaii, 2012
Party	Votes	Percentage	Seats before	Seats after	+/–
Democratic	285,008	67.45	2	2	±0
Republican	137,531	32.55	0	0	±0
Totals	422,539	100.00%	2	2	±0

== District 1 ==
United States House of Representatives District 1
- November 6, 2012
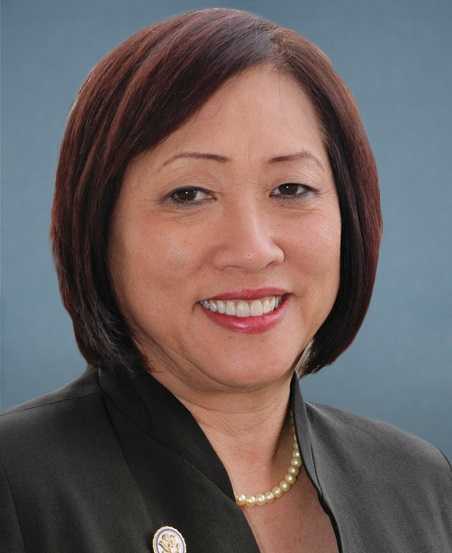

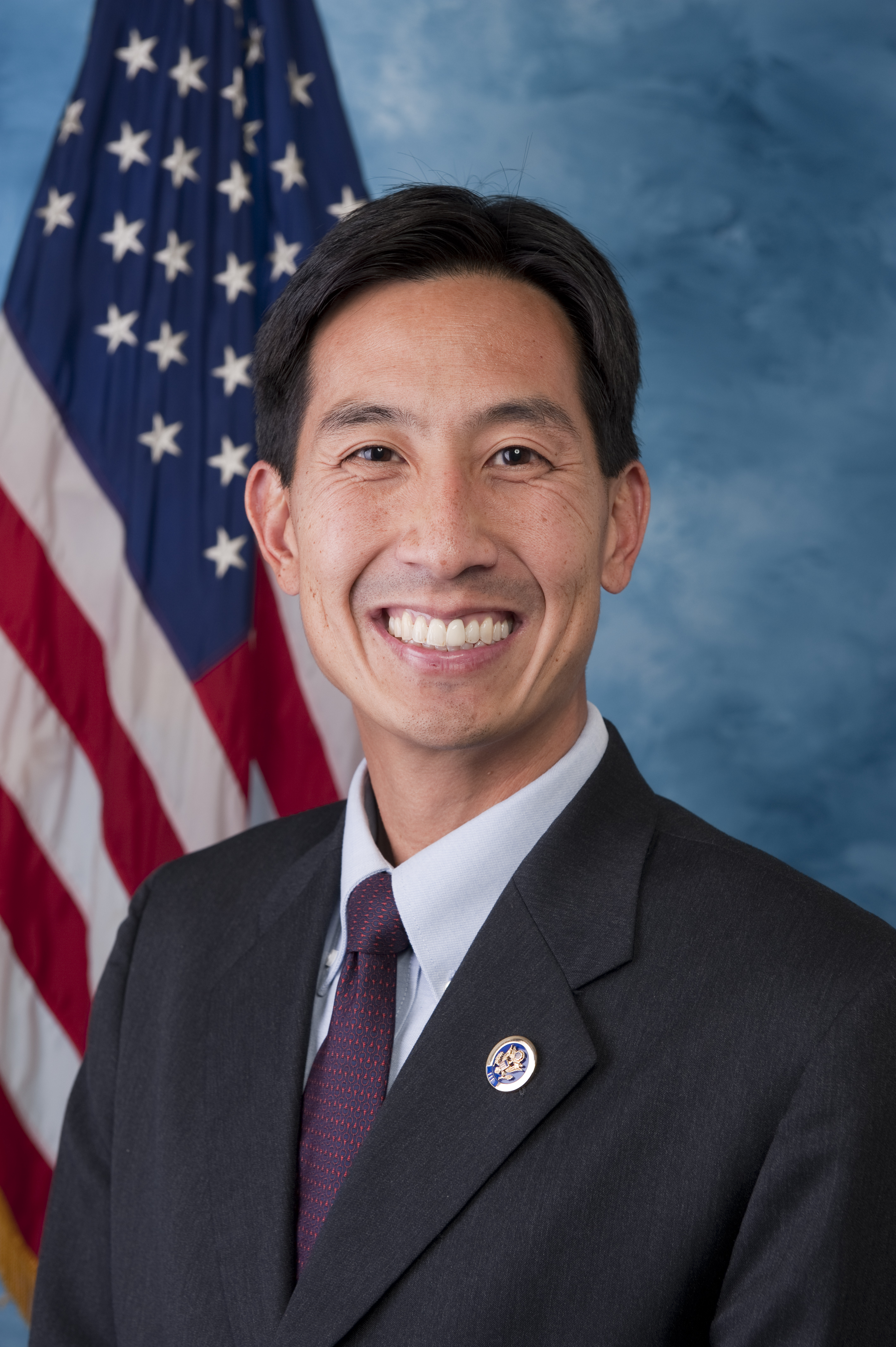
Nominee	Colleen Hanabusa	Charles Djou
Party	Democratic	Republican
Popular vote	114,756	95,431
Percentage	54.6%	45.4%
- Precinct results Hanabusa: 50–60% 60–70% Djou: 50–60% 60–70% No votes
U.S. Representative before election
Colleen Hanabusa
Democratic
Elected U.S. Representative
Colleen Hanabusa
Democratic

Democrat Colleen Hanabusa, who was first elected to represent the 1st district in 2010, ran for re-election.

=== Democratic primary ===
==== Candidates ====
===== Nominee =====
- Colleen Hanabusa, incumbent U.S. representative

===== Eliminated in primary =====
- Roy Wyttenbach II

==== Primary results ====
Democratic primary results
Party	Candidate	Votes	%
Democratic	Colleen Hanabusa (incumbent)	92,136	84.1
Democratic	Roy Wyttenbach II	17,369	15.9
Total votes		109,505	100.0

=== Republican primary ===
Former U.S. Representative Charles Djou, who represented the 1st district from May 2010 until January 2011, sought and received the Republican nomination to challenge Hanabusa again. He defeated C. Kaui Amsterdam and John Giuffre in the Republican primary.

==== Candidates ====
===== Nominee =====
- Charles Djou, former U.S. representative

===== Eliminated in primary =====
- C. Kaui Amsterdam
- John Giuffre

==== Primary results ====
Republican primary results
Party	Candidate	Votes	%
Republican	Charles Djou	25,984	95.7
Republican	C. Kaui Amsterdam	799	2.9
Republican	John Giuffre	376	1.4
Total votes		27,159	100.0

=== General election ===
==== Endorsements ====
Colleen Hanabusa (D)

Organizations

- Sierra Club
Charles Djou (R)

Organizations

- National Republican Congressional Committee "Contender" Program

==== Predictions ====
Source	Ranking	As of
The Cook Political Report	Safe D	November 5, 2012
Rothenberg	Safe D	November 2, 2012
Roll Call	Safe D	November 4, 2012
Sabato's Crystal Ball	Safe D	November 5, 2012
NY Times	Safe D	November 4, 2012
RCP	Safe D	November 4, 2012
The Hill	Safe D	November 4, 2012

==== Results ====
Hawaii's 1st congressional district, 2012
Party	Candidate	Votes	%
Democratic	Colleen Hanabusa (incumbent)	116,505	54.6
Republican	Charles Djou	96,824	45.4
Total votes		213,329	100.0
Democratic hold			

== District 2 ==
United States House of Representatives District 2
- November 6, 2012
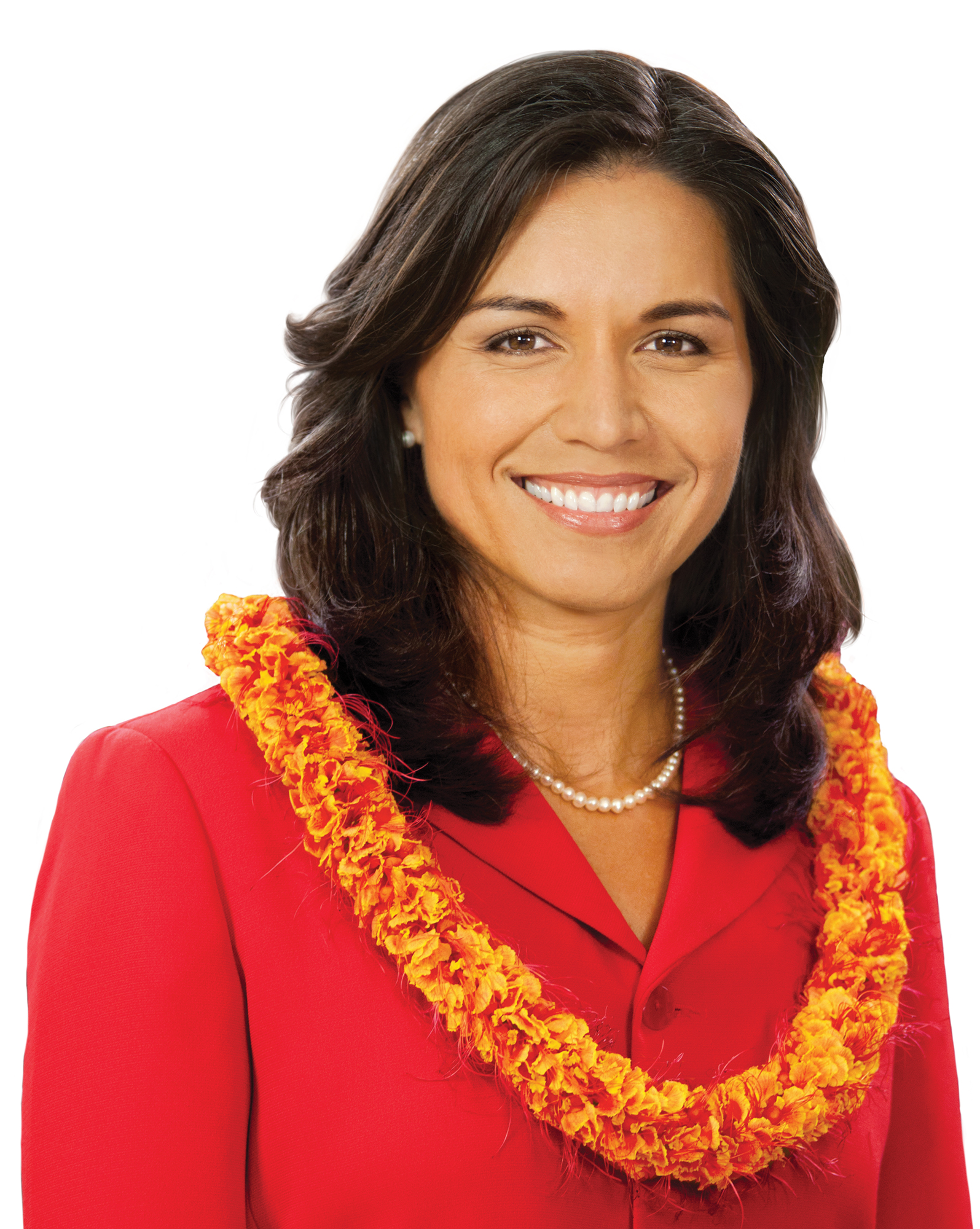

Nominee	Tulsi Gabbard	Kawika Crowley
Party	Democratic	Republican
Popular vote	167,085	40,285
Percentage	80.6%	19.4%
- Precinct results Gabbard: 50–60% 60–70% 70–80% 80–90% >90% No votes
U.S. Representative before election
Mazie Hirono
Democratic
Elected U.S. Representative
Tulsi Gabbard
Democratic

Democrat Mazie Hirono, who had represented the 2nd district since 2007, announced in May 2011 that she would run for the U.S. Senate rather than for re-election to the House.

=== Democratic primary ===
==== Candidates ====
===== Nominee =====
- Tulsi Gabbard, Honolulu City Councilmember

===== Eliminated in primary =====
- Rafael "Del" del Castillo, attorney and patients' rights advocate
- Mufi Hannemann, former mayor of Honolulu
- Esther Kia'aina, chief advocate for the Office of Hawaiian Affairs
- Bob Marx, attorney
- Miles Shiratori, financial advisor

===== Declined =====
- Tammy Duckworth, assistant secretary for Public and Intergovernmental Affairs in the U.S. Department of Veterans Affairs and unsuccessful candidate for the House of Representatives in Illinois in 2006
- Josh Green, state senator
- Clayton Hee, state senator
- Mazie Hirono, incumbent U.S. representative
- Gary Hooser, director of the state Office of Environmental Quality Control and former state senator

==== Campaign ====
Hannemann and Gabbard differed on the issue of same-sex marriage. Gabbard was opposed to the Defense of Marriage Act and to a proposed Hawaii state constitutional amendment that would define marriage as between a woman and a man, while Hannemann supported DOMA. Gabbard had previously opposed same-sex marriage, but during the primary campaign, promised to work to repeal DOMA and co-sponsor the Respect for Marriage act. Voters initially doubted the sincerity of her new views on the issue.

Gabbard filed a 270-page complaint against Hannemann's spending, saying that his campaign broke campaign finance laws by failing to report 2012 travel and polling expenses and improperly dealt with Hanneman's salary from a tourism association.

Candidates Marx, Gabbard, and Kia'aina debated on June 5, and Marx, Gabbard, Kia'aina and Hannemann debated in early July.

Gabbard's ratings in the polls increased steadily and Hannemann's dropped throughout the primary campaign; as of August 6, she was leading against Hanneman 49% to 29%.

==== Endorsements ====
Gabbard received endorsements from the Sierra Club, Women Under Forty PAC, Emily's List, VoteVets and MauiTime.

==== Primary results ====
On August 11, Gabbard defeated Hanneman by twenty points. The Honolulu Star-Advertiser described her win as the "improbable rise from a distant underdog to victory". Gabbard credited grassroots support as the reason for her come-from-behind win in the primary.

Democratic primary results
Party	Candidate	Votes	%
Democratic	Tulsi Gabbard	62,882	55.1
Democratic	Mufi Hannemann	39,176	34.3
Democratic	Esther Kia'aina	6,681	5.9
Democratic	Bob Marx	4,327	3.8
Democratic	Miles Shiratori	573	0.5
Democratic	Rafael del Castillo	520	0.4
Total votes		114,159	100.0

==== Aftermath ====
Gabbard decided to resign her seat on the City Council, stating that she wanted to prevent the cost of a separate special election, and resigned on August 16.

=== Republican primary ===
==== Candidates ====
===== Nominee =====
- Kawika Crowley, handyman

===== Eliminated in primary =====
- Matthew DiGeronimo, entrepreneur, motivational and business speaker, radio talk show host and former Navy officer

===== Declined =====
- Duke Aiona, former lieutenant governor of Hawaii
- Jonah Kaauwai, former chairman of the Hawaii Republican Party

==== Primary results ====
Republican primary results
Party	Candidate	Votes	%
Republican	Kawika Crowley	9,056	60.8
Republican	Matt DiGeronimo	5,843	39.2
Total votes		14,899	100.0

=== General election ===
==== Endorsements ====
Tulsi Gabbard (D)

Organizations

- Democratic Congressional Campaign Committee "Majority Makers" Program
- EMILY's List
- Sierra Club
- Veterans' Alliance for Security and Democracy
- VoteVets

==== Predictions ====
Source	Ranking	As of
The Cook Political Report	Safe D	November 5, 2012
Rothenberg	Safe D	November 2, 2012
Roll Call	Safe D	November 4, 2012
Sabato's Crystal Ball	Safe D	November 5, 2012
NY Times	Safe D	November 4, 2012
RCP	Safe D	November 4, 2012
The Hill	Safe D	November 4, 2012

==== Results ====
Hawaii's 2nd congressional district, 2012
Party	Candidate	Votes	%
Democratic	Tulsi Gabbard	168,503	80.5
Republican	Kawika Crowley	40,707	19.5
Total votes		209,210	100.0
Democratic hold			
