= Robert J. Dalessandro =

American historian and author

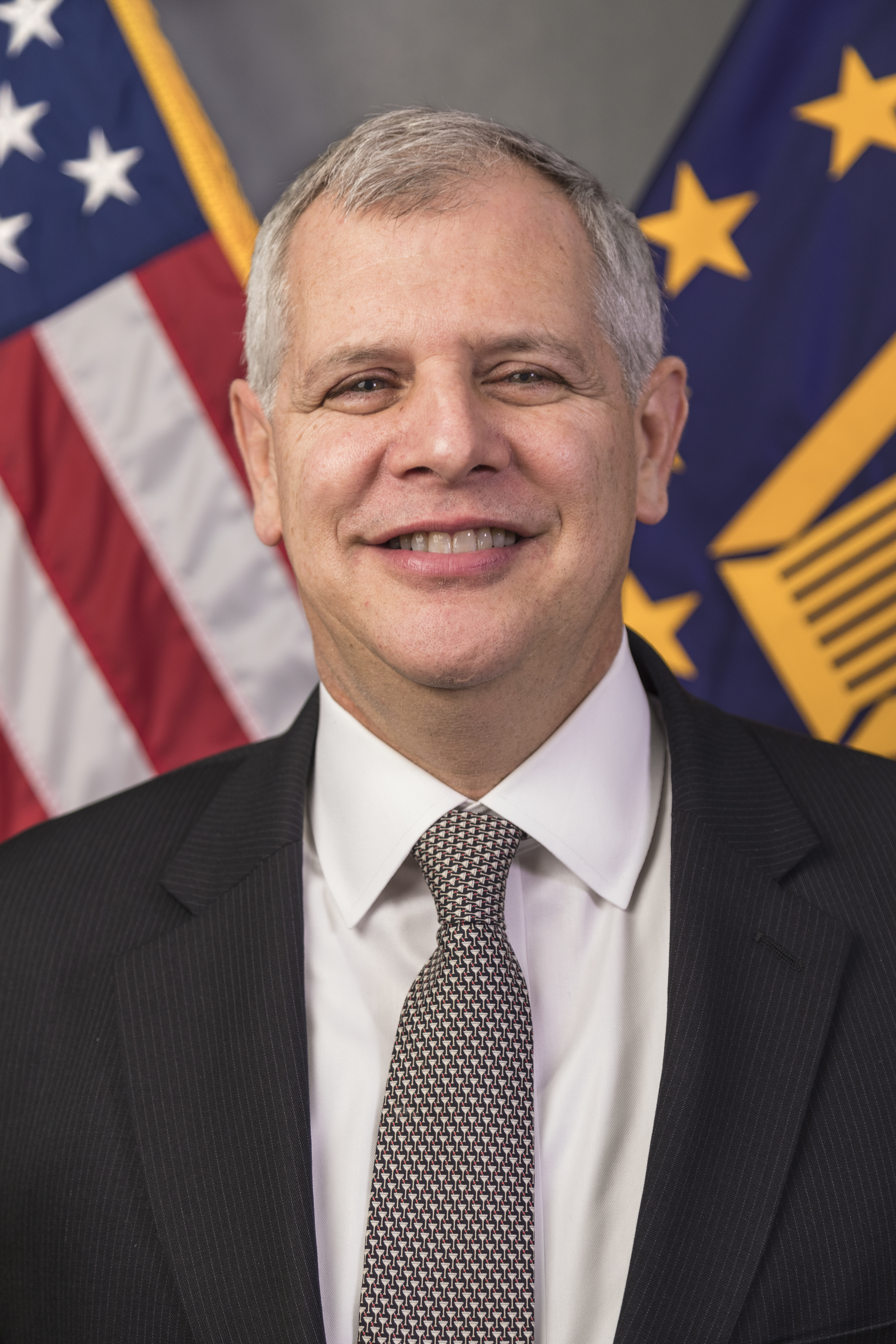
- Official portrait, 2018

Secretary of the American Battle Monuments Commission
- Acting
- Assumed office April 14, 2025
- President: Donald Trump
- Preceded by: Charles Djou

Personal details
- Born: 1958 New York City
- Profession: Military historian

Military service
- Branch/service: United States Army
- Rank: Colonel

Robert Joseph Dalessandro (born 1958) is an American historian and author who has written and presented extensively on the American Expeditionary Forces contributions to the First World War. He is the acting secretary of the American Battle Monuments Commission.

Dalessandro is a retired Colonel in the U.S. Army and the Deputy Secretary of the American Battle Monuments Commission, currently serving as the Acting Secretary. He is former Director of the United States Army Center of Military History at Fort Lesley J. McNair, Washington, D.C. Dalessandro frequently leads battlefield tours to sites in the United States, France and Italy.

== Education ==
Dalessandro graduated from the Virginia Military Institute with a degree in History in 1980. His graduate studies included work at the College of William and Mary, the U.S. Army War College and George Washington University.

== Military career ==
He has had a wide variety of Army leadership and staff assignments including time as a platoon leader, command at company, depot and battalion level and staff assignments at echelons of command ranging from battalion through Department of the Army level.

== Writing and political career ==
Dalessandro is widely published on the lifeways and material culture of the American Soldier in the eighteenth, nineteenth, and twentieth centuries. He is co-author of the Organization and Insignia of the American Expeditionary Forces, 1917–1923, he serves as editor of the Army Officer’s Guide, co-author of Willing Patriots: Men of Color in the First World War, and American Lions: the 332nd Infantry Regiment in Italy in World War I.

His book, Organization and Insignia of the American Expeditionary Forces, 1917–1923 received the Army Historical Foundation award for excellence in writing.

Dalessandro is the former Chairman of the United States World War One Centennial Commission. He assumed those duties following the untimely death of former Congressman Ike Skelton. He was appointed to the commission in 2014.

After Charles Djou's departure in 2025, Dalessandro became the acting secretary of the American Battle Monuments Commission.

== Published works ==
- Organization and Insignia of the American Expeditionary Force, 1917–1923, Atglen, PA: Schiffer Publishing, 2008 ISBN 0-764-32937-5 OCLC 233482816
- The Army Officer's Guide, Mechanicsburg, PA: Stackpole, 2009, 2013, 2016
- Willing Patriots: Men of Color in the First World War, Atglen, PA: Schiffer Publishing, 2009, ISBN 9780764332333
- American Lions: The 332nd Infantry Regiment in Italy in World War I, Atglen, PA: Schiffer Publishing, 2010, ISBN 9780764335181
- 100 Greatest Military Photographs, Atlanta, GA: Whitman Publishing, 2013, ISBN 9780794837730
- The Great War, A World War I Historical Collection, Atlanta, GA: Whitman Publishing, 2013, ISBN 9780794837402
- with Rebecca S. Dalessandro, Over There: America in the Great War, Mechanicsburg, PA: Stackpole, 2015, ISBN 9780811714853
- with Edwin L. Fountain, Editors, "World War I Remembered", Fort Washington, PA: Eastern National, 2017, ISBN 9781590911907
- Editor "World War I Battlefield Companion", Washington, DC: American Battle Monuments Commission, 2018, ISBN 978-0-16-094781-0
- Editor "American Armies and Battlefields in Europe: World War II" American Battle Monuments Commission, 2019
