= Ocean Champions =

U.S. environmental organization

- Official Logo
- Formation: 2003
- Headquarters: Capitola, California
- Location(s): Capitola and Washington, D.C.

Ocean Champions, a 501(c)(4) environmental organization in the United States with a connected political action committee (Ocean Champions PAC), is the first national organization of its kind focused solely on oceans and ocean wildlife.

Their goal is to create a political environment where protecting and restoring the oceans is a national government priority.

They do this by helping to elect pro-ocean Congressional candidates and working to defeat the others. Ocean Champions engages with members of Congress to pass pro-ocean laws and shoot down bills that would harm the ocean. Co-founder David Wilmot defines the organization as a "blue group", instead of a "green group" to emphasize its focus on the oceans. In 2016, for the first time in the history of the Peter Benchley Ocean Awards, an organization received Excellence in Policy Award. Ocean Champions and its Co-Founder, David Wilmot, Ph.D., were named that year's awardee.

== Organization ==
Ocean Champions was founded by marine biologist, David Wilmot and environmental attorney Jack Sterne in 2003. Currently (2011), David Wilmot is the group’s President and the Executive Director is Mike Dunmyer. The group is headquartered on the west coast in Capitola, California, and has since added an office on the east coast in Delaware.

On Earth Day 2011, Ocean Champions was recognized as a certified Monterey Bay Area Green Business.

== Political action ==
Some of the issues that Ocean Champions has lobbied in Congress include: harmful algal blooms, ending over-fishing, national ocean policy (OCEANS-21), national endowment for the oceans, offshore oil drilling, water pollution prevention and ocean acidification.

Ocean Champions has supported over 50 Congressmen/women since the 109th United States Congress election in 2004. Ocean Champions works with both Democrats and Republicans.

Ocean Champions supported Rep. Farr and worked to defeat re-election of Representative Richard Pombo in 2006.

From 2004 to 2014, Ocean Champions has had an 86% success rate of endorsed candidates winning their respective elections. In 2014 Ocean Champions defeated Ocean Enemy #1 Steve Southerland and support 68 champions serving in the 114th Congress.

=== Ocean topics ===
Though young, Ocean Champions has already achieved several legislative victories, and that influence continues to grow. Ocean Champions was a major player in the re-authorization of a stronger Magnuson-Stevens Fisheries Management Law, and helped defeat a farm bill amendment that would have exacerbated over-fishing.

Key Champions in Congress helped protect the moratorium on new oil drilling off our coasts in 2006 and 2007 and led the efforts in holding BP accountable in 2010.

Ocean Champions played a key role in obtaining the President’s Executive Order for a National Ocean Policy. Also in 2010, the organization led the charge on a House bill to reduce toxic algae blooms and ocean dead zones that passed the House, but just missed passing the Senate. This bill enjoys bipartisan support and has good prospects in 2011.

In the 112th Congress, Ocean Champions are focusing on a number of ecosystem issues, including ending over-fishing, reducing coastal water pollution and protecting coral reefs, such as through the introduction of The National Endowment for the Oceans, Coasts, and Great Lakes Act. This proposal is meant to preserve the ecosystems that coastal communities and economies depend on.
