= Charles Djou =

American politician (born 1970)

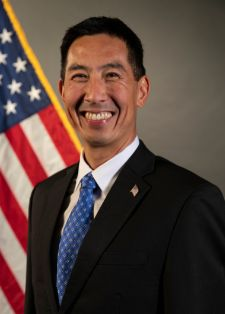
- Official portrait, 2022

Secretary of the American Battle Monuments Commission
- In office May 2022 – April 14, 2025
- President: Joe Biden; Donald Trump
- Preceded by: William Matz
- Succeeded by: Robert J. Dalessandro (acting)

Member of the U.S. House of Representatives from Hawaii's 1st district
- In office May 22, 2010 – January 3, 2011 (Note: Djou's official service begins on the date of the special election, while he was not sworn in until May 25, 2010.)
- Preceded by: Neil Abercrombie
- Succeeded by: Colleen Hanabusa

Member of the Honolulu City Council from the 4th district
- In office December 2002 – May 22, 2010
- Preceded by: Duke Bainum
- Succeeded by: Lee Donohue

Member of the Hawaii House of Representatives from the 47th district
- In office January 1999 – December 2002
- Preceded by: Iris Catalani
- Succeeded by: Colleen Meyer

Personal details
- Born: Charles Kong Djou; August 9, 1970 (age 56) Los Angeles, California, U.S.
- Party: Republican (before 2018); Independent Democrat (2018–present)
- Spouse: Stacey Kawasaki
- Children: 3
- Education: University of Pennsylvania (BS, BA); University of Southern California (JD); United States Army War College (MA)

Military service
- Branch/service: United States Army
- Rank: Colonel
- Unit: United States Army Reserve

Chinese name
- Chinese: 周永康
Transcriptions
Standard Mandarin
- Hanyu Pinyin: Zhōu Yǒngkāng
Yue: Cantonese
- Jyutping: Zau1 Wing5 Hong1

Charles Kong Djou (born August 9, 1970) is an American politician and attorney who served as secretary and chief executive of the American Battle Monuments Commission. A former member of the Republican Party, Djou briefly served as U.S. representative from Hawaii's 1st congressional district from May 2010 to January 2011. As of 2026, he is the last Republican to represent Hawaii in Congress.

Djou was elected to Congress in a May 2010 special election with 39.68% of the vote against two Democratic opponents. He was defeated in the November 2010 general election by Colleen Hanabusa. His election made him the first Thai American, as well as the first Republican of Chinese American descent, to serve in the House of Representatives. Prior to his election to Congress, he was a member of the Hawaii House of Representatives and the Honolulu City Council.

Following his defeat in 2010, he unsuccessfully ran to represent the district again in the 2012 and 2014 elections. In 2016, he was a candidate for Mayor of Honolulu, ultimately losing to Kirk Caldwell by a 52% to 48% margin. In 2018, Djou left the Republican Party due to his opposition to then-President Donald Trump. Djou supported Democratic nominee Joe Biden's candidacy in the 2020 presidential election. Following Biden's victory, Djou was appointed Secretary of the American Battle Monuments Commission.

== Early life and education ==
Djou was born on August 9, 1970 in Los Angeles, California to a Chinese father from Shanghai and a Thai Chinese mother from Bangkok. His paternal grandfather fled Shanghai following the Communist revolution, settling in British Hong Kong.

Djou grew up in Hawaii after his father's employer transferred him there when Djou was three. He graduated from high school at Punahou School, and earned a Bachelor of Arts in political science and a Bachelor of Science in economics from the Wharton School of the University of Pennsylvania, graduating magna cum laude. He earned his J.D. degree at the USC Gould School of Law at the University of Southern California. Djou earned his M.A. graduate degree in strategic studies at the US Army War College where he was a resident student and Carlisle Scholar.

Djou is a colonel in the United States Army Reserve. He has taught as an adjunct professor of law at the University of Hawaii and as an adjunct professor of political science at Hawaii Pacific University.

=== Early political career ===
Djou was Vice Chairman of the Hawaii Republican Party from 1998 to 1999 and was later named legislator of the year by Small Business Hawaii in 2002, 2004, and 2006. In 2006 he was selected as one of the 40 most promising leaders in Hawaii under age 40 by Pacific Business News, and in 2005 was named by Honolulu Weekly as the "Best Politician" in the state.

=== Hawaii House of Representatives (1999–2002) ===
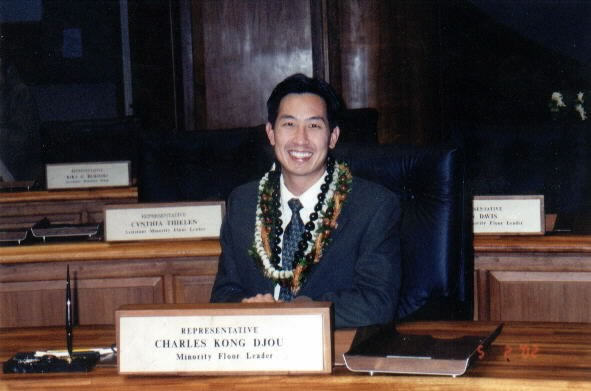
Djou in 2002 as the GOP State House Floor Leader

==== Elections ====
In 1998, Djou ran as a Republican for the Hawaii State House of Representatives District 47 seat. He was unopposed in the primary election, but lost to Iris Ikeda Catalani in the general election by 190 votes.

In 2000, he again ran for the Hawaii State House of Representatives District 47 seat. Unopposed in the primary, he faced Catalani in the general election. Catalani faced controversy in the campaign, with allegations that she broke a promise to the Outdoor Circle, a community beautification organization, by posting yard signs. Djou won the race with 52.5 percent of the vote to Catalani's 44.2 percent.

=== Tenure ===
As a member of the State House of Representatives, Djou had one term in the Hawaii House of Representatives from 2000 to 2002 and was the Minority Floor Leader. Djou launched a successful campaign to open the State Budget worksheets to the public after being told he could look at the budget worksheets in the committee room but was not allowed to take any notes or make copies of them. The documents detail the budget for various state departments and agencies. He opposed the state "van cam" program launched in 2002 to catch speeders using automated cameras instead of police officers, and successfully campaigned for its elimination.

=== Honolulu City Council (2002–2010) ===
==== Elections ====
In 2002, Djou announced he would run for the Honolulu City Council. He also announced he would move to East Honolulu (City Council District IV) from Kaneohe (City Council District III) to avoid running against fellow Republican Stan Koki. Honolulu City and County elections are officially nonpartisan, and any candidate who wins a majority of the votes in the primary election can win outright. No candidate received a majority of the votes in the primary election, so Djou and Robert Fishman, a former city managing director and chief of staff to the governor, faced each other in a runoff in the general election. Djou won with 51.3 percent of the vote to Fishman's 39.2 percent.

Djou ran for reelection to the Honolulu City Council. He was unopposed and won the seat by default.

==== Tenure ====
In 2002, Djou was elected to the Honolulu City Council, representing District IV (Waikiki to Hawaii Kai). He was reelected in 2006 and was on the council until his election to Congress. On the City Council he was the Chairman of the Zoning Committee, Vice Chair of the Planning Committee and as a member of the Transportation and Public Safety & Services committees.

== U.S. House of Representatives ==
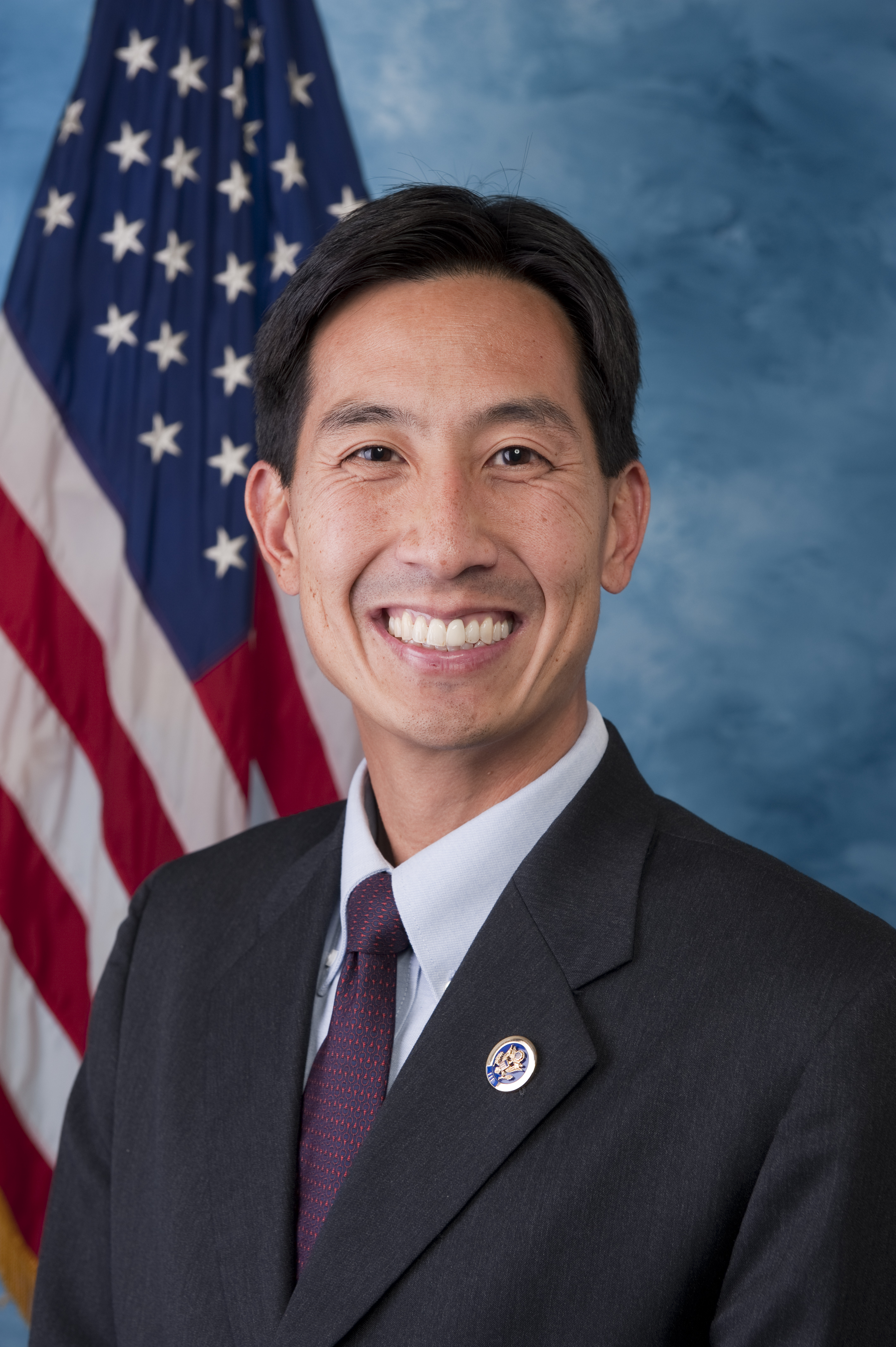
Djou's official congressional portrait, 111th Congress

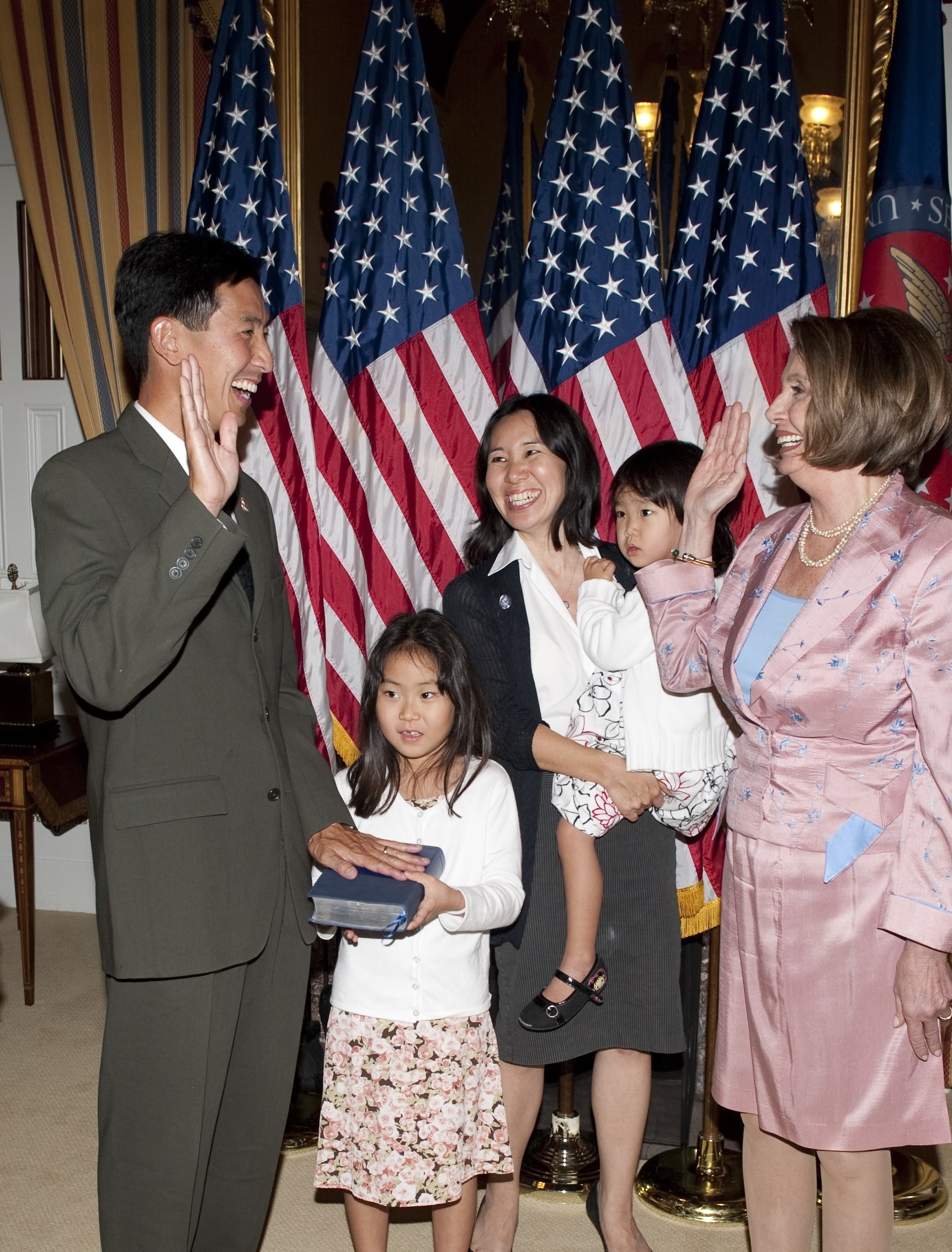
Rep.Charles K. Djou (R-Hawaii), with his wife and daughters, being sworn in by US House Speaker Nancy Pelosi.

=== Elections ===
==== 2010 special ====
In March 2008, Djou announced well ahead of time that he would run for U.S. Congress in the 2010 cycle, seeking Hawaii's 1st congressional district seat. The seat became vacant on February 28, 2010, when incumbent Neil Abercrombie resigned to run for Governor of Hawaii. Abercrombie's resignation precipitated a special election on May 22, 2010, which Djou entered. Djou was endorsed by former Massachusetts Governor and Presidential candidate Mitt Romney. Djou subsequently endorsed Romney for president in the summer of 2011. Former Hawaii Congresswoman Patricia Saiki, a Republican for whom Djou had once volunteered as a teenager, was Djou's honorary campaign chair.

In the special election, Djou received 39.4 percent of the vote. He defeated five Democrats, four Republicans, and four independent candidates. Among the candidates Djou defeated were former Congressman Ed Case and State Senator Colleen Hanabusa, two Democrats who together polled over 58% of the vote. Djou was sworn in three days later and was in office for the remainder of Abercrombie's 2010 term, serving from May 2010 to January 2011. He was the first Republican to represent the district in 20 years. He followed Abercrombie and Patsy Mink as the third person to have been in the Honolulu City Council, Hawaii State Legislature and U.S. Congress, and was the first to be elected to all three chambers before age 40.

=== Tenure ===
==== Committee assignments ====
- Committee on Armed Services
  - Subcommittee on Readiness
  - Subcommittee on Terrorism and Unconventional Threats
- Committee on the Budget

==== LGBT rights ====
Djou had opposed Hawaii House Bill 444 in 2009, a bill to legalize civil unions for same-sex and opposite-sex couples, and supported the federal Defense of Marriage Act. He stated that lawmakers "ignored the will of the people" who enacted Hawaii Constitutional Amendment 2 in 1998.

Djou was one of a handful of Congressional Republicans who voted in favor of an amendment to the 2011 Department of Defense Authorization Bill that would repeal the "Don't ask, don't tell" law and allow gay people to serve in the U.S. military.

==== Immigration ====
Djou supported comprehensive immigration reform and was one of eight Republicans who voted for the DREAM Act to allow immigrants brought to the U.S. as children earn citizenship through service in the military or obtaining a college education and a job.

==== South Korean Free Trade Agreement ====
On May 28, 2010, Djou spoke on the floor of the House in support of approving the South Korean Free Trade Agreement, which was signed by former president George W. Bush on June 30, 2007. Congress approved the agreement on October 11, 2011.

==== 2010 general ====
Djou ran for a full term in November 2010. There was some controversy over the use of robocalling by the Congressman's official U.S. House office, both before the election and afterward, but as with all official mass communication between members of the House and their constituents, the phone survey conducted on behalf of Djou's office was approved by the bipartisan Franking Commission as an appropriate use of official resources for the purpose of communicating with constituents.

Djou was defeated by the Democratic nominee, State Senate President Colleen Hanabusa, 53% to 47%. Djou was one of only two Republican incumbents to lose a general election in 2010, along with Joseph Cao in Louisiana.

== Post-congressional tenure ==
=== Later candidacies for Congress ===
==== 2012 ====
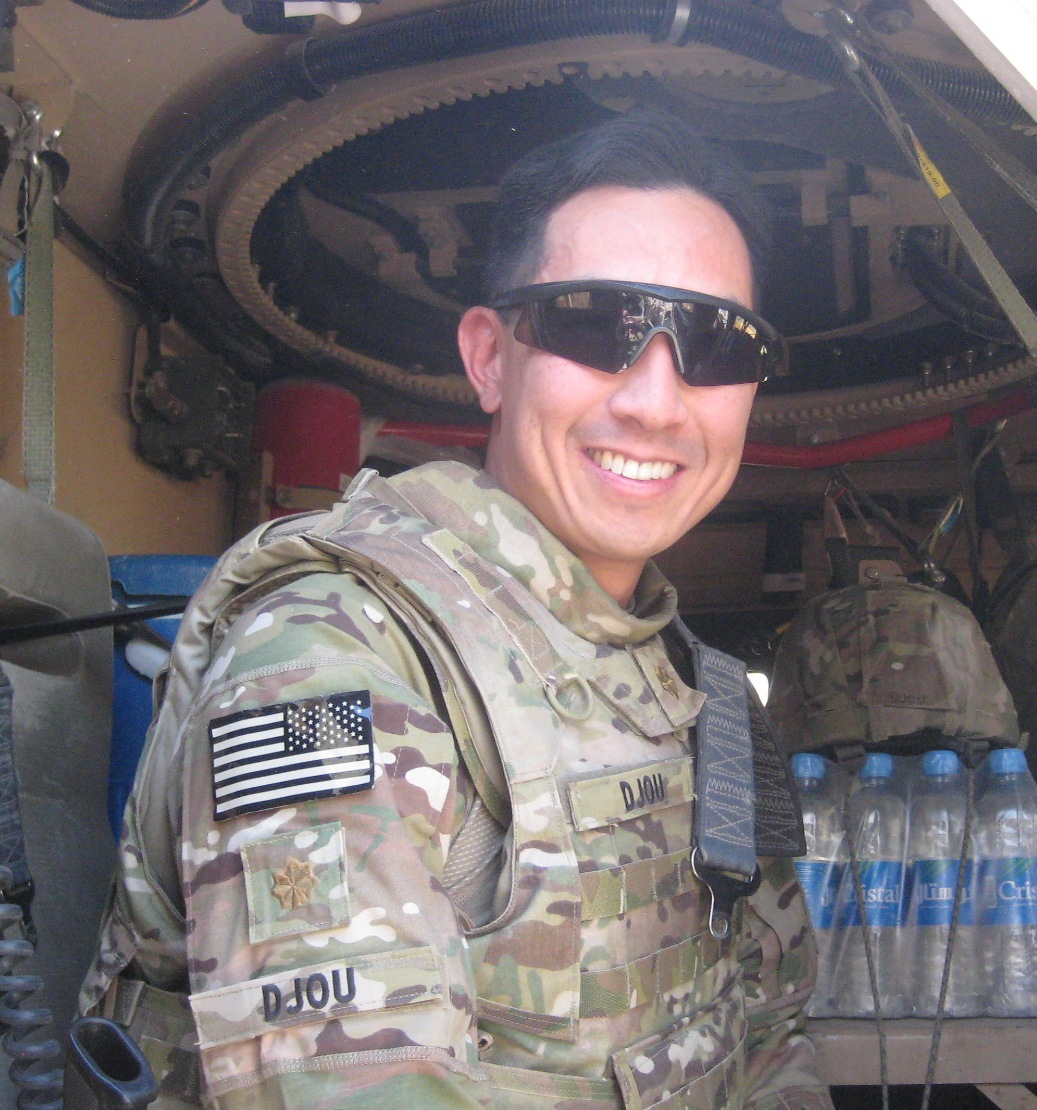
Djou serving with the 10th Mountain Division in Kandahar, Afghanistan in 2011

Djou announced on August 17, 2011, that he would challenge Hanabusa in the 1st district in 2012. A major in the U.S. Army Reserve, Djou suspended his campaign for six months while deployed to Afghanistan with the 3rd Brigade Combat Team, 10th Mountain Division, from September 2011 to March 2012. Djou lost to Hanabusa in the general election, with 45.4% of the vote.

==== 2014 ====
Djou ran for the 1st district again in 2014. Although he garnered a greater percentage of the vote in a general election than any other Republican running for Congress in Hawaii since 1988, he still narrowly lost to Democratic state representative Mark Takai, who received 51.2% of the vote.

=== 2016 Honolulu mayoral election ===
Djou announced on June 7, 2016 that he was running for the nonpartisan office of Mayor of Honolulu against incumbent Mayor Kirk Caldwell, former Mayor Peter Carlisle, and at least ten others. In the nonpartisan race, Djou had already received the endorsement of former governor Ben Cayetano, an anti-rail Democrat. On June 15, Djou announced that retired Federal Judge and former Chair of the Democratic Party of Hawaii, Walter Heen, would chair Djou's campaign, and City Council member Ann Kobayashi, also a Democrat, supported Djou for mayor. With no candidate receiving more than 50% of the vote on August 13, 2016, a decision between the top two candidates, Djou and Caldwell, would be made in the November 8, 2016 election.

Caldwell defeated Djou, 52% to 48%. Though both candidates supported the municipal rail project, its cost overruns were an issue, as well as Caldwell's alleged interference with the Ethics Commission. Labor group support was split between the pair.

=== Later career ===
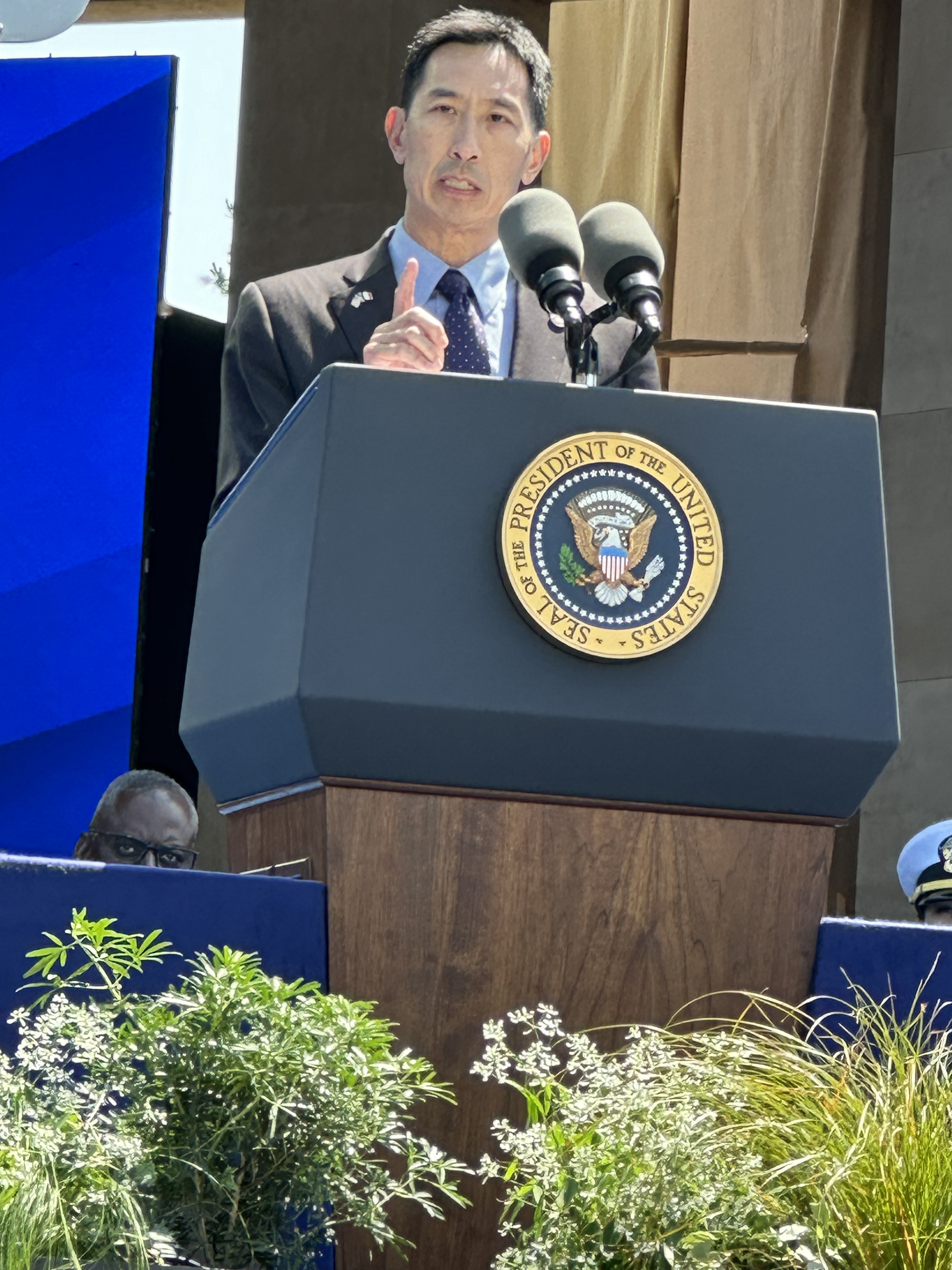
Djou introducing Pres.Biden at the 80th Anniversary of DDay in Normandy, France in 2024

Djou served as the Hawaii state campaign chair of John Kasich's 2016 presidential campaign and urged voters before the 2016 Hawaii caucuses to reject Donald Trump. In 2018, Djou left the Republican Party, citing concerns with its policies and President Trump's character. In October 2019, Djou said, "It would be fair to say that I'm an independent Democratic [sic]". On July 9, 2020, Republican Voters Against Trump released a video in which Djou urged voters to vote against Trump.

Djou is a member of the ReFormers Caucus of Issue One.

On March 9, 2020, Djou published an op-ed article in Honolulu Civil Beat announcing that he would not enter the 2020 Honolulu mayoral election, though he has accused Honolulu politicians of incompetence in handling important issues. Djou wrote, "while it is clear to all that Honolulu is in desperate need of dramatic change and real leadership, I have come to the difficult decision that I am not the best person to lead this charge in the 2020 election." He later supported Rick Blangiardi who won the Honolulu mayoral election.

In addition to his decision not to run for mayor of Honolulu, Djou announced he was selected to serve in the United States Army War College to complete a graduate degree in Strategic Studies. With his decision to set politics aside, Djou wrote, "completing War College will better position me to assume more significant future roles and duties in service to our country. And unfortunately, running for public office this fall would conflict with this military assignment."

In 2020, Djou endorsed Democrat Joe Biden for President alongside 26 other former Republican members of Congress. In May 2022, President Biden appointed Djou to be secretary of the American Battle Monuments Commission. In August 2024, Djou wrote an op-ed for Fox News praising 2024 Democratic vice-presidential nominee Tim Walz. When President Trump succeeded Biden, Djou stepped down and was succeeded by ABMC deputy secretary Robert J. Dalessandro in an acting capacity.

After his departure, Djou continued writing on public policy, particularly international affairs and national security. In a 2025 Washington Post commentary, he called for the US to lead reformation instead of withdrawing from UNESCO, based on his experiences as ABMC Secretary.

=== Margraten cemetery controversy ===
In November 2025, Dutch media reported that two informational panels about Black American soldiers had been removed from the visitor center at the Netherlands American Cemetery in Margraten. The panels, installed in 2024, described the contributions of Black American soldiers during World War II and the racial discrimination they faced both in the military and at home. One panel told the story of George H. Pruitt, a 23-year-old Black soldier buried at the cemetery who died attempting to rescue a comrade in 1945; the other explained U.S. military segregation policies during the war.

The American Battle Monuments Commission (ABMC) initially stated the panels were part of a routine rotation. However, in December 2025, internal emails obtained by the Jewish Telegraphic Agency through a Freedom of Information Act request revealed that Djou, while serving as ABMC secretary, had ordered the removal in March 2025.

According to the emails, Djou acted on March 19, 2025, the day President Trump signed an executive order banning foreign-facing agencies from promoting what he called "discriminatory equity ideology." Although the ABMC was not specifically covered by the order, Djou emailed his staff under the subject line "Foreign DEI" asking whether any displays at overseas visitor centers might "get us in trouble." A senior staffer replied that he had already scrubbed the agency's website of potentially noncompliant material and warned that the Margraten panel was "a problem." Djou's deputy Robert J. Dalessandro wrote: "I agree on the Netherlands. That panel should go. Frankly, it never should have been there in the first place." Djou ordered the panel removed "to avoid raising any ire of the administration" and suggested keeping it in storage at least until "a new admin in 2029."

The removal sparked significant backlash in the Netherlands after it became public in November 2025. The provincial government of Limburg formally called on the U.S. ambassador to restore the panels, with eleven political parties in the provincial council issuing a joint statement calling the removal "indecent and unacceptable." A coalition of Dutch World War II museums and memorial centers, including the Anne Frank House, sent a letter to the U.S. ambassador urging intervention.

Ken Greenberg, national executive director of the Jewish War Veterans of the United States of America, said the decision "sets a dangerous precedent." "Removing history is wrong," he said. "Are you trying to erase what these Black service members did, or hide it, or banish it? That's just wrong." Janice Wiggins, the widow of Jefferson Wiggins, a Black soldier who helped dig graves at the cemetery and whose story was featured on one of the panels, told CNN the panels "were never intended to be part of a traveling exhibit or rotation" but "were intended to be a permanent part of the Visitors Center exhibits."

Djou, a Biden appointee, departed the ABMC shortly after the panels were removed. He told CNN the removal was "done via an internal agency review at the prompting of the Trump administration." He was succeeded by Dalessandro in an acting capacity.

In January 2026, the ABMC announced replacement panels that would not restore the original content. The new panels do not mention segregation, though they still note that Black Americans helped build the cemetery. ABMC executive director Thomas Spoehr stated that "a visitor center at a cemetery is not a general historical museum" and that discussing racism and segregation was "not part of our mission." Spoehr denied that Trump's anti-diversity policies had influenced the decision, calling it an internal decision by Djou.

== Personal life ==
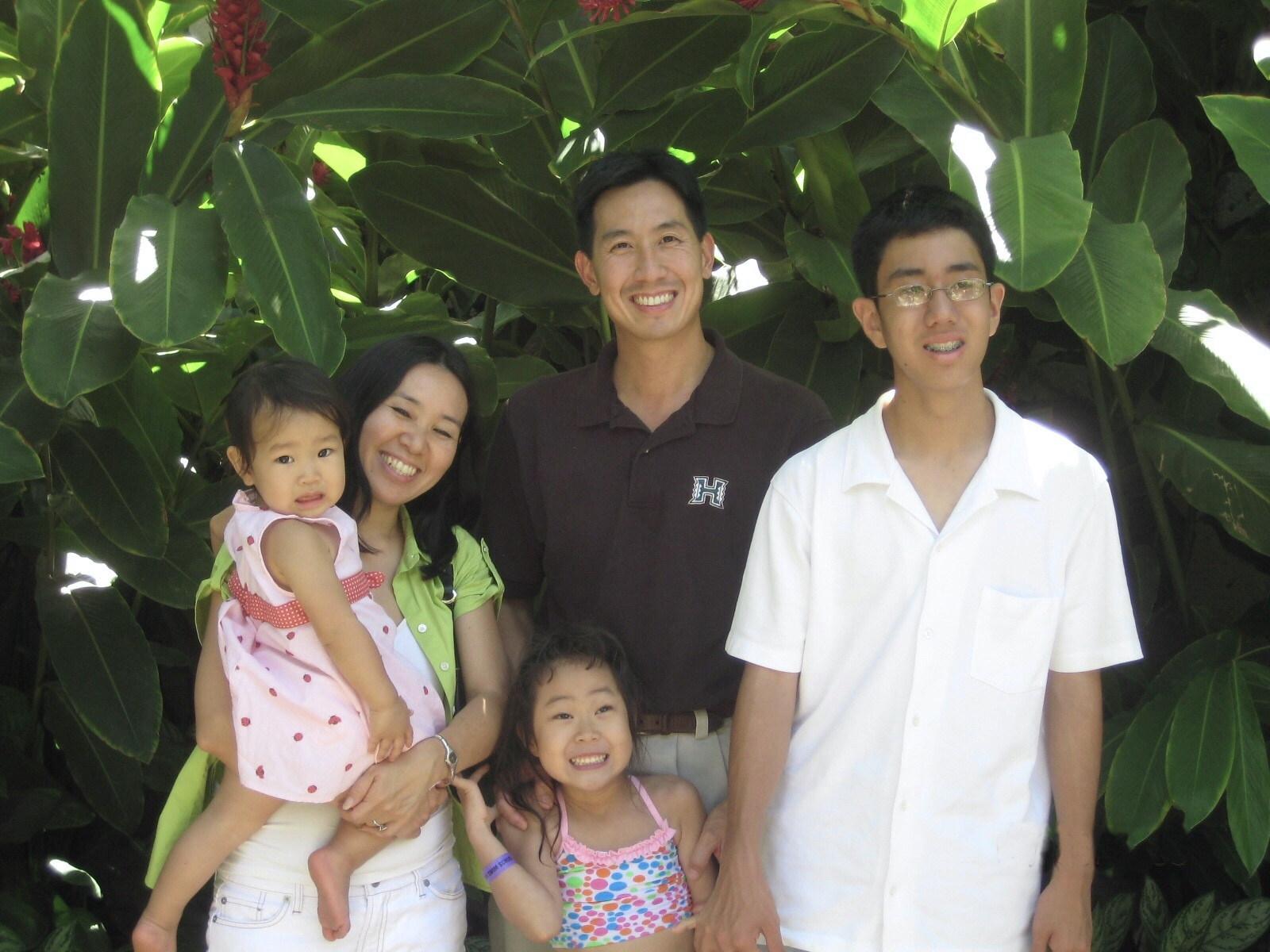
Charles Djou and family in 2008

Djou is married to Stacey Kawasaki Djou, a Japanese American. They have three children. His surname is a French transliteration of the Chinese surname Zhou. This originates from his grandfather's work at a French engineering company in Shanghai in the 1920s, where he was referred to as "Dijou", a name he later wrote on his immigration papers.

Djou was on the board of directors of the American Lung Association and a member of the Neighborhood Board. He is a member of the Young Business Roundtable, the Rotary Club, and the Hawaii Telecommunications Association. He is currently a member of the Goodwill Hawaii Contract Services Board.

Since 2010, Djou has contributed op-ed articles as a writer for Honolulu Civil Beat, a local nonprofit journalism website.

== See also ==
- List of Asian Americans and Pacific Islands Americans in the United States Congress

U.S. House of Representatives
Preceded by Neil Abercrombie	Member of the U.S. House of Representatives from Hawaii's 1st congressional district 2010–2011	Succeeded by Colleen Hanabusa
U.S. order of precedence (ceremonial)
Preceded by Bill Redmond as Former U.S. Representative	Order of precedence of the United States as Former U.S. Representative	Succeeded by Christopher Landau as U.S. Deputy Secretary of State
