= Mark Takai =

American politician (1967–2016)

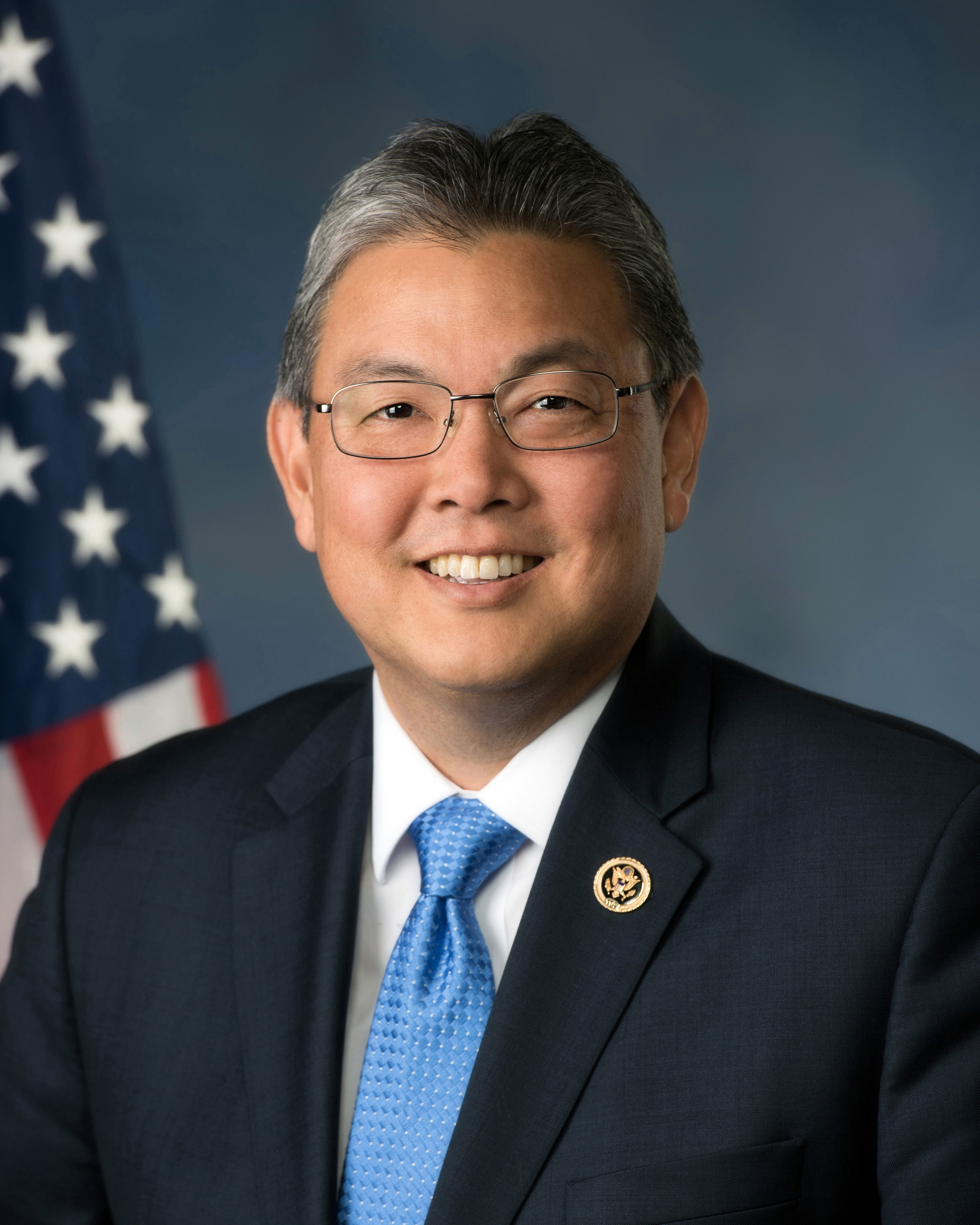
- Official portrait, 2016

Member of the U.S. House of Representatives from Hawaii's 1st district
- In office January 3, 2015 – July 20, 2016
- Preceded by: Colleen Hanabusa
- Succeeded by: Colleen Hanabusa

Member of the Hawaii House of Representatives from the 33rd district 34th (1994–2012)
- In office 1994–2014
- Preceded by: David Ige
- Succeeded by: Sam Kong

Personal details
- Born: Kyle Mark Takai; July 1, 1967 Honolulu, Hawaii, U.S.
- Died: July 20, 2016 (aged 49) Aiea, Hawaii, U.S.
- Resting place: National Memorial Cemetery of the Pacific
- Party: Democratic
- Spouse: Sami Takai
- Children: 2
- Education: University of Hawaii, Manoa (BA, MPH)

Military service
- Branch/service: United States Army
- Years of service: 1999–2016
- Rank: Lieutenant Colonel
- Unit: Hawaii Army National Guard; Charlie Company (Medical), 29th Brigade Support Battalion
- Battles/wars: Operation Iraqi Freedom
- Awards: Meritorious Service Medal; U.S. Army Distinguished Service Medal; Hawaii Distinguished Service Order

Kyle Mark Takai (July 1, 1967 – July 20, 2016) was an American politician and military officer who served as the U.S. representative for Hawaii's 1st congressional district from 2015 until his death in 2016. A member of the Democratic Party, he previously served in the Hawaii House of Representatives from 1994 to 2014.

A native of Honolulu, Hawaii, Takai last served in the Hawaii Army National Guard as a lieutenant colonel and took part in Operation Iraqi Freedom in 2009, concurrent with his political career. He was the Democratic nominee for the U.S. House in the 2014 elections, narrowly defeating former Republican Congressman Charles Djou to win the seat.

Takai announced in May 2016 that he would not seek reelection due to ill health; he died from pancreatic cancer two months later.

== Early life and education ==
Takai was born in Honolulu, Hawaii. He received his diploma from Pearl City High School in 1985, where he was a four-time high school swimming champion and a high school All-American swimmer. Takai received a Bachelor of Arts degree in political science and a Master of Public Health degree from the University of Hawaii at Manoa. At the university, Takai was a Western Athletic Conference champion swimmer, president of the Associated Students of the University of Hawaii, and editor-in-chief of the campus newspaper. He was a member of the 1998 class of the Pacific Century Fellows.

== Political career ==
Takai was first elected to the Hawaii House of Representatives in 1994, representing the 34th house district of Pearl City, near Pearl Harbor. He was reelected eight times before shifting to represent the 33rd house district of Aiea in 2012. Takai chaired the House Committee on Culture and the Arts from 1997 to 2000. He also served as vice chair of the House Committee on Higher Education (1995–2002) and as chair in 2003–2004. Additionally, he chaired the House Committee on Veterans, Military, & International Affairs, & Culture and the Arts. During the 2005 and 2006 sessions, Takai served as Vice Speaker of the House.

Takai left his 20-year tenure as a state representative to become the Democratic nominee for the United States House of Representatives for Hawaii's 1st congressional district in the 2014 elections, after incumbent Colleen Hanabusa's decision to run for the United States Senate. He won the election with 51.2% of the vote, defeating Republican nominee Charles Djou. In November 2015, he introduced the Atomic Veterans Healthcare Parity Act, extending federal compensation to those made sick by involvement in cleanup operations after bomb tests on Pacific islands.

=== Committee assignments ===
- Committee on Armed Services
  - Subcommittee on Tactical Air and Land Forces
  - Subcommittee on Strategic Forces
- Committee on Small Business
  - Subcommittee on Agriculture, Energy and Trade
  - Subcommittee on Contracting and Workforce (Ranking Member)

== Military service ==
Takai was commissioned as first lieutenant in the Hawaii Army National Guard (HIARNG) on July 19, 1999, and worked as the Preventive Medical Officer. He was the Division Chief for Soldiers Services and a School Liaison for the HIARNG. He later became a lieutenant colonel on May 14, 2013. Takai also served as the President of the Hawaii National Guard Association and the President of the National Guard Association-Hawaii Insurance, Inc.

Takai was called to active duty for six months (May to November 2005) and served as the Hawaii Army National Guard Deputy State Surgeon. He later served as the Company Commander of Charlie Company (Medical), 29th Brigade Support Battalion from November 2006 to May 2008. Takai was posted abroad during Operation Iraqi Freedom as the Base Operations Officer (Camp Mayor) at Camp Patriot, Kuwait, from February 2009 to September 2009.

Among his numerous awards and decorations, Takai received the Meritorious Service Medal from the United States Army in 2009, the Distinguished Service Medal from the National Guard Association of the United States in 2011, and the Hawaii Distinguished Service Order in 2012.

== Illness and death ==
Takai was diagnosed with a small tumor on his pancreas in late October 2015. On May 19, 2016, he announced that he would not seek reelection because his cancer had spread, but vowed to serve the remaining eight months of his term. He died two months later at his home in Aiea. He was 49. He was survived by his wife, Sami, and their two children.

In 2018, Takai was posthumously inducted into the Hawaii Swimming Hall of Fame.

== See also ==
- List of Asian Americans and Pacific Islands Americans in the United States Congress
- List of members of the United States Congress who died in office (2000–present)#2010s

U.S. House of Representatives
Preceded by Colleen Hanabusa	Member of the U.S. House of Representatives from Hawaii's 1st congressional district 2015–2016	Succeeded by Colleen Hanabusa
