= Kawika Crowley =

Hawaiian politician

Personal details
- Born: David P. Crowley; 1952 Japan
- Died: January 4, 2023 (aged 71) Pu’ueo Bridge, Hilo, Hawaii, U.S.
- Cause of death: Suicide by jumping
- Party: Republican
- Spouse: Unknown (divorced)
- Children: 3
- Website: www.kawika4congress.com

David P. "Kawika" Crowley (1952 – January 4, 2023) was a Hawaiian politician who was the Republican nominee for the United States House of Representatives from Hawaii's 2nd congressional district in the November 2012 election. A colorful and offbeat candidate, he achieved notability as the "homeless handyman" running for Congress. He was the first homeless person in Hawaii – and perhaps any state – to be nominated for Congress on a major party ticket. In 2014, Crowley again won the Republican primary race for the 2nd Congressional district in a contested race.

== Early years ==
By some accounts Crowley was born in Japan as the son of missionaries; by other accounts he was born in North Carolina and moved to Japan with his parents when he was six months old. He grew up speaking and reading Japanese. When he was in 8th grade, he moved to Hilo, Hawaii and learned for the first time to read English. Crowley spent his teenage years and much of his young adulthood in Hilo. He graduated from Hilo High School in 1969. He described himself as a "college dropout with a degree in common sense."

== Political life ==
Crowley ran for Mayor of the Big Island of Hawaii in 1990. In 2012, Crowley defeated Matthew DiGeronimo to win the Republican nomination for Hawaii's 2nd Congressional district race. Crowley achieved 45% of the vote to his opponent's 29%. In the general election, Crowley was easily beaten by Tulsi Gabbard, who became the first Hindu Member of Congress.

For six years, Crowley represented interests of the Hawaii Bar Owners Association, doing lobbyist work at the Hawaii State House. He was known as "the smoking guy" for his lobbying to repeal Hawaii's ban on indoor smoking in stand alone bars, and was never seen without a cigar. He was opposed to the Honolulu Rail Project and to same-sex marriage. He was a supporter of the Hawaiian sovereignty movement, although he had no Hawaiian ancestry.

=== Electoral history ===
2012 U.S. House of Representatives Hawaii District 2 Republican primary
Party	Candidate	Votes	%
Republican	Kawika Crowley	9,056	45.0
Republican	Matt DiGeronimo	5,843	29.0
	Blank Votes	5,232	26.0
	Over Votes	10	0.0
Total votes		20,141	100

2012 U.S. House of Representatives Hawaii District 2
Party	Candidate	Votes	%
Democratic	Tulsi Gabbard	168,503	76.8
Republican	Kawika Crowley	40,707	18.6
	Blank Votes	9,952	4.5
	Over Votes	121	0.1
Total votes		219,283	100

2014 U.S. House of Representatives Hawaii District 2 Republican primary
Party	Candidate	Votes	%
Republican	Kawika Crowley	9,094	42.71
Republican	Marissa D. Capelouto	6,926	32.53
	Blank votes	5,255	24.68
	Over votes	15	0.07
Total votes		21,290	100

2014 U.S. House of Representatives Hawaii District 2
Party	Candidate	Votes	%
Democratic	Tulsi Gabbard (Incumbent)	142,010	78.7%
Republican	Kawika Crowley	33,630	18.6%
Libertarian	Joe Kent	4,693	2.6%
Total votes		180,333	100

== Personal life and death ==
Divorced with three children, Crowley lived as a single parent for several years. He was a handyman and painter living in his car. He earned about $15,000 a year, putting him among the working homeless.

He claimed to be a co-writer of the song Hawaiʻi '78 and to have had a history in the Hawaiian Music industry.

Crowley committed suicide by jumping off Pu’ueo Bridge in downtown Hilo, on January 4, 2023.
