= Colleen Hanabusa =

American politician (1951–2026)

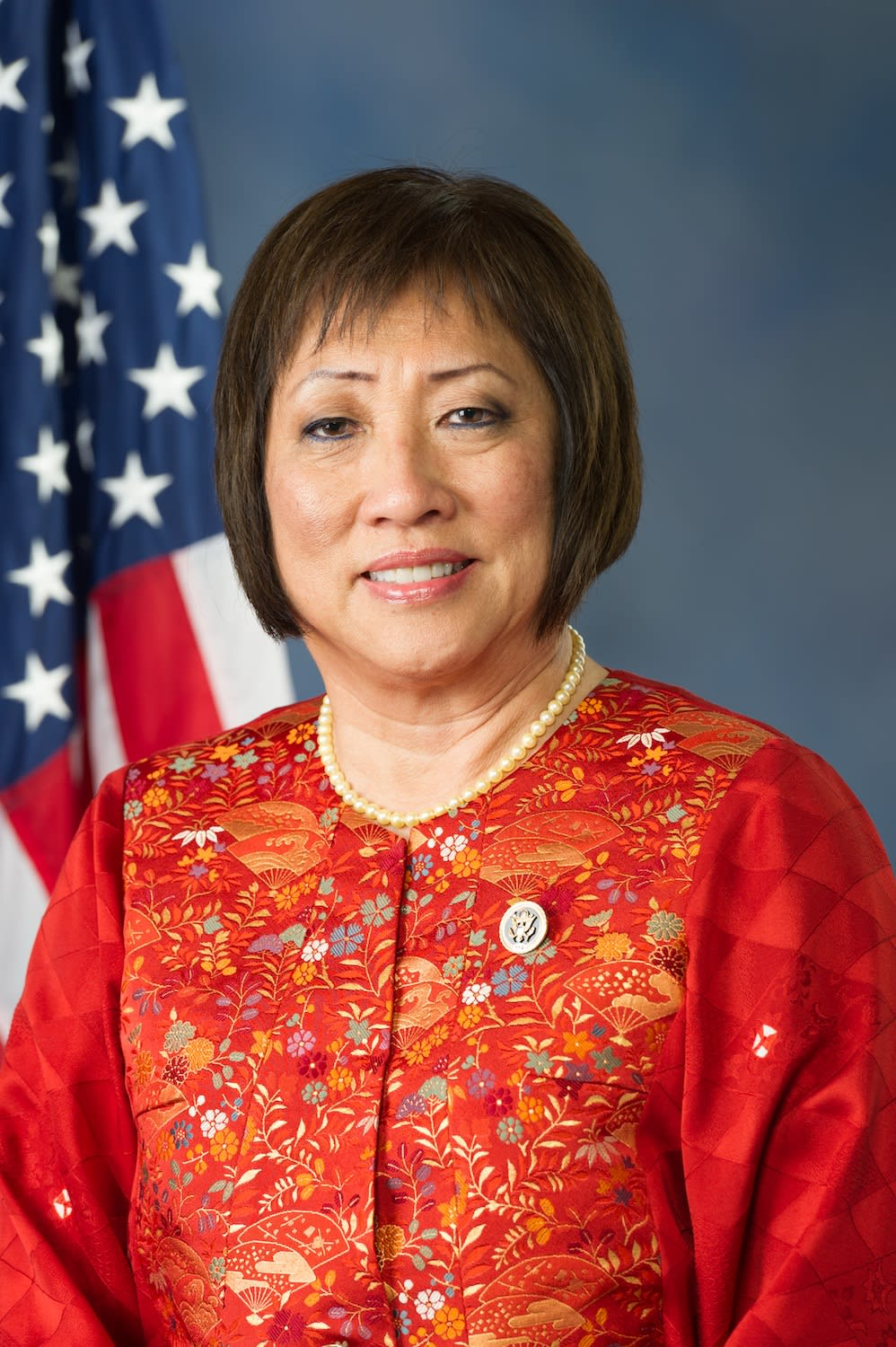
- Official portrait, 2017

Member of the U.S. House of Representatives from Hawaii's 1st district
- In office November 8, 2016 – January 3, 2019 (Note: Hanabusa's official service begins on the date of the special election, while she was not sworn in until November 14, 2016.)
- Preceded by: Mark Takai
- Succeeded by: Ed Case
- In office January 3, 2011 – January 3, 2015
- Preceded by: Charles Djou
- Succeeded by: Mark Takai

11th President of the Hawaii Senate
- In office January 2, 2009 – November 6, 2010
- Preceded by: Robert Bunda
- Succeeded by: Shan Tsutsui

Member of the Hawaii Senate from the 21st district
- In office January 20, 1999 – November 6, 2010
- Preceded by: James Aki
- Succeeded by: Maile Shimabukuro

Personal details
- Born: Colleen Wakako Hanabusa; May 4, 1951 Honolulu, Hawaii, U.S.
- Died: March 6, 2026 (aged 74) Honolulu, Hawaii, U.S.
- Party: Democratic
- Spouse: John Souza (m. 2008)
- Education: University of Hawaii, Manoa (BA, MA, JD)

Colleen Wakako Hanabusa (May 4, 1951 – March 6, 2026) was an American lawyer and politician who served as the U.S. representative for Hawaii's 1st congressional district from 2011 to 2015 and again from 2016 to 2019. A member of the Democratic Party, she ran for her party's nomination for governor of Hawaii in 2018, challenging and losing to incumbent and fellow Democrat David Ige.

Before her election to the United States House of Representatives, Hanabusa was a member of the Hawaii Senate. She served as Senate Majority Leader before being elected Hawaii's first female President of the Senate in 2007. On August 24, 2011, she announced her intention to run for election to Congress. On December 17, 2012, after the death of U.S. Senator Daniel Inouye, it was announced that Inouye had sent a letter shortly before his death to Governor Neil Abercrombie, stating his desire that Hanabusa be appointed to the seat. Abercrombie decided against appointing Hanabusa and selected Lieutenant Governor Brian Schatz instead. Hanabusa challenged Schatz in the Democratic primary for the 2014 special election, but narrowly lost.

In 2016, Hanabusa announced her intention to run in the 1st congressional district special election to fill the remaining term of Representative Mark Takai, who died in July 2016; she won the Democratic primary for the race on August 13. On November 8, 2016, Hanabusa won the special election for the remainder of Takai's term and also won election to a full term; although her seniority resumed immediately, she needed to be sworn in to perform congressional duties, and she took the oath on November 14. In 2017, Hanabusa announced her decision to run for the governorship of Hawaii in 2018 rather than reelection to the U.S. House of Representatives. She lost to incumbent Democratic governor David Ige in the primary, and Ige was reelected to a second term. In February 2020, Hanabusa announced her campaign for Mayor of Honolulu in 2020. She placed third in the nonpartisan blanket primary. Hanabusa's final role in public service was on the board of the Honolulu Authority for Rapid Transportation, from which she retired in 2025.

== Early life and education ==
A fourth-generation American of Japanese ancestry, Hanabusa was born on May 4, 1951, in Honolulu and grew up in Waiʻanae with her two younger brothers, her parents, and her grandparents. Her parents, Isao and June, owned a gas station. Her maternal grandfather was confined at the Honouliuli Internment Camp on Oahu during World War II. In 1969 she graduated from St. Andrew's Priory. She received a B.A. in economics and sociology in 1973 and an M.A. in sociology in 1975 from the University of Hawaiʻi and in 1977 received a J.D. from the William S. Richardson School of Law at the University of Hawaiʻi at Mānoa.

== Law career ==
Hanabusa was a labor lawyer with almost 30 years of experience, and a corporate officer in a family-run corporation. She was recognized in The Best Lawyers in America, Woodward and White, Inc.; served as a delegate to the Hawai`i State Judicial Conference; and was noted in Honolulu Magazine as one of Hawai`i's A+ Attorneys in 1993 and subsequent years.

== Hawaii Senate ==
In November 1998 Hanabusa was elected the state senator from the 21st District. The 21st District includes Wai'anae, where her family has resided for four generations, as well as Ko Olina, Kahe Point, Nanakuli, Ma'ili, Makaha, Makua, and Ka'ena Point.

One of Hanabusa's first acts upon being elected was to organize senators to vote against the second-term confirmation of Hawaii Attorney General Margery Bronster.

Hanabusa served as Senate Majority Leader before being elected the first woman president of the Senate in 2006, making her the first Asian American woman to preside over a state legislative chamber in the United States. In 2003 she was named one of Hawaii's "top ten political power brokers", along with the state's governor and two U.S. senators, by Hawaii Business Magazine.

Hanabusa ran unsuccessfully in a special election held in January 2003 to replace the late Patsy T. Mink as U.S. Representative from Hawai'i's 2nd congressional district, losing to Ed Case, a Blue Dog Democrat. In 2006 she ran for the same seat after Case decided not run for reelection to the house but rather to in the end unsuccessfully challenge Senator Daniel Akaka in the Democratic primary. Hanabusa was again unsuccessful, losing in the Democratic primary to former Lieutenant Governor Mazie Hirono by 844 votes.

=== Leadership positions ===
- Serving the Leeward Coast as state senator since 1998
- State senate president since 2007
- State senate majority leader since 2007
- Chair, Judiciary and Hawaiian Affairs Committee
- Co-chair, Joint Senate House Task Force on Ice and Drug Abatement
- Senate's first statewide hearings on Rice v. Cayetano
- United States Supreme Court decision co-chair, Joint Senate House Investigative Committee: Felix Consent Decree
- 2001 Vice chair, Senate Ways and Means Committee
- Vice president, state senate
- Chair, Senate Committee on Water, Land, and Hawaiian Affairs

=== Key legislation introduced ===
- 3 R's program for repair and maintenance of schools
- Repeal of the Van Cam Law
- Tax credit to enable construction and jobs at Ko Olina
- Bill to reform election contributions
- Bill to pay the awards of the Individual Rights Panel-DHHL
- Bill to require community notice prior to establishing a halfway house
- Bill for ceded land inventory Education Initiatives

=== Ko Olina tax credits ===
In 2002, while in the state legislature, Hanabusa emerged as the leading advocate for legislation authorizing $75 million in tax credits for Ko Olina Resort, a move she declared necessary to spur development for the Leeward area, but which others saw as a reward for a close associate and political backer, Ko Olina developer Jeff Stone. When Governor Ben Cayetano vetoed the tax credit bill, Hanabusa took the unprecedented step of suing to overturn the veto.

Within months, Hanabusa's then-fiancé John Souza received a preferential deal in purchasing one of Stone's homes in Ko Olina. In February 2005, less than two years after Souza bought the home, he sold it for a $421,000 profit, according to real estate records. Souza and Hanabusa, who were engaged at the time and married in 2008, then bought a $1 million home in another Ko Olina subdivision developed by Centex Homes of Texas.

The Ko Olina tax-credit legislation, intended to promote development of a "world-class" aquarium at the resort, expired after plans for the aquarium were abandoned. Ko Olina Resort eventually returned the tax credit, but the Lingle Administration and Hanabusa disagreed on how to use the returned funds.

== U.S. House of Representatives ==
=== Elections ===
==== 2010 ====
Hanabusa ran unsuccessfully in the May 22, 2010, special election to serve out the remaining months of former representative Neil Abercrombie's term; then-City Councilman Charles Djou defeated her without winning a majority of the votes under the rules of the all-party election that split the Democratic vote between Hanabusa and rival Ed Case, a moderate Democrat.

U.S. Senators Daniel Inouye and Daniel Akaka supported Hanabusa's special election campaign and backed her again in the September primary. Some in the national Democratic Party indicated a preference for Case, who previously served in the U.S. House of Representatives before an unsuccessful U.S. Senate primary challenge to Akaka in 2006. The national Democratic leadership remained officially neutral.

On May 30, 2010, Case, citing his third-place showing in the special election and to avoid a rift among Democrats that could lead to Djou's winning the November election, announced his withdrawal from the race and gave his support to Hanabusa. That made Hanabusa the top Democratic candidate in the September party primary, which she won. Hanabusa subsequently challenged Djou for the same seat and on November 2 won the general election, 53.2 percent to 46.8 percent.

==== 2012 ====
Although there was some speculation that she would run to succeed retiring senator Daniel Akaka, Hanabusa opted to run for reelection to Congress. She faced Djou again, and defeated him 55% to 45%.

==== 2014 ====
On December 17, 2012, the second-longest serving U.S. Senator in history, Daniel Inouye, who had represented the state of Hawaii since it became a state in 1959, died of respiratory complications. Shortly before his death, Inouye sent Hawaii Governor Neil Abercrombie a letter requesting that Hanabusa be appointed to his seat for the remainder of his term. Hanabusa submitted her name for consideration to the Democratic Party of Hawaii, which then included her on a list of three candidates for Abercrombie's consideration. Abercrombie chose Lieutenant Governor of Hawaii Brian Schatz. On December 26, 2012, Schatz was sworn in by Vice President Joe Biden. On May 2, 2013, Hanabusa announced she would challenge Schatz in the 2014 Democratic primary. She said "Brian was not elected. He was appointed, and I don't think the people have really had an opportunity to weigh in on who they want to represent them in the United States Senate."

In May, Hanabusa was endorsed by Inouye's widow, Irene, who said, "Shortly after she was elected president of the Hawaii State Senate, Dan recognized that Colleen was more than capable of succeeding him and he began to mentor her. His last wish was that Colleen serve out his term because he was confident in her ability to step into the Senate and immediately help Hawaii." Hanabusa's campaign hired many of Inouye's staffers. Polling throughout the campaign was controversially mixed, with each campaign releasing different poll results. In the end, Schatz won narrowly, with 115,401 votes to Hanabusa's 113,632.

==== 2016 ====
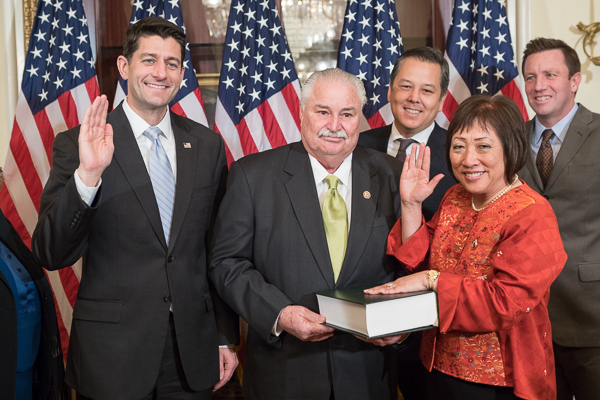
Hanabusa being sworn in by Speaker Paul Ryan

In May 2016 Hanabusa's successor in the House, Mark Takai, announced he was not running for reelection that year due to pancreatic cancer. Hanabusa subsequently announced that she would once again run for the seat. Prior to his July 20, 2016, death, Takai endorsed Hanabusa to succeed him. Two weeks after his death, on August 3, Hanabusa announced that she would also run in the special election on November 8, 2016, the same date as the regularly scheduled election, to finish Takai's term in the 114th United States Congress. On August 13 she easily won the Democratic primary for the general election. On October 24 Hanabusa resigned as Chair of the HART Board. She won both the special and general elections with more than 65 percent of the vote.

=== Tenure ===
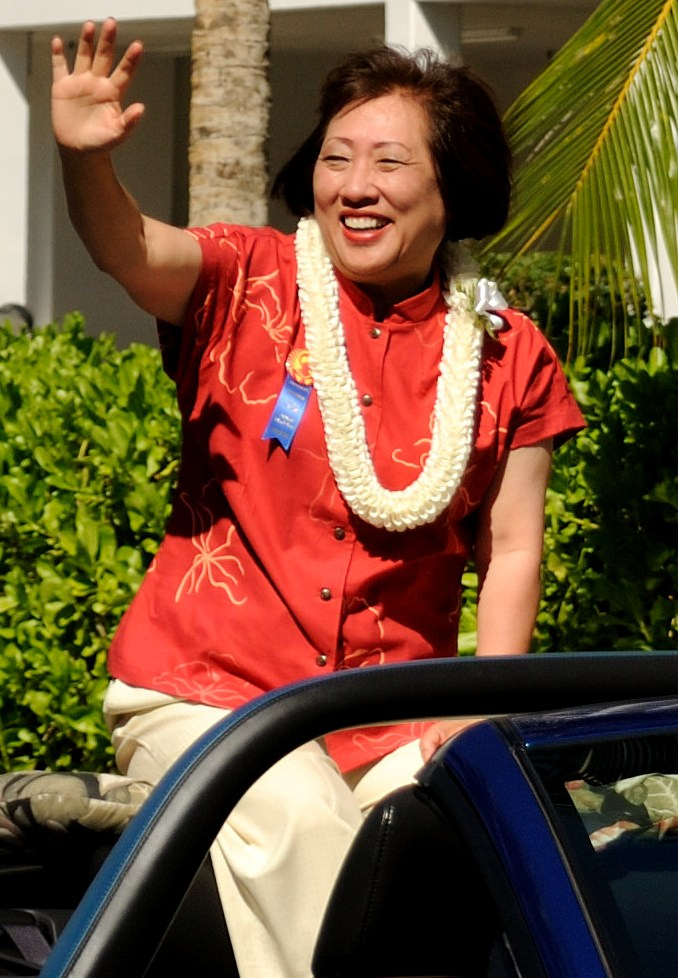
Hanabusa at the Aloha Floral Parade in 2010

After House GOP leader John Boehner pledged to give incumbent Congressman Charles Djou a seat on the Appropriations Committee, Senator Daniel Inouye said that Democrats would also name Hanabusa to Appropriations. However, House Democratic leadership instead appointed her to the Armed Services and Natural Resources committees.

Hanabusa was the third Buddhist to join the United States Congress, preceded by Hank Johnson of Georgia and Mazie Hirono of Hawaii. Her election made Hawaii the only state with a majority non-Christian House delegation. She was a member of the New Democrat Coalition.

Hanabuaa left the House at the end of the 113th Congress to run for U.S. Senate in 2014, losing in the primary. After regaining the seat in 2016, she chose to run in the Democratic primary for governor of Hawaii in 2018, leaving the House again after the 115th Congress.

=== Legislation ===
As a representative, Hanabusa sponsored 14 bills, including:

==== 112th Congress (2011–2012) ====
- H.R. 3320, a bill to increase funds for grants to U.S. owned Pacific islands to offset costs resulting from the residency of people from a Compact of Free Association (COFA) member-state, introduced November 2, 2011. Hanabusa introduced a similar bill, H.R. 1222, in the 113th Congress.

==== 113th Congress (2013–2014) ====
- H.R. 912, a bill to allow for Medicaid to provide care to people lawfully residing in a U.S. owned Pacific island who are from a COFA member-state, introduced February 28, 2013
- H.R. 2225, a bill to change Memorial Day from the last Monday in May to its previous date of May 30, introduced June 3, 2013

In addition to the bills listed above, Hanabusa sponsored several bills relating to Filipino World War II veterans that would, among other things, recognize their efforts in World War II and provide veteran benefits to them.

=== Committee assignments (115th Congress) ===
- House Armed Services Committee (HASC)
  - Subcommittee on Seapower and Projection Forces
  - Subcommittee on Strategic Forces
- House Committee on Natural Resources
  - Subcommittee on Federal Lands (Ranking Member)
  - Subcommittee on Indian Insular, and Alaska Native Affairs
- House Committee on Science, Space, and Technology
  - Subcommittee on Environment

=== Caucus memberships ===
- Congressional Asian Pacific American Caucus

== Inter-congressional career ==
After leaving Congress in January 2015, Hanabusa continued with her labor law practice. In June 2015 Honolulu mayor Kirk Caldwell appointed her to the board of directors of the Honolulu Authority for Rapid Transportation (HART), the builder of Skyline, to replace Carrie Okinaga. She became its chairperson in April 2016 and resigned from it in October 2016. She served on the board of directors for Hawaii Gas from June 2015 to November 2016.

== 2018 gubernatorial election ==
Hanabusa decided not to run for reelection to the U.S. House of Representatives in 2018 and instead ran for statewide office, this time for governor of Hawaii. She challenged incumbent governor David Ige in the Democratic primary. Based on polling as late as May 2018, she was favored to defeat Ige in the August primary, but Ige won, 51% to 44%. Fellow Democrat Ed Case ran for and won Hanabusa's House seat, and took office in January 2019.

== 2020 Honolulu mayoral election ==
On February 29, 2020, Hanabusa officially launched her campaign for mayor of Honolulu, joining several other candidates for the office. She placed third in the August 2020 nonpartisan blanket primary and then endorsed Rick Blangiardi, who won the general election in November.

== Rail board ==
In July 2021, Hanabusa was elected again to the Honolulu Authority for Rapid Transportation board of directors, and again as its chairperson, after having resigned from the role in 2016. In 2024, she was elected to an additional one-year term as chairperson. Hanabusa resigned from the board in September 2025.

== Personal life and death ==
Hanabusa married former state sheriff John F. Souza III in 2008, after their engagement was noted in 2004. Hanabusa had no children.

Hanabusa died from cancer on March 6, 2026, at the age of 74.

== See also ==
- Women in the United States House of Representatives
- List of Asian Americans and Pacific Islands Americans in the United States Congress

Political offices
| Preceded by Robert Bunda | President of the Hawaii Senate; 2009–2010 | Succeeded by Shan Tsutsui |
U.S. House of Representatives
| Preceded by Charles Djou | Member of the U.S. House of Representatives from Hawaii's 1st congressional district 2011–2015 | Succeeded by Mark Takai |
| Preceded by Mark Takai | Member of the U.S. House of Representatives from Hawaii's 1st congressional district 2016–2019 | Succeeded by Ed Case |
