= London Necropolis =

London Necropolis may refer to:

- Brookwood Cemetery, also known as the London Necropolis
- London Necropolis Company, operators of Brookwood Cemetery
- London Necropolis railway station, near Waterloo station in London
