= London Necropolis railway station =

Former railway station in London

London Necropolis
- The Westminster Bridge Road entrance to the first London terminus. The ornate gates were originally designed for the Great Exhibition.

General information
- Location: London, London Borough of Lambeth; England
- Coordinates: 51°29′57″N 0°06′50″W
- Grid reference: TQ309795
- Platforms: 2

Other information
- Status: Disused

History
- Original company: London Necropolis Railway

Key dates
- 13 November 1854: Opened
- 8 February 1902: Resited
- 11 April 1941: Closed
Location

London Necropolis railway station was the terminus at Waterloo, London, of the London Necropolis Railway. The London Necropolis was opened in 1854 in response to severe overcrowding in London's existing graveyards and cemeteries. It aimed to use the recently developed technology of the railway to move as many burials as possible to the newly built Brookwood Cemetery in Brookwood, Surrey. This location was within easy travelling distance of London, but distant enough for the dead not to pose any risk to public hygiene. There were two locations for the station; the first was in operation from 1854 to 1902, the second from 1902 to 1941.

Although it had its own branch line into Brookwood Cemetery, most of the route of the London Necropolis Railway ran on the existing London and South Western Railway (LSWR). Consequently, a site was selected in Waterloo, near the LSWR's recently opened London terminus at Waterloo Bridge station (now London Waterloo). The building was specifically designed for the use of mourners. It had many private waiting rooms, which could also be used to hold funeral services, and a hydraulic lift to raise coffins to platform level. Existing railway arches were used for the storage of bodies.

In 1899 the location of the terminus was blocking the expansion of Waterloo station. After much negotiation, the LSWR reached agreement with the London Necropolis Company, the owners of the cemetery and the railway: in return for the existing site, the LSWR re-equipped the London Necropolis Railway and supplied it with a new station on Westminster Bridge Road. This new building was designed to contrast with other funeral directors' premises by being as attractive as possible. In 1902 the railway moved into the new building, and the earlier station was demolished.

On 16 April 1941, during World War II the station was heavily damaged in an air raid. Much of the building was destroyed and the tracks to the station were rendered unusable. Although some funeral trains continued to run from nearby Waterloo station, the London terminus was never used again. Following the end of the war the London Necropolis Company decided that reopening the London Necropolis Railway was not financially worthwhile, and the surviving railway adjacent company office building at 121 Westminster Bridge Road was sold. This remnant remains intact, and relatively unaltered.

== Background ==
In the first half of the 19th century the population of London more than doubled, from a little under a million people in 1801 to almost two and a half million in 1851. The city's dead had been buried in and around the local churches. With a limited amount of space for burials, the oldest graves were regularly exhumed to free space for new burials. Despite the rapid growth in population, the amount of land set aside for use as graveyards remained unchanged at approximately 300 acres (0.5 sq mi; 1.2 km^{2}), spread across around 200 small sites. Even relatively fresh graves had to be exhumed to free up space for new burials, their contents being unearthed and scattered. Decaying corpses contaminated the water supply, and the city suffered regular epidemics of cholera, smallpox, measles and typhoid. A royal commission established in 1842 to investigate the problem concluded that London's burial grounds had become so overcrowded that it was impossible to dig a new grave without cutting through an existing one. In 1848–49 a cholera epidemic killed 14,601 people in London and overwhelmed the burial system completely.

In the wake of public concerns following the cholera epidemics and the findings of a royal commission, the Burial Act 1852 (15 & 16 Vict. c. 85) was passed. Under this act, new burials were prohibited in what were then the built-up areas of London.

=== London Necropolis Company ===
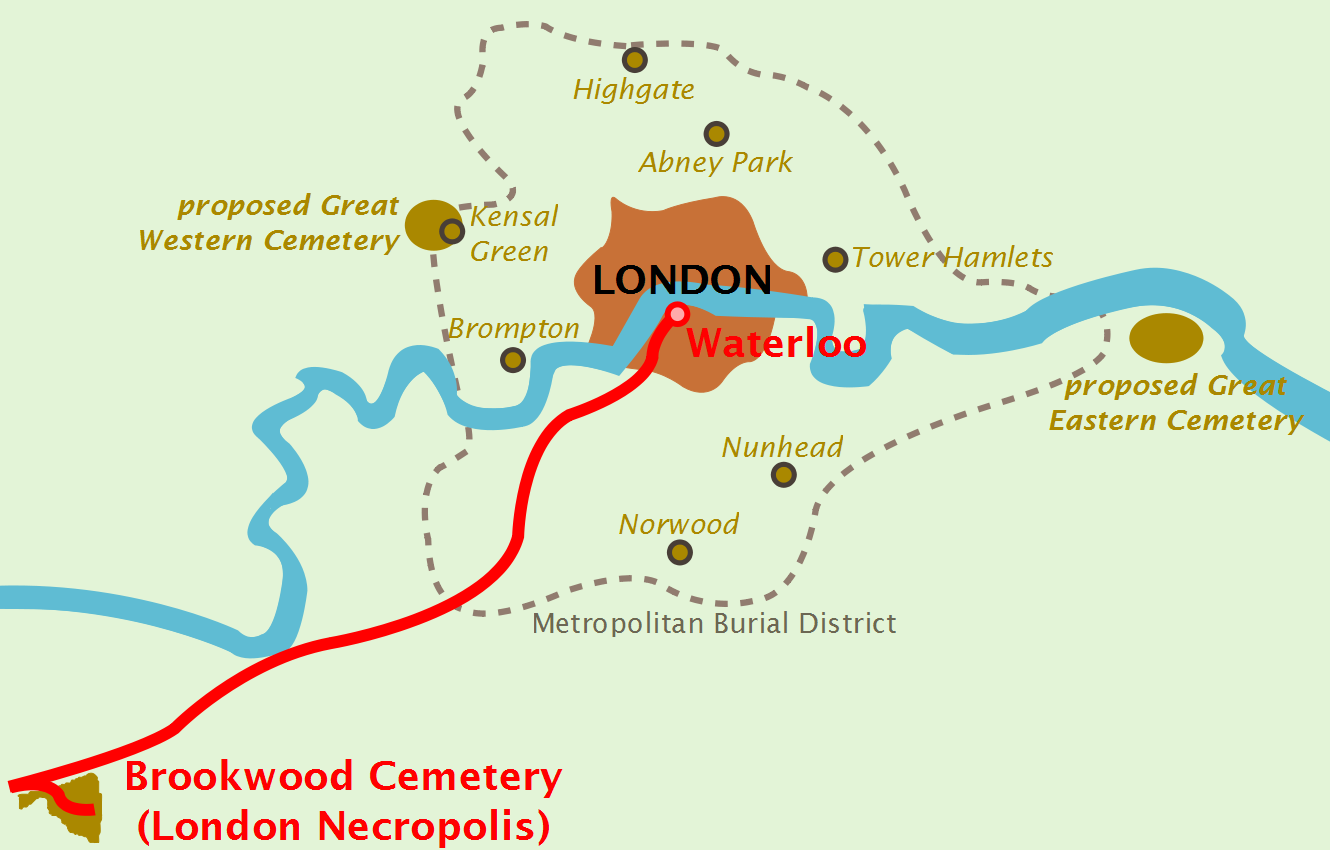
Proposed solutions to the burial crisis, 1852. A ring of new cemeteries had opened outside the built-up area of London, but were only a temporary solution. Edwin Chadwick planned two large new cemeteries just outside the boundaries of the Metropolitan Burial District, while the promoters of the Necropolis scheme planned a single large cemetery far enough from the city so as never to be affected by urban growth, to be reached by railway.

Sir Richard Broun and Richard Sprye proposed to use the emerging technology of mechanised land transport to solve the problem of London's dead. Broun and Sprye envisaged buying a single very large tract of land around 23 miles (37 km) from London in Brookwood near Woking, Surrey, to be called Brookwood Cemetery or the London Necropolis. (Note: The names "London Necropolis" and "Brookwood Cemetery" were both used for the site. The tract of land was named "Brookwood Cemetery", while the company responsible for burials and maintenance used the name "London Necropolis". The formal name of the company on its incorporation in 1852 was "The London Necropolis and National Mausoleum Company". In 1927, with the proposed National Mausoleum still unbuilt, it was changed to "The London Necropolis Company".)

At this distance, the land would be far beyond the maximum anticipated size of the city's growth, greatly reducing any potential hazards. The London and South Western Railway (LSWR) – which had connected London to Woking in 1838 – would enable bodies and mourners to be shipped from London to the site easily and cheaply. Although the Brookwood site was a long distance from London, Broun and Sprye argued that the speed of the railway made it both quicker and cheaper to reach than the seven existing cemeteries, all of which required a slow and expensive horse-drawn hearse to carry the body and mourners from London to the burial site.

On 30 June 1852 the promoters of the Brookwood scheme were given parliamentary consent to proceed, and the London Necropolis and National Mausoleum Company (LNC) was formed. The former Woking Common, owned by the Earl of Onslow at Brookwood was chosen as the site for the new cemetery. To prevent the LSWR from exploiting its monopoly on access to the cemetery, the local act of Parliament authorising the scheme, the London Necropolis and National Mausoleum Act 1852 (15 & 16 Vict. c. cxlix) bound the LSWR to carry corpses and mourners to the cemetery in perpetuity and set a maximum tariff which could be levied on funeral traffic, but did not specify detail of how the funeral trains were to operate.

On 7 November 1854 the new cemetery opened and the southern Anglican section was consecrated by Charles Sumner, Bishop of Winchester. (Note: Traditional English burial practice was for graveyards and cemeteries to be divided into an Anglican south and a Nonconformist north. The tradition derived from churchyard burials, where Church of England burials were conducted in the sunny area south of the church, and the unbaptised and those who did not want to be buried in an Anglican ceremony were buried in the shadowed area north of the church.) On 13 November the first scheduled London Necropolis Railway train left the new London Necropolis railway station for the cemetery, and the first burial (that of the stillborn twins of a Mr and Mrs Hore of Ewer Street, Southwark Borough) took place.

== First station (1854–1902) ==
A site for the London terminus near Waterloo had been suggested by Sir Richard Broun. Its proximity to the River Thames meant that bodies could be cheaply transported to the terminus by water from much of London, while being situated near three major Thames bridges meant that the area was easily accessed from both north and south of the river by road. The arches of the huge brick viaduct carrying the LSWR into Waterloo Bridge station (now London Waterloo station) were easily converted into mortuaries. Broun also felt that the journey out of London from Waterloo Bridge would be less distressing for mourners: while most of the rail routes out of London ran through tunnels and deep cuttings, or through densely populated areas, at this time the urban development of what is now south London had not taken place and the LSWR route ran almost entirely through parkland and countryside. The LNC also contemplated taking over the LSWR's former terminus at Nine Elms railway station (which following the 1848 opening of the much more convenient Waterloo Bridge station was used only for goods traffic, chartered trains taking migrants to North America, and the private trains of the royal family) as either the main or a secondary terminus. Despite objections from local residents concerned about the effects of potentially large numbers of dead bodies being stored in a largely residential area, in March 1854 the LNC settled on a single terminus in Waterloo and purchased a plot of land between Westminster Bridge Road and York Street (now Leake Street) for the site.

Architect William Tite and engineer William Cubitt drew up a design for a station, which was approved in June 1854. The station was completed in October 1854, at a total construction cost of £23,231 14s 4d (about £2.75 million in terms of 2023 spending power). On 13 November 1854 the first train left London for the new London Necropolis.

Tite and Cubitt's design was based around a three-storey main building, separated from the LSWR's main viaduct by a private access road beneath the LNC's twin rail lines. The private access road was intended to allow mourners to arrive and leave discreetly, and to avoid the need for hearses to stop in the public road. The ground floor contained a grand entrance hall and staircase for mourners attending first and second class funerals, a smaller entrance hall and staircase for those attending lower classes of funeral, and two mortuaries which occupied the majority of the floor. A large room adjacent to the mortuary held a reserve stock of around 300 coffins. Most mourners would have commissioned their own coffins, or used coffins bought by the deceased during their lifetime but, explained an official of the LNC (in 1898) the reserve of coffins was kept so that "should a guest die in a hotel, and the landlord wished to keep it quiet, we are notified, and in the middle of the night we come for the corpse, and take it away in one of our ready-made wooden overcoats". The first floor held the LNC's boardroom, the LNC's funerary workshops, a series of separate waiting rooms for those attending second and third class funerals, and the building's main toilets. The second floor, level with the LSWR railway line, held the train shed covering the two private rail lines and the single platform at which the trains stopped, eight or nine waiting rooms for first class mourners, and further toilets for their use. (Note: Only one of the two rail tracks at the terminus had a platform; the other was used for storage.) A steam-powered lift carried coffins from the lower floors to the platform level. (Note: Although there is no record of the steam engine being removed or damaged, by 1898 the coffin lift to platform level was worked by hand rather than steam-driven.) A glass roof was positioned in order that no shadow be cast on the hearse carriage waiting at the platform at the time the trains were scheduled to depart, and the western wall was windowless to avoid passengers using the LSWR station being able to see into the Necropolis station. Glass panels inset between the two rail lines allowed sunlight through to the private access road below. Unlike most railway stations of the period, the designs of the first, second and third class waiting rooms were largely identical with only superficial differences.

Although the original terminus did not have its own chapel, on some occasions mourners would not be able or willing to make the journey to a ceremony at Brookwood but for personal or religious reasons were unable to hold the funeral service in a London church. On these occasions one of the waiting rooms would be used as a makeshift funeral chapel. One of the more notable funerals to be held at the terminus was that of Friedrich Engels, co-creator (with Karl Marx) of modern communism, who died in London on 5 August 1895. Engels had expressed a wish to be cremated and his ashes scattered at sea, but there was no crematorium near London. (Note: Golders Green Crematorium, the first crematorium near London, opened in 1902.) The LNC had an arrangement with Woking Crematorium, by which Necropolis Railway stations and trains could be used by mourners attending cremations at Woking. For Engels's funeral on 10 August 1895 around 150 people attended a morning service in a waiting room at the LNC terminus. Although the cremation was scheduled for 1:15 pm formalities with the death certificate delayed the departure, and the special train did not arrive at the cemetery's North station (the station serving the part of the cemetery reserved for non-Anglicans) until after 4:00 pm. The majority of the mourners remained at North station in the cemetery, and only 12 mourners accompanied the coffin to Woking; as the service had already been held in London, on arrival at Woking, Engels's body was transferred straight from the hearse to the furnace. Engels's ashes (cremated remains) were recovered from the furnace and transferred to an unrecorded location in Brookwood Cemetery, and 17 days later removed from the cemetery and scattered from Beachy Head (in East Sussex). Karl Marx's daughter Eleanor Marx died in 1898 and was also cremated at Woking following a service at the LNC's London terminus (probably in the same room in which Engels's service had been held three years previously) and carriage to North station by the Necropolis Railway. (Note: Her ashes were unclaimed following the cremation, and were kept in the London offices of the Social Democratic Federation and later the Communist Party of Great Britain and the Marx Memorial Library. In 1956 the grave of Karl Marx was repositioned within Highgate Cemetery, and the opportunity was taken to inter Eleanor Marx's ashes alongside her father's body.) Woking Crematorium, first used for human cremation in 1885, cooperated closely with the LNC, as they hoped to prevent the LNC building their own crematorium at Brookwood. The LNC never built their own crematorium, although a columbarium (building for the storage of cremation ashes) was added to Brookwood Cemetery in 1910.

For extremely large funerals such as those of major public figures, the LSWR would provide additional trains from Waterloo to Brookwood station on the main line to meet the demand. Charles Bradlaugh, Member of Parliament for Northampton, was a vocal advocate of Indian self-government and a popular figure among the Indian community in London, many of whom attended his funeral on 3 February 1891. Over 5,000 mourners, including 21-year-old Mohandas Gandhi, were carried on three long special LSWR trains, one of which was 17 carriages long.

In 1874, with Waterloo Bridge station becoming extremely busy, the LSWR attempted to take over one of the LNC's two rail lines. An 1875 agreement between the LSWR and LNC permitted the LSWR to take over the westernmost track (that not served by the platform), in return for improved terms on the lease of the land currently leased by the LNC from the LSWR, and the LSWR taking over the maintenance of the structure supporting the LNC lines. In 1876 and 1877 the roof and western wall of the LNC train shed were demolished and replaced with a cantilevered awning over the single platform; the platform was extended to compensate for the loss of the second line.

=== Waterloo expansion proposal ===
In 1889 Waterloo station (renamed from Waterloo Bridge station in 1886) was equipped with new signals, which required a gantry spanning all the lines into the station. In return for the LSWR cladding the LNC's entrance on Westminster Bridge Road with white glazed brick, the LNC gave consent for the stanchion supporting the gantry to rest on the LNC's platform, while reserving the right to demand the gantry be removed. At this time the LSWR also leased a small plot of land west of the Westminster Bridge Road entrance to serve as the site of new offices for the LNC, designed by Cyril Bazett Tubbs.

As the site of the Necropolis station had been intentionally chosen to abut the arches of the LSWR's viaduct, it acted as an obstacle to any increase in the number of lines serving Waterloo station. Urban growth in the area of what is now south west London, through which trains from Waterloo ran, led to congestion at the station, only slightly alleviated by the LSWR's 1877 takeover of the western LNC track. In the 1890s the situation became untenable, and the LSWR began to investigate the possibility of repositioning the LNC station to permit the expansion of the main line terminus.

In 1896 the LSWR formally presented the LNC with a proposal to provide the LNC with a new station in return for the existing station. The LNC agreed to the proposals, but with a number of conditions attached. The LSWR was to allow the LNC control of the design of the new station, lease the new station to the LNC for a token rent in perpetuity, provide new rolling stock, remove any limit on the number of passengers using the Necropolis service, and provide the free carriage of machinery and equipment to be used in the cemetery. The LNC had an extremely strong negotiating position as their existing site was crucial to any expansion of Waterloo station, and in addition they had the legal right to demand the removal of the stanchion supporting Waterloo's signal gantry. Although the LSWR was extremely unhappy at what they considered excessive demands, they had no choice but to comply. In May 1899 the companies signed an agreement, in which the LSWR gave in to every LNC demand. In addition the LSWR paid £12,000 compensation (about £1.71 million in terms of 2023 consumer spending power) for the inconvenience of relocating the LNC station and offices, and agreed that mourners returning from the cemetery could travel on any LSWR train to Waterloo, Vauxhall or Clapham Junction.

== Second station (1902–1941) ==
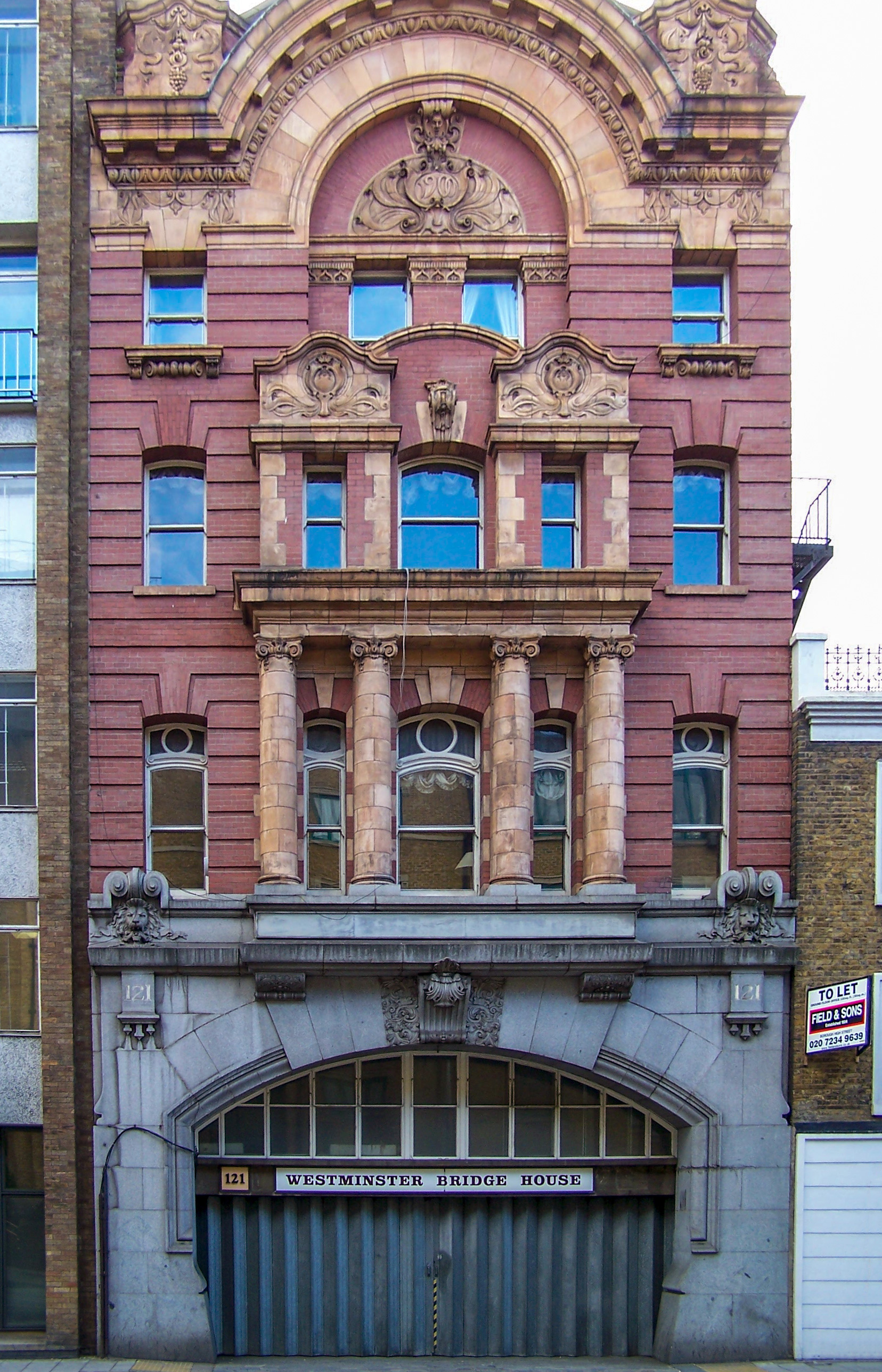
The offices of the LNC at 121 Westminster Bridge Road, including the first class entrance to the 1902 terminus.

The site for the replacement terminus was identified in 1896, and bought by the LSWR in 1899 for £5,500 (about £622,000 in terms of 2023 consumer spending power). South of the existing station and on the opposite side of Westminster Bridge Road, its main entrance was at 121 Westminster Bridge Road. The site was roughly S-shaped: the entrance from Westminster Bridge Road led to a strip of land at a right angle to the entrance and running behind existing buildings on Westminster Bridge Road. This in turn led to the location identified for the two new rail lines, at a right angle to the central strip (i.e. parallel to the entrance). Work on the new station began in the summer of 1900, and was completed on 8 February 1902 at a total construction cost to the LSWR of £43,494 (about £5.96 million in terms of 2023 consumer spending power) excluding the cost of the land.

While construction was underway the original terminus remained in use, although the LSWR was granted running rights through the station. On 23 February Major J. W. Pringle of the Board of Trade inspected the new building and expressed concerns over the safety of the arrangements for trains entering the station from the main line, which entailed crossing the LSWR's multiple tracks. He was also unhappy about the newly installed passenger lifts and the unfinished nature of the passenger terminus, but nonetheless approved the limited use of the new station for funeral trains. Soon after the transfer of LNC services to the new building the LSWR viaduct was widened to serve a greatly enlarged Waterloo station, destroying all traces of the original LNC terminus.

The new building, also designed by Cyril Bazett Tubbs, was designed for attractiveness and modernity to contrast with the traditional gloomy decor associated with the funeral industry. A narrow four-storey office building stood at 188 Westminster Bridge Road. The ground floor was taken up by a large arch leading to a waiting room, an office for general enquiries, and the long driveway leading to the station itself; above this were the LNC's offices and boardrooms.

First class mourners entered through the driveway under the office building which turned sharply left to run beneath a glass canopy parallel to Westminster Bridge Road; this stretch was faced with glazed white brick and lined with palm and bay trees. The driveway ran past mortuaries and storerooms to the lifts and stairs to the platforms, and also to a secondary entrance on Newnham Terrace (off Hercules Road). Above the mortuaries and storerooms were the LNC's workshops. Lifts and an elaborate wrought-iron staircase led from the lower two floors to platform level on the second floor. This upper level housed a sumptuous oak-panelled chapelle ardente, intended for mourners unable to make the journey to Brookwood to pay their respects to the deceased. A short and wide pathway led to the first class platform, lined with waiting rooms and a ticket office; the first class platform was equipped with five separate waiting rooms to keep mourners from different funeral parties separate.

A glass screen separated the first class platform and circulating area from the platform and circulating area for third class passengers. The third class section was entered from the secondary entrance in Newnham Terrace, and was more sparsely furnished and not equipped with lifts. From the Newnham Terrace entrance a staircase led to a single communal waiting room on the first floor, and to the third class platform on the second floor, much shorter than the first class platform.

There was still an ability to transport large parties on occasions. The funeral of Indian businessman Sir Nowroji Saklatwala on 25 July 1938 saw 155 mourners travelling first class on a dedicated LNC train.

== Operations ==
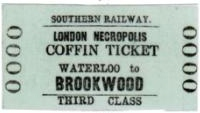
Third class coffin ticket, issued between April–September 1925.

The London Necropolis Company offered three classes of funerals. A first class funeral allowed the person buying the funeral to select the grave site of their choice anywhere in the cemetery; (Note: The LNC charged extra for burials in some designated special sites in the cemetery.) at the time of opening, first class prices began at £2 10s (about £296 in 2023 terms) for a basic 9-by-4-foot (2.7 m × 1.2 m) plot with no special coffin specifications. It was expected by the LNC that those using first class graves would erect a permanent memorial of some kind in due course following the funeral. Second class funerals cost £1 (about £119 in 2023 terms) and allowed some control over the burial location. The right to erect a permanent memorial cost an additional 10 shillings (about £59 in 2023 terms); if a permanent memorial was not erected the LNC reserved the right to re-use the grave in future. Third class funerals were reserved for pauper funerals; those buried at parish expense in the section of the cemetery designated for that parish. Although the LNC was forbidden from using mass graves (other than the burial of next of kin in the same grave) and thus even the lowest class of funeral provided a separate grave for the deceased, third class funerals were not granted the right to erect a permanent memorial on the site. (The families of those buried could pay afterwards to upgrade a third class grave to a higher class if they later wanted to erect a memorial, but this practice was rare.) Despite this, Brookwood's pauper graves granted more dignity to the deceased than did other graveyards and cemeteries of the period, all of which other than Brookwood continued the practice of mass graves for the poor. Brookwood was one of the few cemeteries to permit burials on Sundays, which made it a popular choice with the poor as it allowed people to attend funerals without the need to take a day off work. As theatrical performances were banned on Sundays at this time, it also made Brookwood a popular choice for the burial of actors for the same reason, to the extent that actors were provided with a dedicated section of the cemetery near the station entrance.

For those third class funerals paid for by the parish, two third class tickets would be provided at the parish's expense (one ticket in the case of a child's death). Further mourners for third class funerals were obliged to pay for their own tickets to the Necropolis.

On arrival at the terminus the mourners would be led either to one of the dedicated first class waiting rooms (for first and second class funerals) or to the communal third class waiting room. The coffin would be discreetly unloaded from the hearse and sent to the platform level by lift. Those attending first and second class funerals would be permitted to watch the coffins being loaded onto the train if they so wished. (After the relocation to the new London terminus in 1902, some funeral services would be held in the Chapelle Ardente at platform level, for those cases where mourners were unable to make the journey to Brookwood.) Each door of the waiting train would be labelled with the name of the deceased, to ensure all passengers travelled with the correct funeral party; the names of the deceased being carried on the train would be called in turn, and that person's mourners would board the train.

At the time the service was inaugurated, the LNC's trains were divided both by class and by religion, with separate Anglican and Nonconformist sections of the train. This distinction applied to both living and dead passengers. Intended to prevent persons from different social background from mixing and potentially distressing mourners and to prevent bodies of persons from different social classes being carried in the same compartment rather than to provide different facilities, the carriages intended for all classes and religions were very similar in design, and the primary difference was different ornamentation on the compartment doors.

At 11.35 am (11.20 am on Sundays) the train would leave London for Brookwood, arriving at Necropolis Junction (where the branch line into the cemetery left the main LSWR line) at 12.25 pm (12.20 pm on Sundays).

The train only ran if there was a coffin or passengers at the London terminus waiting to use it, and both the journey from London to Brookwood and the later return would be cancelled if nobody was due to leave London that morning. It would not run if there was only a single third or second class coffin to be carried, and in these cases the coffin and funeral party would be held until the next service. Generally the trains ran direct from London to the cemetery, other than occasional stops to take on water. Between 1890 and 1910 the trains also sometimes stopped at Vauxhall and Clapham Junction for the benefit of mourners from south west London who did not want to travel via the Waterloo terminus, but these intermediate stops were discontinued and never reinstated. After 1 October 1900 the Sunday trains were discontinued, and from 1902 the daily train service was ended and trains ran only as required.

== Destruction ==
During the Second World War Waterloo station and the nearby Thames bridges were a significant target for Axis bombing, and there were several near-misses on the Necropolis station during the London Blitz of 1940–41. Although there were several interruptions to the Necropolis train service owing to enemy action elsewhere on the line, the Necropolis station was undamaged during the early stages of the bombing campaign, and services generally continued as normal.

During the night of 16–17 April 1941, in one of the last major air raids on London, (Note: The air raid of 16 April 1941 was the single most damaging during the London Blitz in terms of loss of life, with 1,180 killed and 2,230 seriously injured. Over 150,000 incendiary bombs and 890 tons of high explosive were dropped on London over a 9 1/2 hour period, causing around 22,000 fires.) bombs repeatedly fell on the Waterloo area, and the LNC's good fortune in avoiding damage to their facilities finally ran out. In the early stages of the air raid the rolling stock stored in the Necropolis siding was burned, and the railway arch connecting the main line to the Necropolis terminus was damaged, although the terminal building itself remained unscathed.

At 10.30 pm multiple incendiary devices and high explosive bombs struck the central section of the terminus building. While the office building and platforms survived, the workshops, driveway and Chapelle Ardente were destroyed, along with the third class waiting room. (Note: Although the station was destroyed on the night of 16–17 April, the last train had run on 11 April.) The Divisional Engineer of the Southern Railway (SR, which had absorbed the LSWR in the 1923 restructuring of Britain's railways) inspected the damage at 2.00 pm on 17 April, and his report read simply "Necropolis and buildings demolished".

On 11 May 1941 the station was officially declared closed. (Note: Some sources give an official closure date of 15 May. As the station building had been destroyed and the arches carrying the branch line into the station rendered unusable the previous month, the "closure date" is a technicality.) The last recorded funeral carried on the London Necropolis Railway was that of Chelsea Pensioner Edward Irish (1868–1941), buried on 11 April 1941. (Note: A second, unidentified, coffin was also carried on the last train. As the deceased's identity is not recorded, it is impossible to determine whether this person or Irish was the last funeral party carried on the London Necropolis Railway. Although the LNC conducted most of its business by road after the destruction of the London terminus, on occasion coffins and funeral parties were carried by the SR from Waterloo on the LNC's behalf, although funeral trains were never again operated by the LNC directly.) The SR offered the LNC the temporary use of platform 11 or 12 of Waterloo station to allow the service to be continued, but refused to allow the LNC to continue to sell cheap tickets to visitors travelling to and from the cemetery stations other than those involved in a funeral that day, meaning those visiting the cemetery had little reason to choose the LNC's irregular and infrequent trains over the SR's fast and frequent services to their own Brookwood railway station. The LNC attempted to negotiate a deal by which bona fide mourners could still travel cheaply to the cemetery on the 11.57 am service to Brookwood (the SR service closest to the LNC's traditional departure time), but the SR management (themselves under severe financial pressure owing to wartime constraints and damage) refused to entertain any compromise.

== Closure ==
In September 1945, following the end of hostilities, the directors of the LNC met to consider whether to rebuild the terminus and reopen the London Necropolis Railway. Although the main line from Waterloo to Brookwood had remained in use throughout the war and was in good condition, the branch line from Brookwood into the cemetery had been almost unused since the destruction of the London terminus. With the soil of the cemetery causing the branch to deteriorate even when it had been in use and regularly maintained, the branch line was in extremely poor condition.

Although the original promoters of the scheme had envisaged Brookwood Cemetery becoming London's main or only cemetery, the scheme had never been as popular as they had hoped. In the original proposal, Sir Richard Broun had calculated that over its first century of operations the cemetery would have seen around five million burials at a rate of 50,000 per year, the great majority of which would have utilised the railway. In reality at the time the last train ran on 11 April 1941, almost 87 years after opening, only 203,041 people had been buried in the cemetery. Before the outbreak of hostilities increased use of motorised road transport had damaged the profitability of the railway for both the LNC and the SR. Faced with the costs of rebuilding the cemetery branch line, building a new London terminus and replacing the rolling stock damaged or destroyed in the air raid, the directors concluded that "past experience and present changed conditions made the running of the Necropolis private train obsolete". In mid-1946 the LNC formally informed the SR that the Westminster Bridge Road terminus would not be reopened.

The decision prompted complicated negotiations with the SR over the future of the LNC facilities in London. In December 1946 the directors of the two companies finally reached agreement. The railway-related portions of the LNC site (the waiting rooms, the caretaker's flat and the platforms themselves) would pass into the direct ownership of the SR, while the remaining surviving portions of the site (the office block on Westminster Bridge Road, the driveway and the ruined central portion of the site) would pass to the LNC to use or dispose of as they saw fit. The LNC sold the site to the British Humane Association in May 1947 for £21,000 (about £1,038,000 in terms of 2023 consumer spending power), and the offices of the LNC were transferred to the Superintendent's Office at Brookwood. (Note: Although LNC operations were transferred to Brookwood, the LNC leased a building at 123 Westminster Bridge Road from the SR to serve as a London office. This building also served as the registered premises of the company.) The SR continued to use the surviving sections of the track as occasional sidings into the 1950s, before clearing what remained of their section of the site.

With most of the LNC's business being operated by road, an agreement on 13 May 1946 allowed the LNC to make use of SR services from Waterloo to Brookwood station for funerals, subject to the condition that should the service be heavily used the SR (British Railways after 1948) reserved the right to restrict the number of funeral parties on any given train. Although one of the LNC's hearse carriages had survived the bombing it is unlikely that this was ever used, and coffins were carried in the luggage space of the SR's coaches. Coffins would either be shipped to Brookwood ahead of the funeral party and transported by road to one of the mortuaries at the disused cemetery stations, or travel on the same SR train as the funeral party to Brookwood and be transported from Brookwood station to the burial site or chapel by road.

=== The site today ===
The site of the first terminus was cleared during the expansion of the viaduct into Waterloo in the early 20th century, and no trace of it remains. Most of the site of the second station was sold by the LNC and built over with new office developments in the years following the end of the Second World War, but the office building on Westminster Bridge Road, over the former entrance to the station driveway, remains relatively unaltered externally although the words "London Necropolis" carved into the stone above the driveway have been covered. Refurbishments and cleaning in the 1980s restored the façade of the building to an appearance similar to that of the time of its building. Other than iron columns in Newnham Terrace which once supported the Necropolis Railway tracks, and a surviving section of the internal driveway used as a car park, the Westminster Bridge Road building is the only surviving part of the London Necropolis Railway in London.

== Notes and references ==
Notes

Bibliography

- Arnold, Catherine (2006). Necropolis: London and its dead. London: Simon & Schuster. ISBN 978-1-4165-0248-7.
- Brandon, David; Brooke, Alan (2008). London: City of the Dead. Stroud: The History Press. ISBN 978-0-7509-4633-9.
- Clarke, John M. (2004). London's Necropolis. Stroud: Sutton Publishing. ISBN 978-0-7509-3513-5.
- Clarke, John M. (2006). The Brookwood Necropolis Railway. Locomotion Papers. Vol. 143 (4th ed.). Usk, Monmouthshire: The Oakwood Press. ISBN 978-0-85361-655-9.
- Connor, J. E. (2005). The London & South Western Rly. London's Disused Stations. Vol. 5. Colchester: Connor & Butler. ISBN 978-0-947699-38-3.
