= London Necropolis Company =

Cemetery operator established in 1852

Seal of the London Necropolis and National Mausoleum Company

The London Necropolis Company (LNC), formally the London Necropolis and National Mausoleum Company until 1927, (Note: The formal name of the company on its incorporation in 1852 was "London Necropolis and National Mausoleum Company", as mandated by the London Necropolis and National Mausoleum Act 1852, but from the outset it used the name "London Necropolis Company" in its publicity material. In 1927, with the proposed National Mausoleum still unbuilt, the name was formally changed to "London Necropolis Company". The names "London Necropolis" and "Brookwood Cemetery" were both used for the LNC's cemetery in Surrey; the tract of land was named "Brookwood Cemetery", while the transport, burial and cemetery maintenance services used the branding "London Necropolis".) was a cemetery operator established by Act of Parliament in 1852 in reaction to the crisis caused by the closure of London's graveyards in 1851. The LNC intended to establish a single cemetery large enough to accommodate all of London's future burials in perpetuity. The company's founders recognised that the recently invented technology of the railway provided the ability to conduct burials far from populated areas, mitigating concerns over public health risks from living near burial sites. Accordingly, the company bought a large tract of land in Brookwood, Surrey, around 25 miles (40 km) from London, and converted a portion of it into Brookwood Cemetery. A dedicated railway line, the London Necropolis Railway, linked the new cemetery to the city.

Financial mismanagement and internal disputes led to delays in the project. By the time Brookwood Cemetery opened in late 1854, a number of other cemeteries had opened nearer to London or were in the process of opening. While some parishes in London did arrange for the LNC to handle the burials of their dead, many preferred to use nearer cemeteries. The LNC had anticipated handling between 10,000 and 50,000 burials per year, but the number never rose above 4,100 per year, and in its first 150 years of operations only 231,730 burials had been conducted. Buying the land for Brookwood Cemetery and building the cemetery and railway had been very expensive, and by the time the cemetery opened the LNC was already on the verge of bankruptcy. The LNC remained solvent by selling surplus parts of its land, but as the land had been chosen for its remoteness, sales were low.

From the 1880s the LNC began a more aggressive programme to maximise its income. The process for the sale of surplus land was improved, resulting in increased income. The LNC redeveloped its lands at Hook Heath into housing and a golf course, creating a new suburb of Woking and providing a steady income from rentals. After an 1884 ruling that cremation was lawful in England the LNC also took advantage of its proximity to Woking Crematorium by providing transport for bodies and mourners on its railway line and after 1910 by interring ashes in a dedicated columbarium. The LNC also provided the land for a number of significant military cemeteries and memorials at Brookwood after both World Wars. In 1941 London Necropolis railway station, the LNC's London railway terminus, was badly damaged by enemy bombing, and the London Necropolis Railway was abandoned.

Rising property prices in Surrey in the 1940s and 1950s made the LNC increasingly valuable, but also made it a target for property speculators. In 1959 a hostile takeover succeeded, and LNC's independence came to an end. From 1959 to 1985 a succession of owners stripped the profitable parts of the business from the company, leaving a rump residual company operating the increasingly derelict cemetery. In 1985 what remained of the company came into the ownership of Ramadan Güney, who set about reviving what remained. Links were formed with London's Muslim communities in an effort to encourage new burials, and a slow programme of clearing and restoring the derelict sections of the cemetery commenced. Although it was never as successful as planned, the LNC was very influential in both the funeral industry and in the development of the area around Woking, and Brookwood Cemetery remains the largest cemetery in the United Kingdom.

== Background ==
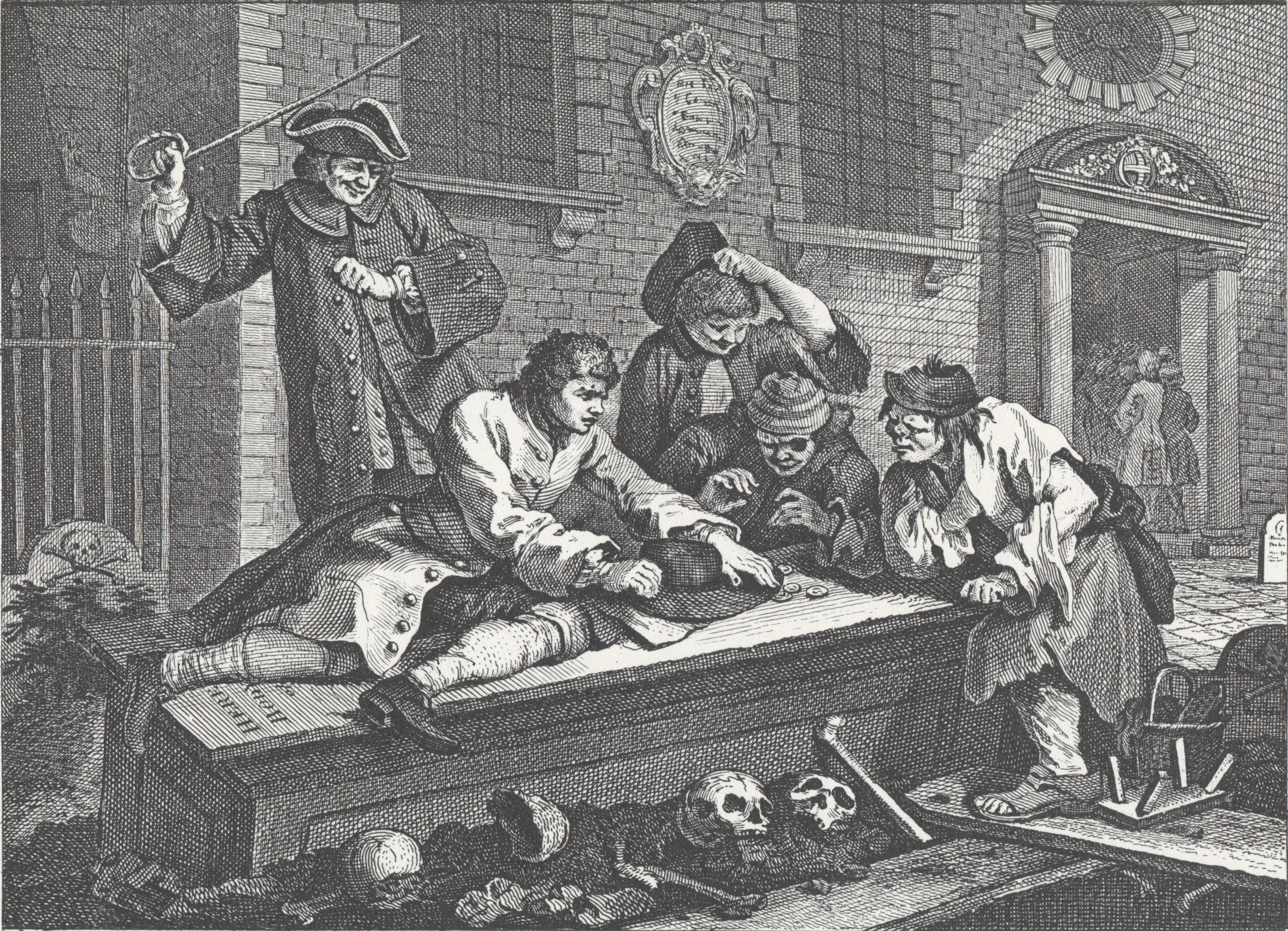
In the eighteenth century London churchyards were squalid and overcrowded. Existing graves were regularly exhumed to free burial space, and the unearthed remains left scattered.

Since the conversion of London to Christianity in the early 7th century, the city's dead had been buried in and around the local churches. With a limited amount of space for burials, the oldest graves were regularly exhumed to free space for new burials, and the remains of the previous occupants transferred to charnel houses for storage. From the 14th century onwards the charnel houses themselves were overwhelmed, and exhumed bones were scattered where they had been dug up or reburied in pits. Despite this practice, by the mid 17th century the city was running seriously short of burial space. A proposal by Christopher Wren to use the reconstruction following the 1666 Great Fire of London as an opportunity to cease burials in the churchyards and establish new cemeteries outside the city was approved by the King and Parliament but vetoed by the Corporation of London, and burials continued at the newly rebuilt churches.

In the first half of the 19th century the population of London more than doubled, from a little under a million people in 1801 to almost two and a half million in 1851. Despite this rapid growth in population, the amount of land set aside for use as graveyards remained unchanged at approximately 300 acres (0.47 sq mi; 1.2 km^{2}), spread across around 200 small sites. The difficulty of digging without disturbing existing graves led to bodies often simply being stacked on top of each other to fit the available space and covered with a layer of earth. In more crowded areas even relatively fresh graves had to be exhumed, their contents unearthed and scattered to create space for new burials. In some cases large pits were dug on existing burial grounds, unearthing the previous burials, and fresh corpses crammed into the available space. Intact material from burials was sold on a thriving market in second-hand coffin furniture, coffin wood was burned as household fuel, and exhumed bones were shipped in bulk to the north of England to be sold as fertiliser. Decaying corpses contaminated the water supply and the city suffered regular epidemics of cholera, smallpox, measles and typhoid; in 1842 the mean working life of a London professional man was 30 years and of a London labourer just 17 years.

Public health policy at this time was shaped by the miasma theory (the belief that airborne particles released by decaying flesh were the primary factor in the spread of contagious illness), and the bad smells and risks of disease caused by piled bodies and exhumed rotting corpses caused great public concern. A royal commission established in 1842 to investigate the problem concluded that London's burial grounds had become so overcrowded that it was impossible to dig a new grave without cutting through an existing one. Commissioner and sanitation campaigner Edwin Chadwick testified that each year, 20,000 adults and 30,000 children were being buried in less than 218 acres (0.34 sq mi; 0.88 km^{2}) of already full burial grounds; the commission heard that one cemetery, Spa Fields in Clerkenwell, designed to hold 1,000 bodies, contained 80,000 graves, and that gravediggers throughout London were obliged to shred bodies in order to cram the remains into available grave space. In 1848–49 a cholera epidemic killed 14,601 people in London and overwhelmed the burial system completely. Bodies were left stacked in heaps awaiting burial, and even relatively recent graves were exhumed to make way for new burials.

=== Proposed solutions to the burial crisis ===
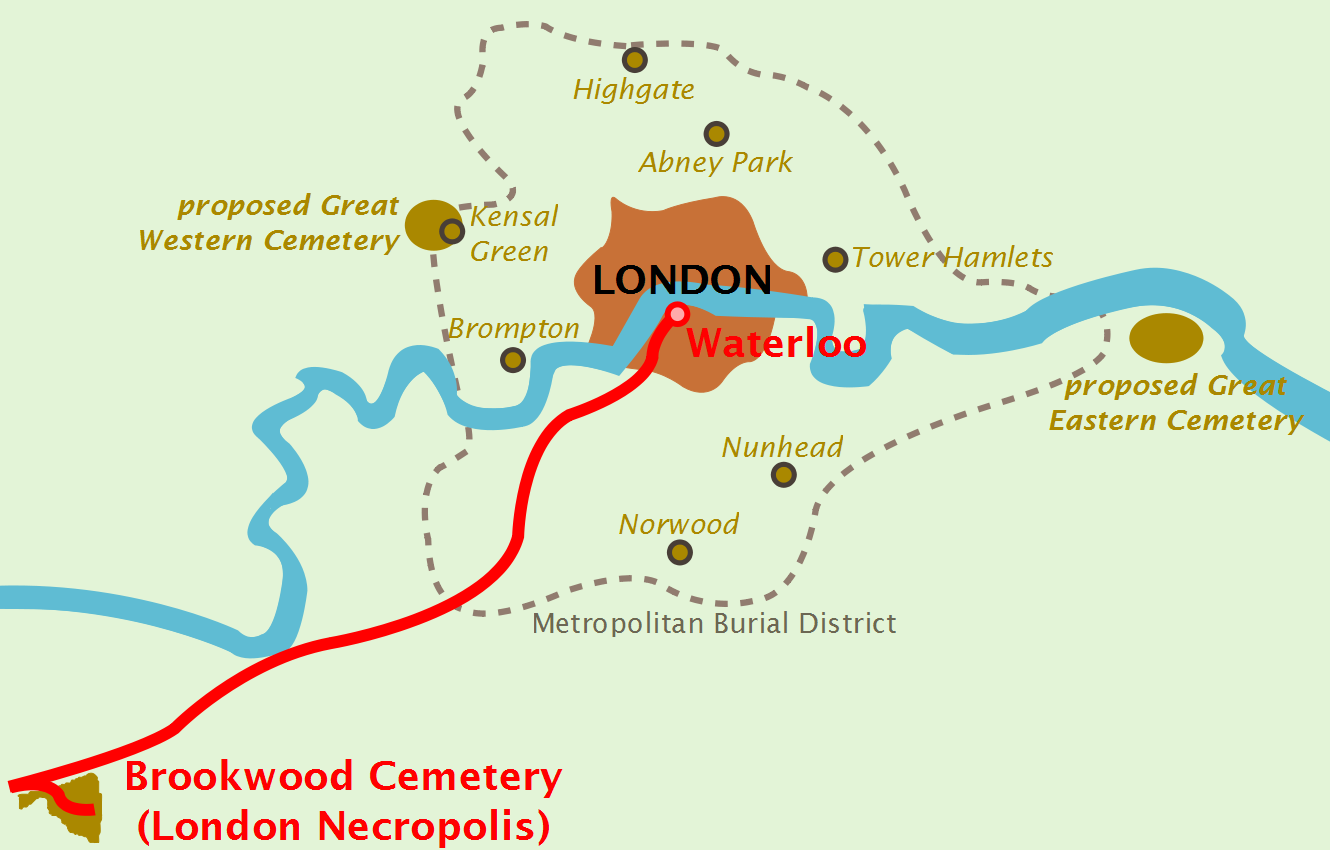
Proposed solutions to the burial crisis, 1852. A ring of new cemeteries had opened outside the built-up area of London, but were only a temporary solution. Edwin Chadwick planned two large new cemeteries just outside the boundaries of the Metropolitan Burial District, while the promoters of the Necropolis scheme planned a single large cemetery far enough from the metropolis so as never to be affected by urban growth, to be reached by railway. (Based on a map in Clarke (2004), p. 2)

In the wake of public concerns following the cholera epidemic and the findings of the royal commission, the Burial Act 1852 was passed. Under the Burial Act, new burials were prohibited in what were then the built-up areas of London. Seven large cemeteries had recently opened a short distance from London or were in the process of opening, and temporarily became London's main burial grounds. A proposal by Francis Seymour Haden to ship the bodies of London's dead to the Thames Estuary for use in land reclamation met with little approval, and the government sought alternative means to prevent the constantly increasing number of deaths in London from overwhelming the new cemeteries in the same manner in which it had overwhelmed the traditional burial grounds.

The new suburban cemeteries had a combined size of just 282 acres (0.44 sq mi; 1.1 km^{2}), and the Board of Health did not consider any of them suitable for long-term use. As a long-term solution to the crisis, Edwin Chadwick proposed the closure of all existing burial grounds in the vicinity of London other than the privately owned Kensal Green Cemetery in west London. Kensal Green Cemetery was to be nationalised and greatly enlarged to provide a single burial ground for west London. A large tract of land on the Thames around 9 miles (14 km) southeast of London in Abbey Wood (on the site of present-day Thamesmead) was to become a single burial ground for east London. All bodies would be shipped by river and canal to the new cemeteries, bringing an end to burials in London itself.

The Treasury was sceptical that Chadwick's scheme would ever be financially viable. It also met with widespread public concerns about the impact of monopoly control of the burial industry, and about the government taking control of an industry previously controlled by religious bodies and private entrepreneurs. The process of decomposition was still poorly understood and it was generally believed that 12/13 (92%) of a decaying corpse is dispersed as gas; local authorities in the vicinity of the proposed new cemeteries were horrified at the prospect of an estimated 3,000,000 cubic feet (85,000 m^{3}) per year of miasma (disease-carrying vapour) spreading from the cemeteries across surrounding areas. Although the Metropolitan Interments Act 1850 authorised Chadwick's scheme to proceed, section 1 of the Burial Act 1852 repealed the authorisation.

== Richard Broun and Richard Sprye ==
An area of ground so distant as to be beyond any possible future extension of the Capital, sufficiently large to allow of its sub-division, not only into spacious distinct portions for the burial of each sect of the Christian Public, but also, if desired and deemed expedient, into as many separate compartments as there are parishes within London and its suburbs ... [and] a Mausoleum Church, with funeral chapels, private mausolea, vaults, and catacombs, large enough to contain, not only the thousands of coffins now lying within our numerous Metropolitan Churches, but also the coffins of all such dying in London, in this and future generations ... [A] grand and befitting gathering place for the metropolitan mortality of a mighty nation; a last home and bed of rest where the ashes of the high and low, the mighty and the weak, the learned and the ignorant, the wicked and the good, the idle and the industrious, in one vast co-mingled heap may repose together.

— Sir Richard Broun, 1851 (Note: Unlike many other European cities, London burials did not typically separate persons of different social classes, as rich and poor alike would generally be buried in their local parish graveyard. The only significant social distinction was between those interred within the church and those buried in the graveyard.)

While the negotiations over the state taking control of burials were ongoing, an alternative proposal was being drawn up by Richard Broun and Richard Sprye. (Note: Sir Richard Broun (1801–1858) was an entrepreneur and author, and heir to the Broun Baronetcy of the Baronetage of Nova Scotia. As well as being the creator of the London Necropolis scheme, he is best remembered as one of those behind the resurrection of the Venerable Order of Saint John, as the promoter of an early scheme for a transcontinental route across what is now Canada to improve trade links between Europe and Asia, and for a campaign for special privileges to be granted to baronets. He was parodied as Sir Vavasour Firebrace in Benjamin Disraeli's novel Sybil. Little is recorded of Richard Sprye; early LNC documents simply describe him as a "gentleman" living in Great George Street, Westminster.) Broun and Sprye intended to use the emerging technology of mechanised land transport to provide a final solution to the problem of London's dead. They envisaged buying a single very large tract of land around 23 miles (37 km) from London in Brookwood near Woking, Surrey, to be called Brookwood Cemetery or the London Necropolis. At this distance, the land would be far beyond the maximum projected size of the city's growth, greatly reducing any potential hazards from miasma. In the 18th century this land had been nicknamed "the Waste of Woking", and with poor quality gravel soil it was of little use in farming and thus available very cheaply. The London and South Western Railway (LSWR)—which had connected London to Woking in 1838—would enable bodies and mourners to be shipped from London to the site easily and cheaply. Broun envisaged dedicated coffin trains, each carrying 50–60 bodies, travelling from London to the new Necropolis in the early morning or late at night, and the coffins being stored on the cemetery site until the time of the funeral. Mourners would then be carried to the appropriate part of the cemetery by a dedicated passenger train during the day.

Broun and Sprye's original Necropolis proposal. The existing railway line was to separate the main Anglican cemetery (foreground, with large chapel) and a wedge-shaped plot of land divided into 36 small cemeteries for the use of London's parish churches (immediately behind the main Anglican cemetery, parallel to the railway line) on the southern side of the railway from a number of smaller cemeteries on the northern side of the railway, connected by a long curving road, for the use of Roman Catholics and the Nonconformist churches. The waterway meandering through the northern cemetery is the Basingstoke Canal. Although this design was abandoned in favour of a single larger site south of the railway line and a new railway line to reach the more distant parts of the cemetery, the division into a northern unconsecrated and a southern Anglican cemetery was retained.

Broun calculated that a 1,500-acre (2.3 sq mi; 6.1 km^{2}) site would accommodate a total of 5,830,500 individual graves in a single layer. The legislation authorising Brookwood Cemetery did not permit mass graves at the site, and burials were restricted to one family per grave. If the practice of only burying a single family in each grave were abandoned and the traditional practice for pauper burials of ten burials per grave were adopted, the site was capable of accommodating 28,500,000 bodies. Assuming 50,000 deaths per year and presuming that families would often choose to share a grave, Broun calculated that even with the prohibition of mass graves it would take over 350 years to fill a single layer of the cemetery. Although the Brookwood site was a long distance from London, Broun and Sprye argued that the railway made it both quicker and cheaper to reach than the seven existing cemeteries, all of which required a slow and expensive horse-drawn hearse to carry the body and mourners from London to the burial site.

=== Opposition ===
Shareholders in the LSWR were concerned at the impact the cemetery scheme would have on the normal operations of the railway. At a shareholders' meeting in August 1852 concerns were raised about the impact of funeral trains on normal traffic and of the secrecy in which negotiations between the LSWR and the promoters of the cemetery were conducted. The LSWR management pledged that no concessions would be made to the cemetery operators, other than promising them the use of one train each day. Charles James Blomfield, Bishop of London was hostile in general to railway funeral schemes, arguing that the noise and speed of the railways was incompatible with the solemnity of the Christian burial service. Blomfield also considered it inappropriate that the families of people from very different backgrounds would potentially have to share a train, and felt that it demeaned the dignity of the deceased for the bodies of respectable members of the community to be carried on a train also carrying the bodies and relatives of those who had led immoral lives. (Note: Blomfield was speaking in 1842 about the use of railways to convey funeral parties in general, and not specifically criticising the Brookwood scheme. The designs of the LNC's stations and trains addressed his concerns by separating bodies and mourners from different faiths and social classes. By the 1850s Blomfield had become a supporter of the London Necropolis bill in Parliament.) Meanwhile, Henry Drummond, Member of Parliament for the West Surrey constituency which covered the Brookwood site, James Mangles, MP for the nearby constituency of Guildford, and labour reform campaigner Lord Ashley (later Lord Shaftesbury) lobbied against the proposal. Drummond considered the scheme a front for land speculation, believing that the promoters only intended to use 400 acres (0.63 sq mi; 1.6 km^{2}) for the cemetery and to develop the remaining 80% for building; (Note: Drummond's prediction ultimately proved accurate, as only 400 acres (0.63 sq mi; 1.6 km^{2}) of the site was used for a cemetery and the remainder was eventually sold for development, although the majority of the land was not sold for over 100 years.) Mangles felt that the people of Woking were not being fairly compensated for the loss of their historic rights to use the common lands; Ashley felt that the Metropolitan Interments Act 1850 had been a victory for the campaign to end private profiteering from death and that the new scheme would reverse these gains, and was also concerned about the health implications of diseased bodies being transported to and stored at the London terminus in large numbers while awaiting trains to Brookwood.

== Formation of the London Necropolis Company ==
London Necropolis and National Mausoleum Act 1852
- Act of Parliament
- Parliament of the United Kingdom
- Long title: An Act to incorporate the London Necropolis and National Mausoleum Company, and to enable such Company to establish a Cemetery in the Parish of Woking in the County of Surrey, and for other Purposes.
- Citation: 15 & 16 Vict. c. cxlix

Dates
- Royal assent: 30 June 1852

Text of statute as originally enacted

Despite the opposition, on 30 June 1852 the London Necropolis and National Mausoleum Act 1852 (15 & 16 Vict. c. cxlix) was passed, giving the Brookwood scheme parliamentary consent to proceed. The former Woking Common at Brookwood, owned by the Earl of Onslow, was chosen as the site for the new cemetery. To prevent the LSWR from exploiting its monopoly on access to the cemetery, the act of Parliament authorising the scheme bound the LSWR to carry corpses and mourners to the cemetery in perpetuity and set a maximum tariff which could be levied on funeral traffic, but did not specify details of how the funeral trains were to operate.

By this time, Broun and Sprye had lost control of the scheme. On 1 April 1851 a group of trustees led by Poor Law Commissioner William Voules purchased the rights to the scheme from Broun and Sprye for £20,000 (about £1.92 million in terms of 2025 consumer spending power) and, once the act of Parliament had been passed, founded the London Necropolis and National Mausoleum Company on their own without regard to their agreement with the original promoters. These trustees proved inept, wasting large sums of money; meanwhile Richard Broun lobbied vigorously against the "misrepresentations and ambiguous assertions" of the new trustees. With financiers sceptical of the scheme's viability Voules and his trustees were unable to raise the funds to buy the proposed site from Lord Onslow. In early 1853, amid widespread allegations of voting irregularities and with the company unable to pay promised dividends, a number of the directors resigned, including Voules, and the remaining public confidence in the scheme collapsed.

Broun's scheme had envisaged the cemetery running along both sides of the LSWR main line and divided by religion, with separate private railway halts on the main line, each incorporating a chapel, to serve each religion's section. The new consulting engineer to the company, William Cubitt, rejected this idea and recommended a single site to the south of the railway line, served by a private branch line through the cemetery. The company also considered Broun's plan for dedicated coffin trains unrealistic, arguing that relatives would not want the coffins to be shipped separately from the deceased's family.

== Brookwood Cemetery ==
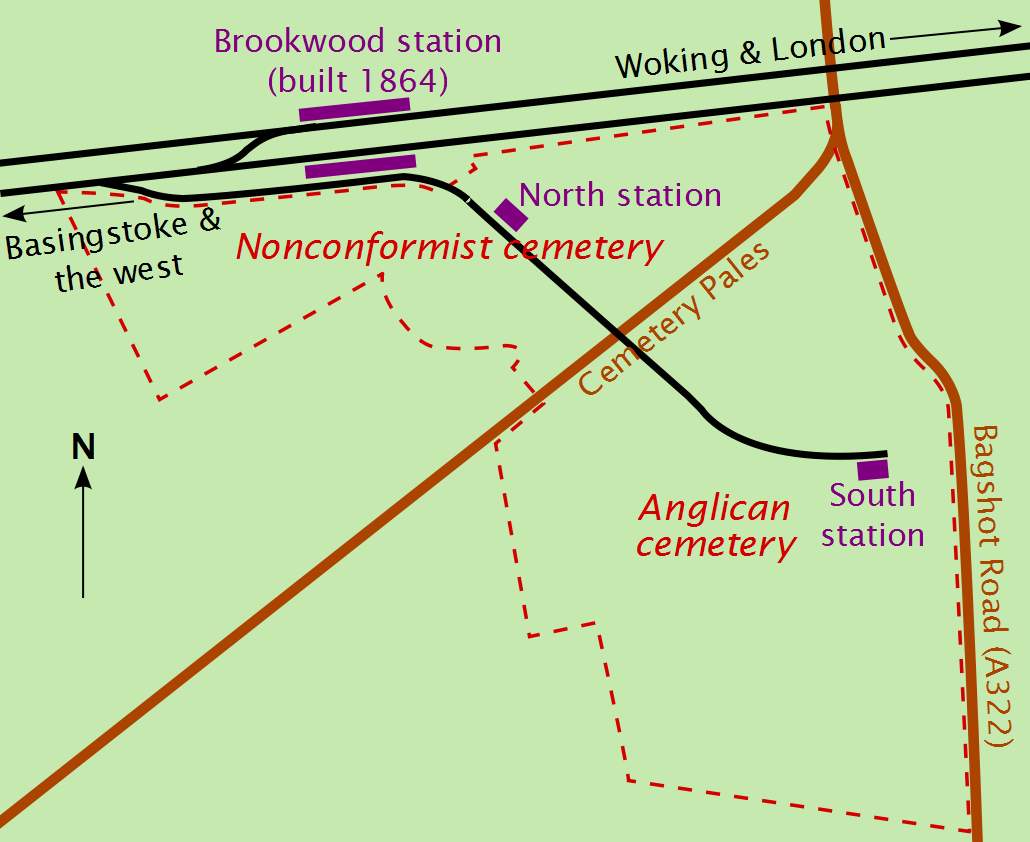
Layout of Brookwood Cemetery and the railway lines serving it at the time of its opening. (Based on a map in Clarke (2006), p. 14)

In September 1853 a committee of enquiry into the mismanagement of the company recommended the expulsion of the four remaining trustees and the reform of the company under a new board of directors. This was unanimously approved by the shareholders, and work finally began on the scheme. A 2,200-acre (3.4 sq mi; 8.9 km^{2}) tract of land stretching from Woking to Brookwood was purchased from Lord Onslow. The westernmost 400 acres (0.62 sq mi; 1.6 km^{2}), at the Brookwood end, were designated the initial cemetery site, and a branch railway line was built from the LSWR main line into this section. (Note: The western end of the site was chosen as the land was most suitable for use as a cemetery, and the terrain best suited for the railway line. It was also the section of the site best served by existing roads. The directors planned that if the initial cemetery was successful, the money raised would fund the drainage and redevelopment of the remaining 80% of the site to make it suitable for cemetery use and railway traffic.) A plot of land between Westminster Bridge Road and York Street (now Leake Street) was chosen as the site for the London railway terminus. Architect William Tite and engineer William Cubitt drew up a design for a station, which was approved in June 1854, and completed in October 1854. In July 1854 work began on the drainage of the marshlands designated as the initial cemetery site, and on the construction of the embankment carrying the railway branch into the cemetery. (Note: The dates of drainage have been lost, but it is believed that only the Nonconformist cemetery had been drained at the time the cemetery opened, as the tender for draining the Anglican cemetery was not submitted until January 1855.)

With the ambition to become London's sole burial site in perpetuity, the LNC were aware that if their plans were successful, their Necropolis would become a site of major national importance. As a consequence, the cemetery was designed with attractiveness in mind, in contrast to the squalid and congested London burial grounds and the newer suburban cemeteries which were already becoming crowded. The LNC aimed to create an atmosphere of perpetual spring in the cemetery, and chose the plants for the cemetery accordingly. It had already been noted that evergreen plants from North America thrived in the local soil. Robert Donald, the owner of an arboretum near Woking, was contracted to supply the trees and shrubs for the cemetery. The railway line through the cemetery and the major roads and paths within the cemetery were lined with giant sequoia trees, the first significant planting of these trees (only introduced to Europe in 1853) in Britain. As well as the giant sequoias, the grounds were heavily planted with magnolia, rhododendron, coastal redwood, azalea, andromeda and monkeypuzzle, with the intention of creating perpetual greenery with large numbers of flowers and a strong floral scent throughout the cemetery. (Note: In later years the original planting of the cemetery was supplemented by numerous other tree species planted by the LNC, as well as many plants planted by mourners at burial sites and around mausolea. Between the end of LNC independence in 1959 and the cemetery's purchase by Ramadan Guney in 1985 cemetery maintenance was drastically reduced, and the spread of various plant types caused many of the non-military sections of the cemetery to revert to wilderness in this period.)

On 7 November 1854 the new cemetery opened and the southern Anglican section was consecrated by Charles Sumner, Bishop of Winchester. (Note: Traditional English burial practice was for graveyards and cemeteries to be divided into an Anglican south and a Nonconformist north. The tradition derived from churchyard burials, where Church of England burials were conducted in the sunny area south of the church, and the unbaptised and those who did not want to be buried in an Anglican ceremony were buried in the shadowed area north of the church.) At the time it was the largest cemetery in the world. On 13 November the first scheduled train left the new London Necropolis railway station for the cemetery, and the first burial (that of the stillborn twins of a Mr and Mrs Hore of Ewer Street, Borough) took place. (Note: The Hore twins, along with the other burials on the first day, were pauper funerals and buried in unmarked graves. The first burial at Brookwood with a permanent memorial was that of Lt. Gen. Sir Henry Goldfinch, buried on 25 November 1854, the 26th person to be buried in the cemetery. The first permanent memorial erected in the Nonconformist cemetery was that of Charles Milligan Hogg, son of botanist Robert Hogg, buried on 12 December 1854. Goldfinch and Hogg's graves are not the oldest monuments in the cemetery, as on occasion gravestones were relocated and re-erected during the relocation of existing burial grounds to Brookwood.)

A very few years ago, the idea of founding a cemetery for the metropolis which should be more than 20 miles distant from it would have been looked upon as an absurdity. Yesterday, however, saw the practical embodiment of this idea ... A short distance beyond the Woking station, the country, without varying from its general character of sterility and hardness of outline, becomes gently undulating and offers features which, with some assistance from art, might be made more than pleasing. Here is the London Necropolis, which certainly throws into the shade any previous attempts at extramural interments.

It was fitting enough that the largest city in the world should have, as it will now have, the largest cemetery in the world.

— The Times, 8 November 1854

== Cemetery railway line ==
As the Brookwood site had been intentionally chosen for its distance from London, at the time of its opening the only practical way to reach the cemetery was by railway. William Cubitt decided the terrain of the initial cemetery site was best suited to a railway branch from the LSWR at the west of the cemetery, and work began on the earthworks and rails for the new branch in early September 1854. The single-track branch was completed in time for the opening two months later. The junction with the LSWR, known as Necropolis Junction, was west-facing, meaning that trains to and from London were obliged to reverse in and out of the branch to the two stations in the cemetery. The poor quality gravel soil, which had been the initial reason for the site's cheapness and its selection as the site for the cemetery, was poorly suited as a railway trackbed. The rails, and in particular the sleepers, deteriorated rapidly and needed constantly to be replaced.

=== London rail stations ===
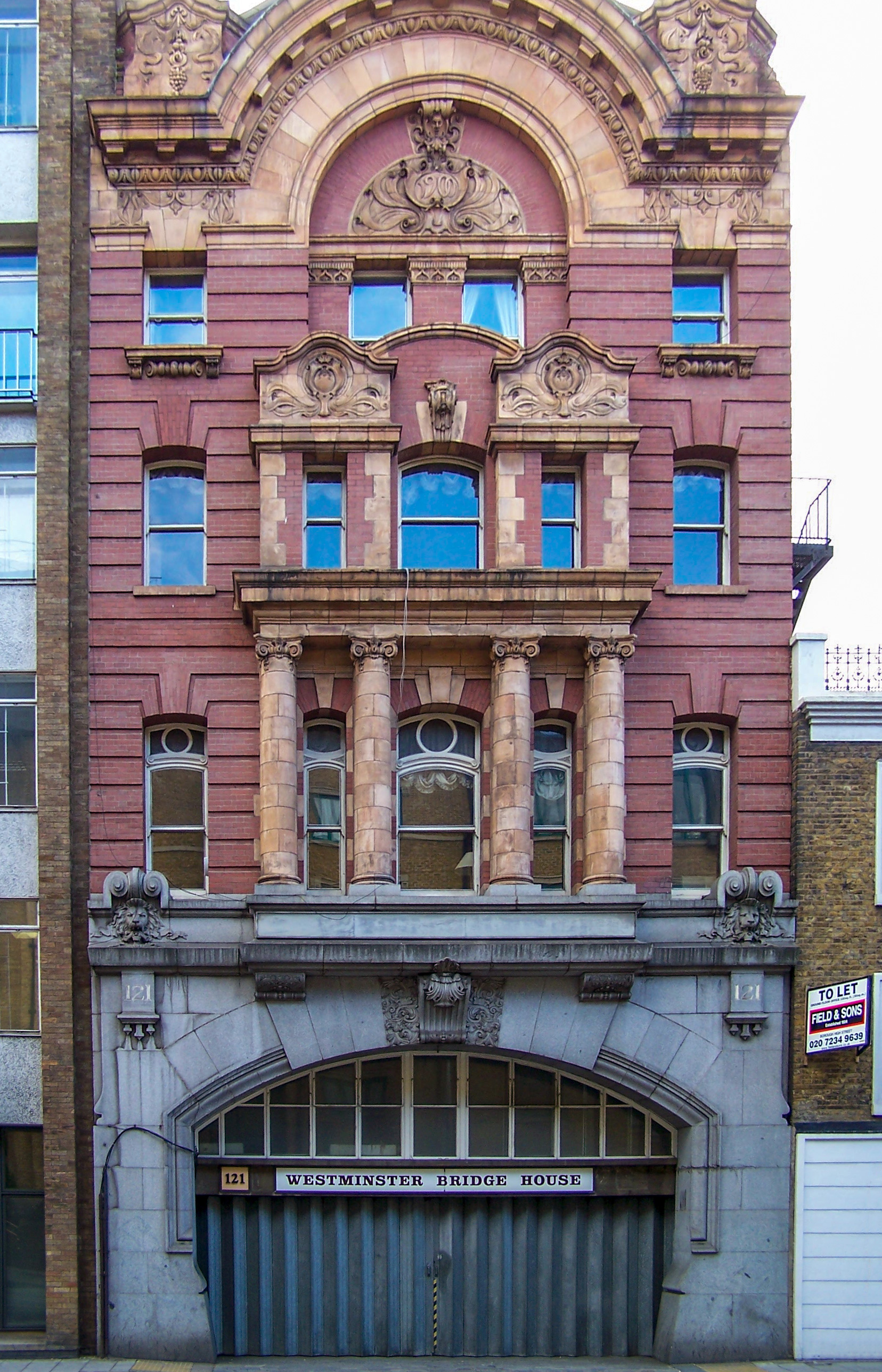
The Westminster Bridge Road offices of the LNC and the first class entrance to the second London terminus, opened in 1902.

A site for the London terminus near Waterloo had been suggested by Richard Broun. Its proximity to the Thames meant that bodies could be cheaply transported to the terminus by water from much of London, while being situated near three major Thames bridges the area was easily accessed from both north and south of the river. The arches of the huge brick viaduct carrying the LSWR into Waterloo Bridge station (now London Waterloo station) were easily converted into mortuaries. Broun also felt that the journey out of London from Waterloo Bridge would be less distressing for mourners; while most of the rail routes out of London ran through tunnels and deep cuttings or through densely populated areas, at this time the urban development of what is now south London had not taken place and the LSWR route ran almost entirely through parkland and countryside. In March 1854 the LNC purchased a plot of land between Westminster Bridge Road and York Street (now Leake Street). Architect William Tite and engineer William Cubitt drew up a design for a station, which was approved in June 1854 and completed in October of that year.

As the station abutted the arches of the LSWR's viaduct, it acted as an obstacle to any increase in the number of lines serving Waterloo station (renamed from Waterloo Bridge station in 1886). Urban growth in the area of what is now south west London, through which trains from Waterloo ran, led to congestion at the station and in 1896 the LSWR formally presented the LNC with a proposal to provide the LNC with a new station in return for the existing station. The LNC agreed to the proposals, in return for the LSWR granting the LNC control of the design of the new station and leasing the new station to the LNC for a token rent in perpetuity, providing new rolling stock, removing any limit on the number of passengers using the Necropolis service, and providing the free carriage of machinery and equipment to be used in the cemetery. Although the LSWR was extremely unhappy at what they considered excessive demands, in May 1899 the companies signed an agreement, in which the LSWR gave in to every LNC demand. In addition the LSWR paid £12,000 compensation (about £1.33 million in terms of 2025 consumer spending power) for the inconvenience of relocating the LNC station and offices, and agreed that mourners returning from the cemetery could travel on any LSWR train to Waterloo, Vauxhall or Clapham Junction. A site for the replacement terminus was bought by the LSWR in 1899, south of the existing site and on the opposite side of Westminster Bridge Road. The new station was completed on 8 February 1902, and the LSWR viaduct was widened to serve a greatly enlarged Waterloo station, destroying all traces of the original LNC terminus.

=== Cemetery rail stations ===
The two stations in the cemetery were very similar in design. North station served the Nonconformist section of the cemetery, and South station served the Anglican section. On William Cubitt's advice the two stations in the cemetery were built as temporary structures, in the expectation that they would need to be rebuilt once the railway was operational and the issues with operating a railway of this unique nature became clearer. Other than brick platform faces, chimneys and foundations, the stations were built entirely of wood. Each station held first class and ordinary reception rooms for mourners, a first class and an ordinary refreshment room, and a set of apartments for LNC staff. To provide an attractive first view of the cemetery for visitors arriving at the stations, the areas around the stations and their associated chapels were planted with groves of bay, Cedar of Lebanon, rhododendron and Portuguese laurel.

At the time the cemetery opened, the nearest railway station other than those on the cemetery branch was Woking railway station, 4 miles (6.4 km) away. As only one train per day ran from London to the cemetery stations and back, and even that ran only when funerals were due to take place, access to the cemetery was difficult for mourners and LNC staff. Although in the negotiations leading to the creation of the cemetery the LSWR had told the LNC that they planned to build a main line station near the cemetery, they had not done so. On 1 June 1864 the LSWR finally opened Brookwood railway station on their main line, immediately adjacent to the cemetery. A substantial commuter village grew around the northern (i.e. non-cemetery) side of the new station.

== Burials ==
As the corpses brought to either of the reception-houses by the funeral tender are now taken each one its separate way, followed by its mourning-group, and by paths where privacy is unbroken, and none but soothing and religious influences around,—when amidst this scene, the clergyman or minister, unharassed by other duties, reads reverently the prayers for the dead,—when all which is this taking place tends to raise the dignity and self-respect of human nature, and create a sublime ideal of the great mystery of the grave, we perceive by contrast, more and more, what the evils of city and suburban burials have been, and what an educative process lies within even this portional one of their reformation ...

Hither the wealthy and respectable are removing the remains of relatives from the graves and vaults of the metropolis, and hither the Nonconformists are bringing the long-interred dead from even the once-sacred place of Bunhill Fields ... but it is a law that moral and social advantages permeate as surely down through the strata of society as water finds its level. In spite of little knowledge, in spite of ignorant opposition from those interested in a different state of things, the middle and working classes of the metropolis will not be slow in perceiving the advantages of extramural burial, conjointly with a management that frees them from extortion ...

To merely provide decency of sepulchre was not, and is not, all. [The LNC] perceived that if it was to work out with any efficiency the problem of extramural burial, it must be its own undertaker, and provide a reception-house, as well as railway transit. This it has done accordingly.

— The Illustrated London News on the London Necropolis Company in April 1856, a year and a half after Brookwood Cemetery's opening

The London Necropolis Company offered three classes of funerals:

- A first class funeral allowed its buyer to select the grave site of their choice anywhere in the cemetery; (Note: The LNC charged extra for burials in some designated special sites in the cemetery.) at the time of opening prices began at £2 10s (about £240 in 2025 terms) for a basic 9-by-4-foot (2.7 m × 1.2 m) with no special coffin specifications. It was expected by the LNC that those using first class graves would erect a permanent memorial of some kind in due course following the funeral.
- Second class funerals cost £1 (about £96 in 2025 terms) and allowed some control over the burial location. The right to erect a permanent memorial cost an additional 10 shillings (about £48 in 2025 terms); if a permanent memorial was not erected the LNC reserved the right to re-use the grave in future.
- Third class funerals were reserved for pauper funerals; those buried at parish expense in the section of the cemetery designated for that parish. Although the LNC was forbidden from using mass graves (other than the burial of next of kin in the same grave) and thus even the lowest class of funeral provided a separate grave for the deceased, third class funerals were not granted the right to erect a permanent memorial on the site. (The families of those buried could pay afterwards to upgrade a third class grave to a higher class if they later wanted to erect a memorial, but this practice was rare.) Despite this, Brookwood's pauper graves granted more dignity to the deceased than did other graveyards and cemeteries of the period, all of which other than Brookwood continued the practice of mass graves for the poor.

Brookwood was one of the few cemeteries to permit burials on Sundays, which made it a popular choice with the poor as it allowed people to attend funerals without the need to take a day off work. As theatrical performances were banned on Sundays at this time, it also made Brookwood a popular choice for the burial of actors for the same reason, to the extent that actors were provided with a dedicated section of the cemetery near the station entrance.

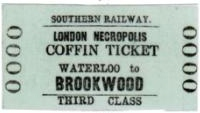
Third class coffin ticket, issued between April–September 1925.

While the majority of burials conducted by the LNC (around 80%) were pauper funerals on behalf of London parishes, the LNC also reached agreement with a number of societies, guilds, religious bodies and similar organisations. The LNC provided dedicated sections of the cemetery for these groups, on the basis that those who had lived or worked together in life could remain together after death. Although the LNC was never able to gain the domination of London's funeral industry for which its founders had hoped, it was very successful at targeting specialist groups of artisans and trades, to the extent that it became nicknamed "the Westminster Abbey of the middle classes". A large number of these dedicated plots were established, ranging from Chelsea Pensioners and the Ancient Order of Foresters to the Corps of Commissionaires and the LSWR. The Nonconformist cemetery also includes a Parsee burial ground established in 1862, which as of 2011 remains the only Zoroastrian burial ground in Europe. Dedicated sections in the Anglican cemetery were also reserved for burials from those parishes which had made burial arrangements with the LNC.

Immediately after its foundation the LNC used existing firms of London undertakers to arrange funerals, but over time took over all aspects of the arrangements from coffin-making to masonry. LNC funerals were intentionally kept as similar as possible to those of traditional undertakers, with the exception that a railway carriage was used in place of a hearse. On being commissioned to provide a funeral, invitations would be sent out either by the deceased's family or from the LNC offices. These letters specified the waiting room to be used, the time of the train to Brookwood, and the expected return time to London. If the funeral was to be held in London, a traditional hearse and carriage would take the deceased to their parish church for the service, and then on to the London railway terminus; if the funeral was to take place in the terminus or in Brookwood, the procession would come directly to the terminus.

=== Funerals ===
On arrival at the terminus the mourners would be led either to one of the dedicated first class waiting rooms (for first and second class funerals) or to the communal third class waiting room. (Note: For those third class funerals paid for by the parish, two third class tickets would be provided at the parish's expense (one ticket in the case of a child's death). Further mourners for third class funerals were obliged to pay for their own tickets to the Necropolis. The LNC's trains were capable of transporting large numbers of mourners when required; the funeral of businessman Nowroji Saklatwala on 25 July 1938 saw 155 mourners travelling first class on a dedicated LNC train. For extremely large funerals such as those of major public figures, the LSWR would provide additional trains from Waterloo to Brookwood station on the main line to meet the demand.) The coffin would be discreetly unloaded from the hearse and sent to the platform level by lift. Those attending first and second class funerals would be permitted to watch the coffins being loaded onto the train if they so wished. (After the relocation to the new London terminus in 1902, some funeral services would be held in a Chapelle Ardente on platform level, for those cases where mourners were unable to make the journey to Brookwood.) Each door of the waiting train would be labelled with the name of the deceased, to ensure all passengers travelled with the correct funeral party; the names of the deceased being carried on the train would be called in turn, and that person's mourners would board the train.

At the time the service was inaugurated, the LNC's trains were divided both by class and by religion, with separate Anglican and Nonconformist sections of the train. This distinction applied to both living and deceased passengers. Intended to prevent persons from different social background from mixing and potentially distressing mourners and to prevent bodies of persons from different social classes being carried in the same compartment rather than to provide different facilities, the carriages intended for all classes and religions were very similar in design, and the primary difference was different ornamentation on the compartment doors.

At 11.35 am (11.20 am on Sundays) the train would leave London for Brookwood, arriving at Necropolis Junction at 12.25 pm (12.20 pm on Sundays). (Note: Although these departure times varied slightly, over the 87 years of London Necropolis Railway operations they never deviated by more than 20 minutes.)

North station in 1907

On arrival at North or South station coffins would usually be unloaded onto a hand-drawn bier and pulled by LNC staff to the appropriate chapel. While this was taking place the mourners were escorted to the waiting rooms at the station. On arrival at the chapels first and second class funerals would generally have a brief service (third class funerals had a single service in the appropriate chapel for all those being buried). For those burials where the funeral service had already been held at either a parish church or the LNC's London terminus the coffins would be taken directly from the train to the grave.

The return trains to London generally left South station at 2.15 pm and Necropolis Junction at 2.30 pm; the return journey initially took around an hour owing to the need to stop to refill the engine with water, but following the construction of the water tower in the cemetery this fell to around 40 minutes. An 1854 agreement between the LNC and LSWR gave consent for the LNC to operate two or three funeral trains each day if demand warranted it, but traffic levels never rose to a sufficient level to activate this clause.

The train ran only if there was a coffin or passengers at the London terminus waiting to use it, and both the journey from London to Brookwood and the later return would be cancelled if nobody was due to leave London that morning. It would not run if there was only a single third or second class coffin to be carried, and in these cases the coffin and funeral party would be held until the next service. Generally the trains ran direct from London to the cemetery, other than occasional stops to take on water. Between 1890 and 1910 the trains also sometimes stopped at Vauxhall and Clapham Junction for the benefit of mourners from south west London who did not want to travel via Waterloo, but these intermediate stops were discontinued and never reinstated. After 1 October 1900 the Sunday trains were discontinued, and from 1902 the daily train service was ended and trains ran only as required. On some occasions where there were very large numbers of mourners the LSWR would provide special passenger trains from Waterloo to their own station at Brookwood to carry additional mourners to the vicinity of the cemetery.

As well as intending to conduct those burials which would previously have taken place in London's now-closed graveyards, the LNC also envisaged the physical relocation of the closed burial grounds to their Necropolis, to provide a final solution to the problems caused by burials in built-up areas. The massive London civil engineering projects of the mid-19th century—the railways, the sewer system and from the 1860s the precursors to the London Underground—often necessitated the demolition of existing churchyards. The first major relocation took place in 1862, when the construction of Charing Cross railway station and the routes into it necessitated the demolition of the burial ground of Cure's College in Southwark. Around 5,000 cubic yards (3,800 m^{3}) of earth was displaced, uncovering at least 7,950 bodies. These were packed into 220 large containers, each containing 26 adults plus children, and shipped on the London Necropolis Railway to Brookwood for reburial, along with at least some of the existing headstones from the cemetery, at a cost of around 3 shillings per body. At least 21 London burial grounds were relocated to Brookwood via the railway, along with numerous others relocated by road following the railway's closure. The LNC's exhumation and relocation business, split from the LNC in 1973 and renamed "Necropolis", continued to operate until 2002.

== Developments and difficulties ==
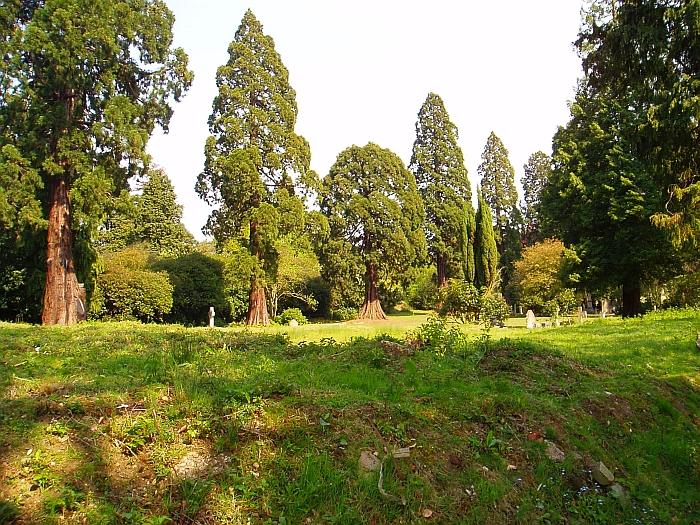
Around 80% of burials were of paupers, few of which are marked by monuments.

The success of the LNC relied on taking over all, or at least a significant portion, of the burials of London's dead. However, while the Metropolitan Interment Amendment Act 1852 had repealed Chadwick's scheme for two very large cemeteries near London, it had also permitted London's parishes to make their own arrangements for the burial of their dead. Each parish could make arrangements with the cemetery of its choosing, or use money from the rates to create their own cemeteries. The financial mismanagement and internal disputes within the LNC had delayed the opening of Brookwood Cemetery by 18 months, and during this period new cemeteries nearer London had opened or were nearing completion. While some parishes did choose Brookwood as their burial site, many preferred either to make arrangements with less distant cemeteries, or to buy land on the outskirts of London and open their own suburban cemeteries. Concerns over the financial irregularities and the viability of the scheme had led to only 15,000 of the 25,000 LNC shares being sold, severely limiting the company's working capital and forcing it to take out large loans. Buying the land from Lord Onslow, compensating local residents for the loss of rights over Woking Common, draining and landscaping the portion to be used for the initial cemetery, and building the railway lines and stations were all expensive undertakings. With far fewer burial contracts with London parishes than had been anticipated, by the time Brookwood Cemetery opened in November 1854 the LNC was on the verge of bankruptcy.

London Necropolis and National Mausoleum Amendment Act 1855
- Act of Parliament
- Parliament of the United Kingdom
- Long title: An Act to amend "The London Necropolis and National Mausoleum Act, 1852," and for other Purposes.
- Citation: 18 & 19 Vict. c. clxiii

Dates
- Royal assent: 23 July 1855

Text of statute as originally enacted

Recognising their financial predicament, the LNC lobbied Parliament for a new act of Parliament to allow the venture to survive. On 23 July 1855 the London Necropolis and National Mausoleum Amendment Act 1855 (18 & 19 Vict. c. clxiii) received royal assent. This act released the LNC from those compulsory purchases of land which had been mandated by the 1852 act but had not yet been completed, easing the immediate financial burden. It also allowed a ten-year window for the LNC to sell certain parts of the land bought from Lord Onslow which were not required for the cemetery, to provide a source of income.

Although the 1855 act permitted the LNC to sell land, this proved difficult. Of the 2,200-acre (3.4 sq mi; 8.9 km^{2}) site, around 700 acres (1.1 sq mi; 2.8 km^{2}) were occupied by the initial Necropolis site and the adjacent reserve site, and a further 200 acres (0.31 sq mi; 0.81 km^{2}) retained their common land rights and could not be developed in any way, rendering them worthless to prospective buyers. While this left 1,300 acres (2.0 sq mi; 5.3 km^{2}) theoretically able to be sold, the Brookwood site had been chosen for its remoteness and there were few prospective buyers. While 214 acres (0.33 sq mi; 0.87 km^{2}) were bought by the government as sites for prisons and a lunatic asylum, the LNC struggled to sell the remainder. By the time the ten-year window for land sales expired in 1865, only 346 acres (0.54 sq mi; 1.4 km^{2}) had been sold.

London Necropolis and National Mausoleum Act 1869
- Act of Parliament
- Parliament of the United Kingdom
- Long title: An Act to amend the Acts relating to the London Necropolis and National Mausoleum Company; and for other purposes.
- Citation: 32 & 33 Vict. c. iii

Dates
- Royal assent: 13 May 1869

Text of statute as originally enacted

With the majority of the surplus lands still unsold, as the ten-year window expired the LNC successfully petitioned for a further five-year extension. The LNC was by this time in serious financial difficulties, and dependent on loans from its own directors to settle outstanding debts. The business had been established on the basis that the cemetery would handle between 10,000 and 50,000 burials per year, but the number never exceeded 4,100 and over its first 20 years of operations averaged just 3,200. As the five-year extension expired the financial difficulties remained, and under pressure from shareholders the London Necropolis and National Mausoleum Act 1869 (32 & 33 Vict. c. iii) was passed. This removed all restrictions on land sales, other than within the existing cemetery and the adjacent reserve site. Despite the releasing of restrictions in the 1869 act, land sales remained disappointing. By 1887 less than half the surplus land had been sold, much of it at very low prices.

=== Cremation ===
In 1878 the Cremation Society of Great Britain bought an isolated piece of the LNC's Brookwood land and built Woking Crematorium on the site. (Note: A third party bought the land from the LNC and immediately sold it on to the Cremation Society. The relevant records have been lost, and it is not known whether this was a deliberate effort by the LNC to prevent the public becoming aware that they were doing business with the controversial Cremation Society, or whether the company was genuinely unaware of the purpose for which the land would be used. Julian Larkman, the LNC's secretary at the time of the sale, claimed that the company believed the land was to be used for a hospital.) The crematorium was completed in 1879 but Richard Cross, the Home Secretary, bowed to strong protests from local residents and threatened to prosecute if any cremations were conducted. As a consequence the crematorium was not used other than for the experimental incineration of livestock. The 1884 trial of William Price established that human cremation was not unlawful in England, and on 26 March 1885 the first human cremation took place at Woking. (Note: Dr William Price, an 83-year-old self-proclaimed druid, believed that burying the dead polluted the land. Consequently, following the death of his five-month-old son Jesu Grist (Jesus Christ) he attempted to perform a makeshift cremation by soaking the body in petrol, placing it in a barrel, and setting the barrel alight. This took place on a hilltop near a busy road in Llantrisant, and local residents witnessing the cremation called the police who extinguished the flames, retrieved the body and arrested Price. The judge in the case, Mr Justice Stephen, freed Price, ruling that as cremation had never formally been forbidden in English law it was permissible in England and Wales provided no public nuisance was caused. While a bill to formally legalise and regulate cremation was heavily defeated in Parliament shortly afterwards, the precedent of the Price case allowed Woking Crematorium to conduct human cremations without fear of prosecution despite the Home Secretary's threats to do so.) Although the LNC was hostile to the idea of cremation, Woking Crematorium was the only operational crematorium in the country. (Note: Crematoria opened in Manchester in 1892 and in Liverpool in 1896, but both were too far from London to be used for London funerals. Golders Green Crematorium, the first crematorium near London, opened in 1902.) Since the Necropolis Railway provided the easiest way to transport bodies and mourners from London to the Woking area, transport to and from Woking Crematorium soon began to provide a significant source of revenue for the LNC. (Note: The legalisation of cremation had obvious implications for a business reliant on burials for income, as well as the potential loss of goodwill of Woking residents who were extremely hostile to the crematorium when it opened. As an alternative, in early 1876 the LNC patented the "Earth-to-Earth coffin", a pioneering form of natural burial specifically designed to decay as rapidly as possible in Brookwood's soil. The LNC released the patent rights into the public domain in an effort to encourage people to choose burial at Brookwood over cremation.)

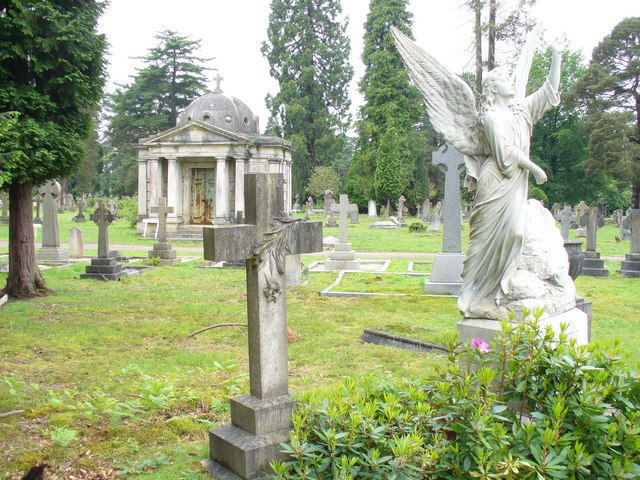
Brookwood Columbarium, built as a mausoleum for Lord Cadogan but converted in 1910 for the storage of cremation urns.

Cremation remained unusual and very expensive; the cost of a cremation at Woking was £6, not including transport and funeral costs, more than twice the £2 10s cost of a first class burial at Brookwood. By 1891 only 177 people had been cremated at Woking. Cyril Tubbs recognised that a potential increase in cremations once the practice became accepted represented an opportunity for the LNC. In July 1891 he proposed that the LNC build its own crematorium and columbarium (building for the storage of cremated remains) within the cemetery, with the ultimate goal of taking over all funeral arrangements for the Cremation Society. The Cremation Society were keen to prevent a competitor to Woking Crematorium, and sought to cooperate with the LNC. The fares for the transport of mourners and coffins on the London Necropolis Railway had been fixed by Parliament in 1852 at 6s for a living first class passenger and £1 for a first class coffin (in 1891 worth about £33 and £110 respectively in 2025 consumer terms). Rival firms of undertakers were not permitted to use the LNC's trains to Brookwood Cemetery and had to pay the much more expensive LSWR fares to transport coffins and mourners from Waterloo to Woking, giving the LNC a significant advantage in carriage to the crematorium. While the LNC never built its own crematorium, in 1910 Lord Cadogan decided he no longer wanted to be interred in the mausoleum he had commissioned at Brookwood. This building, the largest mausoleum in the cemetery, was bought by the LNC, fitted with shelves and niches to hold urns, and used as a dedicated columbarium from then on.

=== Cyril Tubbs ===
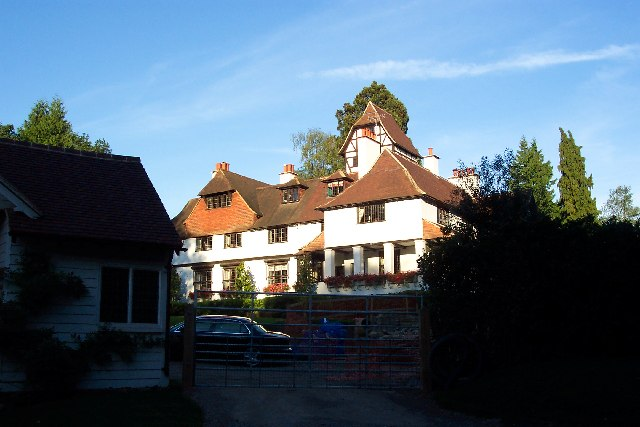
As they were unable to find an agent for the sale of their surplus land at Hook Heath, the LNC themselves developed the area into a prosperous suburb of large detached houses.

In December 1887 the LNC appointed Cyril Tubbs to supervise the LNC estate. Tubbs was given a broad remit to "advance the company's interests", including buying and selling land, supervising the railway stations, advertising the cemetery and liaising with the LSWR. Tubbs set about restructuring the design of Brookwood Cemetery to make it more appealing to mourners and visitors. The cemetery was divided into numbered sections, separated by an expanded network of avenues. These avenues were all named, and signposts were erected along them, to allow visitors easily to find their way around the sprawling Brookwood site, and to locate particular graves; the naming and numbering system devised by Tubbs has remained in use ever since.

Tubbs established a masonry works and showroom near the centre of the cemetery, allowing the LNC to provide grave markers without the difficulty of shipping them from London, and opened a LNC-owned nursery in the grounds for the sale of plants and wreaths. This increased the practice of mourners planting flowers and shrubs around graves, which was in turn used by the LNC in their promotional material to promote Brookwood as a "Garden of Sleep". In around 1904 the masonry works was expanded and equipped with a siding from the railway branch line, allowing the LNC to sell its gravestones and funerary art to cemeteries nationwide.

Tubbs also oversaw a restructuring of the ailing programme to sell the LNC's surplus lands. The estate was partitioned into three sections, and separate estate agents appointed to oversee the disposal of each. Many of the lands near Woking railway station and around Brookwood were sold, at much higher prices than the LNC disposals had previously fetched. No suitable agent could be found to oversee the sale of the third portion of LNC land, Hook Heath, and as a consequence Tubbs kept it under LNC control and oversaw its development himself. Over the 1890s the site was subdivided into plots for large detached houses, and a golf course was built to attract residents and visitors. (Note: The LNC earned additional revenue from golfers disguised as mourners taking advantage of the Necropolis Railway's fixed cheap fares to travel from London to the golf course, a practice which was tacitly accepted by the LNC. How the golfers concealed their equipment while travelling is not recorded.)

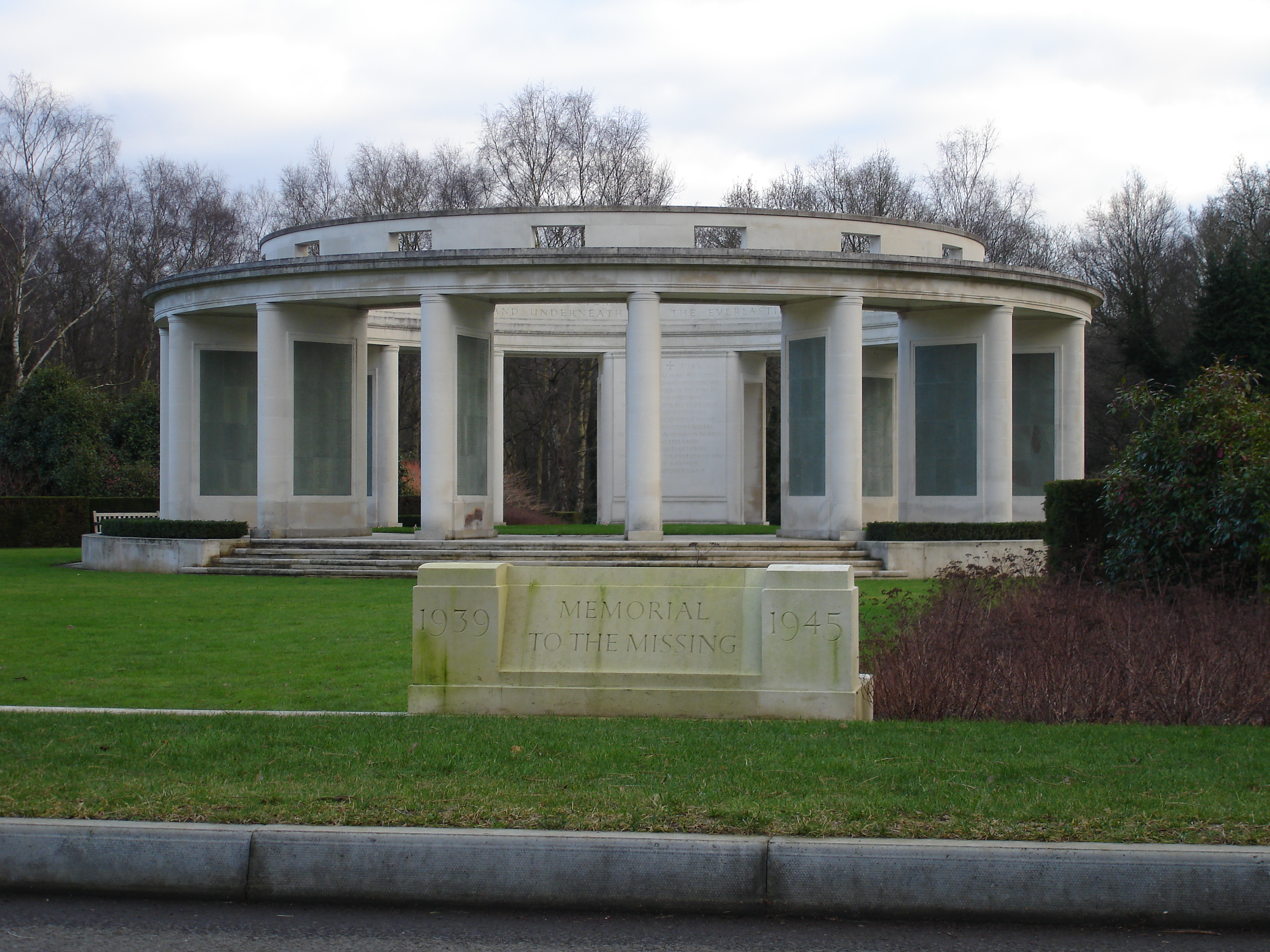
The Brookwood Memorial, unveiled by Queen Elizabeth II in the final months of LNC independence, is considered one of the most important war memorials in the UK.

In August 1914, on the outbreak of the First World War, the LNC offered to donate to the War Office 1 acre (4,000 m^{2}) of land "for the free interment of soldiers and sailors who have returned from the front wounded and may subsequently die". The offer was not taken up until 1917, when a section of the cemetery was set aside as Brookwood Military Cemetery, used for the burials of service personnel who died in the London District. In 1921 this area was sold to the Imperial War Graves Commission (later the Commonwealth War Graves Commission), and since then the military cemeteries have been administered and maintained by the IWGC/CWGC and its equivalents for other nations whose military are buried there. In September 1922 the LNC sold an area adjacent to the Military Cemetery to the US government. The LNC was hired by the US government to landscape this area and build a chapel, creating the American Military Cemetery (later the Brookwood American Cemetery and Memorial), the only burial ground in Britain for US casualties of the First World War. Although built by the LNC, since 1923 the American Military Cemetery has been administered by the American Battle Monuments Commission. After the Second World War the military cemeteries were extended to include dedicated sections for many of the Allied nations, and in 1958 the Brookwood Memorial, commemorating 3,500 Commonwealth casualties of the Second World War with no known grave, was dedicated at the site. Between them, the military cemeteries occupy around 37 acres (150,000 m^{2}) of the site.

== Closure of the London Necropolis Railway ==
On 13 April 1927 Cyril Tubbs died, after almost 40 years as surveyor, general manager and later a director of the LNC. Shortly afterwards, during meetings of the LNC's shareholders on 16 June and 14 July 1927, the words "National Mausoleum" were formally dropped from the LNC's name, the company being officially renamed the London Necropolis Company. On 28 December 1927 George Barratt, who had worked for the LNC for 63 years and been Superintendent of Brookwood Cemetery for 41 years, also died. Although the number of burials was gradually declining, it remained relatively steady. However, by this time mechanical hearses had begun to affect the numbers of people using the London Necropolis Railway. Trains still ran to the cemetery when there was demand, but the service which had previously operated almost every day was now generally running only around twice a week. By now the trees planted by the LNC in its early years of operations were mature, and Brookwood Cemetery was becoming a tourist attraction in its own right, often featuring in excursion guides of the 1920s and 1930s.

During the Second World War Waterloo station and the nearby Thames bridges were a significant target for bombing, and there were several near-misses on the station during the London Blitz of 1940–41. Although there were several interruptions to the Necropolis train service owing to enemy action elsewhere on the line, the Necropolis station was undamaged during the early stages of the bombing campaign. During the night of 16–17 April 1941, in one of the last major air raids on London, this good fortune came to an end. As bombs repeatedly fell on the Waterloo area, the rolling stock parked in the Necropolis siding was burned, and the railway arch connecting the main line to the Necropolis terminus was badly damaged. Multiple incendiary devices and high explosive bombs struck the central section of the terminus building. While the LNC's office building and the station platforms survived, the central section of the station was reduced to rubble. (Note: Although the station was destroyed on the night of 16–17 April, the last train had run on 11 April.) On 11 May 1941 the station was officially declared closed. (Note: Some sources give an official closure date of 15 May. As the station building had been destroyed and the arches carrying the branch line into the station rendered unusable the previous month, the "closure date" is a technicality.)

The Southern Railway (SR), which had absorbed the LSWR in 1923, offered the LNC the temporary use of Waterloo station to allow the Necropolis Railway service to be continued, but refused to allow the LNC to continue to sell cheap tickets to visitors travelling to and from the cemetery stations other than those involved in a funeral that day, meaning those visiting the cemetery had little reason to choose the LNC's irregular and infrequent trains to the cemetery stations over the SR's fast and frequent services to Brookwood. The LNC attempted to negotiate a deal by which genuine mourners could still travel cheaply to the cemetery on the 11.57 am service to Brookwood (the SR service closest to the LNC's traditional departure time), but the SR management (themselves under severe financial pressure owing to wartime constraints and damage) refused to entertain any compromise. In September 1945, following the end of hostilities, the directors of the LNC met to consider whether to rebuild the terminus and reopen the London Necropolis Railway. Although the main line from Waterloo to Brookwood had remained in use throughout the war and was in good condition, the branch line from Brookwood into the cemetery had been almost unused since the destruction of the London terminus. With the soil of the cemetery causing the branch to deteriorate even when it had been in use and regularly maintained, the branch line was in extremely poor condition.

Although Richard Broun had calculated that over its first century of operations the cemetery would have seen around five million burials at a rate of 50,000 per year, at the time the last train ran on 11 April 1941 only 203,041 people had been buried at Brookwood in almost 87 years of operations. Increased use of motorised road transport had damaged the profitability of the railway for the LNC, and faced with the costs of rebuilding the cemetery branch line, building a new London terminus and replacing the rolling stock damaged or destroyed in the air raid, the directors concluded that "past experience and present changed conditions made the running of the Necropolis private train obsolete". In mid-1946 the LNC formally informed the SR that the Westminster Bridge Road terminus would not be reopened.

The decision prompted complicated negotiations with the SR over the future of the LNC facilities in London. In December 1946 the directors of the two companies finally reached agreement. The railway-related portions of the LNC site (the waiting rooms, the caretaker's flat and the platforms themselves) would pass into the direct ownership of the SR, while the remaining surviving portions of the site (the office block on Westminster Bridge Road, the driveway and the ruined central portion of the site) would pass to the LNC to use or dispose of as they saw fit. The LNC sold the site to the British Humane Association in May 1947 for £21,000 (about £710,000 in terms of 2025 consumer spending power), and the offices of the LNC were transferred to the Superintendent's Office at Brookwood. (Note: Although LNC operations were transferred to Brookwood, the LNC leased a building at 123 Westminster Bridge Road from the Southern Railway to serve as a London office. This building also served as the registered premises of the company.) The SR continued to use the surviving sections of the track as occasional sidings into the 1950s, before clearing what remained of their section of the site.

While most of the LNC's business was now operated by road, an agreement on 13 May 1946 allowed the LNC to make use of SR services from Waterloo to Brookwood station for funerals, subject to the condition that should the service be heavily used the SR (British Railways after 1948) reserved the right to restrict the number of funeral parties on any given train. Although one of the LNC's hearse carriages had survived the bombing it is unlikely that this was ever used, and coffins were carried in the luggage space of the SR's coaches. Coffins would either be shipped to Brookwood ahead of the funeral party and transported by road to one of the mortuaries at the disused cemetery stations, or travel on the same SR train as the funeral party to Brookwood and be transported from Brookwood station to the burial site or chapel by road.

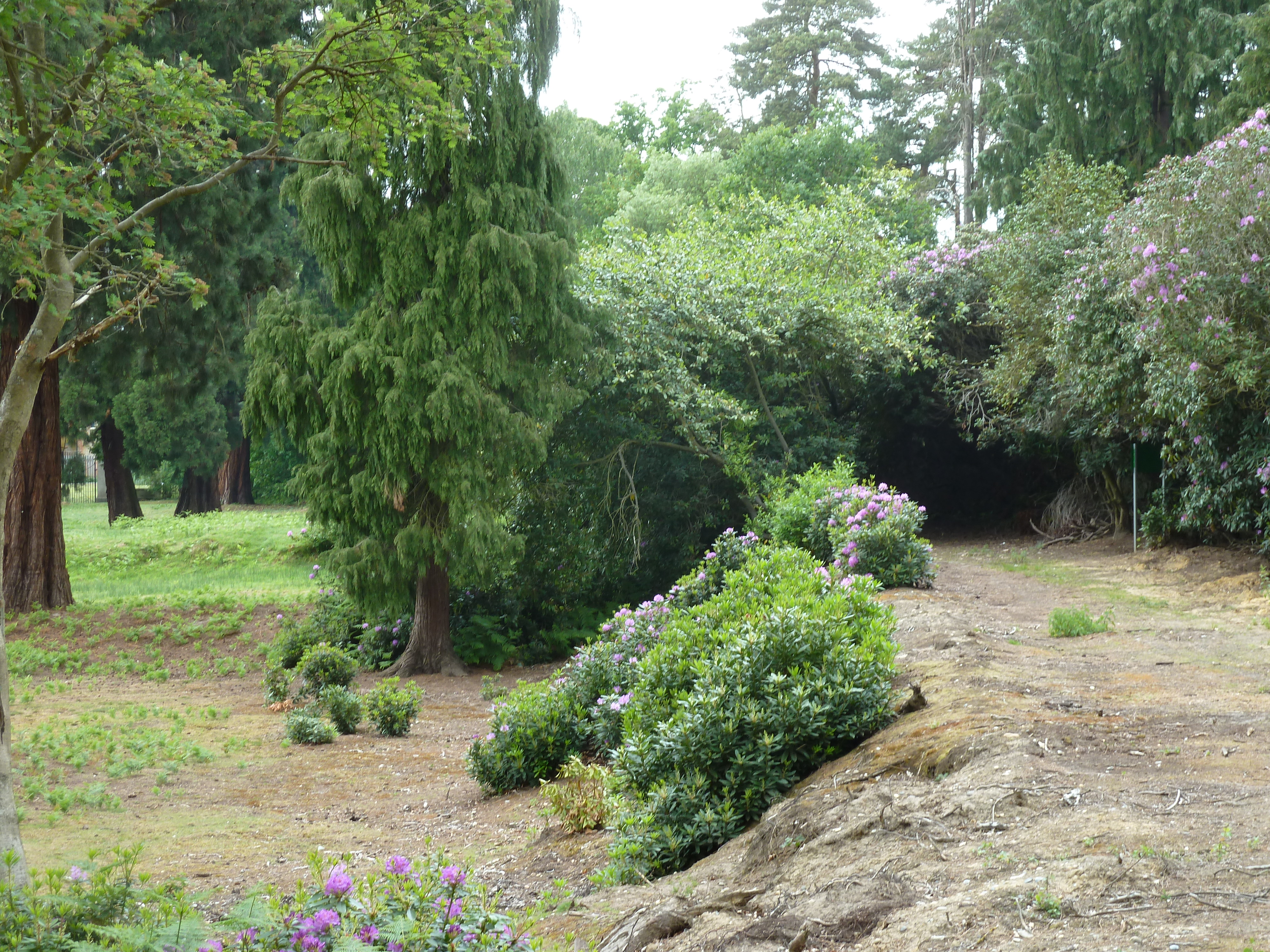
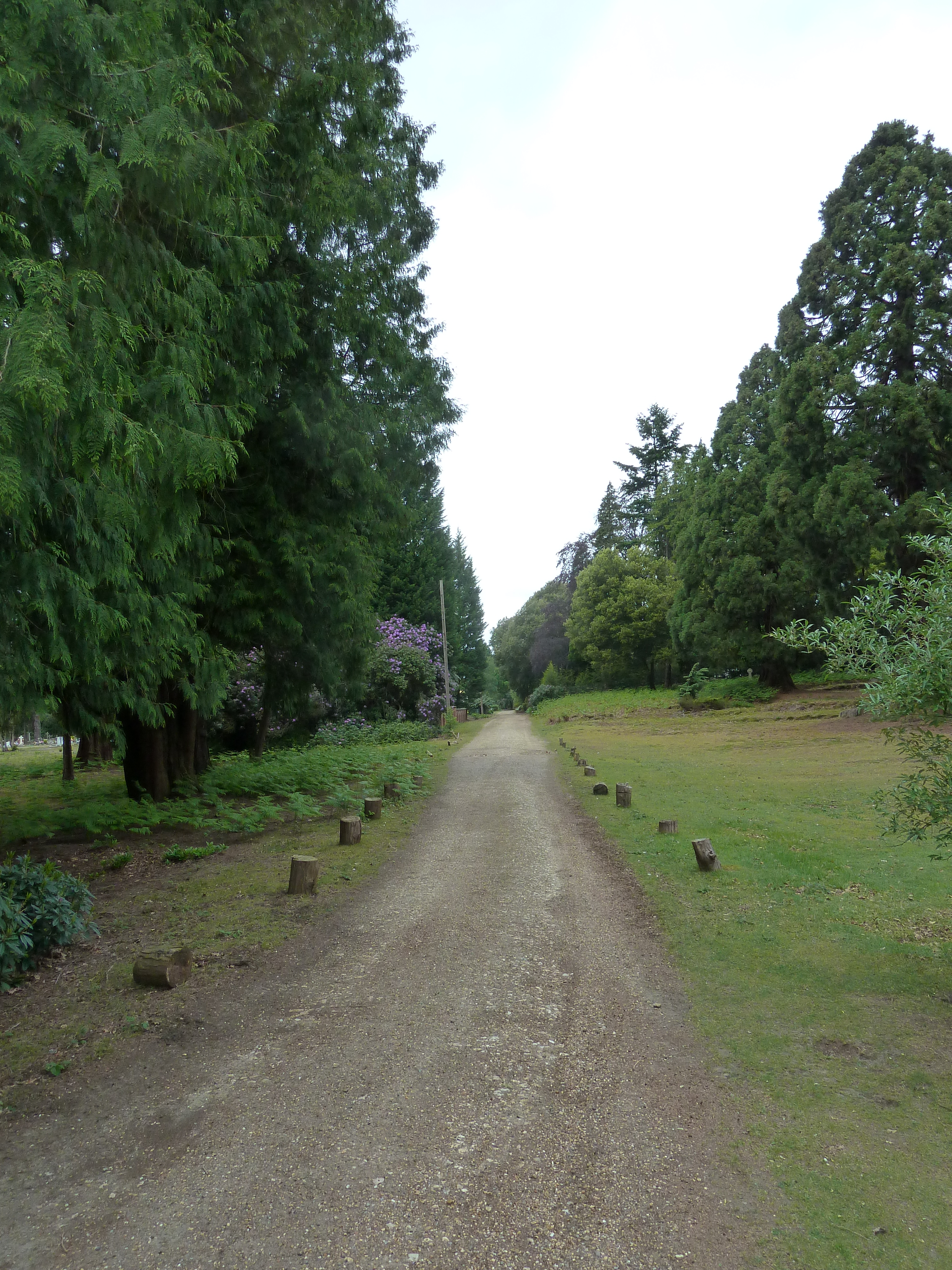
The LNC planned to convert the former railway line into a grand avenue, but this never took place and it remained an unpaved road and footpath.

Although the LNC proposed to convert the cemetery branch line into a grand avenue running from Brookwood station through the cemetery, this never took place. The rails and sleepers of the branch were removed in around 1947, and the trackbed became a dirt road and footpath. (Note: Mitchell & Smith (1988) give a date of 1953 for the removal of the track, but photographs from September 1948 show that the track had already been removed by this time.) The run-around loop and stub of the branch line west of Brookwood station remained operational as sidings, before being dismantled on 30 November 1964. After the closure of the branch line the buildings of the two cemetery stations remained open as refreshment kiosks, and were renamed North Bar and South Bar. On the retirement in 1956 of a Mr and Mrs Dendy, who operated North Bar from 1948 to 1956 and lived in the station apartment, North station was abandoned, and demolished in the 1960s owing to dry rot. South Bar continued to operate as a refreshment kiosk.

== End of LNC independence ==
After 1945 cremation, up to that time an uncommon practice, became increasingly popular in Britain. In 1946 the LNC obtained consent to build their own crematorium on a section of the Nonconformist cemetery which had been set aside for pauper burials, but chose not to proceed. Instead, in 1945 the LNC began the construction of the Glades of Remembrance, a wooded area dedicated to the burial of cremated remains. These were dedicated by Henry Campbell, Bishop of Guildford in 1950. (Note: At the time of the dedication, burials had already been taking place in the Glades of Remembrance for three years.) Intentionally designed for informality, traditional gravestones and memorials were prohibited, and burials were marked only by small 2-to-3-inch (5.1 to 7.6 cm) stones.

Although at its founding the LNC had hoped to handle 50,000 burials per year and even without being granted a monopoly on London burials had planned for 10,000 per year, Brookwood Cemetery was never as popular as hoped. At the time of the railway's closure only 203,041 burials had been conducted, and the rate was steadily falling; on the LNC's 150th anniversary in November 1994, a total of 231,730 burials had been conducted. Even with the unusually large individual 9-by-4-foot (2.7 m × 1.2 m) grave sites offered by the LNC for even the cheapest burials, the site had been planned to accommodate 5,000,000 burials, and much of the land was empty.

Despite the decline in burials from an already low level, rising land values in the post war years meant that the LNC was a valuable and successful company. In the 1940s it bought out a number of other firms of funeral directors, particularly those catering for the expanding and prosperous suburbs of south west London within easy reach of Brookwood by road. The LNC continued to lobby the SR and its 1948 successor British Railways until the 1950s on the matter of cheap fares for visitors to the cemetery, but were unable to come to any agreement. In 1957 the Southern Region of British Railways considered allowing the LNC to sell discounted fares of 7s 6d (compared to the standard rate of 9s 4d) for return tickets for same-day travel from London to Brookwood and back. By this time most visitors to the cemetery were travelling by road. The LNC felt that the relatively minor difference between the fares would not be sufficient to attract visitors back to the railway, and the proposal was abandoned.

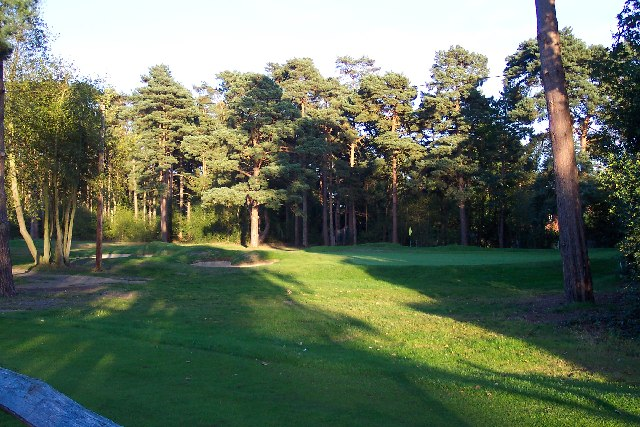
The acts regulating the LNC did not let it build on the 200-acre (0.31 sq mi; 0.81 km^{2}) reserve site, and thus Cyril Tubbs converted it into West Hill Golf Course. The London Necropolis Act 1956 allowed its sale, but by this time the golf course was well established and was not redeveloped after sale.

Owing to Henry Drummond's concerns in 1852 that the LNC was a front for land speculation, the sale of LNC-owned land for building had been expressly forbidden by the act of Parliament establishing the LNC, and consequently much of the land not in use for burials remained undeveloped, aside from the land sold in the 1850s and 1860s, and the areas sold by Cyril Tubbs.

By the 1950s, with the area around Woking by this time heavily populated, rental income from the LNC's land holdings was an extremely valuable asset, and in May 1955 the Alliance Property Company launched a hostile takeover bid with the aim of using the cemetery's land for property development. The bid failed, but prompted the LNC to secure the passing of the London Necropolis Act 1956 (4 & 5 Eliz. 2. c. lxviii), allowing the sale of all remaining surplus land. A new company, the Brookwood Estates Realisation Company, was founded to oversee the disposal of the remaining unsold lands as well as the cemetery reserve, finally formally recognising that Brookwood Cemetery would never expand beyond its original boundaries.

The former South station was near the A322 road making it one of the most easily accessed parts of the cemetery once the railway had closed, and the land surrounding it was now redundant. As part of the London Necropolis Act 1956 the LNC obtained parliamentary consent to convert the disused Anglican chapel of 1854 into a crematorium, using a newer chapel built by Cyril Tubbs in 1908–09 for funeral services and the station building for coffin storage and as a refreshment room for those attending cremations. Suffering cash flow problems and distracted by the hostile takeover bid, the LNC management never proceeded with the scheme.

Repeated takeover bids from various companies were unsuccessfully attempted in 1956 and 1957, until in December 1957 Alliance Property announced that it controlled a majority of the shares of the Brookwood Estates Realisation Company. In January 1959 Alliance Property announced the successful takeover of the London Necropolis Company itself, bringing over a century of independence to an end.

=== After the takeover ===
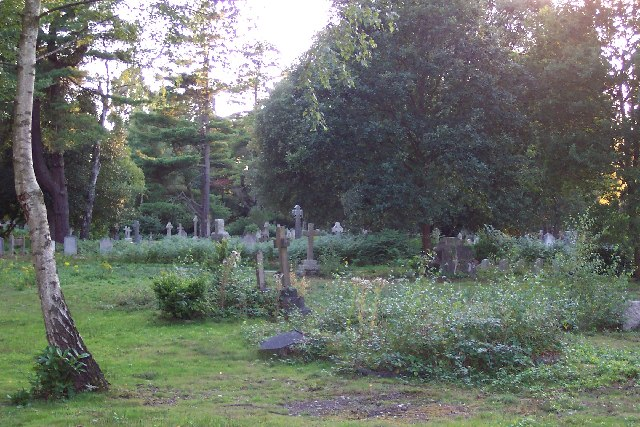
In the decades following the demise of the LNC, much of the cemetery began to revert to wilderness.

Historically the LNC had invested much of its income from burials and fares, and used the dividends from these investments to pay for cemetery upkeep. Although Alliance Property kept the name "London Necropolis Company" for its funeral business, it was a property developer with no interest in the funeral industry, and saw little reason to spend large amounts maintaining the cemetery, proceeding with the proposed crematorium, or promoting new burials of bodies or cremated remains. The rising popularity of cremation meant the rate of burials was at a historic low, while the Victorian character of the cemetery had fallen out of fashion. The income from burials was insufficient to maintain the grounds, and the cemetery began to revert to wilderness. Over the course of the 1960s most undertaking work at Brookwood came to an end.

After Alliance Property's land sales, the London Necropolis Company had been reduced to Brookwood Cemetery itself and Frederick W. Paine, a Kingston-upon-Thames firm of funeral directors which had been bought by the LNC in 1947. In 1970 Alliance Property sold the LNC to Cornwall Property (Holdings) Ltd. The following year Cornwall Property sold it on to the Great Southern Group, the owners of Streatham Park Cemetery, South London Crematorium and a chain of funeral directors in central London.

The Great Southern Group dismantled much of what remained of the company. Frederick W. Paine was detached from the LNC, along with the specialist division overseeing the exhumation and relocation of existing burial grounds to allow property development on formerly consecrated sites. All that remained of the LNC was Brookwood Cemetery itself, by this time moribund and becoming heavily overgrown. Considered virtually worthless, Great Southern sold the LNC to property speculators Maximillian Investments in July 1973 for £400,000.

== Legacy ==
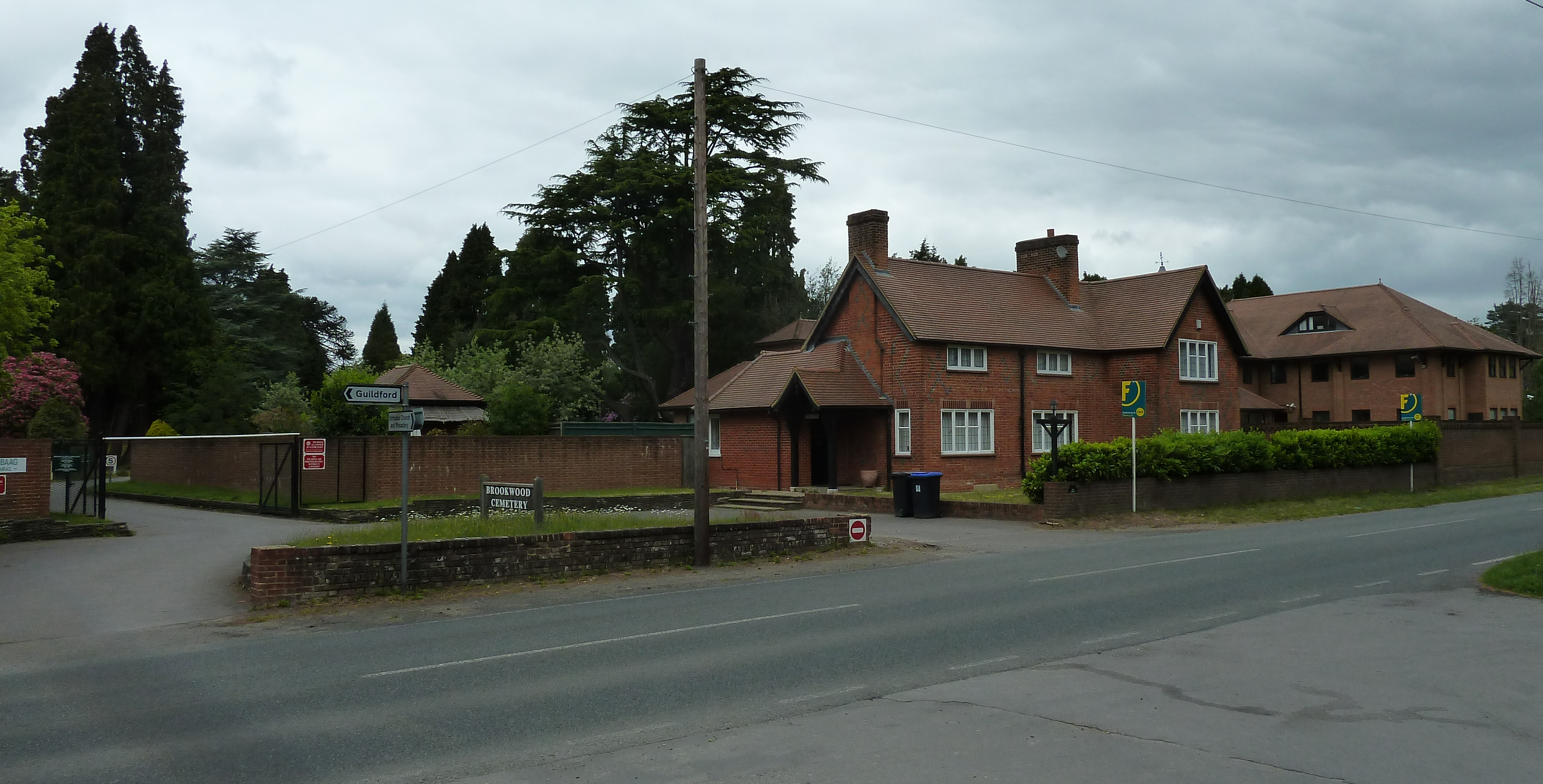
The former Superintendent's office, which served as the LNC's office from 1947 to 1975

As Alliance Property and the Great Southern Group had between them stripped all assets other than the cemetery itself and development within the cemetery was prohibited, the LNC had little apparent value. However, Maximilian Investments secured passage of the Brookwood Cemetery Act 1975, authorising them to sell land within the operational area of the cemetery. The former Superintendent's office housing the LNC's offices, near the level crossing where the Necropolis Railway had passed between the northern and southern cemeteries, was sold for office development. Following the sale the offices of the LNC, renamed Brookwood Cemetery Ltd at this time, were moved into a small former caretaker's lodge. With little storage space in the new makeshift offices, the majority of the LNC's records were destroyed during the move. Tracts of land within the cemetery were sold to various religious groups and to wealthy families for use as private burial grounds, and a tract of unused land south of the Glades of Remembrance was sold to Woking Clay Pigeon Club. The masonry works remained operational until the early 1980s, although not under LNC management after the early 1960s, and were then converted into office buildings and named Stonemason's Court.

Although the Act of 1975 had specified that a portion of the profits from land sales be used to maintain the remaining cemetery, little restoration work was done and the cemetery continued to revert to wilderness. With the new owners of the land interested only in redeveloping those parts of the cemetery not currently in use, the cemetery itself sank further into neglect.

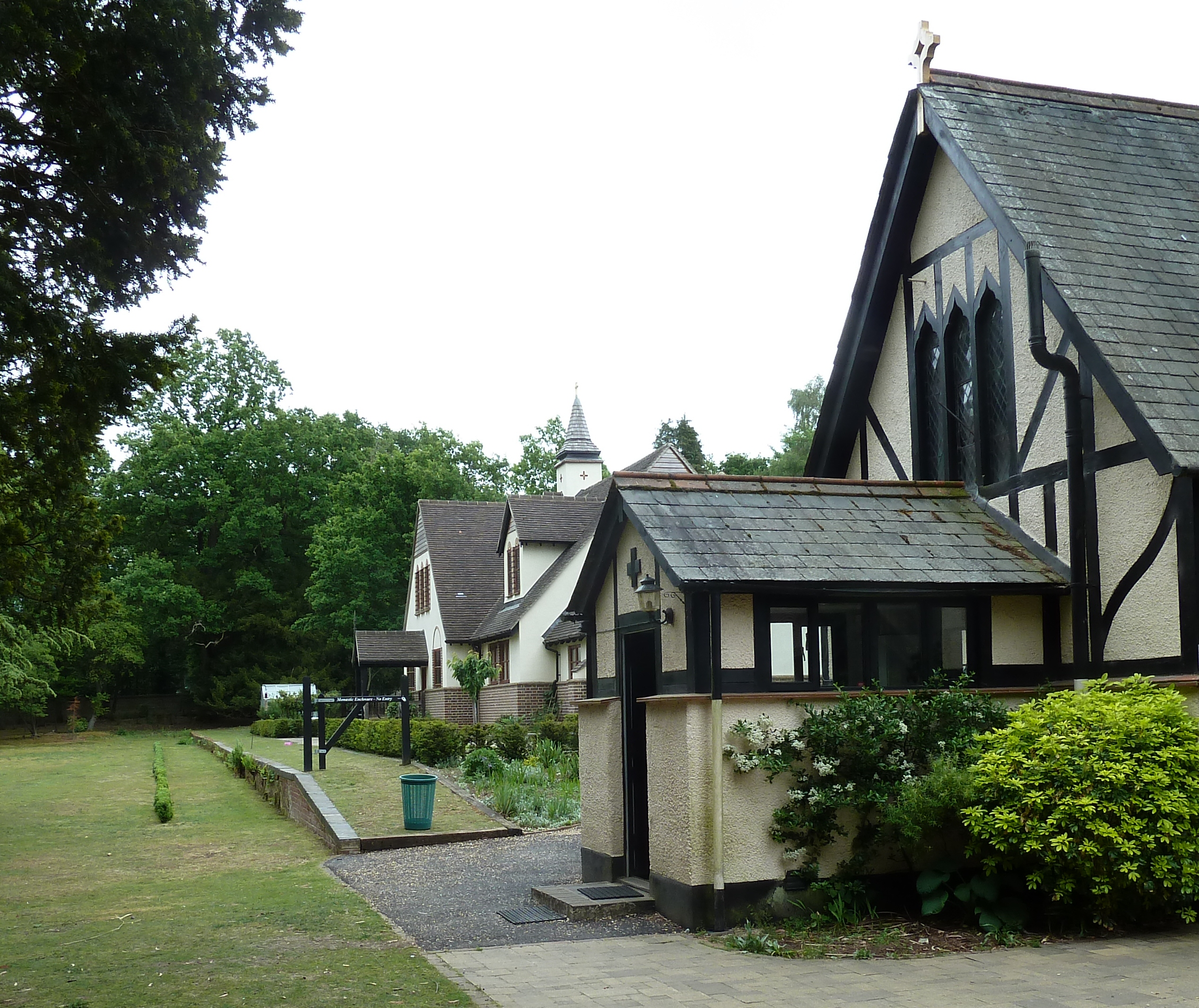
The remains of South station in 2011. The building in the foreground is the 1854 Anglican chapel. The platform now forms part of the boundary of the monastery on the former station site.

The last operators of the refreshment kiosk in the former South station retired in the late 1960s and from then on the station building was used as a cemetery storeroom. Around half the building was destroyed by fire in September 1972. The building was popular with railway and architectural enthusiasts as a distinctive piece of Victorian railway architecture, but despite a lobbying campaign to preserve the surviving sections of the station the remaining buildings (other than the platform itself) were demolished shortly afterwards. By the time of its demolition the "temporary" structure was 118 years old. In 1982 as part of the programme of land sales the station site, the two derelict Anglican chapels and five acres (20,000 m^{2}) of land around it were sold to the St. Edward Brotherhood, an order of Russian Orthodox monks. The Brotherhood set about restoring the chapels for religious use. The original 1854 chapel is used as a visitor's centre and living quarters for the monastery, while the larger Anglican chapel built by Cyril Tubbs in 1908–09 immediately north of the station is now the Russian Orthodox Church of St. Edward the Martyr, and houses the relics and shrine of Edward the Martyr, king of England from 975–978. (Note: Edward's body had been moved to a shrine at Shaftesbury Abbey in 1001. His body was removed from the shrine and hidden in the Abbey's church, and as a consequence survived the destruction of the shrine during the Dissolution of the Monasteries. In 1931 Shaftesbury Abbey's Director of Excavations John Wilson-Claridge located his remains, but refused to release the body until a major Christian church agreed to recognise the remains as those of a saint, establish a shrine for the relics, and celebrate Edward's feast day annually. The only significant Christian denomination able and willing to meet these conditions was the Russian Orthodox Church Outside Russia. Edward's relics were formally enshrined on 15–16 September 1984. John Wilson-Claridge died in 1993, and is himself buried at Brookwood near the entrance to the church.) The main monastery has been built on the site of the former station building, while the platform itself remains intact and now marks the boundary of the monastic enclosure.

In March 1985 the company was bought by Ramadan Güney, whose family owned the cemetery until it was purchased by Woking Borough Council in December 2014. The Guney family embarked on a programme of building links with London's mosques to encourage new burials in the cemetery. (Note: Cremation is forbidden in Islam, and as a consequence London's growing Muslim population requires increasing amounts of burial space. Since the end of the 19th century a section of Brookwood's Nonconformist cemetery has been dedicated to Islamic burials, the oldest dedicated Muslim burial ground in Britain. A number of notable Muslims have been buried at Brookwood, including civil engineer, peer and boxer Rowland Allanson-Winn, 5th Baron Headley who was offered the throne of Albania but refused as he considered the salary insufficient; Said bin Taimur, Sultan of Oman from 1932 to 1970; Idries Shah, who popularised Sufism in the West; and Dodi Fayed, film producer and companion of Diana, Princess of Wales. (Fayed's remains were later exhumed by his father Mohamed Al-Fayed and reburied on the family estate.)) Guney began a slow programme of clearing the overgrown sections of the cemetery and restoring significant memorials. The Guney family's efforts to attract new custom have been successful, to the extent that some of the lands sold off in the 1970s have now been repurchased by the cemetery. In June 1989 the cemetery was designated a Conservation Area, and was subsequently declared a Site of Special Scientific Interest. In 1992 the Brookwood Cemetery Society was formed to improve awareness of the cemetery; the Society holds open days, guided walks and other events, restores damaged memorials, and maintains and improves the signage within the cemetery. It is with these intentions that Woking Borough Council agreed at a Special Council Meeting on 24 November 2014 that it should secure the Cemetery by establishing Woking Necropolis and Mausoleum Limited, as a subsidiary within its Thameswey Group of companies.

While it was never as successful as planned, the London Necropolis Company had a significant impact on the funeral industry, and the principles established by the LNC influenced the design of many other cemeteries worldwide. The village of Brookwood has grown on the northern (non-cemetery) side of the LSWR railway line, focused on the 1864 railway station which remains heavily used by commuters and visitors to the cemetery. Brookwood Cemetery remains the largest cemetery in the United Kingdom and one of the largest in the world. Although not the world's only dedicated funeral railway line, the London Necropolis Railway was the first, the longest lasting and by far the best known. While the growth of the part of Surrey around the cemetery was heavily influenced by the LNC, some iron columns in Newnham Terrace SW1 which once supported the Necropolis Railway viaduct and the LNC's surviving office building at 121 Westminster Bridge Road are the only surviving London Necropolis Company structures in London itself.

== Notes and references ==
Notes

Bibliography

- Arnold, Catherine (2006). Necropolis: London and its dead. London: Simon & Schuster. ISBN 978-1-4165-0248-7.
- Brandon, David; Brooke, Alan (2008). London: City of the Dead. Stroud: The History Press. ISBN 978-0-7509-4633-9.
- Broun, Sir Richard (1851). Extramural Sepulture: Synopsis of the London Necropolis and National Mausoleum at Woking. London: Trelawney Saunders.
- Clarke, John M. (2006). The Brookwood Necropolis Railway. Locomotion Papers. Vol. 143 (4th ed.). Usk, Monmouthshire: The Oakwood Press. ISBN 978-0-85361-655-9.
- Clarke, John M. (2004). London's Necropolis. A Guide to Brookwood Cemetery. Stroud: Sutton Publishing. ISBN 978-0-7509-3513-5.
- Connor, J. E. (2005). The London & South Western Rly. London's Disused Stations. Vol. 5. Colchester: Connor & Butler. ISBN 978-0-947699-38-3.
- Mitchell, Vic; Smith, Keith (1988). Woking to Alton. Midhurst: Middleton Press. ISBN 978-0-906520-59-8.
