= British Humane Association =

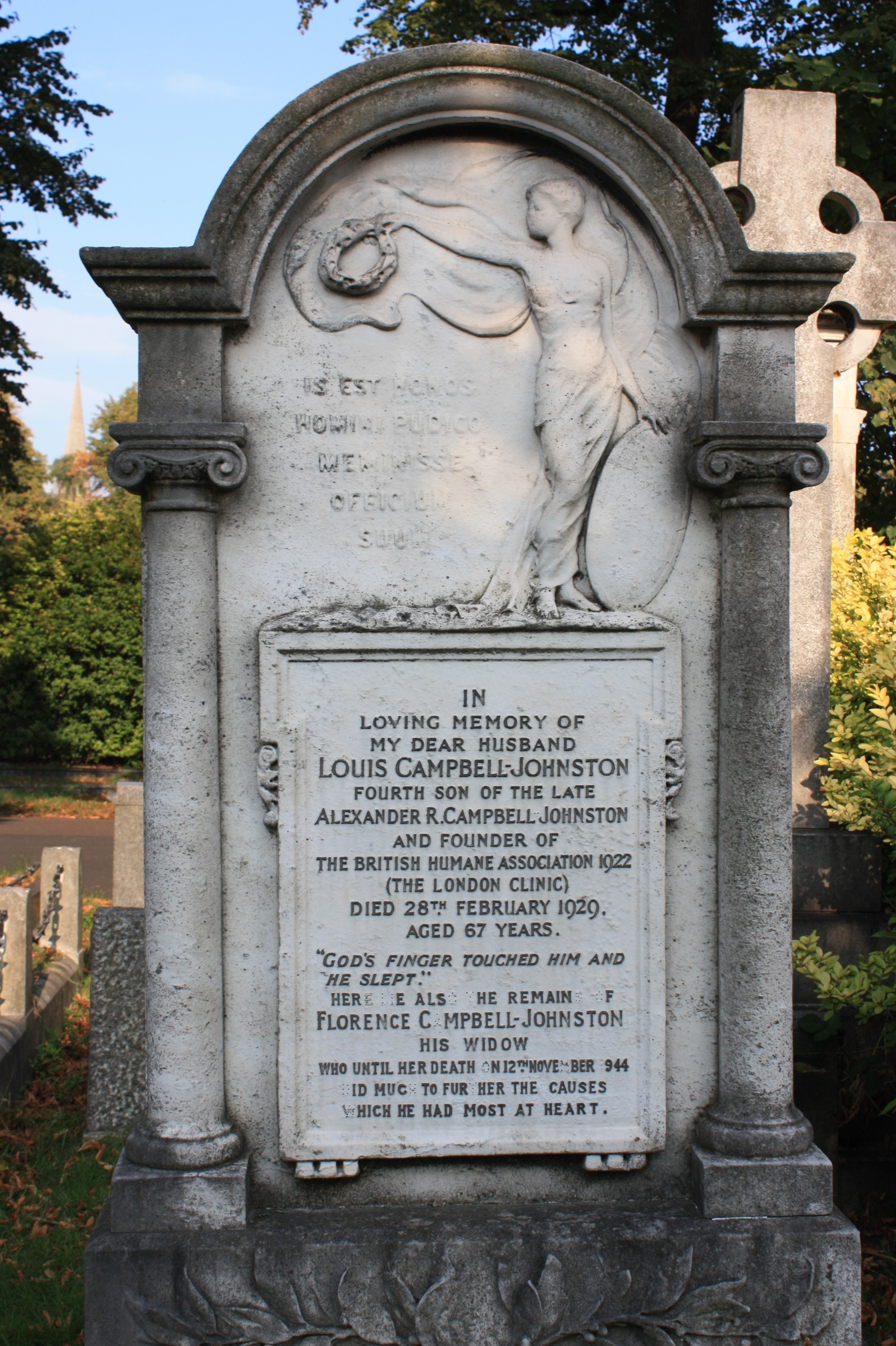
- The grave of Louis Campbell-Johnston, Brompton Cemetery
- Formation: 1920
- Founder: Louis Campbell-Johnston
- Type: Charity
- Purpose: Relief of inhumane activities, relief of sickness or poverty and providing benefits to local communities
- Headquarters: 4 Charterhouse Mews
- Location: Clerkenwell
- Region served: London
- Official language: English
- Director: Ben Campbell-Johnston

The British Humane Association is a British charitable association, established in 1920 by Louis Campbell-Johnston (1861-1929). Its headquarters are in 4 Charterhouse Mews in Clerkenwell, London and it has been directed by Ben Campbell-Johnston since May 1988. The association provides the British Humane Association Grant which is geared toward providing relief of inhumane activities, relief of sickness or poverty and providing benefits to local communities.
