= Chapelle ardente =

Chapel or room

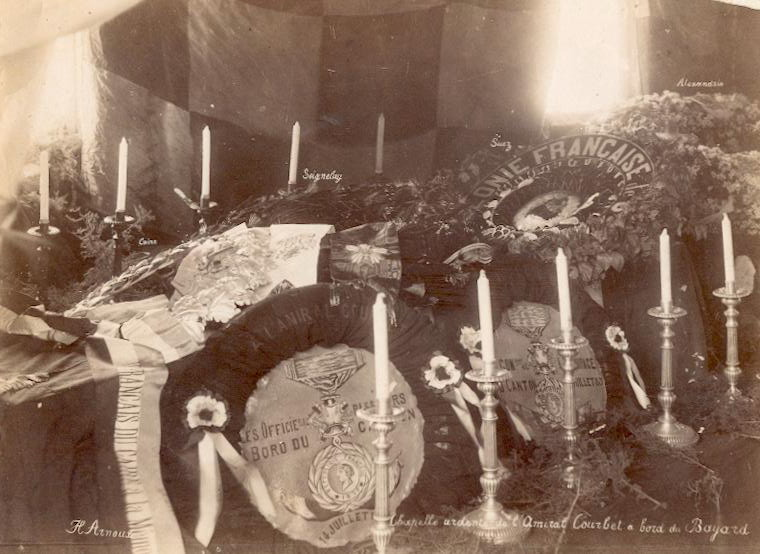
Chapelle Ardente of Admiral Amédée Courbet (1827–1885) aboard the ship Bayard

A chapelle ardente (pronounced [ʃapɛl aʁdɑ̃t]; French for "burning chapel") is a chapel or room in which the corpse of a sovereign or other exalted personage lies in state pending the funeral service. The name is in allusion to the many candles which are lighted round the catafalque. This custom is first chronicled as occurring at the obsequies of Dagobert I (602–638).
