= List of works by Reginald Hallward =

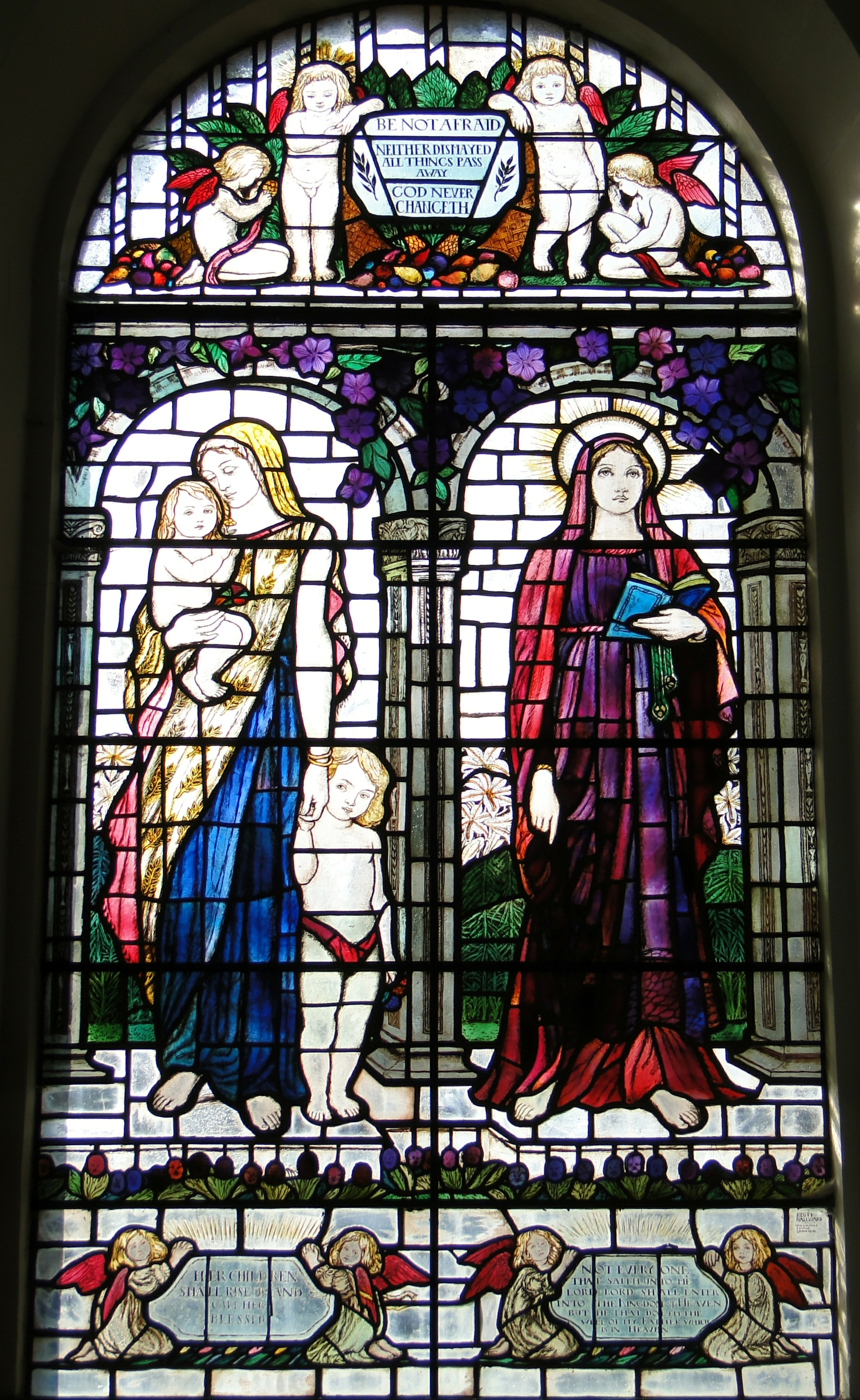
- Window in Ingestre Church. Staffordshire
- Born: 1858
- Died: 1948 (aged 89–90)
- Education: The Slade and Royal College of Art. Also worked with Christopher Whall
- Known for: Stained Glass
- Notable work: See below

Works of Reginald Hallward include the art work of British artist Reginald Hallward. Hallward also created World War I memorial tablets for the Commonwealth War Graves Commission in France and Belgium.

He was a glassmaker, poet, painter and book designer.

== Overview ==
Hallward utilised the British Arts and Crafts style for his glasswork. He preferred to outline in black paint rather than have all his outlines in leaded glass. To ensure the quality he desired, he performed all the tasks for generating the final product. The tasks included "painting, firing and leading with his own hands."

== Memorial tablets ==
=== Imperial War Graves Commission ===
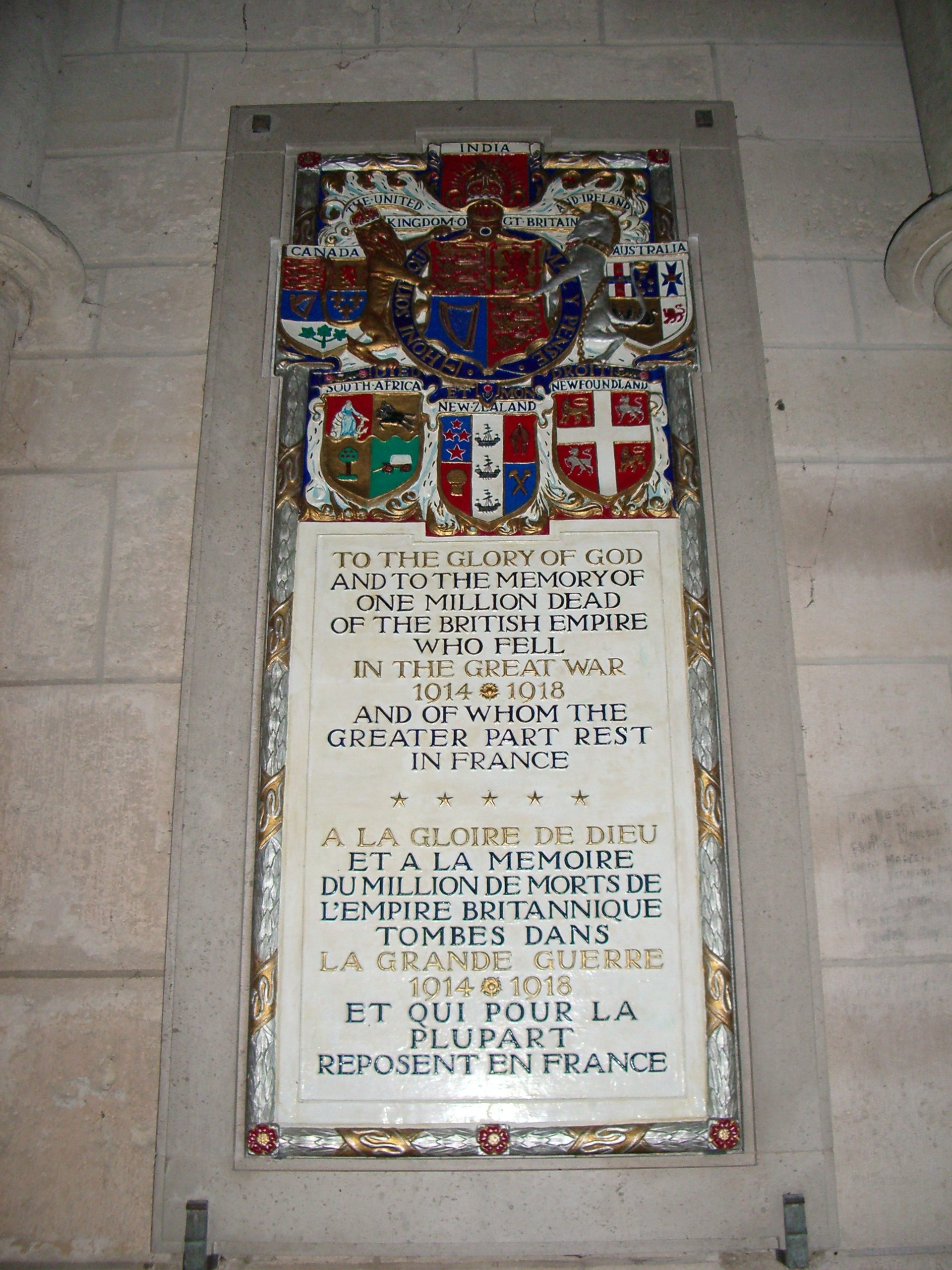
Memorial tablet in Laon Cathedral

In the 1920s and 1930s the Imperial War Graves Commission (later the Commonwealth War Graves Commission) organised for memorial tablets to be erected in a number of cathedrals in France and Belgium to commemorate the British Empire's sacrifice in the 1914–18 war. The tablets, which display the Royal Coat of Arms and those of Australia, Canada, India, Newfoundland, New Zealand and South Africa, was designed by H.P. Cart de Lafontaine and made by Reginald Hallward. The tablets were located in cathedral towns in which troops had been quartered.

The first to be unveiled was that in Amiens, in 1923. In 1924 The Prince of Wales unveiled the tablet in Notre Dame, Paris and subsequently others were placed in Orléans, Marseilles, Nancy, Beauvais, Nantes, Bayeux, Boulogne, Béthune, Le Mans, Lille, Cambrai, Meaux, Laon, Reims, Rouen, Senlis, Soissons, St Omer, St Quentin, Noyon and Arras. In Belgium tablets were placed in Brussels, Malines, Mons, Antwerp and Ypres.

Replicas of the Westminster Abbey tablet, paid for out of public funds, were installed in Hamilton, Ontario and Christ Church, Vancouver. A further replica, paid for privately, was put in St George's Church, Baghdad and replicas of the Amiens and standard French tablets flank the entrance to the main conference room at the commission's Head Office.

=== St Peter and St Paul Church, Shorne ===
Hallward also designed the First World War Memorial Cross of Portland stone in St Peter and St Paul's churchyard in Shorne, Kent. It commemorates 21 people who died during the Great War. There is a representation on the cross of Invicta, the county's emblem. The cross was unveiled on 21 March 1920 by Admiral Sir Frederick Doveton Sturdee. K.C.B. and the dedication was carried out by the Reverend C.E. Marsh.

=== Westminster Abbey ===
Hallward was responsible for the War Memorial tablet in St George's chapel in Westminster, Greater London.

== Altar pieces ==
The following is a partial list of altar pieces that Hallward created:

=== St Martin's Church, Leicester ===
Hallward executed an altar piece in gesso relief for St Martin's Church in Leicester. It has been repositioned along the South Nave.

=== St Thomas's Church, Werneth ===
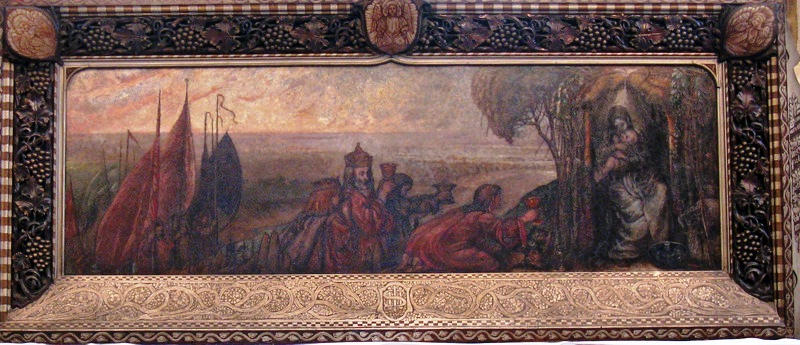
St Thomas's Werneth painting

Hallward completed an altar piece painting for St Thomas's Church, Werneth, Oldham. The work was commission by the widow of S. R. Platt to portray her husband. The centre panel represents the Adoration of the Magi. His wife created embroidered hangings to accompany her husband's works.

=== All Saints Church, Earsham, Norfolk ===
The large reredos, with a central painting of the Adoration of the Magi and flanking panels of child angel musicians, is signed by him.

== Glassworks ==
=== Abberley Hall School ===
In 1932 Hallward designed the four stained glass windows in the Chapel Chancel of the Abberley Hall School in Abberley, Worcestershire. He also painted a reredos. One of the windows includes a depiction of St Francis.

=== American Military Cemetery Chapel ===
In 1929 Hallward designed eighteen lights for the American Military Cemetery Chapel in Brookwood, Surrey. Six are to be found in the East window. They are yellow and blue with depictions of state badges. Angels appear in lights 2 and 5. There are another six lights in the same colours in the North Nave of the chapel with six more in the South Nave area. All eighteen lights depict State badges.

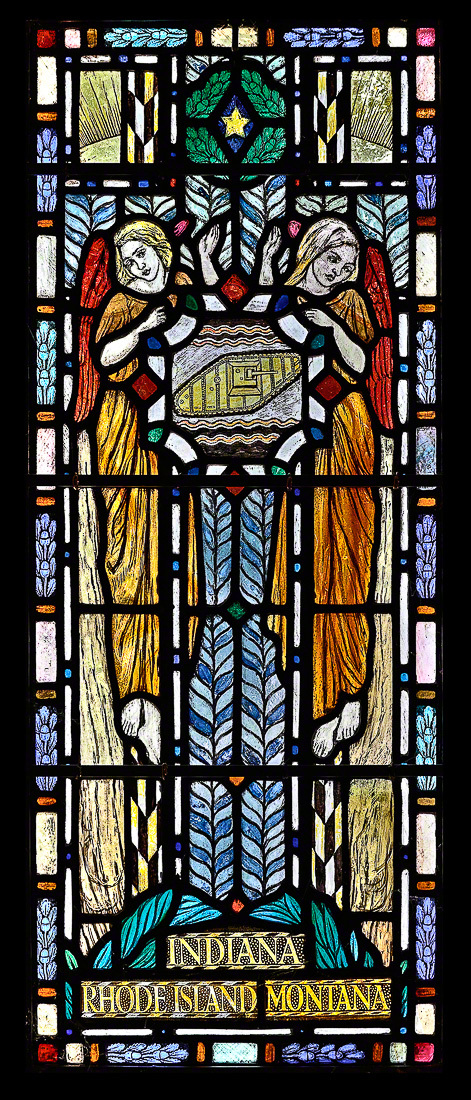
One of the Chapels 18 stained glass lights in the ABMC Chapel

Hallward also worked on windows for the chapel at the American Cemetery at Suresnes, near Paris, and designed the gesso relief map for the Oise-Aisne American Cemetery at Fère-en-Tardenois.

=== Brentwood School ===
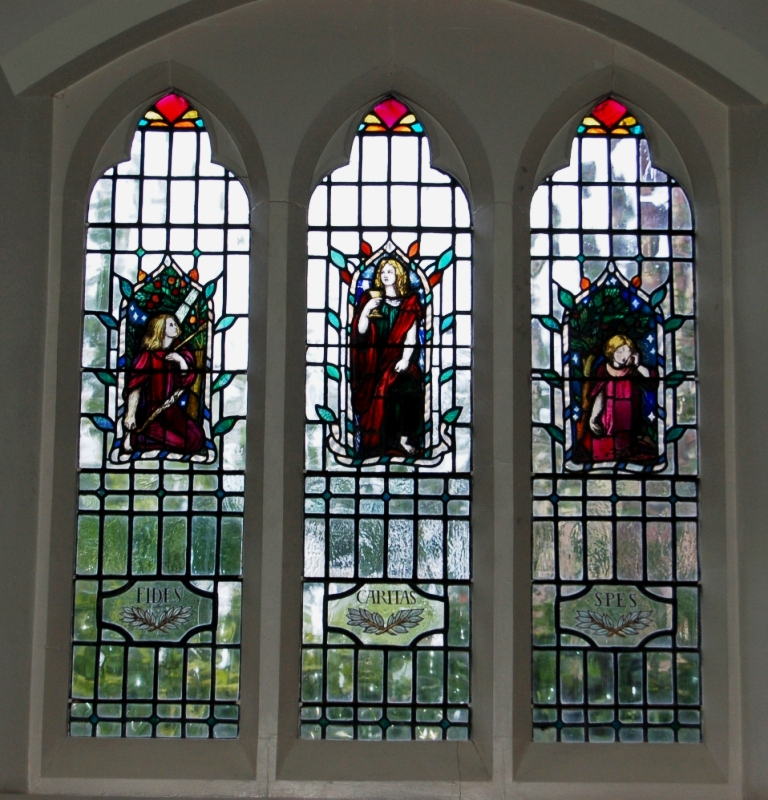
Three-light window in Brentwood School Chapel

Three Hallward lancets in the North Aisle of the Brentwood School chapel in Brentwood, Essex depicting Faith, Hope and Charity were moved to the school from St Mary's Church in Great Warley and were given by Evelyn Heseltine of Great Warley who was chairman of the governors. The chapel was built in 1868 and was originally built in the shape of a cross but in 1925 two aisles were added to the structure as a memorial to the First World War.

=== Chigwell School ===
Hallward took the theme of the Pilgrim's Progress for the windows of Chigwell School in Chigwell, Essex in 1924. He did this by depicting schoolboys as Christian's companions on his pilgrimage and contextualises Bunyan's allegory perfectly. In the left-hand window Christian starts off on his journey carrying his "burden" on his back as he walks forward, leaving the "City of Destruction" for the "Celestial City", and face the temptations ahead. Schoolboys are depicted as his fellow pilgrims.

In the right-hand window, Mr Valiant hands on the sword to one of the schoolboy pilgrims. In the background Hallward depicts the Holy City ("Celestial City") with myriad angels grouped about it, one blowing a trumpet. The "Holy City" window includes a fragment of glass from the ruined Cathedral at Ypres. The fragment was a donation from Sir Francis Lloyd of Rolls Park, who was a school governor and had fought in the Great War. The then headmaster, E.H.S. Walde told the artist to "strengthen the boys' knees" (Isaiah 35:3 – "Strengthen the weak hands and make firm the feeble knees").

The War Memorial Chapel had been dedicated by the Bishop of Chelmsford on 10 October 1924 and was dedicated to the 78 Old Boys and one Master who had lain down their lives in the Great War and on each side of the altar, plaques record the names of the dead. There were only a total of 80 boys attending the school in 1914.

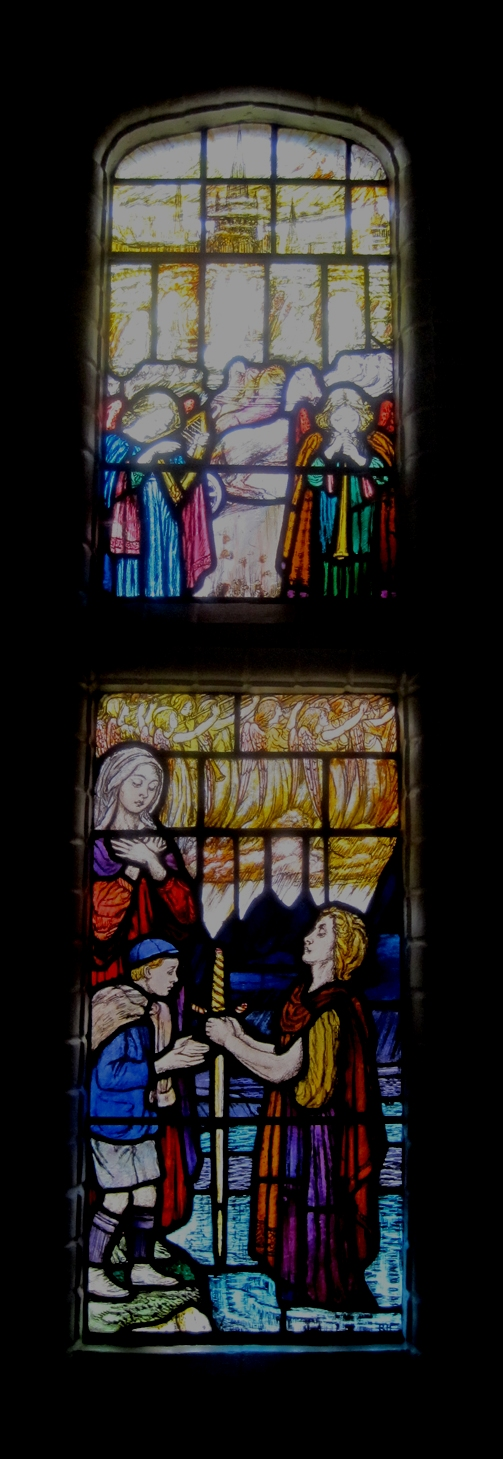
Chigwell School Chapel.

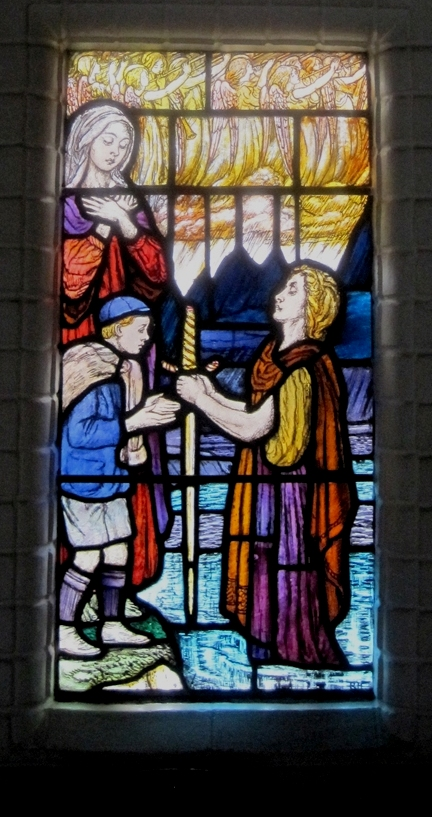
Lower panel second window in Chigwell School Chapel

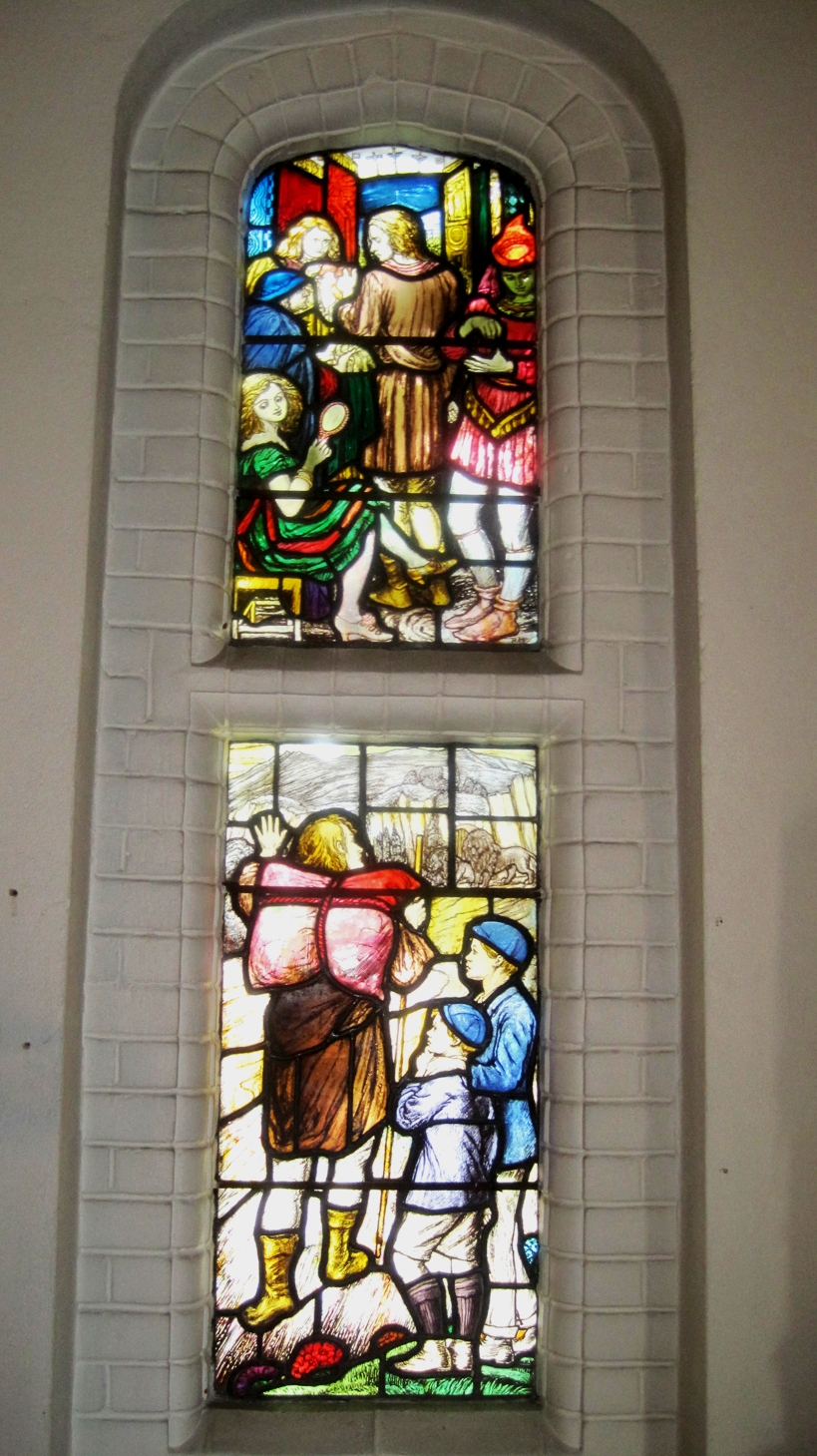
Bunyan window-Chigwell School Chapel

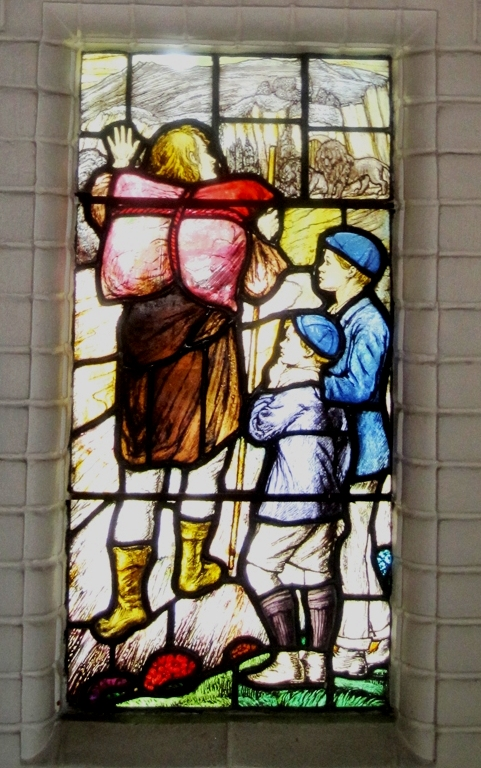
Lower panel Bunyan window. Christian moves off on his journey

=== Holy Trinity Church ===
In St Andrews, Fife, Hallward completed a window in 1912 for the Holy Trinity Church which depicted the Resurrection and the Ascension. It is to be found in the South transept. The three lights on the left represent the Resurrection, Christ wearing the crown of victory whilst soldiers on either side are either looking down or shielding their eyes in amazement and disbelief. The three lights on the right represent the Ascension, Christ has arms raised aloft in blessing and His followers, men and women, are on either side, some comforting each other and others looking on in wonder and sorrow. The inscriptions read "By this shall all men know that ye are my disciples if ye love one to another" and "Set your affections on things above not on things on the earth". The medallions illustrate the reconciliation of Earth and Heaven in individual lives. Reading from top to bottom we have: In the first light – Abraham sacrificing Isaac, the Raising of Lazarus, and the Good Samaritan; in the third light – the Woman touching the Hem of Christ's Garment, Hagar and Ishmael, and Jesus blessing the Children; in the fourth light – the Conversion of Saul and the Prodigal Son, in the sixth light – Christ and the men in the tombs. In the tracery above, angels and the redeemed hover around the Throne of the Eternal, the Alpha and Omega against a night sky illuminated by countless stars. The window was donated to the church at a cost of £1,000 by Miss Beatrice Broughton, who died in 1903.

=== St Alban's ===
Hallward executed a window for St Alban's Church in Stoke Heath, Coventry which was designed by the architect Harry Bulkeley Creswell.

=== St John the Baptist Church, Lustleigh ===
Hallward carried out some work for this church in the village of Lustleigh, Devon, a small village nestled in the Wrey Valley of Dartmoor National Park.

=== St John the Baptist, Tilbury ===
Hallward completed three small baptistery windows for the St John the Baptist Church Tilbury, Essex in 1904.

=== St John the Evangelist and St Erconwald Church ===
Hallward completed a window in 1931 for the St John the Evangelist and St Erconwald Church in Ingatestone, Essex. The window, located in the South Nave is described as ""Characteristic in its use of slab glass and bright colours pink and purple contrasting with the overall green of the Morris windows". Some Morris & Co window had been brought into the church from Ingatestone Hall. See this website for details on the identity of St Erconwald

=== St Martin Church, Westmeston ===
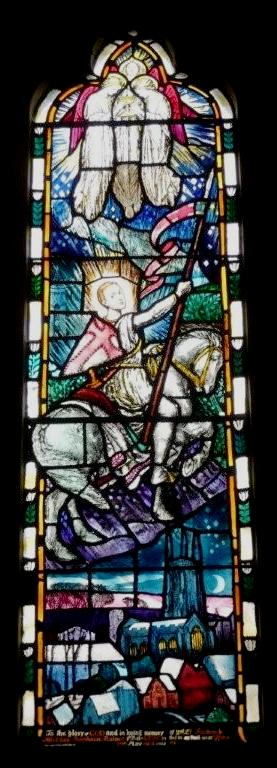
"Galahad rides out" – St Martin's Church, Westmeston

In 1915 Hallward executed a window in the North Nave for the 12th century St Martin's church in Westmeston, Sussex. It is a single light window and is entitled "Sir Galahad rides out". The window depicts St George within a village scene with three angels above him.

=== St Mary Church, Ingestre ===
Hallward designed a two-light memorial window for St Mary's Church in Ingestre, Staffordshire. At the very top some cherubim are shown holding a plaque which reads- BE NOT AFRAID/NEITHER DISMAYED/ALL THINGS PASS AWAY/GOD NEVER CHANGETH". The left-hand light shows a woman with two children and below her is inscribed "HER CHILDREN SHALL RISE UP AND CALL HER BLESSED". In the right-hand light a saint is shown reading the bible and below her is inscribed "NOT EVERYONE THAT SAIETH UNTO ME LORD LORD SHALL ENTER INTO THE KINGDOM OF HEAVEN BUT HE THAT DOETH THE WILL OF MY FATHER WHICH IS IN HEAVEN" At the bottom of the window at the right-hand side just above the wing of the fourth angel there is small square of glass which contains the inscription Regd F Hallward.

=== St Mary Magdalene Church, Cobham ===
A three-light window depicts the Blessed Virgin Mary with baby Jesus in the centre light and angels in the lights on either side. It was created in 1903 for the St Mary Magdalene Church, Cobham, Kent.

=== St Mary Magdalene Church, Gillingham ===
In 1911 Hallward created the "Raising of Lazarus" window in memory of James Allen for the St Mary Magdalene Church, Gillingham, Kent.

=== St Matthew ===
Hallward designed and created five stained glass windows for a First World War memorial screen in St Matthew's church in Ealing, Greater London in 1919. One three-light window in the east aisle, made in memory of Royal Naval Air Service Probationary Flight Officer Leonard Eales Foreman, depicts small angels with a guardian angel in the light and a child.

Another window in the East Aisle remembers Royal Air Force 2nd Lieutenant Cecil Martin Sankey. The Sankey window is of three-lights with an Old Man and a Boy depicted in the centre light and the left- and right-hand lights feature diamonds. Also in the East Aisle there is a window depicting Jesus, Mary and Joseph.

In the West Aisle there is a window which is in memory of 2nd Lieutenant Charles Albert Bolter of the Machine Gun Corps. The window depicts the "Beatitudes" (Matthew 5: 3–11). The final Hallward window is also in the West Aisle and depicts the "Building of the Temple". It is in memory of Osborn Jenkyn and his wife Elizabeth.

=== St Peter and St Paul Church, Shorne ===
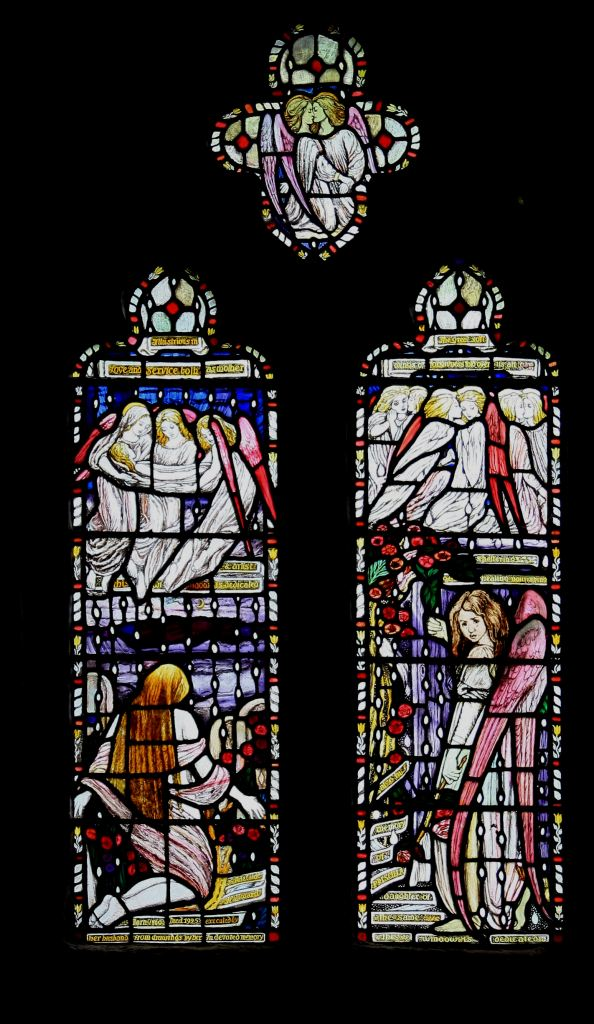
Window in St Peter and St Paul

In 1925, Hallward created lights for St Peter and St Paul's church in Shorne, Kent. The church has a two-light window in the North Aisle area which depicts an angel, said by village tradition to be based on a child of the village. The Pre-Raphaelite window is in memory of Adelaide Hallward, Hallward's wife, and was designed by Reginald using her drawings. The Hallward's were regular worshippers at this church. Hallward also designed the First World War Memorial Cross of Portland stone in St Peter and St Paul's churchyard.

=== St Peters Church, Clapham ===
In Clapham, Greater London in 1919, Hallward executed a set of eight small windows in St Peters church's North Aisle depicting the Beatitudes, a set of teachings by Jesus that appear in the Gospels of both Matthew and Luke. In Matthew the teachings are expressed as eight blessings in the Sermon on the Mount whilst in Luke four similar blessings appear in the Sermon on the Plain, these followed by four woes that mirror the blessings.

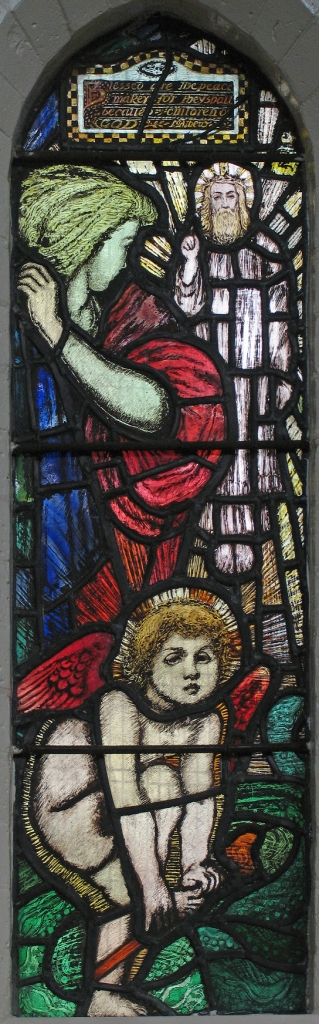
"Blessed are the peacemakers for they shall be called the children of God"

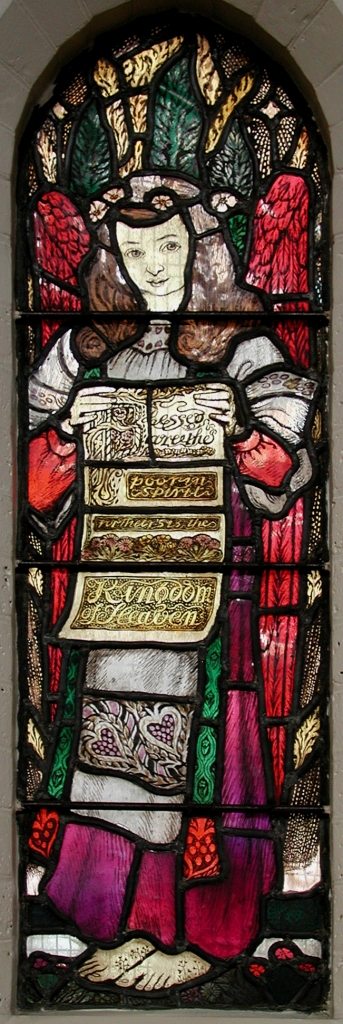
"Blessed are the poor in spirit for theirs is the Kingdom of Heaven"

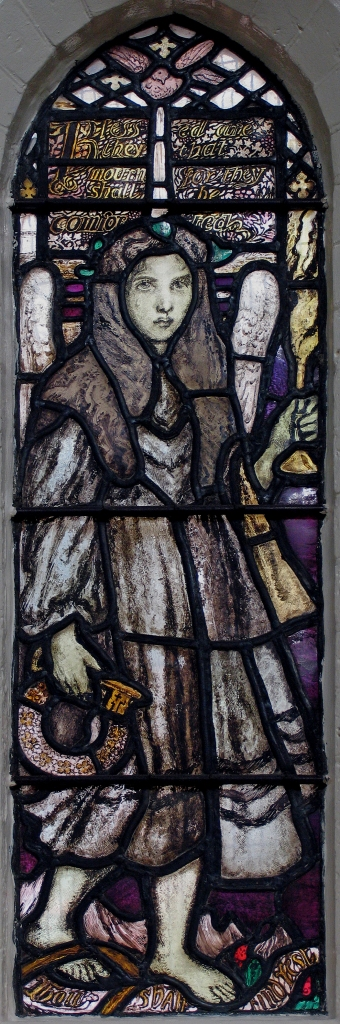
"Blessed are those who mourn for they shall be comforted".

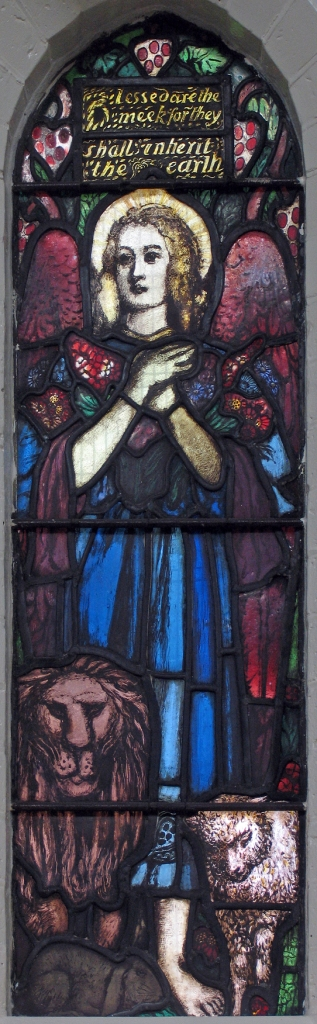
"Blessed are the meek for they shall inherit the earth"

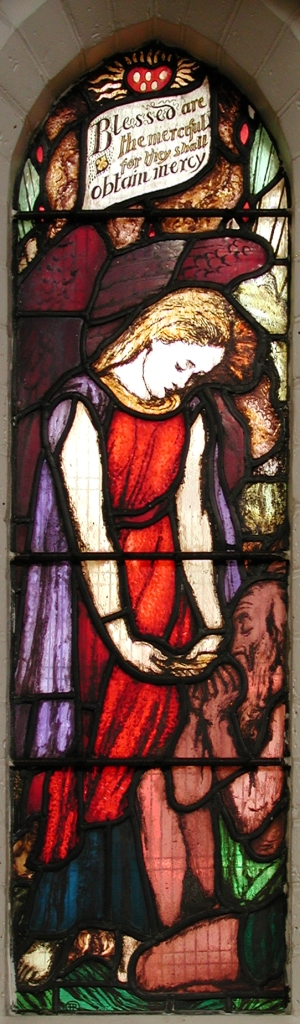
"Blessed are the merciful for they shall obtain mercy"

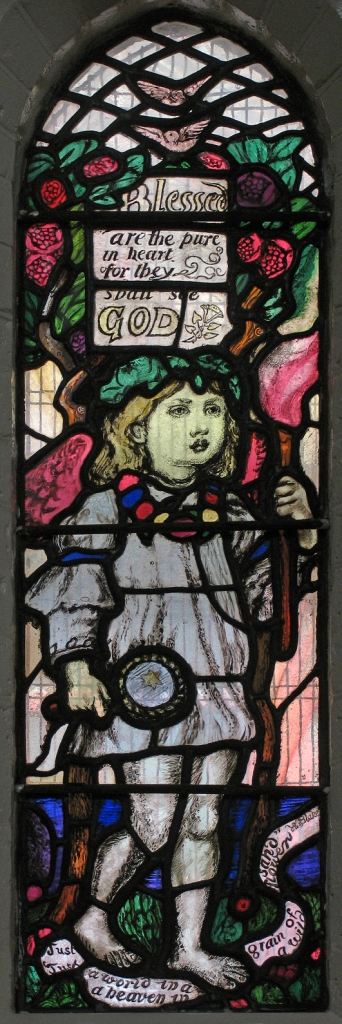
"Blessed are the pure in heart for they shall see God"

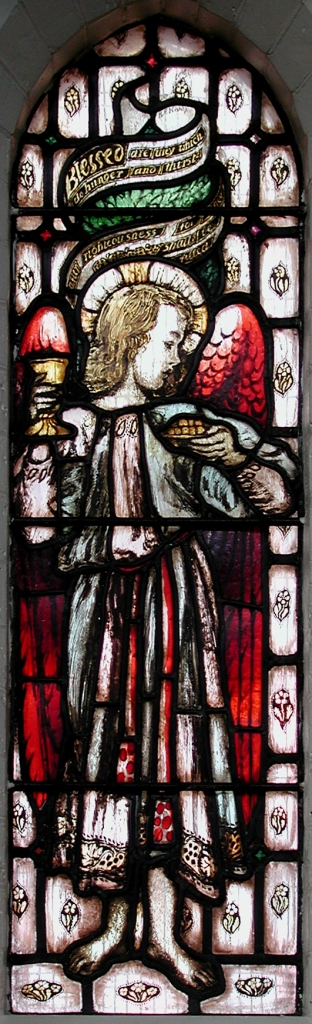
"Blessed are they which do hunger and thirst after righteousness for they will be satisfied"

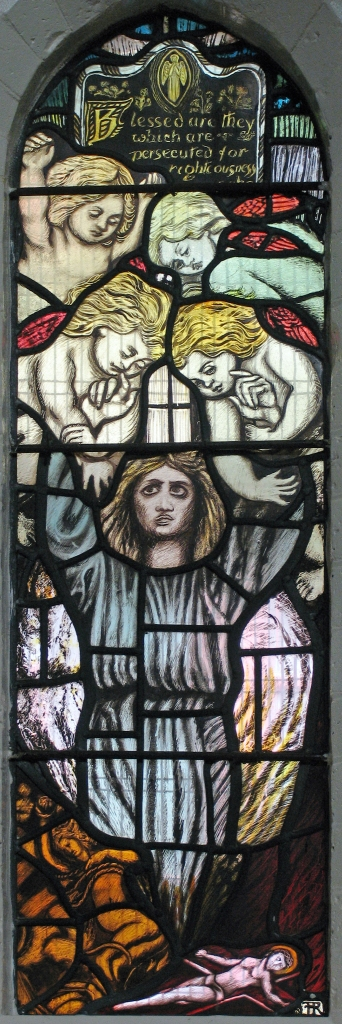
"Blessed are they which are persecuted for righteousness sake for theirs is the Kingdom of Heaven".

== Paintings ==
This is a partial list of Hallward's paintings:

=== St Mary the Virgin Church ===
In Great Warley, Essex, Hallward painted panels for the South Chapel ceiling and also executed three baptistery windows for St Mary the Virgin Church. The windows were subsequently moved to Brentwood School in Essex. This church was designed by Charles Harrison Townsend (1852–1928), noted for his Art Nouveau designs of the Bishopsgate Institute, the Whitechapel Art Gallery and the Horniman Museum. Louis Davis designed the baptistery windows that were destroyed by German bombs in 1940.

=== Oil on canvas ===
The following is a partial list of his paintings: Hallward painted the landscape Newport, Pembrokeshire in oil on canvas in 1937. The painting is part of the collection of National Museum of Wales – Amgueddfa Cymru in Cathays Park, Cardiff (Caerdydd), Wales.

== Literary works ==
=== Published works ===
The following is a partial list of Hallward's published works:

- 1892 – Flowers of Paradise, Hallward wrote and illustrated the book.
- 1896– Stories from the Bible, Hallward illustrated the book.
- 1912 – A Plea for the National Support of Mural Art.
- 1920 – Rule Britannia.

=== Poetry ===
His published poetry includes:

- 1900 several volumes under the heading Vox Humana: an album of verse and illustration that were published using his press, the Woodlands Press. The volumes include:
  - Volume 1 – Vox humana or The Thrush (and Other Poems)
  - Volume 2 – On the Edge of the Dark.
  - Volume 3 – Earth's Ladder to the Sky.
  - Volume 4 – The Temple of Sorrow.
  - Volume 5 – Beauty's Pleasures.
  - Volume 6 – The Little Copse Wood (and Other Poems).
- 1906 – Wild Oats, a book of poems he anonymously published
- 1906 – Apotheosis: A Dramatic Poem in Four Acts .

== Designs ==
=== St Anne ===
In 1951 Patience Hallward created two single-light windows for St Anne's Church in East Wittering, Sussex which are believed to have been designed by her father, Reginald Hallward. One depicts a Madonna and Child and was installed in memory of Mrs Louise Briant. The second depicts St John the Baptist and was in memory of Leonard Hugh Stone. The designs were submitted by Reginald for a church in East Wittering. Both windows were in fact in the East Wittering church named the Church of the Assumption and subsequently transferred to the Lady Chapel extension of St Anne.

== Lost works ==
The following is a list of lost works of Reginald Hallward:

- St Cross Church, Oxford, Oxfordshire: Hallward had painted an elaborate crucifixion scene on the chancel arch but this had deteriorated badly and was overpainted in the 1940s
- St Nicholas Church, Ingrave, Essex: Hallward carried out paintings on the East, North and South walls of the chancel in 1893. However these appear to have been painted over as they had deteriorated badly. The church has an E.R.Frampton window dating to 1894 which was designed to match Hallward's decoration.
