= War Memorials Trust =

Protects and conserves UK war memorials

- Formation: 7 May 1997
- Legal status: Registered charity
- Purpose: Protection and conservation of war memorials in the UK
- Location: London
- Region served: UK
- Members: 2,755
- Patron: Queen Camilla
- Website: www.warmemorials.org

War Memorials Trust works for the protection and conservation of war memorials in the UK. The charity provides free information and advice as well as administering grant schemes for the repair and conservation of war memorials.

War Memorials Trust works with other organisations such as Historic England and Historic Environment Scotland to better safeguard the future of war memorials in both their social and historical context.

== Objectives ==
The charity's five objectives are:

1. To improve the condition of war memorials, in their historic design and setting, to support their long-term preservation in-line with best conservation practice
2. To increase the understanding of best conservation practice including how to maintain, protect, repair and conserve war memorials appropriately as well as raise awareness of the support available from War Memorials Trust
3. To enhance public engagement with, and the recognition of local responsibility for, war memorials
4. To sustain access to grant funding to support repair and conservation works in-line with best conservation practice
5. To increase the money raised by the charity to deliver its vision to protect and conserve war memorials

== History ==
War Memorials Trust was registered as a charity on 7 May 1997. It was originally known as Friends of War Memorials. Sir Donald Thompson, then MP for Calderdale, Winston S Churchill, grandson of the wartime prime minister, and Ian Davidson, a former royal marine, were amongst those involved in founding the charity. Sir Donald Thompson became the director-general of the charity and Winston S Churchill the president.

The trust's charity deed outlines the aim "to educate the public and to foster patriotism and good citizenship by remembering those who have fallen in war by preserving and maintaining war memorials."

At the end of 2004 the trustees of the charity decided upon a new name, War Memorials Trust, to replace Friends of War Memorials. The change came into effect in January 2005, along with a change of logo.

== Conservation advice ==
War Memorials Trust has a conservation team who provide free advice about war memorial issues. In 2017 and 2018 the charity dealt with 367 new cases and 1,005 general enquiries.

Cases that the trust has recently been involved with include:

- Warehorne Providence Chapel war memorial – when the Chapel closed War Memorials Trust assisted by temporarily taking the war memorial into storage while a new location was identified. n. The charity funded repair and conservation works totalling £6,650 to improve the condition to give it a better chance of securing a new home. In 2017, Ashford Borough Museum agreed to display the memorial and it was installed in April 2018.
- Poole Park – a Regional Volunteer highlighted concerns to the council in 2007 about the condition of their war memorial. After correspondence, site visits and extensive advice a £31,280 grant through the Grants for War Memorials Memorials scheme funding by The Wolfson Foundation towards repair and conservation works was paid in 2019.

== Grant schemes ==
War Memorials Trust administers grant schemes which between them cover the whole of the UK. These grants are for the repair and conservation of war memorials. In 2017 the trust's work as a funder was recognised when it won the DSC's Great Giving Funder Award.

Record levels of grant funding were awarded during the centenary of World War I. This was mainly due to both the UK and Scottish government's recognition of the trust's expertise which meant the additional centenary funding for war memorials was administered by the charity.

The Centenary Memorials Restoration Fund was funded by Historic Environment Scotland and the Scottish government. Between 2013 and 2019 it distributed £1 million to support 154 projects across Scotland. Across the UK the department of Digital, Culture, Media and Sport supported the First World War Memorials Programme a partnership between Civic Voice, Historic England, Imperial War Museums and War Memorials Trust to support war memorials. Through War Memorials Trust £2 million was allocated to repair and conservation projects as communities used the centenary to ensure their war memorials were being conserved for future generations. The charity received a further £1 million to provide the staff and resources required to ensure that all works undertaken followed best conservation practice minimising the potential of damage to the historic fabric as people are often unaware of the potential problems that can be caused if materials such as stone and metal are treated incorrectly.

Following the end of the centenary War Memorials Trust will continue to sustain grant programmes but the scale will fall significantly as the centenary funding ends.

Projects funded by the trust include:

1. Isle of Lewis war memorial is an 85 ft Scots Baronial Tower commemorating 1,151 Lewismen from World War I. It received the largest grant War Memorials Trust had ever given – £132,100 towards extensive repair and conservation works.
2. Welsh National War Memorial, Cardiff – a grant of £29,720 assisted specialist cleaning and repair works to the stonework, lead roof and fountain.
3. Brookeborough, County Fermanagh is a carved, limestone memorial surmounted by a sculpture of a lion. It was built to remember the fallen of the Boer War with the names of the fallen of both World Wars added later. War Memorials Trust awarded a grant of £7,460 towards conservation and repair works.

== Projects and campaigns ==
=== War Memorials Online ===
This website aims to create a greater understanding of the condition of war memorials across the UK. By gathering statistics on the condition of memorials War Memorials Trust is able to direct resources efficiently, support custodians and focus on memorials in 'Poor' or 'Very bad' condition. The site is user-driven, allowing contributors to create and update records with photographs, comments and condition reports. In 2019, the site had over 40,000 records.

=== In Memoriam 2014 ===
In Memoriam 2014 is a partnership between War Memorials Trust and the SmartWater Foundation to protect war memorials with metal elements from theft and damage by marking them with a forensic liquid called SmartWater.

Councils that have taken advantage of the scheme include:

- Stockton Council
- Fylde Council
- Ashfield District Council
- Walsall Council
- Nottinghamshire County Council
- Derby City Council
- Ellesmere Town Council
- Sutton Council

=== First World War Memorials Programme ===
This partnership Programme, supported by the UK government through the Department of Culture, Media and Sport, was composed of Civic Voice, Historic England, Imperial War Museums and War Memorials Trust. The Programme aimed to improve public engagement with their war memorials throughout the centenary of the First World War, as well as to encourage repair and conservation works.

=== War Memorials Officer campaign ===
In November 2010, the trust launched a campaign to identify a War Memorials Officer (WMO) at each local authority in the UK. A WMO is the main point of contact at that council regarding war memorial issues for the public and the trust. By the end of 2015–16, 290 War Memorials Officers had been identified. With the end of the centenary of World War I the project was ended as the charity lacked the administrative resources to sustain it as contacts changed so frequently.

=== Learning programme ===
In August 2011 War Memorials Trust launched its youth focused Learning Programme, 'We will always remember.' The aim of this programme was to build a greater understanding of war memorial heritage among young people so that they could continue to protect war memorials in the future as custodians. The Learning Programme provided National Curriculum linked lesson materials for primary and secondary school teachers, and offered talks or assemblies for schools and youth groups such as Scouts, Cadets and Duke of Edinburgh Award participants. In 2019, the Learning Programme officially ended due to a lack of resources, though War Memorials Trust continues to maintain the 'We will always remember' website to promote its educational work.

== Membership ==
War Memorials Trust has a membership consisting of individuals and organisations. On 31 March 2018 the charity had 2,641 members (2017: 2,679).

== Volunteering ==
Regional volunteers undertake a range of activities such as monitoring the condition of local war memorials and reporting those at risk to the trust, researching and applying for the listing of war memorials and promoting the charity by giving talks and organising events. War Memorials Trust had 149 Regional Volunteers throughout the UK on 31 March 2018 (2017: 122).

== See also ==
- American War Memorials Overseas
- Commonwealth War Graves Commission
- Railway war memorials in the United Kingdom
- Scottish war memorials
- War memorials
- War Memorials Register
