= Clark Veterans Cemetery =

ABMC cemetery in Luzon, Philippines

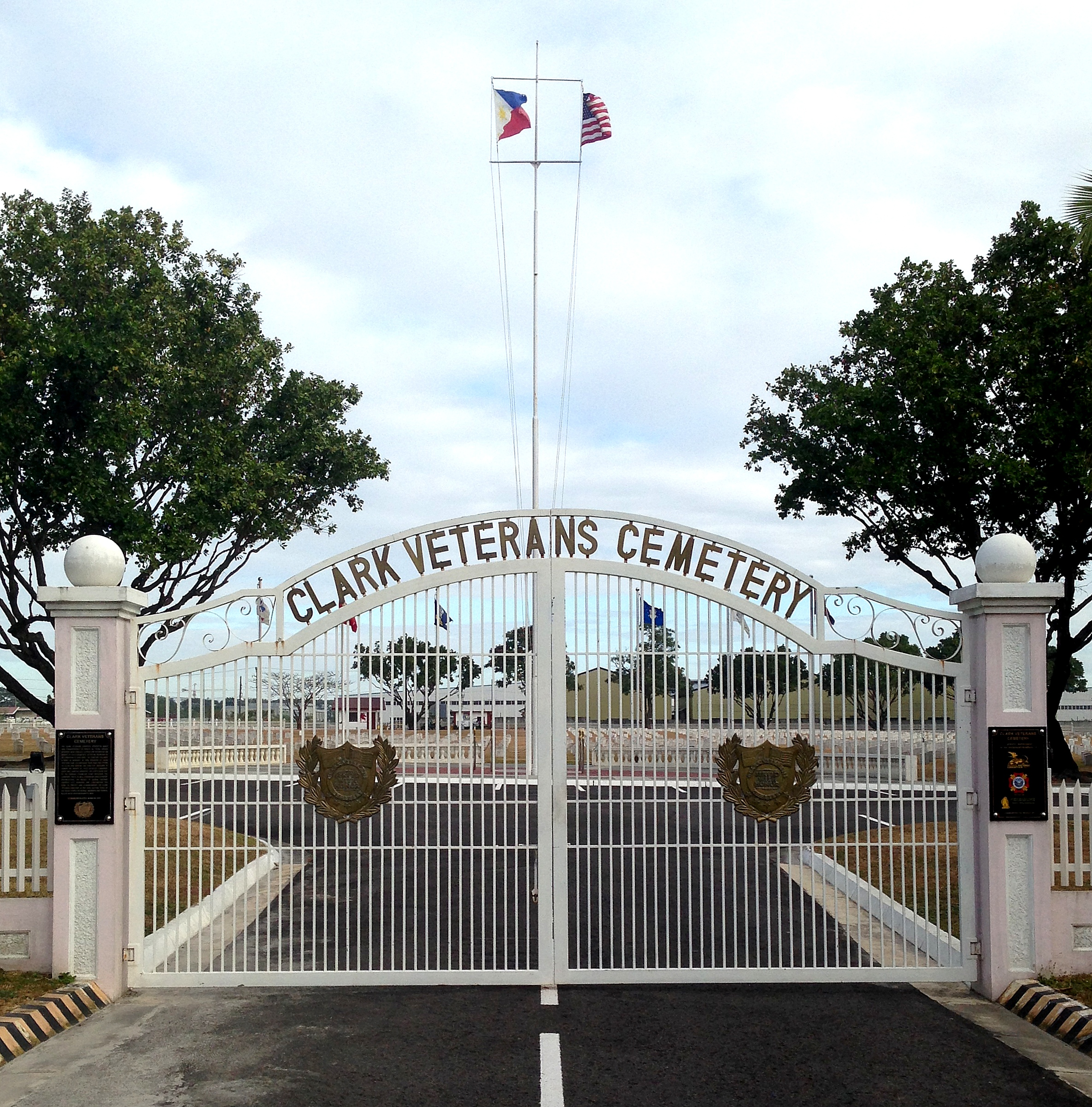
- Interactive map of Clark Veterans Cemetery

Details
- Established: 1948
- Location: Clark Freeport Zone, Angeles City, Pampanga
- Country: Philippines
- Coordinates: 15°10′03″N 120°34′28″E
- Type: Military
- Owned by: Philippine government, managed by American Battle Monuments Commission
- Size: 20.365 acres (8.241 ha)
- No. of interments: 8,600+
- Website: Official website
- Find a Grave: Clark Veterans Cemetery

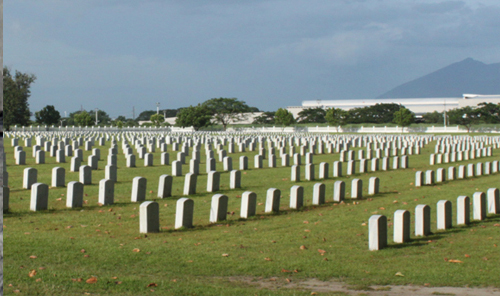
Graves at Clark Cemetery, 2011

Clark Veterans Cemetery is located in Clark Freeport Zone, Angeles City, Philippines. The cemetery is the burial place for thousands of mainly American veterans and Filipino Scouts who served in the United States Army, and who died in conflicts other than World War II or on military bases in the Philippines.

== History ==
The origins of the Clark Veterans Cemetery can be traced to 1900 after the conclusion of the Spanish–American War. As a result of the war, the United States acquired the Philippines from Spain and established a number of US Army posts throughout the islands. These included a large Army base in Manila named Fort William McKinley and an even larger US Cavalry base 50 miles north of Manila called Fort Stotsenburg (now Clark). Similarly the US Navy, after Rear Admiral George Dewey defeated the Spanish Navy in the Battle of Manila Bay, created naval bases including one at Sangley Point in Cavite. Many of these military installations had post cemeteries. The largest was the cemetery at Fort William McKinley in Manila. During World War II, the Fort McKinley military post cemetery was the scene of heavy fighting because it was strategically situated on a hill that overlooked the city and Manila Bay. During the battle to liberate Manila in early 1945, thousands of graves and cemetery records were lost or damaged, including a large marble obelisk Monument to the Unknown Dead.

=== Remains moved to Clark ===
After World War II, in 1946, the US and Philippine governments determined that this site would be the best location for a new cemetery and memorial to honor those who died throughout Southeast Asia during World War II. However, in order to accommodate as many as 17,000 World War II remains, the US Government had to find a new home for the thousands of non-World War II dead already buried there. That new home was to be at Fort Stotsenburg (now Clark). From January to May 1948, all the non-World War II dead at the Fort McKinley cemetery were disinterred and relocated to the newly created military post cemetery at Fort Stotsenburg, which became known as the Clark Veterans Cemetery. Three other older US military post cemeteries were also moved and relocated to this new consolidated non World War II military post cemetery at Fort Stotsenburg. These three cemeteries were the US Navy Sangley Point Military Cemetery and two smaller and older military cemeteries that had previously existed at Fort Stotsenburg called Stotsenburg I and II. Later, in 1949, Fort Stotsenburg itself was transferred from the U.S. Army to the United States Air Force and renamed Clark Air Force Base. This is the site of the Clark Veterans Cemetery.

The Clark Veterans Cemetery is located just inside the main gate of the former base and consists of 20.365 acres (8.241 ha) with room for 12,000 plots. Work began on preparation of the new site in 1947 with the first batch of graves used for burial of remains arriving from Fort McKinley in January 1948. By December 1950 all of the non-World War II dead from Fort McKinley, Sangley Point and Stotsenburg I and II were consolidated in the new Clark Veterans Cemetery, with 5,056 remains having been relocated. This then enabled construction of the new Manila American Cemetery and Memorial in Taguig for the burial of the World War II dead.

=== Mount Pinatubo damage and restoration efforts ===
The 1991 Mount Pinatubo volcanic eruption spewed volcanic ash for miles and covered everything with 8 inches (200 mm) to 15 inches (380 mm) of ash. Later a soft weedy and spongy surface where vegetation grew on top of the ash and an undulating ground surface created when the ash was removed from the flat horizontal stones which now often becomes covered with debris can also be seen. The ash damage is most evident with the lower half of all vertical epitaphs totally hidden from view.

In 1994, veterans from Veterans of Foreign Wars (VFW) Post 2485 stepped forward to help halt the decay. After 3 years of neglect, members of the Post volunteered to remove overgrown vegetation and removing ash. Since then, VFW Post 2485 members have administered and maintained the cemetery in a ‘state of arrested decay’.

A not for profit organization, the Clark Veterans Restoration Association, was created to promote the cemetery's history, to educate the public and advocate for the US Government to reassume its responsibility to administer the cemetery.

In 2011, an American small business, Peregrine Development International, operating at Clark in conjunction with the Kuwaiti sponsored Global Gateway Logistics City Project, collaborated with the VFW Post 2485 to donate and construct a new perimeter fence and gate.

=== Present status ===
Today, the Clark Veterans Cemetery contains the remains of almost 8,600 individuals with the earliest recorded burial being Private Santiago Belona, a Philippine Scout who served in the US Army and died on January 13, 1900. While there are no remaining records, it is believed he was moved from one of the two old Fort Stotsenburg post cemeteries. In addition to the 650 Philippine Scouts, there are thousands of U.S. veterans from the US Army, US Navy, US Marine Corps, US Air Force and US Coast Guard and their dependents, which comprise the preponderance of the burials. There are veterans interred at Clark who served in every American conflict since the Spanish–American War, including the Philippine–American War, World War I, World War II (survivors who died after the war), the Korean War, Vietnam War and Iraq War. There are also over 2,100 unknowns buried at Clark.

While the majority of all burials are American veterans, Philippine Scouts and their dependents, there are some exceptions authorized by the US Government for burial. For example, there are several hundred civilians who served in the US Army Quartermaster Department as teamsters, farriers, wheelwrights, blacksmiths and packers with the majority of these having served in the Spanish–American War and Philippine–American War. They died in the early 1900s when the Army relied solely on civilians to drive the wagons and tend the horses. A female civilian trumpeter who was assigned to the 9th Cavalry Regiment (United States) who died in 1916, and civilian Ordnance Specialists and the Chief Engineer of a US revenue cutter, a customs vessel, who died in 1906, are buried at the cemetery.

There are a few foreign nationals buried in the cemetery. All such burials are directly approved and authorized by the US Government. These persons died on the various military posts and include nine Vietnamese who were among the 30,082 boat people/refugees repatriated by the US Government in 1975 and processed through the Clark Air Force Base processing center and one French Navy Commander who died in 1905 and one Third Class Petty Officer of Chinese descent who was serving in the Royal Canadian Navy and died in 1956.

From the cemetery's initial inception and existence on the various military posts from as early as 1900, through the consolidation and moves to Fort Stotsenburg in 1948, the cemeteries had been solely administered by the US Army and US Navy. In 1949 when the US Air Force assumed responsibility for Fort Stotsenburg and it was officially renamed Clark Field, the US Air Force assumed sole responsibility for managing the Clark cemetery. This was attested by the Commander, United States 13th Air Force when on July 4, 1984, he dedicated a memorial to the "last active USAF Cemetery outside the United States."

By special agreement with the Philippine Government, the cemetery remains open for burials of American Veterans and Philippine Scouts. The VFW Post provides full military honors. There are an average of 40 burials a year, exclusively veterans, including many World War II and Vietnam era warriors. In 2004, a young soldier serving in Iraq was killed in an IED incident and is buried in the cemetery. He was the first Iraq War fatality to be interred in Clark Veterans Cemetery.

There are several monuments and commemorative memorials in the cemetery. The largest is a six and a half foot obelisk marble Monument to Unknown Dead. This monument was constructed of Vermont marble imported in 1907 and erected in the Fort McKinley cemetery and dedicated in 1908 by the Ladies Memorial Association of Manila. The monument was damaged during the fighting to liberate Manila in 1945 and later moved to the new Clark cemetery site in May 1948. A second smaller stone monument was dedicated on July 4, 1984, by the Commander of 13th Air Force honoring the cemetery at Clark as "The last USAF cemetery outside the continental United States". A third monument exists adjacent to the main entrance of the cemetery. It is a Bataan Death March monument dedicated to fellow Elks, both American and Filipino, who passed within 100 yards (91 m) of the cemetery on the Death March trains that carried them from the City of San Fernando in Pampanga to Capas in Tarlac and on to their final imprisonment at the Imperial Japanese Camp O'Donnell prisoner of war facility.

In January 2013, the United States authorized $5 million to restore the cemetery, and placed the cemetery under the American Battle Monuments Commission, who will assume responsibility for cemetery maintenance. In February 2013, retired U.S. Navy Captain Dennis Wright said that an agreement still needs to be made between the United States and the Philippines in order for it to operate the cemetery which is seen as being a tourist attraction by the Clark Development Corporation. In December 2013 it was announced that Clark Cemetery would be taken over by the American Battle Monuments Commission

Following the resumption of American maintenance of the cemetery, there was a dispute between the American and Philippine governments about who shall be authorized to buried at the cemetery in the future. In December 2016, it was recommended that the cemetery name be changed to "Clark American Cemetery" and that it be negotiated with the Philippine government that the operation of the cemetery be changed to "in perpetuity". By 2019, restoration of the cemetery, at the cost of several million dollars, was completed. Increasingly, the cemetery has become surrounded by Chinese-led new developments.

== Sources ==
- MSNBC
- New Hampshire Senate
- USA Today
- Huffington post
- Fox News
