= Brookwood American Cemetery and Memorial =

ABMC cemetery in Surrey, England

Coordinates: 51°18.07′N 0°38.43′W

- American Battle Monuments Commission
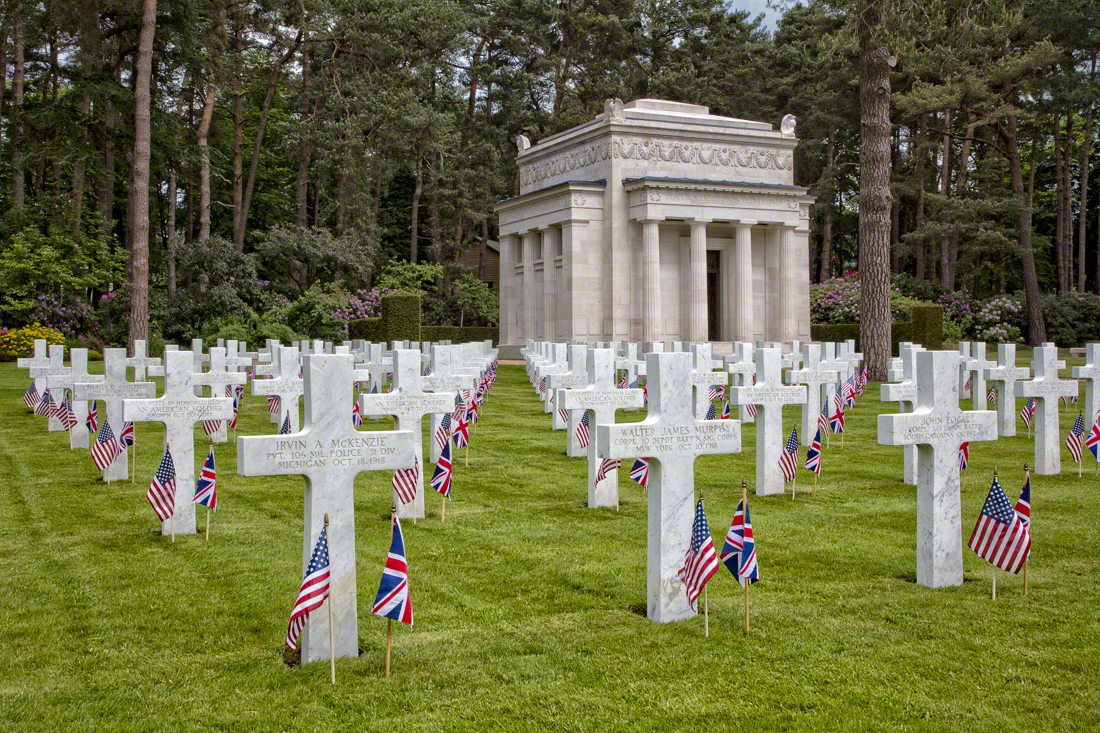
- Memorial chapel and headstones
- Used for those deceased 1918
- Established: 1918
- Location: near Brookwood, Surrey
- Designed by: Egerton Swartwout and H.B. Cresswell
- Total burials: 468 plus 563 commemorated
- Unknowns: 41

Burials by nation
- United States

Burials by war
- World War I

Brookwood American Cemetery and Memorial is the only American Military Cemetery of World War I in the British Isles. Located approximately 28 miles (45 km) southwest of London, Brookwood American Cemetery contains the graves of 468 American war dead, including the graves of 41 unknown servicemen, from World War I.

Maintained by the American Battle Monuments Commission, the cemetery of 4.5 acres (1.8 ha) lies to the west of the civilian Brookwood Cemetery, built by the London Necropolis Company and opened in 1854. The American cemetery is flanked by the much larger Brookwood Military Cemetery, maintained by the Commonwealth War Graves Commission, which contains more than 5,000 war dead from the two world wars.

== History ==
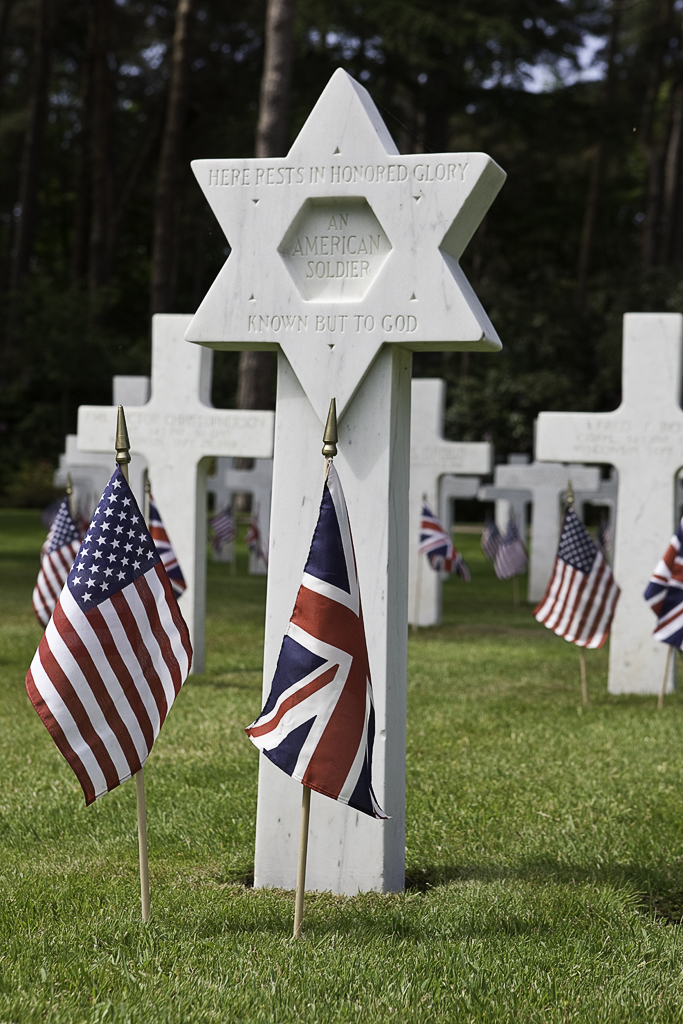
Jewish headstone inscribed 'Here Rests In Honored Glory An American Soldier Known But To God'

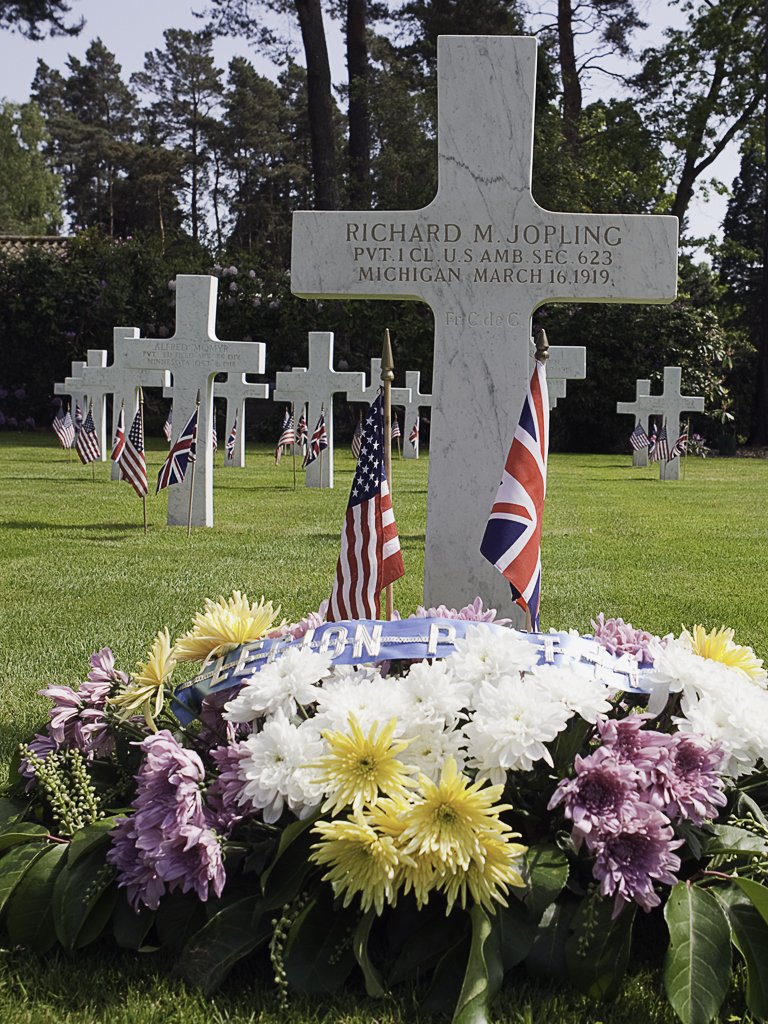
Remembered with Honour

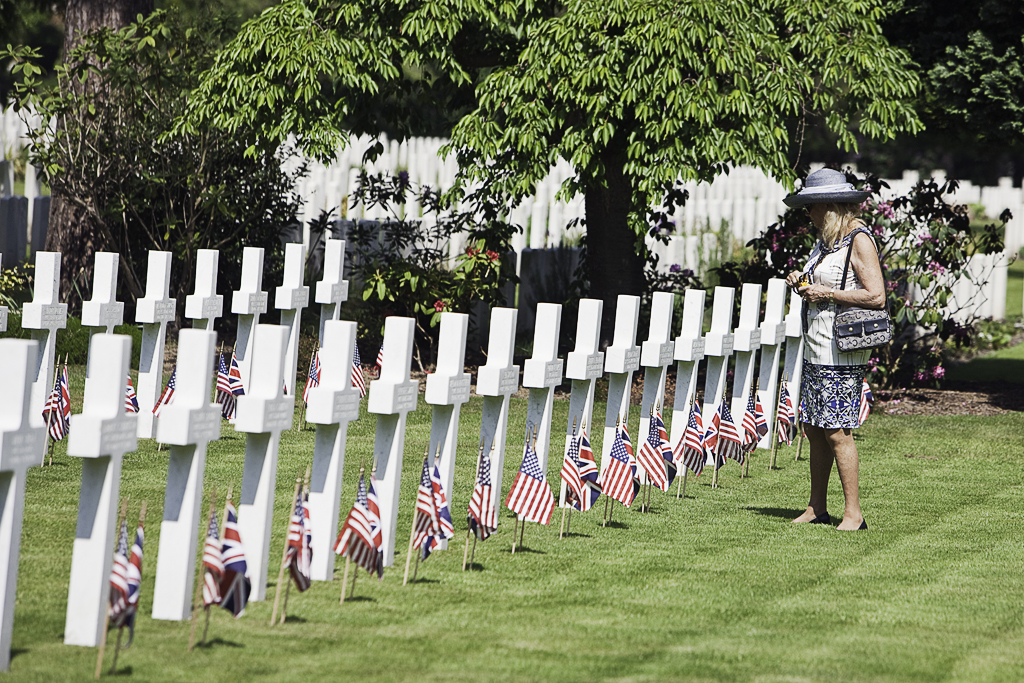
Observance 2009

In September 1922 the London Necropolis Company sold an area adjacent to the Brookwood Military Cemetery to the US government. The LNC was hired by the US government to landscape this area and build a chapel, to create this cemetery. In 1929 the chapel memorial opened. Inside are the engraved names of 563 missing, most of whom served in the United States Navy and Coast Guard, whose graves are in the sea. Most of the dead buried in Brookwood died in Great Britain or its surrounding waters. During World War I, servicemen who died in London hospitals were brought to Brookwood. After the Armistice in 1918, the dead from various temporary sites throughout England, Scotland and Ireland were brought to it. These were members of the American Expeditionary Forces who lost their lives in England or the surrounding waters. Among those reburied in Brookwood American Cemetery were victims of the German U-boat UB-77 attack on the SS Tuscania, a British troop transport of the Anchor Line, sunk on 5 February 1918 off the coast of Scotland with the loss of 210 souls. Also most of the 358 American victims of the HMS Otranto tragedy were reinterred in Brookwood.

After the entry of the United States into the Second World War the American cemetery was enlarged, with burials of US servicemen beginning in April 1942. With large numbers of American personnel based in the west of England, a dedicated rail service for the transport of bodies operated from Devonport to Brookwood. By August 1944 over 3,600 bodies had been buried in the American Military Cemetery. At this time burials were discontinued, and US casualties were from then on buried at Cambridge American Cemetery and Memorial.

On the authority of Thomas B. Larkin, Quartermaster General of the United States Army, the US servicemen buried at Brookwood during the Second World War were exhumed in January–May 1948. Those whose next of kin requested it were shipped to the United States for reburial, and the remaining bodies were transferred to the new cemetery outside Cambridge.

Brookwood American Cemetery had also been the burial site for those US servicemen executed while serving in the United Kingdom, whose bodies had been carried to Brookwood by rail from the American execution facilities at Shepton Mallet. Initially, the remains of the eighteen American prisoners executed at Shepton Mallet were interred in unmarked graves at "Plot X". Plot X was in a distant corner of the cemetery, away from the other plots and next to toolsheds and a compost heap. Executed prisoners interred there were not given coffins, but were put into cotton mattress covers and buried in individual graves under numbered markers. Plot X had room for one hundred graves and was the first effort to segregate executed Army prisoners from those who had been killed in combat. They were not transferred to Cambridge in 1948, but instead reburied in unmarked graves at Oise-Aisne American Cemetery Plot E, a dedicated site for US servicemen executed during the Second World War. (One of those executed, David Cobb, was not transferred to Plot E but was repatriated to the US and reburied in Dothan, Alabama in 1949.) The railway service had been suspended in 1941, and North station (renamed North Bar after the ending of rail services) was used as a temporary mortuary to hold these bodies while awaiting shipment to the United States or Cambridge. As the branch line into the cemetery was no longer in use, temporary platforms were built on the branch line serving the National Rifle Association's shooting range at Bisley, on the opposite side of the LSWR line from the cemetery. Following the removal of the US war graves the site in which they had been buried was divided into cemeteries for the Free French forces and Italian prisoners of war.

== General layout ==
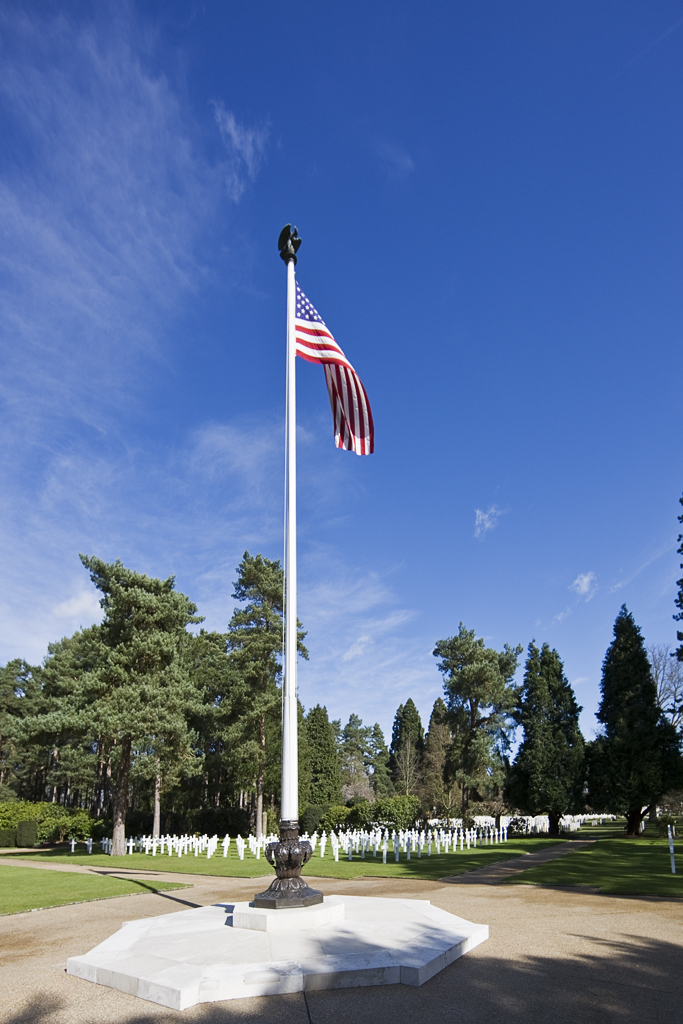
Central flag pole around which the 4 grave plots are arranged

The cemetery was designed by New York architect Egerton Swartwout (1870–1943) and British architect Harry Bulkeley Creswell (1869–1960). Swartwout designed the Missouri State Capitol in Jefferson City (1917) and Brooklyn's Grand Army Plaza Bailey Fountain (1929). For Brookwood, he laid out the cemetery into four plots for the 468 headstones, grouped around a flagpole. The headstones are of Italian Carrara marble, in the shape of the Latin cross or a Star of David. Shrubs and trees frame the grave plots: evergreen, oak and Scots pine. Existing pine trees were retained to give a pleasing effect around the chapel. For color around the cemetery, rhododendrons, azalea and heather were planted.

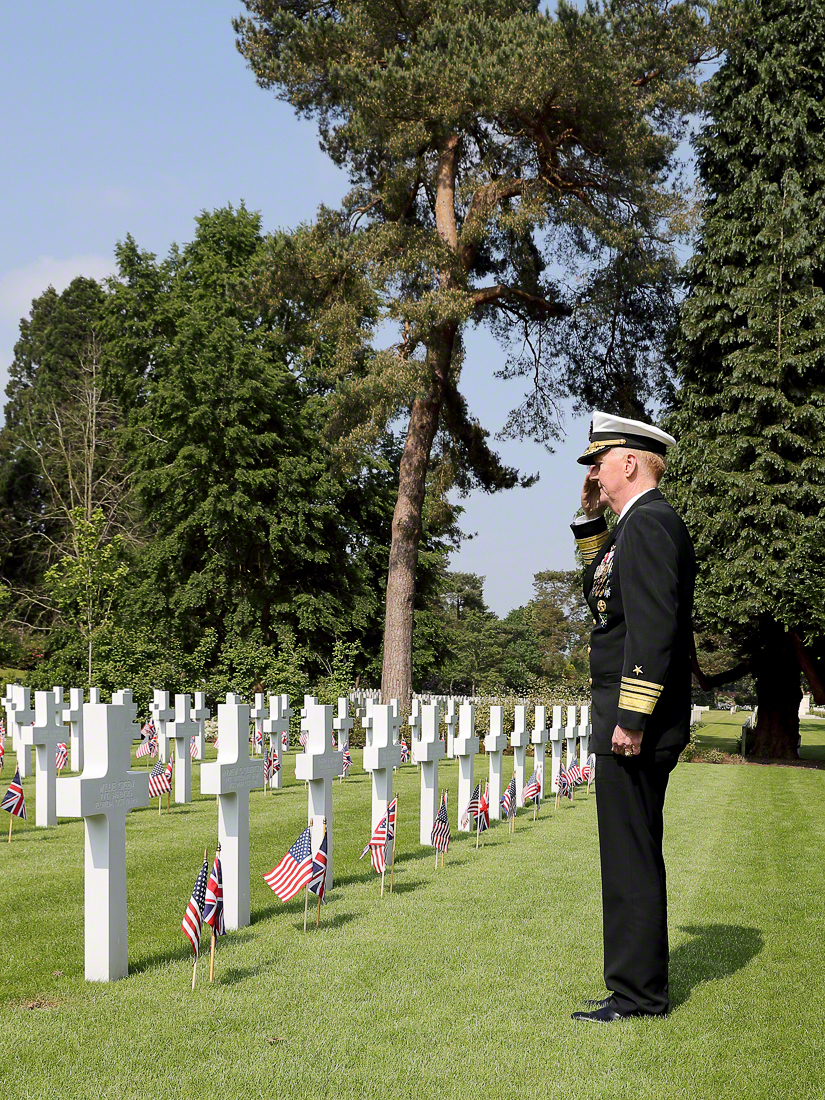
VADM James G. Foggo III, Commander US 6th Fleet pays respects to the Fallen at the 2016 Memorial Service

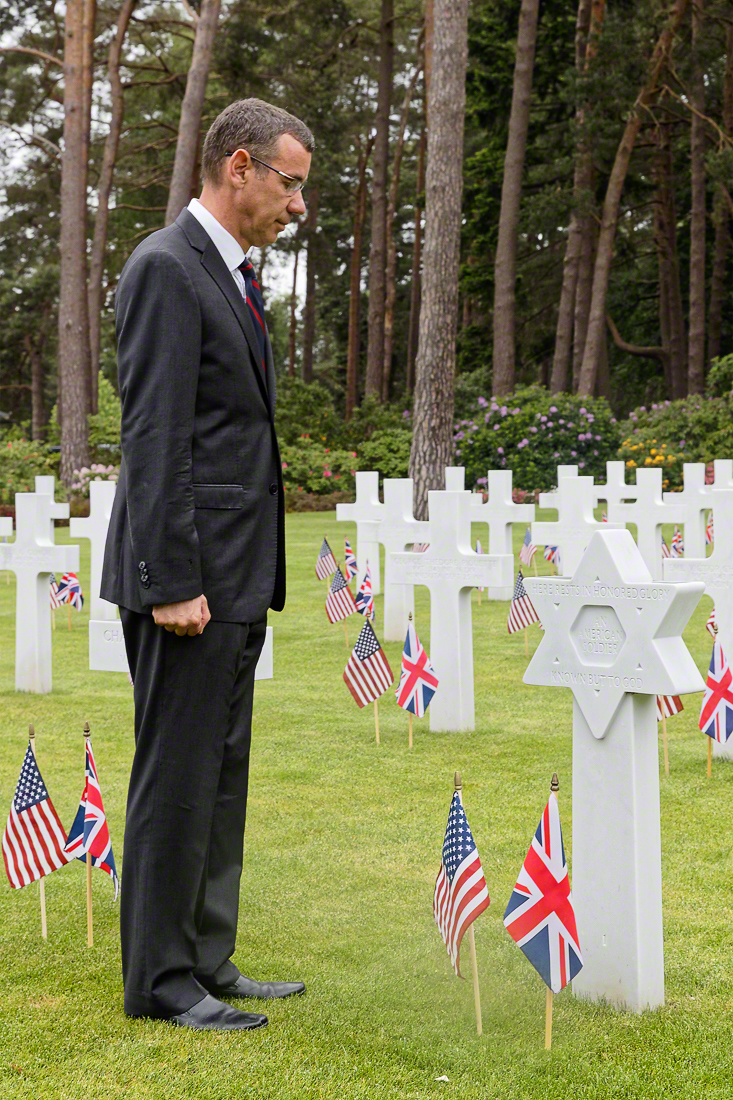
Mark Regev, Israeli Ambassador to the UK, pays his respect at the 2017 Memorial Service

From 2015 to early 2016 extensive work was undertaken at the cemetery in readiness for the 2016 Memorial Day Service. This included replacing all headstones to meet strict ABMC regulations, extensive ground works, removal of trees with borders redesigned and replanted.

== The chapel ==
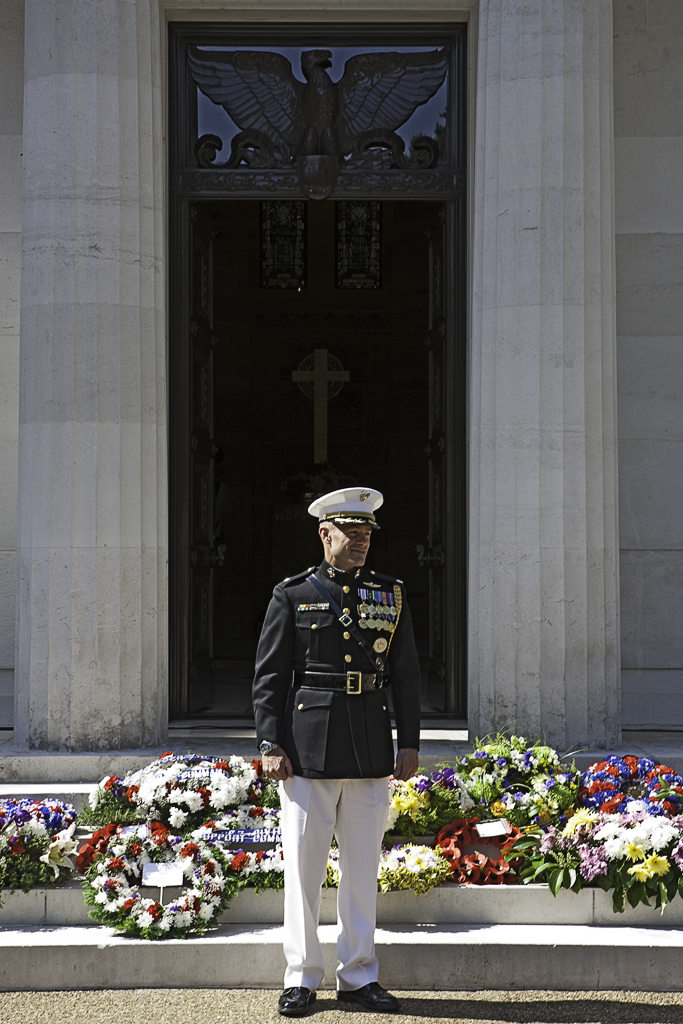
Observance 2009 – the Chapel is at the centre of services

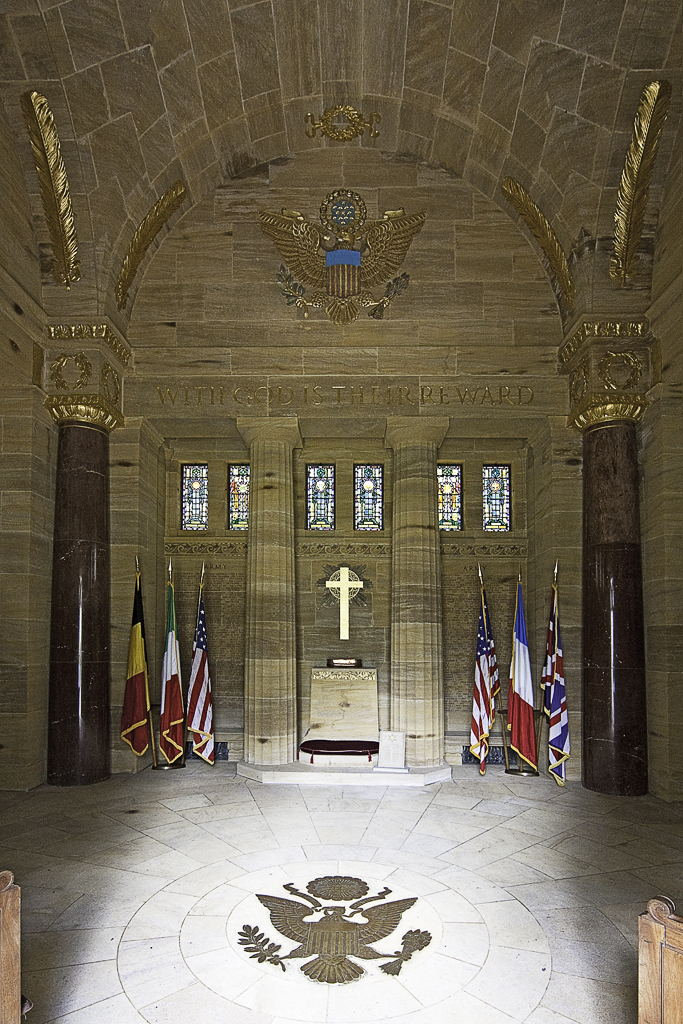
Chapel Interior

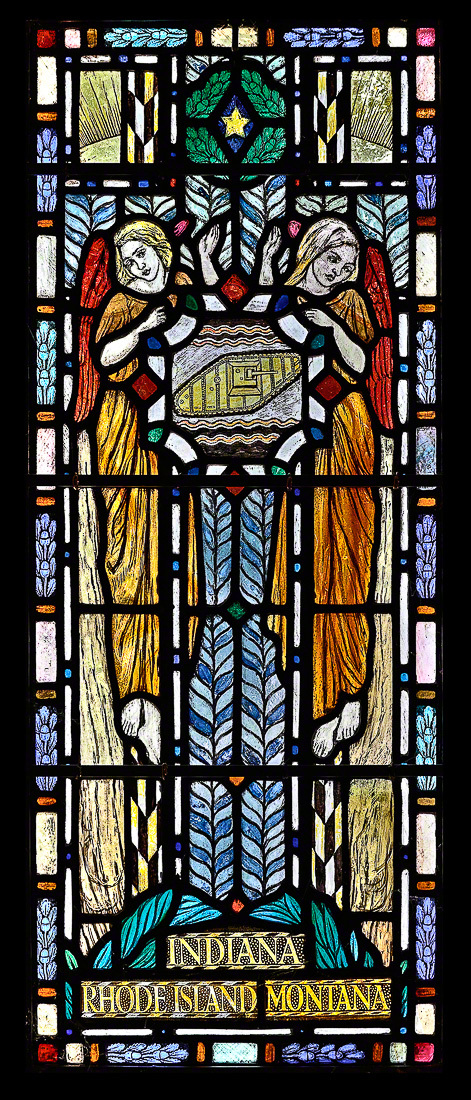
One of the Chapels 18 stained glass lights designed by Reginald Hallward

The chapel memorial was dedicated in 1929 and designed by Egerton Swartwout and Harry Bulkeley Creswell. It is located in the northwest side of the cemetery. Engraved above the entrance is the tribute “PERPETUAL LIGHT UPON THEM SHINES.” A classic white stone building of Portland limestone, quarried on the Isle of Portland, Dorset, the interior is decorated with religious, military and patriotic symbols. The interior has soft tan-hued stone, with an altar, two oak pews, flags and carved doorways. There are 18 stained glass windows designed by Reginald Hallward, each bearing the names of American States and Territories of 1918. There are unit insignia worked into the glass and the branches of service for the Army, Navy, Marine Corps and Coast Guard.

Engraved into the walls of the chapel are the names of 563 missing Americans. Most were lost at sea and their remains were never recovered or could not be positively identified. Included on the walls of the chapel are the names of all hands from the USCGC cutter Tampa. The cutter was in service for 11 months, until the night of 26 September 1918, when it was attacked in the Bristol Channel. All 115 hands, as well as 16 passengers, were lost. Another naval disaster was the USS Alcedo, a former pleasure yacht that was converted to a navy escort, and the first American ship lost in the war. It was struck by a torpedo on 17 December 1917 and lost 21 men. Also included on the wall are the names of the 11 men of the USCGC Seneca who were lost on 16 September 1918, while attempting to assist the steamship Wellington.

== Notable names ==
There are two Medal of Honor recipients honored at Brookwood American Cemetery. Gunner's Mate First Class Osmond Ingram was the first sailor to receive the award in World War I. On 15 October 1917, Ingram was serving on the USS Cassin. He spotted an incoming torpedo and attempted to release the ship's load of depth charges before the torpedo struck the ship on the aft side. The torpedo struck the ship before he could accomplish his purpose and Ingram was killed by the explosion. Ingram's body was never recovered; his name is engraved in gold on the wall of the chapel with other crewmen of the Cassin. Also honored is Medal of Honor recipient Gustav A. Sundquist, who fought in the Spanish–American War and who later drowned at sea on August 25, 1918.

== Gallery ==
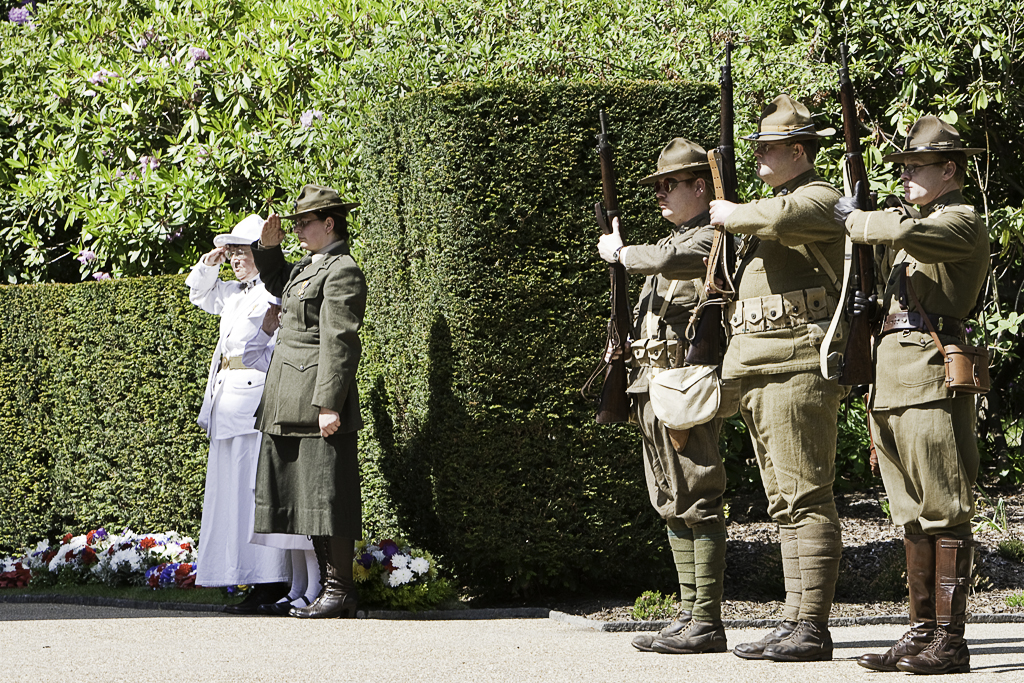
Observance 2009 – "Doughboys" & Nurses

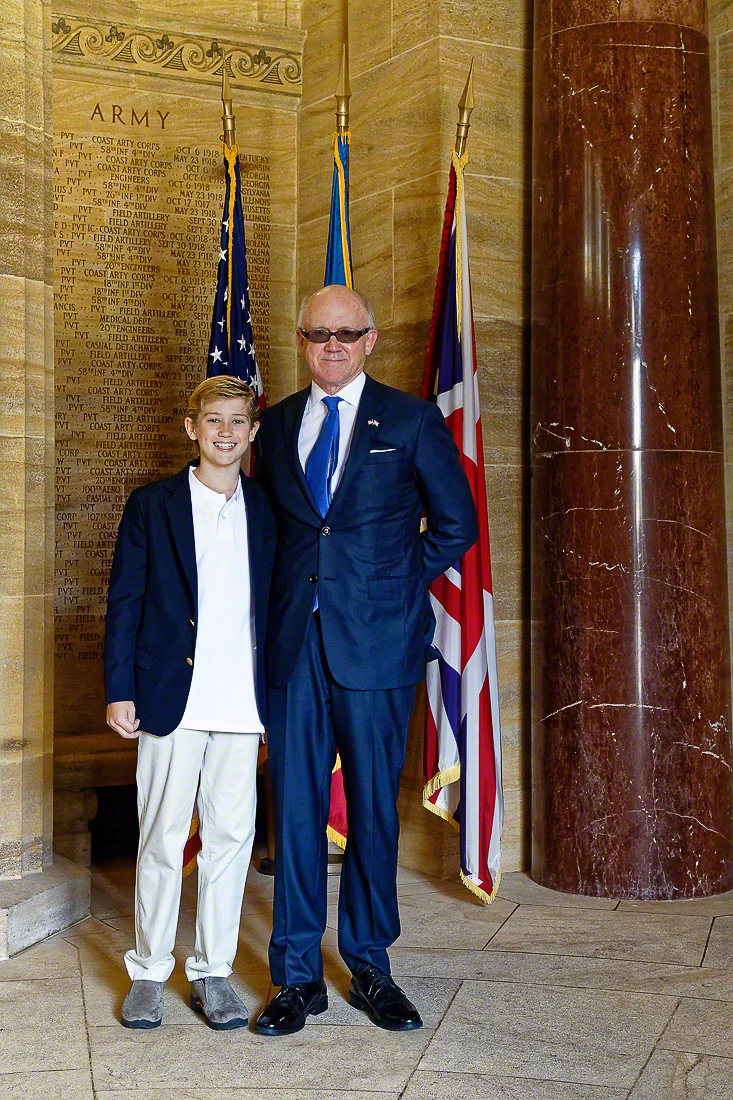
Robert "Woody" Johnson, US Ambassador to the UK, with his son 'Brick' Johnson, in the Chapel on Memorial Day 2018

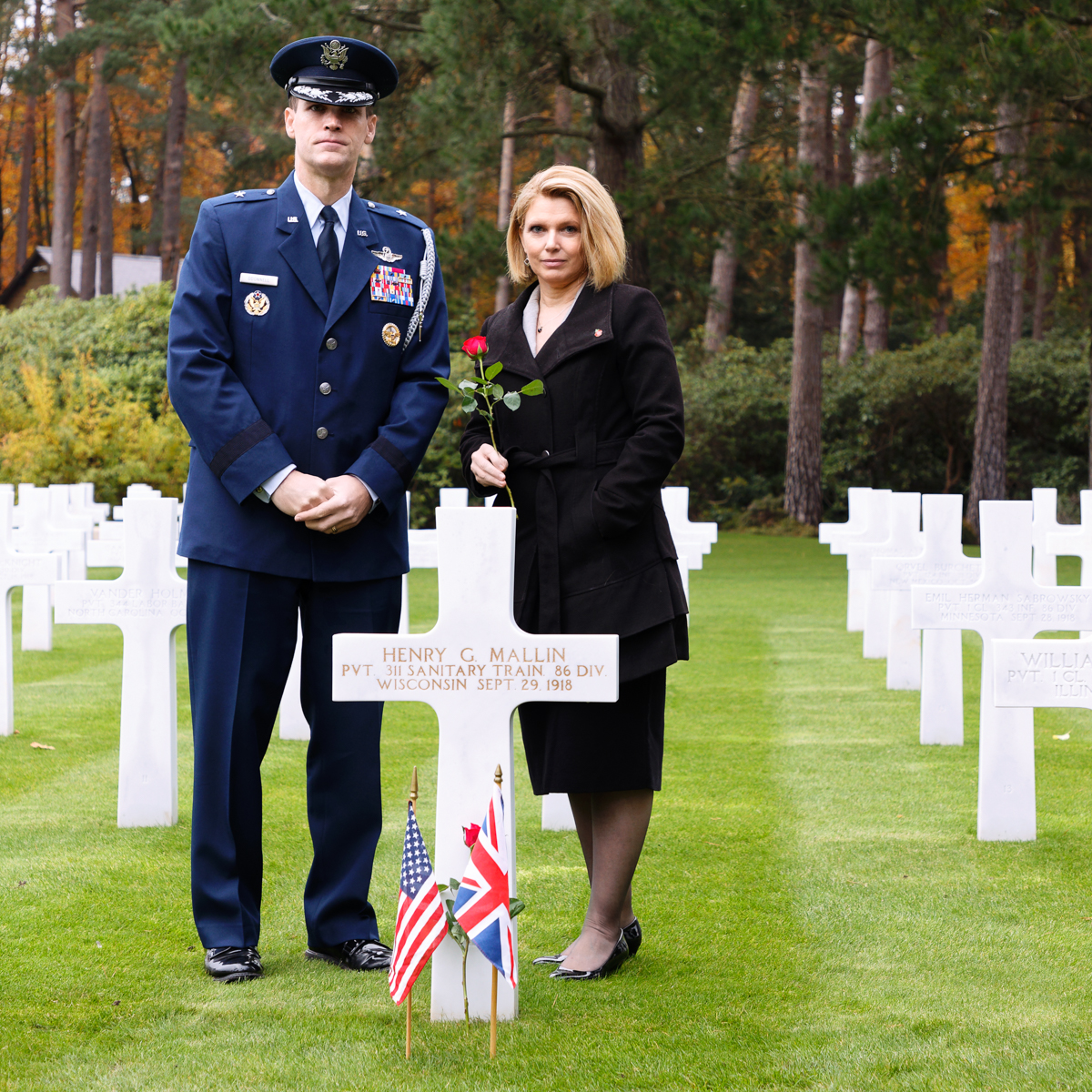
Brigadier General Jefferson J O'Donnell & Mrs Susan O'Donnell represent all prevented by Covid-19 from attending Veterans Day 2020

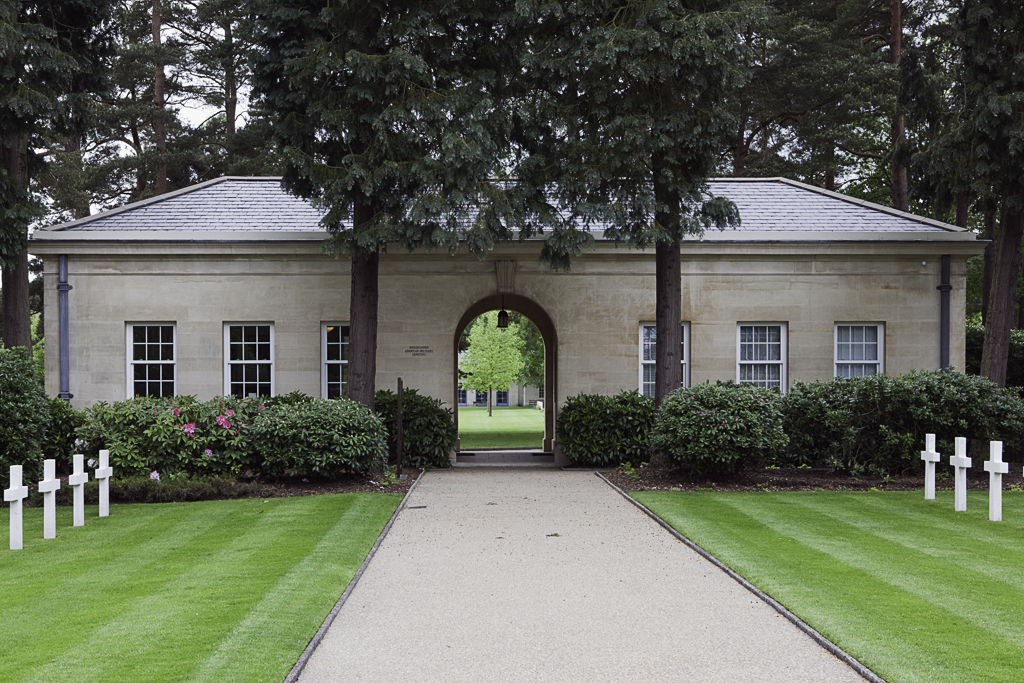
Visitor Reception Building

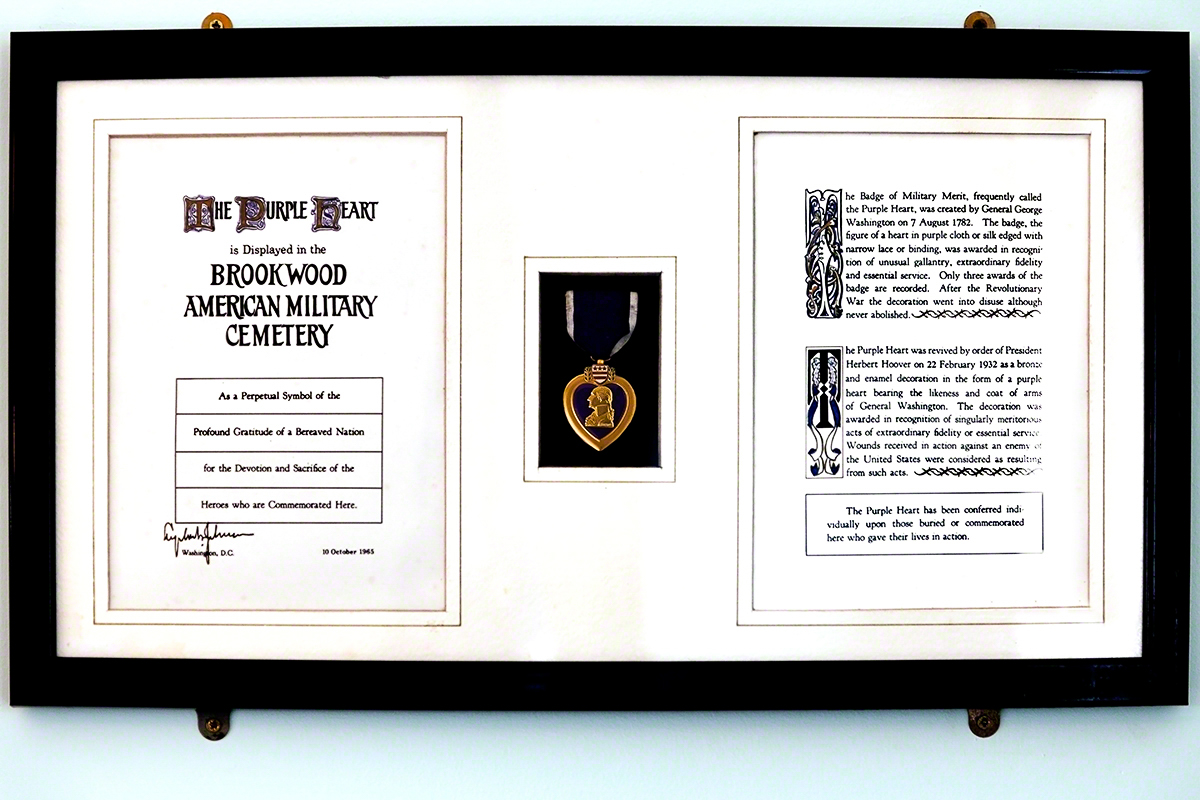
The Purple Heart on display in Brookwood American Cemetery
