= Gustaf A. Sundquist =

Swedish U.S. Navy sailor (1879–1918)

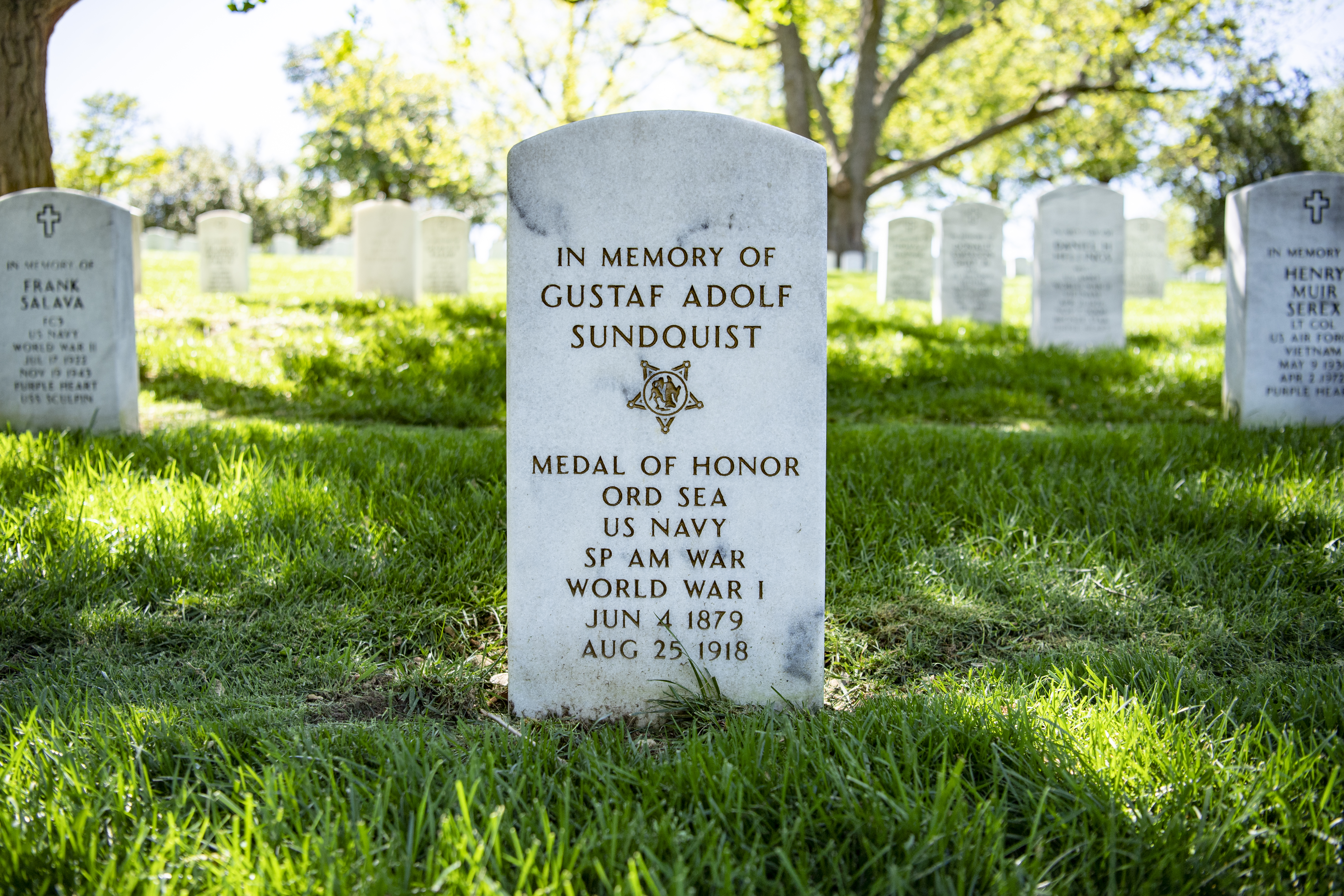
- Cenotaph at Arlington National Cemetery
- Born: June 4, 1879; Sweden
- Died: August 25, 1918 (aged 39); France
- Burial place: Brookwood American Cemetery and Memorial (ABMC) Brookwood, Surrey, England
- Military career
- Allegiance: United States
- Branch: United States Navy
- Rank: Ordinary Seaman
- Unit: USS Nashville
- Conflicts: Spanish–American War; World War I
- Awards: Medal of Honor

Gustaf Adolf Sundquist (June 4, 1879 – August 25, 1918) was an ordinary seaman serving in the United States Navy during the Spanish–American War who received the Medal of Honor for bravery.

== Biography ==
Sundquist was born June 4, 1879, in Sweden and after immigrating to the United States he entered the Navy. He was sent to fight in the Spanish–American War aboard the U.S.S. Nashville as an ordinary seaman.

After receiving the Medal of Honor for his actions during the Spanish–American War he retired from the Navy in 1900. He rejoined the Navy in World War I and served as a chief special mechanic. Sundquist was drowned in France on August 25, 1918, and declared missing in action. He has a cenotaph in Brookwood American Cemetery and Memorial (ABMC) Brookwood Surrey, England.

== Medal of Honor citation ==
Rank and organization: Ordinary Seaman, U.S. Navy. Born: 4 June 1879, Sweden. Accredited to: New York. G.O. No.: 529, 2 November 1899.

Citation:

On board the U.S.S. Nashville during the operation of cutting the cable leading from Cienfuegos, Cuba, 11 May 1898. Facing the heavy fire of the enemy, Sundquist displayed extraordinary bravery and coolness throughout this action.

== See also ==
- List of Medal of Honor recipients for the Spanish–American War
