= Corozal American Cemetery and Memorial =

ABMC cemetery in Panama

- American Battle Monuments Commission
- Used for those deceased
- Location: 8.98888°N 79.57240°W near Corozal, Panama
- Total burials: 5637

Burials by nation
- United States of America

Corozal American Cemetery and Memorial is located approximately three kilometres west of Panama City, Panama. It is in the city of Corozal and is the location of 5,637 American veterans and others. A paved walkway leads from the Visitors' Center to a small memorial that sits atop a knoll overlooking the graves area. The memorial was established in 1923 by Congress to remember people who served overseas. It consists of a paved plaza with a 4-metre rectangular granite obelisk flanked by two flagpoles on which fly the United States and Panamanian flags.

The plaza obelisk has engravings in Spanish and English. The English inscription reads:

THIS MEMORIAL HAS BEEN ERECTED BY THE UNITED STATES OF AMERICA IN HUMBLE TRIBUTE TO ALL INTERRED HERE WHO SERVED IN ITS ARMED FORCES OR CONTRIBUTED TO THE CONSTRUCTION, OPERATION AND MAINTENANCE OF THE PANAMA CANAL.

The American Battle Monuments Commission assumed responsibility for the care and maintenance of the Corozal American Cemetery in Panama in 1982. The cemetery is open Monday through Friday to the public from 09:00 to 16:00 except December 25 and January 1. It is open on weekends only to relatives who have family buried there. (Family members must present ID and proof of their relationship.) It is open on host country holidays. When the cemetery is open to the public, a staff member is on duty in the Visitors' Center to answer questions and escort relatives to grave and memorial sites.

== Corozal "Silver" Cemetery ==
The Corozal "Silver Roll" Cemetery is an area adjacent to the Corozal American Cemetery and Memorial. The Silver Cemetery was originally established as a segregated cemetery for the "Silver Roll" (Black people of West Indian origin) employees of the Panama Canal. In 2010 the Corozal "Silver" Cemetery was added as a World Monuments Fund (WMF) Watch Site.

== See also ==
- American Battle Monuments Commission
