= American Battle Monuments Commission =

U.S. government agency

Coordinates: 38°53′25″N 77°05′12″W

American Battle Monuments Commission (ABMC)
- Seal of the American Battle Monuments Commission

Agency overview
- Formed: 1923
- Type: Independent Agency of the United States Government
- Headquarters: 2300 Clarendon Blvd., Suite 500 Arlington, Virginia 22201
- Motto: "Time will not dim the glory of their deeds."
- Employees: 472 (2023)
- Annual budget: $73.1 million (2023)
- Agency executive: Robert J. Dalessandro, Acting Secretary
- Website: abmc.gov

The American Battle Monuments Commission (ABMC) is an independent agency of the United States government that administers, operates, and maintains permanent U.S. military cemeteries, memorials and monuments primarily outside the United States.

There were 26 cemeteries and 31 memorials, monuments and markers under the care of the ABMC. There are more than 140,000 U.S. servicemen and servicewomen interred at the cemeteries, and more than 94,000 missing in action, lost, or buried at sea are memorialized on cemetery Walls of the Missing and on three memorials in the United States. The ABMC also maintains an online database of names associated with each site.

== History ==
The ABMC was established by the United States Congress in 1923. Its purpose is to:

- Commemorate the services of the U.S. Armed Forces where they have served since April 6, 1917;
- Establish suitable war memorials; designing, constructing, operating, and maintaining permanent U.S. military burial grounds in foreign countries;
- Control the design and construction of U.S. military monuments and markers in foreign countries by other U.S. citizens and organizations, both public and private;
- Encourage the maintenance of such monuments and markers by their sponsors.

The United States Department of War established eight European burial grounds for World War I. The ABMC's first program was landscaping and erecting non-sectarian chapels at each of the eight sites, constructing 11 separate monuments and two tablets at other sites in Europe, and constructing the Allied Expeditionary Forces World War I Memorial in Washington, D.C. For those buried who could not be identified during World War I, a percentage were commemorated by Star of David markers, rather than a cross; this practice was not continued for those who could not be identified during World War II.

In 1934, President Franklin D. Roosevelt signed an executive order transferring control of the eight cemeteries to the ABMC, and made the commission responsible for the design, construction, maintenance and operation of all future permanent American military burial grounds outside the United States.

The ABMC has been the caretaker of cemeteries, monuments and memorials for World War I, World War II, the Korean War, the Vietnam War and the Mexican–American War. In 2013, Clark Veterans Cemetery in the Philippines became the 25th site under the control of the commission. Clark Veterans Cemetery dates back to the Philippine–American War at the turn of the 20th century. The Lafayette Escadrille Memorial Cemetery outside Paris, France, was added to the commission's responsibilities in 2017.

== Structure ==
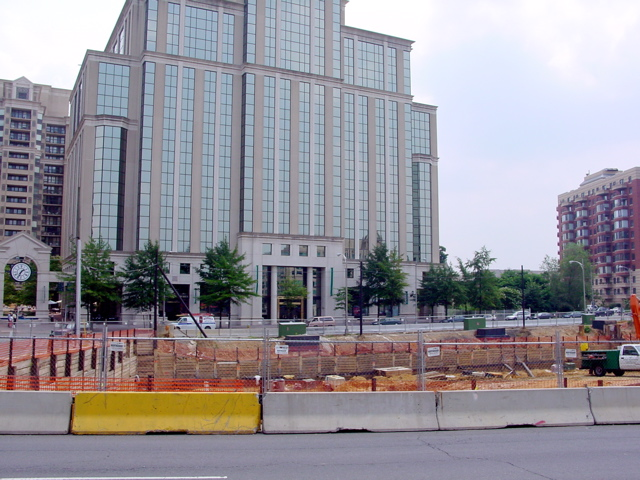
The ABMC's headquarters at 2300 Clarendon Boulevard in Arlington

The agency has its headquarters in Arlington, Virginia, and its Overseas Operations Office in Paris, France.

The authorizing legislation for the American Battle Monuments Commission (36 U.S.C., Chapter 21) specifies that the President may appoint up to 11 members to the commission (who serve indefinite terms and who serve without pay) and an officer of the Army to serve as the secretary.

=== Chairmen of the ABMC ===
- John J. Pershing (1923–1948)
- George C. Marshall (1949–1959)
- Jacob L. Devers (1960–1969)
- Mark W. Clark (1969–1984)
- Andrew Goodpaster (1985–1990)
- Paul X. Kelley (1991–1994, 2001–2005)
- Frederick F. Woerner Jr. (1994–2001)
- Frederick M. Franks Jr. (2005–2009)
- Merrill McPeak (2010–2018)
- David Urban (2018–2021)
- Mark Hertling (2021–2023)
- Michael X. Garrett (2023–present)

=== Secretaries of the ABMC ===
- Xenophon H. Price (1923–1938)
- Thomas North (1946–1968)
- Andrew J. Adams (1968–1992)
- Joseph A. Laposata (1994–1995)
- John P. Herrling (1995–2005)
- John W. Nicholson (2005–2009)
- Max Cleland (2009–2017)
- William Matz Jr. (2018–2021)
- Charles K. Djou (2022–2025)
- Robert J. Dalessandro (acting; 2025–present)

=== Board of Commissioners ===
ABMC's Presidentially-appointed commissioners are Michael X. Garrett; Florent Groberg; Christopher LaCivita; Kelly J. Roberts; Brooks D. Tucker; John Freeman; Dorothy (Deecy) Stephens Gray; David A. Warrington; David Bossie; and Michael D. Miller. Garrett was elected as chairman on August 1, 2023.

== Operations ==
The American Battle Monuments Commission employs a full-time staff of 472 people in 2023. All ABMC sites are open from 9 a.m. to 5 p.m., seven days a week, with the exception of Christmas Day and New Year's Day. Cemeteries are not closed for national holidays. When the sites are open to the public, a commission staff member is available to escort visitors and relatives to grave and memorial sites or to answer questions.

== Cemeteries and Memorials of the ABMC ==
Cemetery	Country	Conflict	Dedicated	Burials	MIA	Web
Aisne-Marne American Cemetery and Memorial	France	World War I	1937	2,289	1,060	Details
Ardennes American Cemetery and Memorial	Belgium	World War II	1960	5,323	463	Details
Brittany American Cemetery and Memorial	France	World War II	1956	4,409	498	Details
Brookwood American Cemetery and Memorial	United Kingdom	World War I	1937	468	563	Details
Cambridge American Cemetery and Memorial	United Kingdom	World War II	1956	3,812	5,127	Details
Clark Veterans Cemetery	Philippines	Philippine–American War and after	c. 1900; 2013 (with ABMC)	8,000+		Details
Corozal American Cemetery and Memorial	Panama	veterans of the Mexican–American War; American Civil War; World War I World War II	1914; 1982 (with ABMC)	5,450		Details
Epinal American Cemetery and Memorial	France	World War II	1944; 1956 (with ABMC)	5,255	424	Details
Flanders Field American Cemetery and Memorial	Belgium	World War I	1937	368	43	Details
Florence American Cemetery and Memorial	Italy	World War II	1960	4,402	1,409	Details
Henri-Chapelle American Cemetery and Memorial	Belgium	World War II	1960	7,992	450	Details
Lafayette Escadrille Cemetery and Memorial	France	World War I	1928; 2017 (with ABMC)	51	5	Details
Lorraine American Cemetery and Memorial	France	World War II	1960	10,489	444	Details
Luxembourg American Cemetery and Memorial	Luxembourg	World War II	1960	5,076	371	Details
Manila American Cemetery and Memorial	Philippines	World War II	1960	17,201	36,285	Details
Meuse-Argonne American Cemetery and Memorial	France	World War I	1937	14,246	954	Details
Mexico City National Cemetery	Mexico	Mexican–American War	1851	813	750	Details
Netherlands American Cemetery and Memorial	Netherlands	World War II	1960	8,301	1,722	Details
Normandy American Cemetery and Memorial	France	World War II	1956	9,387	1,557	Details
North Africa American Cemetery and Memorial	Tunisia	World War II	1960	2,841	3,724	Details
Oise-Aisne American Cemetery and Memorial	France	World War I	1937	6,012	241	Details
Rhone American Cemetery and Memorial	France	World War II	1956	860	294	Details
Sicily-Rome American Cemetery and Memorial	Italy	World War II	1956	7,861	3,095	Details
Somme American Cemetery and Memorial	France	World War I	1937	1,844	333	Details
St. Mihiel American Cemetery and Memorial	France	World War I	1937	4,153	284	Details
Suresnes American Cemetery and Memorial	France	World War I	1937	1,565	974	Details

== Monuments of the ABMC ==
Monument	Location	Country	Dedication	Battle	Web
Spanish–American War
Santiago Surrender Tree	Santiago de Cuba	Cuba	Site of the negotiation of the Spanish Gen. José Toral's surrender of Santiago de Cuba on July 13, 1898	Siege of Santiago	Details
World War I
Audenarde American Monument	Oudenaarde	Belgium	37th and 91st Divisions	October–November 1918	Details
Belleau Wood American Monument	Belleau	France	5th and 6th Marine Regiments	Battle of Belleau Wood	Details
Bellicourt American Monument	St. Quentin	France	27th and 30th Divisions	Battle of St. Quentin Canal	Details
Cantigny American Monument	Montdidier	France	28th Regiment of the First Army	Battle of Cantigny	Details
Château-Thierry American Monument	Château-Thierry	France	U.S. and French soldiers	Aisne-Marne Offensive and Oise-Aisne Offensive	Details
Chaumont AEF Headquarters Marker	Chaumont	France	American Expeditionary Forces led by General Pershing	Headquarters of the AEF, September 1, 1917, to July 11, 1919	Details
Kemmel American Monument	Ypres	Belgium	27th and 30th Divisions of the II Corps	Ypres-Lys Offensive; August 18 to September 4, 1918	Details
Meuse-Argonne American Memorial	Verdun	France	First Army and Second Army	Meuse-Argonne Offensive; September 26, 1918, to November 11, 1918	Details
Montsec American Monument	Saint-Mihiel	France	First Army; Second Army	September 12–16, 1918; November 9–11	Details
Naval Monument at Brest	Brest	France	the naval forces of the United States and France during World War I	Headquarters of the United States and French navies	Details
Naval Monument at Gibraltar	Straits of Gibraltar	Gibraltar	U.S. Navy and British Royal Navy for major victories	August 1917–November 11, 1918	Details
Sommepy American Monument	Sainte-Menehould	France	70,000 troops who drove the German army back north of the Aisne River: 42nd Division; 369th, 371st, and 372nd Infantry Regiments; 2nd and 36th Divisions; 36th Division	July 15–18, 1918; September 26-October 8 September 29-October 28; October 11–October 27	Details
Souilly American Headquarters Marker	Souilly	France	Marking the headquarters of the First Army during the last few months of the war	Meuse-Argonne Offensive	Details
Tours American Monument	Tours	France	24,000 civilians of the Services of Supply and 645,000 soldiers of the American Expeditionary Forces	*Constructed almost 1,000 miles of railway tracks; Assembled more than 1,500 locomotives and 18,000 rail cars; Managed hospitals with a capacity of 192,844 beds.	Details
World War II
Battle of the Bulge Monument	Bastogne	Belgium	U.S. soldiers wounded or killed in the Battle of the Bulge	Battle of the Bulge	Details
Cabanatuan American Memorial	Cabanatuan	Philippines	U.S. and Filipino victims of the Bataan Death March and Cabanatuan internment camps		Details
East Coast Memorial for the Missing	New York City	United States	4,611 U.S. sailors and service members lost in the Atlantic Ocean during the war	Battle of the Atlantic	Details
Guadalcanal American Memorial	Guadalcanal	Solomon Islands	U.S. soldiers and allies who died in the Battle of Guadalcanal	Guadalcanal campaign	Details
Honolulu Memorial	Honolulu, Hawaii	United States	Dedicated to the 18,096 U.S. World War II soldiers missing from the Pacific (excluding those from the southwest Pacific), 8,200 missing from the Korean War, and 2,504 from the Vietnam War		Details
Pointe du Hoc Ranger Monument	Saint-Laurent-sur-Mer	France	Second Ranger Battalion members who on June 6, 1944, scaled the 100 ft (30 m) cliff of Pointe du Hoc and seized German artillery that could have fired on the U.S. troops landing at Omaha and Utah beaches.	D-Day	Details
Papua American Marker	Papua	Papua New Guinea	U.S. soldiers who fought in Southwest Pacific theatre	South West Pacific theatre of World War II	Details
Saipan American Memorial	Saipan	Northern Mariana Islands	U.S. marines and soldiers (24,000) and Chamorro who died during the liberation of the Mariana Islands during World War II	Mariana and Palau Islands campaign	Details
Utah Beach American Monument	Ste-Marie-du-Mont	France	VII Corps members who liberated the Cotentin Peninsula	Battle of Cherbourg	Details
West Coast Memorial to the Missing	San Francisco	United States	417 U.S. sailors and service members lost in the Pacific Ocean theater	Pacific Ocean theater of World War II	Details
Western Naval Task Force Marker	Casablanca	Morocco	U.S. Western Task Force soldiers who made the first transoceanic amphibious operation	Operation Torch	Details
Korean War
United Nations Memorial Cemetery	Busan	South Korea	U.S. service members who fought in the Korean War	Korean War	Details

== See also ==
- American War Memorials Overseas
- National Register of Historic Places

=== Other national war graves commissions ===
- Austria – Austrian Black Cross (Austrian War graves on the Vienna Central cemetery are still looked after by German War Graves Commission)
- France – Ministère de la Défense
- Germany – German War Graves Commission
- Netherlands – Oorlogsgravenstichting (Dutch Wikipedia)
- Russia – Association of War Memorials
- United Kingdom, Canada, Australia, New Zealand, India and South Africa – Commonwealth War Graves Commission (CWGC)

== Bibliography ==
- American Battle Monuments Commission (1938). American armies and battlefields in Europe: a history, guide, and reference book. U.S.G.P.O.Selected photos available online through the Washington State Library's Classics in Washington History collection
- American Battle Monuments Commission (1938). American armies and battlefields in Europe: a history, guide, and reference book. U.S.G.P.O. Maps available online through the Washington State Office of the Secretary of State's Washington History collection
- Sledge, Michael (2005). Soldier Dead: How We Recover, Identify, Bury, and Honor Our Military Fallen. Columbia University Press. ISBN 0-231-13514-9. OCLC 81452881.
