= In Memoriam 2014 =

In Memoriam 2014 is a project which will provide greater protection for war memorials in the United Kingdom.

In Memoriam 2014 was unofficially launched to supporters in July and was formally launched in October 2011 in the House of Commons. The aim is to help prepare communities for remembrance of the start of The Great War in 1914. The project will locate and log memorials while offering them greater protection by marking them with SmartWater.

War Memorials Trust, a partner on the project, will benefit from improved information about memorial custodians, enabling the charity to contact them more efficiently when a problem is reported. Due to the increased awareness of war memorial issues that this campaign will create, it is hoped that the issue of protecting and conserving war memorials appropriately will be highlighted.
