= American War Memorials Overseas =

American non-profit organization

- AWMO Logo
- Founded: July 2008
- Founder: Lillian A. Pfluke
- Type: 501(c)(3) corporation
- Location(s): Wilmington, Delaware Paris, France
- Revenue: Individual contributions, corporate contributions, and private foundation grants
- Website: U.S. War Memorials

American War Memorials Overseas (AWMO) was founded in 2008 and is a non-profit corporation working to document, promote, and preserve non-government supported War Memorials honoring Americans outside of the United States. American War Memorials Overseas is a 501(c)(3) nonprofit corporation and as such is entirely dependent on donated funds.

== Mission ==
War Memorials commemorate our shared past, and overseas war memorials honoring Americans are a most important symbol of America's international engagement. American War Memorials Overseas works to document, promote, and preserve non-government supported war memorials honoring Americans outside of the USA to ensure these monuments remain part of local communities forever. The AWMO cooperates with other organizations, at international, national, and local levels, to safeguard the future of War Memorials honoring Americans overseas in both their social and historical context.

The U.S. federal government, via the American Battle Monuments Commission, cares for 24 overseas cemeteries and 25 memorials. They have neither the authority nor the resources to care for thousands of other sites honoring Americans worldwide.

American War Memorials Overseas has the following objectives regarding these other sites:

- Record the existence and location of non-government supported war memorials honoring Americans overseas and make this information available to the public.
- Encourage cultural tourism to visit these historical sites.
- Encourage and facilitate local communities to fly the American flag over private war memorials honoring Americans.
- Monitor the condition of these war memorials, and encourage their conservation.
- Provide expert advice to those involved in war memorial projects, and facilitate maintenance projects for sponsoring organizations.
- Work with communities and organizations to encourage local responsibility for war memorials, and to recognize the need to conduct restoration work on these monuments as required.
- Build a greater understanding of war memorial heritage and raise awareness of the issues surrounding war memorial conservation.

These objectives are published in the Army Magazine.

The American War Memorials Overseas lasting goal is not only to have documented all war memorials that honor Americans in countries outside the United States, but most importantly, to preserve those memorials so that they will last forever. The AWMO cooperates with other organizations, at international, national, and local levels, to fix memorials that are in disrepair and to safeguard the future of such memorials.

== Documentation ==
Thousands of American war memorials exist throughout the world. An American war memorial overseas is any permanent object put in place in an overseas location to commemorate Americans involved in or affected by a conflict or war in that area. These war memorials can be put in place by military units or veterans organizations to remember their fallen compatriots. They can be erected by family members to commemorate their loved ones or mark the spot where they fell. They can be installed by local organizations to recall the historical events in the area or as appreciation to their liberators. They can be constructed by the host nation as an official appreciation of the contributions of the United States of America and her citizens."

In most cases, neither the United States government nor local governments have the responsibility or the resources to document and maintain these sites. Many of these have been forgotten over time and their existence lost in the memory of former generations. The AWMO has been documenting and compiling an online database to search for such memorials. These include isolated burial sites of American combatants, monuments, and museums.

Over one thousand American war dead lie in churchyards, foreign cemeteries, or in the fields where they fell in overseas locations throughout the world. Often these gravesites are unmaintained and undocumented. The AWMO works to locate, document, and preserve these scattered burials.

At almost every location where Americans have fought overseas, in addition to the 25 federal monuments, many non-federal monuments commemorate their sacrifice. These sites are often little-known and poorly maintained. There are also simple markers and plaques which document the location of specific American actions on every European battlefield. These locations include the limits of advance of American combat divisions, the crash site where an American aircraft went down, or the exact location where an American service member was killed. The AWMO works to identify, document, and preserve these monuments, markers and plaques.

== Board of directors ==
The non-profit works solely on the basis of volunteers.

- Founder: Lillian A. Pfluke
- Dr. Susan Kellett-Forsyth
- Peter F. Herrly
- Christine Murakami

== See also ==
- American Battle Monuments Commission
- Commonwealth War Graves Commission
- Register of Culturally Significant Property
