= Harry Bulkeley Creswell =

British architect and author

- Born: 18 May 1869
- Died: 4 July 1960 (aged 91)
- Other names: Karshish
- Occupation(s): British architect and author

Harry Bulkeley Creswell FRIBA (1869–1960), was a British architect and author.

== Biography ==
Born on 18 May 1869, Harry Creswell was educated at Bedford School and at Trinity College, Dublin. He was articled to Sir Aston Webb RA in 1890, before establishing his own architectural practice in 1899. He was an Inspecting Engineer for the Crown Agents to the Colonies and designed the turbine factory in Queensferry, Flintshire, built between 1901 and 1906 and described by Edward Hubbard as a rare English precursor of Functionalism, Brookwood American Cemetery and Memorial (in association with Egerton Swartwout), and the New Parthenon Room at the British Museum.

Creswell was the author of a number of novels, including Thomas (1918), Thomas Settles Down (1919), The Honeywood File (1929) The Honeywood Settlement (1930), Jago versus Swillerton and Toomer (1931), Diary from a Dustbin (1935), Grig (1942), and Grig in Retirement (1943). He wrote two children's books: Marytary (1928) and Johnny and Marytary (1936). He was also a contributor to the Architectural Review, the Architects' Journal, Black and White and Punch, writing under the pseudonym Karshish.

Harry Creswell died on 4 July 1960.
