= List of new members of the 114th United States Congress =

The 114th United States Congress began on January 3, 2015. There were 13 new senators (one Democrat, 12 Republicans) and 59 new representatives (15 Democrats, 44 Republicans), as well as two new delegates (one Democrat, one Republican), at the start of its first session. Additionally, seven representatives (two Democrats, five Republicans) took office on various dates in order to fill vacancies during the 114th Congress before it ended on January 3, 2017.

The president of the House Democratic freshman class was Ted Lieu of California, while the president of the House Republican freshman class was Ken Buck of Colorado. Additionally, the Republican's freshmen liaison was Mimi Walters of California.

== Senate ==
State	Image	Senator	Seniority	Switched party	Prior background	Birth year	Ref
Alaska		Dan Sullivan (R)	13th (100th overall)	Yes; Defeated Mark Begich (D)	Alaska Commissioner of Natural Resources; Alaska Attorney General; Assistant Secretary of State (EBA); U.S. Marine Corps Reserve Colonel	1964	
Arkansas		Tom Cotton (R)	6th (93rd overall)	Yes; Defeated Mark Pryor (D)	U.S. House of Representatives (Note: Elected to the 113th Congress, serving from 2013 to 2015 in Arkansas's 4th district.); U.S. Army Captain	1977	
Colorado		Cory Gardner (R)	4th (91st overall)	Yes; Defeated Mark Udall (D)	U.S. House of Representatives (Note: Elected to the 112th Congress, serving from 2011 to 2015 in Colorado's 4th district.); Colorado House of Representatives	1974	
Georgia		David Perdue (R)	9th (96th overall)	No; Open seat; replaced Saxby Chambliss (R)	Georgia Ports Authority; CEO of Dollar General; CEO of Reebok	1949	
Iowa		Joni Ernst (R)	11th (98th overall)	Yes; Open seat; replaced Tom Harkin (D)	Iowa Senate; Montgomery County Auditor; U.S. Army Lieutenant Colonel	1970	
Louisiana		Bill Cassidy (R)	3rd (90th overall)	Yes; Defeated Mary Landrieu (D)	U.S. House of Representatives (Note: Elected to the 111th Congress, serving from 2009 to 2015 in Louisiana's 6th district.); Louisiana State Senate; Physician	1957	
Michigan		Gary Peters (D)	2nd (89th overall)	No; Open seat; replaced Carl Levin (D)	U.S. House of Representatives (Note: Elected to the 111th Congress, serving from 2009 to 2013 in Michigan's 9th district and from 2013 to 2015 in Michigan's 14th district.); Michigan Lottery Commissioner; Michigan Senate; Rochester Hills City Council; Navy Supply Corps Lieutenant Commander	1958	
Montana		Steve Daines (R)	7th (94th overall)	Yes; Replaced John Walsh (D), who withdrew after the primary	U.S. House of Representatives (Note: Elected to the 113th Congress, serving from 2013 to 2015 in Montana's at-large district.)	1962	
Nebraska		Ben Sasse (R)	12th (99th overall)	No; Open seat; replaced Mike Johanns (R)	President of Midland University; Assistant Secretary for Planning and Evaluation	1972	
North Carolina		Thom Tillis (R)	10th (97th overall)	Yes; Defeated Kay Hagan (D)	Speaker of the North Carolina House of Representatives; Cornelius Board of Commissioners	1960	
Oklahoma		James Lankford (R)	5th (92nd overall)	No; Open seat; replaced Tom Coburn (R)	U.S. House of Representatives (Note: Elected to the 112th Congress, serving from 2011 to 2015 in Oklahoma's 5th district.); Baptist General Convention of Oklahoma	1968	
South Dakota		Mike Rounds (R)	8th (95th overall)	Yes; Open seat; replaced Tim Johnson (D)	Governor of South Dakota; Majority Leader of the South Dakota Senate	1954	
West Virginia		Shelley Moore Capito (R)	1st (88th overall)	Yes; Open seat; replaced Jay Rockefeller (D)	U.S. House of Representatives (Note: Elected to the 107th Congress, serving from 2001 to 2015 in West Virginia's 2nd district.); West Virginia House of Delegates	1953	

== House of Representatives ==
=== Took office January 3, 2015 ===
District	Image	Representative	Switched party	Prior background	Birth year	Ref
Alabama 6		Gary Palmer (R)	No; Open seat; replaced Spencer Bachus (R)	President of the Alabama Policy Institute; President of the State Policy Network	1954	
Arizona 2		Martha McSally (R)	Yes; Defeated Ron Barber (D)	U.S. Air Force Colonel	1966	
Arizona 7		Ruben Gallego (D)	No; Open seat; replaced Ed Pastor (D)	Arizona House of Representatives; U.S. Marine Corps Reserve Corporal	1979	
Arkansas 2		French Hill (R)	No; Open seat; replaced Tim Griffin (R)	Secretary to the National Economic Council; Deputy Assistant Secretary of the Treasury; Aide to U.S. Senator John Tower	1956	
Arkansas 4		Bruce Westerman (R)	No; Open seat; replaced Tom Cotton (R)	Majority Leader of the Arkansas House of Representatives; Fountain Lake School Board	1967	
California 11		Mark DeSaulnier (D)	No; Open seat; replaced George Miller (D)	California State Senate; California State Assembly; Contra Costa County Board of Supervisors; Concord City Council	1952	
California 25		Steve Knight (R)	No; Open seat; replaced Buck McKeon (R)	California State Senate; California State Assembly; Palmdale City Council; Los Angeles Police Department; U.S. Army Reserve	1966	
California 31		Pete Aguilar (D)	Yes; Open seat; replaced Gary Miller (R)	Mayor of Redlands; Aide to Governor Gray Davis	1979	
California 33		Ted Lieu (D)	No; Open seat; replaced Henry Waxman (D)	California State Senate; California State Assembly; Torrance City Council; U.S. Air Force JAG Corps Colonel	1969	
California 35		Norma Torres (D)	No; Open seat; replaced Gloria Negrete McLeod (D)	California State Senate; California State Assembly; Mayor of Pomona	1965	
California 45		Mimi Walters (R)	No; Open seat; replaced John Campbell (R)	California State Senate; California State Assembly; Laguna Niguel City Council	1962	
Colorado 4		Ken Buck (R)	No; Open seat; replaced Cory Gardner (R)	Weld County District Attorney; Congressional staffer	1959	
Florida 2		Gwen Graham (D)	Yes; Defeated Steve Southerland (R)	Lawyer	1963	
Florida 26		Carlos Curbelo (R)	Yes; Defeated Joe Garcia (D)	Miami-Dade County Public School Board; Staffer for U.S. Senator George LeMieux	1980	
Georgia 1		Buddy Carter (R)	No; Open seat; replaced Jack Kingston (R)	Georgia State Senate; Georgia House of Representatives; Mayor of Pooler; Pooler City Council	1957	
Georgia 10		Jody Hice (R)	No; Open seat; replaced Paul Broun (R)	Senior pastor	1960	
Georgia 11		Barry Loudermilk (R)	No; Open seat; replaced Phil Gingrey (R)	Georgia State Senate; Georgia House of Representatives; Chair of the Bartow County Republican Party; U.S. Air Force	1963	
Georgia 12		Rick Allen (R)	Yes; Defeated John Barrow (D)	Construction business owner	1951	
Hawaii 1		Mark Takai (D)	No; Open seat; replaced Colleen Hanabusa (D)	Hawaii House of Representatives; Hawaii National Guard Lieutenant Colonel	1967	
Illinois 10		Bob Dold (R)	Yes; Defeated Brad Schneider (D)	U.S. House of Representatives (Note: Previously elected to the 112th Congress, serving from 2011 to 2013.); Staffer for Vice President Dan Quayle	1969	
Illinois 12		Mike Bost (R)	Yes; Defeated William Enyart (D)	Illinois House of Representatives; Murphysboro Township Treasurer; U.S. Marine Corps	1960	
Iowa 1		Rod Blum (R)	Yes; Open seat; replaced Bruce Braley (D)	Software business executive	1955	
Iowa 3		David Young (R)	No; Open seat; replaced Tom Latham (R)	Chief of staff for U.S. Senator Chuck Grassley; Chief of staff for U.S. Senator Jim Bunning	1968	
Louisiana 5		Ralph Abraham (R)	No; Defeated Vance McAllister (R)	Aviation medical examiner Mississippi National Guard	1954	
Louisiana 6		Garret Graves (R)	No; Open seat; replaced Bill Cassidy (R)	Chair of the Louisiana CPRA; Staffer for U.S. Senator David Vitter; Staffer for U.S. Senator John Breaux	1972	
Maine 2		Bruce Poliquin (R)	Yes; Open seat; replaced Mike Michaud (D)	Maine State Treasurer	1953	
Massachusetts 6		Seth Moulton (D)	No; Defeated John F. Tierney (D) in a primary	U.S. Marine Corps Captain	1978	
Michigan 4		John Moolenaar (R)	No; Open seat; replaced Dave Camp (R)	Michigan Senate; Michigan House of Representatives; Midland City Council	1961	
Michigan 8		Mike Bishop (R)	No; Open seat; replaced Mike Rogers (R)	Majority Leader of the Michigan Senate; Michigan House of Representatives	1967	
Michigan 11		Dave Trott (R)	No; Defeated Kerry Bentivolio (R) in a primary	Bingham Farms Village Council; Business owner	1960	
Michigan 12		Debbie Dingell (D)	No; Open seat; replaced John Dingell (D)	Wayne State University Board of Governors	1953	
Michigan 14		Brenda Lawrence (D)	No; Open seat; replaced Gary Peters (D)	Mayor of Southfield; Southfield City Council; U.S. Postal Service	1954	
Minnesota 6		Tom Emmer (R)	No; Open seat; replaced Michele Bachmann (R)	Minnesota House of Representatives; Delano City Council; Independence City Council	1961	
Montana at-large		Ryan Zinke (R)	No; Open seat; replaced Steve Daines (R)	Montana Senate; U.S. Navy SEAL Team Six	1961	
Nebraska 2		Brad Ashford (D)	Yes; Defeated Lee Terry (D)	Nebraska Legislature; CEO of the Omaha Housing Authority; Nebraska Department of Education	1949	
Nevada 4		Cresent Hardy (R)	Yes; Defeated Steven Horsford (D)	Nevada Assembly; Mesquite City Council	1957	
New Hampshire 1		Frank Guinta (R)	Yes; Defeated Carol Shea-Porter (D)	U.S. House of Representatives (Note: Previously elected to the 112th Congress, serving from 2011 to 2013.); Mayor of Manchester; Manchester Board of Aldermen; New Hampshire House of Representatives	1970	
New Jersey 3		Tom MacArthur (R)	No; Open seat; replaced Jon Runyan (R)	Mayor of Randolph	1960	
New Jersey 12		Bonnie Watson Coleman (D)	No; Open seat; replaced Rush Holt Jr. (D)	Majority Leader of the New Jersey General Assembly; Chair of the New Jersey Democratic State Committee	1945	
New York 1		Lee Zeldin (R)	Yes; Defeated Tim Bishop (D)	New York State Senate; U.S. Army Lieutenant Colonel	1980	
New York 4		Kathleen Rice (D)	No; Open seat; replaced Carolyn McCarthy (D)	Nassau County District Attorney	1965	
New York 21		Elise Stefanik (R)	Yes; Open seat; replaced Bill Owens (D)	Staffer for the U.S. Domestic Policy Council; Campaign manager	1984	
New York 24		John Katko (R)	Yes; Defeated Dan Maffei (D)	Assistant U.S. Attorney; U.S. Securities and Exchange Commission	1962	
North Carolina 6		Mark Walker (R)	No; Open seat; replaced Howard Coble (R)	Businessman	1969	
North Carolina 7		David Rouzer (R)	Yes; Open seat; replaced Mike McIntyre (D)	North Carolina Senate; Legislative aide to U.S. Senator Elizabeth Dole	1972	
Oklahoma 5		Steve Russell (R)	No; Open seat; replaced James Lankford (R)	Oklahoma Senate; U.S. Army Lieutenant Colonel	1963	
Pennsylvania 6		Ryan Costello (R)	No; Open seat; replaced Jim Gerlach (R)	Chester County Board of Commissioners; Chester County Recorder of Deeds	1976	
Pennsylvania 13		Brendan Boyle (D)	No; Open seat; replaced Allyson Schwartz (D)	Pennsylvania House of Representatives	1977	
Texas 4		John Ratcliffe (R)	No; Defeated Ralph Hall (R) in a primary	Mayor of Heath; U.S. Attorney for Eastern Texas	1965	
Texas 23		Will Hurd (R)	Yes; Defeated Pete Gallego (D)	CIA Directorate of Operations	1977	
Texas 36		Brian Babin (R)	No; Open seat; replaced Steve Stockman (R)	Lower Neches Valley Authority; Texas Historical Commission; Mayor of Woodville; U.S. Air Force	1948	
Utah 4		Mia Love (R)	Yes; Open seat; replaced Jim Matheson (D)	Mayor of Saratoga Springs; Saratoga Springs City Council	1975	
Virginia 8		Don Beyer (D)	No; Open seat; replaced Jim Moran (D)	U.S. Ambassador to Switzerland and Liechtenstein; Lieutenant Governor of Virginia	1950	
Virginia 10		Barbara Comstock (R)	No; Open seat; replaced Frank Wolf (R)	Virginia House of Delegates; U.S. Department of Justice official Congressional staffer	1959	
Washington 4		Dan Newhouse (R)	No; Open seat; replaced Doc Hastings (R)	Washington Director of Agriculture; Washington House of Representatives	1955	
West Virginia 2		Alex Mooney (R)	No; Open seat; replaced Shelley Moore Capito (R)	Chair of the Maryland Republican Party; Maryland Senate	1971	
West Virginia 3		Evan Jenkins (R)	Yes; Defeated Nick Rahall (D)	West Virginia Senate; West Virginia House of Delegates	1960	
Wisconsin 6		Glenn Grothman (R)	No; Open seat; replaced Tom Petri (R)	Wisconsin Senate; Wisconsin State Assembly	1955	

==== Non-voting delegates ====
District	Image	Delegate	Switched party	Prior background	Birth year	Ref
American Samoa at-large		Amata Coleman Radewagen (R)	Yes; Defeated Eni Faleomavaega (D)	WHIAANHPI; Staffer for the House Republican Conference	1947	
U.S. Virgin Islands at-large		Stacey Plaskett (D)	No; Open seat; replaced Donna Christian-Christensen (D)	U.S. Department of Justice Civil Division; Bronx County assistant district attorney	1966	

=== Took office during the 114th Congress ===
District	Image	Representative	Took office	Switched party	Prior background	Birth year	Ref
New York 11		Dan Donovan (R)	May 12, 2015	No; Succeeded Michael Grimm (R)	Richmond County District Attorney; Deputy Borough President of Staten Island; New York County assistant district attorney	1956	
Mississippi 1		Trent Kelly (R)	June 2, 2015	No; Succeeded Alan Nunnelee (R)	District Attorney; Tupelo City Prosecutor; U.S. Army Major General	1966	
Illinois 18		Darin LaHood (R)	September 17, 2015	No; Succeeded Aaron Schock (R)	Illinois Senate; Tazewell County Prosecutor	1968	
Ohio 8		Warren Davidson (R)	June 9, 2016	No; Succeeded John Boehner (R)	Business owner U.S. Army Captain	1970	
Hawaii 1		Colleen Hanabusa (D)	November 14, 2016	No; Succeeded Mark Takai (D)	U.S. House of Representatives (Note: Previously elected to the 112th Congress, serving from 2011 to 2015.); President of the Hawaii Senate	1951	
Kentucky 1		James Comer (R)	November 14, 2016	No; Succeeded Ed Whitfield (R)	Kentucky Agriculture Commissioner; Kentucky House of Representatives; Chair of the Monroe County Republican Party	1972	
Pennsylvania 2		Dwight Evans (D)	November 14, 2016	No; Succeeded Chaka Fattah (D)	Pennsylvania House of Representatives	1954	

== See also ==
- List of United States representatives in the 114th Congress
- List of United States senators in the 114th Congress

== Notes ==
Preceded by New members of the 113th Congress	New members of the 114th Congress; 2015–2017	Succeeded by New members of the 115th Congress
