= List of new members of the 113th United States Congress =

The 113th United States Congress began on January 3, 2013. There were 12 new senators (eight Democrats, three Republicans, one independent) and 81 new representatives (47 Democrats, 34 Republicans) at the start of its first session. Additionally, five senators (four Democrats, one Republican) and 11 representatives (four Democrats, seven Republicans) took office on various dates in order to fill vacancies during the 113th Congress before it ended on January 3, 2015.

Due to redistricting after the 2010 census, 19 representatives were elected from newly established congressional districts.

The co-presidents of the House Democratic freshman class were Matt Cartwright of Pennsylvania, Joaquin Castro of Texas, John Delaney of Maryland, and Michelle Lujan Grisham of New Mexico, while the president of the House Republican freshman class was Luke Messer of Indiana. Additionally, the Republican's freshmen liaison was Ann Wagner of Missouri.

== Senate ==
=== Took office January 3, 2013 ===
State	Image	Senator	Seniority	Switched party	Prior background	Birth year	Ref
Arizona		Jeff Flake (R)	2nd (90th overall)	No; Open seat; replaced Jon Kyl (R)	U.S. House of Representatives (Note: Elected to the 107th Congress, serving from 2001 to 2003 in Arizona's 1st district and from 2003 to 2013 in Arizona's 6th district.)	1962	
Connecticut		Chris Murphy (D)	4th (92nd overall)	Yes; Open seat; replaced Joe Lieberman (I)	U.S. House of Representatives (Note: Elected to the 110th Congress, serving from 2007 to 2013 in Connecticut's 5th district.); Connecticut State Senate; Connecticut House of Representatives	1973	
Hawaii		Mazie Hirono (D)	5th (93rd overall)	No; Open seat; replaced Daniel Akaka (D)	U.S. House of Representatives (Note: Elected to the 110th Congress, serving from 2007 to 2013 in Hawaii's 2nd district.); Lieutenant Governor of Hawaii; Hawaii House of Representatives	1947	
Indiana		Joe Donnelly (D)	3rd (91st overall)	Yes; Replaced Richard Lugar (R), who was defeated in a primary	U.S. House of Representatives (Note: Elected to the 110th Congress, serving from 2007 to 2013 in Indiana's 2nd district.)	1955	
Maine		Angus King (I)	7th (95th overall)	Yes; Open seat; replaced Olympia Snowe (R)	Governor of Maine	1944	
Massachusetts		Elizabeth Warren (D)	10th (98th overall)	Yes; Defeated Scott Brown (R)	Special advisor to the CFPB; Professor	1949	
Nebraska		Deb Fischer (R)	11th (99th overall)	Yes; Open seat; replaced Ben Nelson (D)	Nebraska Legislature	1951	
New Mexico		Martin Heinrich (D)	6th (94th overall)	No; Open seat; replaced Jeff Bingaman (D)	U.S. House of Representatives (Note: Elected to the 111th Congress, serving from 2009 to 2013 in New Mexico's 1st district.); Albuquerque City Council	1971	
North Dakota		Heidi Heitkamp (D–NPL)	12th (100th overall)	No; Open seat; replaced Kent Conrad (D–NPL)	North Dakota Attorney General; North Dakota Tax Commissioner; Dakota Gasification Company	1955	
Texas		Ted Cruz (R)	9th (97th overall)	No; Open seat; replaced Kay Bailey Hutchison (R)	Solicitor General of Texas; Policy advisor for President George W. Bush	1970	
Virginia		Tim Kaine (D)	8th (96th overall)	No; Open seat; replaced Jim Webb (D)	Governor of Virginia; Lieutenant Governor of Virginia; Mayor of Richmond; Richmond City Council	1958	
Wisconsin		Tammy Baldwin (D)	1st (89th overall)	No; Open seat; replaced Herb Kohl (D)	U.S. House of Representatives (Note: Elected to the 106th Congress, serving from 1999 to 2013 in Wisconsin's 2nd district.); Wisconsin State Assembly; Dane County Board of Supervisors; Madison Common Council	1962	

=== Took office during the 113th Congress ===
State	Image	Senator	Took office	Switched party	Prior background	Birth year	Ref
Massachusetts		Mo Cowan (D)	February 1, 2013	No; Appointed; replaced John Kerry (D)	Chief of staff to Governor Deval Patrick	1969	
New Jersey		Jeffrey Chiesa (R)	June 10, 2013	Yes; Appointed; replaced Frank Lautenberg (D)	New Jersey Attorney General; Assistant U.S. Attorney	1965	
Massachusetts		Ed Markey (D)	July 16, 2013	No; Open seat; replaced Mo Cowan (D)	U.S. House of Representatives (Note: Elected to the 94th Congress, serving from 1976 to 2013 in Massachusetts's 7th district, and from February to July 2013 in Massachusetts's 5th district.); Massachusetts House of Representatives; U.S. Army Reserve Specialist	1946	
New Jersey		Cory Booker (D)	October 31, 2013	Yes; Open seat; replaced Jeffrey Chiesa (R)	Mayor of Newark; Municipal Council of Newark	1969	
Montana		John Walsh (D)	February 9, 2014	No; Appointed; replaced Max Baucus (D)	Lieutenant Governor of Montana; Montana Adjutant General; U.S. Army Brigadier General	1960	

== House of Representatives ==
=== Took office January 3, 2013 ===
District	Image	Representative	Switched party	Prior background	Birth year	Ref
Arizona 1		Ann Kirkpatrick (D)	New seat	U.S. House of Representatives (Note: Previously elected to the 111th Congress, serving from 2009 to 2011.); Arizona House of Representatives	1950	
Arizona 5		Matt Salmon (R)	No; Open seat; replaced Jeff Flake (R)	U.S. House of Representatives (Note: Previously elected to the 104th Congress, serving from 1995 to 2001 in the 1st district.); Chair of the Arizona Republican Party; Arizona Senate	1958	
Arizona 9		Kyrsten Sinema (D)	New seat	Arizona Senate; Arizona House of Representatives	1976	
Arkansas 4		Tom Cotton (R)	Yes; Open seat; replaced Mike Ross (D)	Lawyer; U.S. Army Captain	1977	
California 1		Doug LaMalfa (R)	No; Open seat; replaced Wally Herger (R)	California State Senate; California State Assembly	1960	
California 2		Jared Huffman (D)	No; Open seat; replaced Lynn Woolsey (D)	California State Assembly; Marin Municipal Water District	1964	
California 7		Ami Bera (D)	Yes; Defeated Dan Lungren (R)	CMO for Sacramento County; Physician	1965	
California 8		Paul Cook (R)	No; Open seat; replaced Jerry Lewis (R)	California State Assembly; Yucca Valley Town Council; U.S. Marine Corps Colonel	1943	
California 15		Eric Swalwell (D)	No; Defeated Pete Stark (D)	Dublin City Council; Alameda County deputy district attorney	1980	
California 21		David Valadao (R)	New seat	California State Assembly	1977	
California 26		Julia Brownley (D)	Yes; Open seat; replaced Elton Gallegly (R)	California State Assembly; Santa Monica–Malibu School Board	1952	
California 29		Tony Cárdenas (D)	New seat	Los Angeles City Council; California State Assembly	1963	
California 35		Gloria Negrete McLeod (D)	No; Defeated Joe Baca (D)	California State Senate; California State Assembly; Chaffey College Board	1941	
California 36		Raul Ruiz (D)	Yes; Defeated Mary Bono (R)	Physician	1971	
California 41		Mark Takano (D)	New seat	Riverside Community College District Board	1960	
California 47		Alan Lowenthal (D)	New seat	California State Senate; California State Assembly; Long Beach City Council	1941	
California 51		Juan Vargas (D)	No; Open seat; replaced Bob Filner (D)	California State Senate; California State Assembly; San Diego City Council	1961	
California 52		Scott Peters (D)	Yes; Defeated Brian Bilbray (R)	President of the San Diego City Council; San Diego County deputy attorney	1958	
Connecticut 5		Elizabeth Esty (D)	No; Open seat; replaced Chris Murphy (D)	Connecticut House of Representatives; Cheshire Town Council	1959	
Florida 3		Ted Yoho (R)	No; Defeated Cliff Stearns (R) in a primary	Veterinarian	1955	
Florida 6		Ron DeSantis (R)	New seat	U.S. Navy Judge Advocate General's Corps	1978	
Florida 9		Alan Grayson (D)	New seat	U.S. House of Representatives (Note: Previously elected to the 111th Congress, serving from 2009 to 2011 in the 8th district.)	1958	
Florida 18		Patrick Murphy (D)	Yes; Defeated Allen West (R)	Construction executive	1983	
Florida 19		Trey Radel (R)	No; Open seat; replaced Connie Mack IV (R)	Radio talk show host	1976	
Florida 22		Lois Frankel (D)	New seat	Mayor of West Palm Beach; Florida House of Representatives	1948	
Florida 26		Joe Garcia (D)	Yes; Defeated David Rivera (R)	U.S. Department of Energy official Chair of the Florida Public Service Commission	1963	
Georgia 9		Doug Collins (R)	New seat	Georgia House of Representatives; U.S. Air Force Reserve Colonel	1966	
Hawaii 2		Tulsi Gabbard (D)	No; Open seat; replaced Mazie Hirono (D)	Honolulu City Council; Hawaii House of Representatives; U.S. Army Reserve Lieutenant Colonel	1981	
Illinois 8		Tammy Duckworth (D)	Yes; Defeated Joe Walsh (R)	Assistant Secretary of Veterans Affairs; Illinois Director of Veterans' Affairs; U.S. Army Lieutenant Colonel	1968	
Illinois 10		Brad Schneider (D)	Yes; Defeated Bob Dold (R)	Businessman	1961	
Illinois 11		Bill Foster (D)	Yes; Defeated Judy Biggert (R)	U.S. House of Representatives (Note: Previously elected to the 110th Congress, serving from 2008 to 2011 in the 14th district.); Physicist	1955	
Illinois 12		William Enyart (D)	No; Open seat; replaced Jerry Costello (R)	Adjutant General of Illinois; U.S. Air Force Major General	1949	
Illinois 13		Rodney Davis (R)	No; Open seat; replaced Tim Johnson (R)	Staffer for U.S. Representative John Shimkus; Staffer for Secretary of State George Ryan	1970	
Illinois 17		Cheri Bustos (D)	Yes; Defeated Bobby Schilling (R)	East Moline City Council; Healthcare executive	1961	
Indiana 2		Jackie Walorski (R)	Yes; Open seat; replaced Joe Donnelly (D)	Indiana House of Representatives	1963	
Indiana 5		Susan Brooks (R)	No; Open seat; replaced Dan Burton (R)	U.S. Attorney for Southern Indiana	1960	
Indiana 6		Luke Messer (R)	No; Open seat; replaced Mike Pence (R)	Indiana House of Representatives	1969	
Kentucky 6		Andy Barr (R)	Yes; Defeated Ben Chandler (D)	Lawyer	1973	
Maryland 6		John Delaney (D)	Yes; Defeated Roscoe Bartlett (R)	Business owner	1963	
Massachusetts 4		Joe Kennedy III (D)	No; Open seat; replaced Barney Frank (D)	Middlesex County assistant district attorney	1980	
Michigan 5		Dan Kildee (D)	No; Open seat; replaced Dale Kildee (D)	Genesee County Treasurer; Genesee County Board of Commissioners	1958	
Michigan 11		Kerry Bentivolio (R)	No; Open seat; replaced Thaddeus McCotter (R)	Educator; Michigan National Guard Sergeant First Class	1951	
Minnesota 8		Rick Nolan (DFL)	Yes; Defeated Chip Cravaack (R)	President of the Minnesota World Trade Center; U.S. House of Representatives (Note: Previously elected to the 94th Congress, serving from 1975 to 1981 in the 6th district.); Minnesota House of Representatives	1943	
Missouri 2		Ann Wagner (R)	No; Open seat; replaced Todd Akin (R)	U.S. Ambassador to Luxembourg; Co-chair of the Republican National Committee; Chair of the Missouri Republican Party	1962	
Montana at-large		Steve Daines (R)	No; Open seat; replaced Denny Rehberg (R)	Businessman	1962	
Nevada 1		Dina Titus (D)	No; Open seat; replaced Shelley Berkley (D)	U.S. House of Representatives (Note: Previously elected to the 111th Congress, serving from 2009 to 2011 in the 3rd district.); Nevada Senate; Political science professor	1950	
Nevada 4		Steven Horsford (D)	New seat	Nevada Senate	1973	
New Hampshire 1		Carol Shea-Porter (D)	Yes; Defeated Frank Guinta (R)	U.S. House of Representatives (Note: Previously elected to the 110th Congress, serving from 2007 to 2011.)	1952	
New Hampshire 2		Annie Kuster (D)	Yes; Defeated Charles Bass (R)	Attorney	1956	
New Mexico 1		Michelle Lujan Grisham (D)	No; Open seat; replaced Martin Heinrich (D)	New Mexico Secretary of Health; New Mexico Secretary of Aging	1959	
New York 6		Grace Meng (D)	No; Open seat; replaced Gary Ackerman (D)	New York State Assembly	1975	
New York 8		Hakeem Jeffries (D)	No; Open seat; replaced Edolphus Towns (D)	New York State Assembly	1970	
New York 18		Sean Patrick Maloney (D)	Yes; Defeated Nan Hayworth (R)	White House Staff Secretary; COO of Klodex	1966	
New York 24		Dan Maffei (D)	Yes; Defeated Ann Marie Buerkle (R)	U.S. House of Representatives (Note: Previously elected to the 111th Congress, serving from 2009 to 2011 in the 25th district.); Congressional staffer	1968	
New York 27		Chris Collins (R)	Yes; Defeated Kathy Hochul (D)	Erie County Executive	1950	
North Carolina 8		Richard Hudson (R)	Yes; Defeated Larry Kissell (D)	Congressional staffer	1971	
North Carolina 9		Robert Pittenger (R)	No; Open seat; replaced Sue Myrick (R)	North Carolina Senate	1948	
North Carolina 11		Mark Meadows (R)	Yes; Open seat; replaced Heath Shuler (D)	Real estate developer	1959	
North Carolina 13		George Holding (R)	Yes; Open seat; replaced Brad Miller (D)	U.S. Attorney for Eastern North Carolina; Assistant U.S. Attorney	1968	
North Dakota at-large		Kevin Cramer (R)	No; Open seat; replaced Rick Berg (R)	North Dakota Public Service Commission; Chair of the North Dakota Republican Party	1961	
Ohio 2		Brad Wenstrup (R)	No; Defeated Jean Schmidt (R) in a primary	Podiatric physician U.S. Army Reserve Colonel	1958	
Ohio 3		Joyce Beatty (D)	New seat	Senior vice president of Ohio State University; Ohio House of Representatives	1950	
Ohio 14		David Joyce (R)	No; Open seat; replaced Steve LaTourette (R)	Geauga County Prosecutor	1957	
Oklahoma 1		Jim Bridenstine (R)	No; Defeated John Sullivan (R) in a primary	U.S. Navy Lieutenant Commander	1975	
Oklahoma 2		Markwayne Mullin (R)	Yes; Open seat; replaced Dan Boren (D)	Plumbing business owner Mixed martial artist	1977	
Pennsylvania 4		Scott Perry (R)	No; Open seat; replaced Todd Platts (R)	Pennsylvania House of Representatives; Pennsylvania National Guard Brigadier General	1962	
Pennsylvania 12		Keith Rothfus (R)	Yes; Defeated Mark Critz (D)	Director of the OFBCI; U.S. Department of Homeland Security official	1962	
Pennsylvania 17		Matt Cartwright (D)	No; Defeated Tim Holden (D) in a primary	Lawyer	1961	
South Carolina 7		Tom Rice (R)	New seat	Horry County Council	1957	
Texas 14		Randy Weber (R)	No; Open seat; replaced Ron Paul (R)	Texas House of Representatives; Pearland City Council	1953	
Texas 16		Beto O'Rourke (D)	No; Defeated Silvestre Reyes (D) in a primary	El Paso City Council	1972	
Texas 20		Joaquin Castro (D)	No; Open seat; replaced Charlie Gonzalez (D)	Texas House of Representatives	1974	
Texas 23		Pete Gallego (D)	Yes; Defeated Quico Canseco (R)	Texas House of Representatives	1961	
Texas 25		Roger Williams (R)	New seat	Secretary of State of Texas; Car dealership owner College baseball coach	1949	
Texas 33		Marc Veasey (D)	New seat	Texas House of Representatives	1971	
Texas 34		Filemon Vela Jr. (D)	New seat	Civil attorney	1963	
Texas 36		Steve Stockman (R)	New seat	U.S. House of Representatives (Note: Previously elected to the 104th Congress, serving from 1995 to 1997 in the 9th district.)	1956	
Utah 2		Chris Stewart (R)	New seat	Business executive U.S. Air Force Major	1960	
Washington 6		Derek Kilmer (D)	No; Open seat; replaced Norm Dicks (D)	Washington State Senate; Washington House of Representatives	1974	
Washington 10		Denny Heck (D)	New seat	Washington House of Representatives	1952	
Wisconsin 2		Mark Pocan (D)	No; Open seat; replaced Tammy Baldwin (D)	Wisconsin State Assembly; Dane County Board of Supervisors	1964	

=== Took office during the 113th Congress ===
District	Image	Representative	Took office	Switched party	Prior background	Birth year	Ref
Illinois 2		Robin Kelly (D)	April 11, 2013	No; Succeeded Jesse Jackson Jr. (D)	Chief of staff for Treasurer Alexi Giannoulias; Illinois House of Representatives	1956	
South Carolina 1		Mark Sanford (R)	May 15, 2013	No; Succeeded Tim Scott (R)	Governor of South Carolina; U.S. House of Representatives (Note: Previously elected to the 104th Congress, serving from 1995 to 2001.); U.S. Air Force Captain	1960	
Missouri 8		Jason Smith (R)	June 4, 2013	No; Succeeded Jo Ann Emerson (R)	Missouri House of Representatives	1980	
Louisiana 5		Vance McAllister (R)	November 16, 2013	No; Succeeded Rodney Alexander (R)	Business owner Louisiana National Guard	1974	
Massachusetts 5		Katherine Clark (D)	December 12, 2013	No; Succeeded Ed Markey (D)	Massachusetts Senate; Massachusetts House of Representatives; Melrose School Board	1963	
Alabama 1		Bradley Byrne (R)	January 8, 2014	No; Succeeded Jo Bonner (R)	Chancellor of the Alabama Community College System; Alabama Senate; Alabama State Board of Education	1955	
Florida 13		David Jolly (R)	March 13, 2014	No; Succeeded Bill Young (R)	Staffer for U.S. Representative Bill Young	1972	
Florida 19		Curt Clawson (R)	June 25, 2014	No; Succeeded Trey Radel (R)	Manufacturing businessman College basketball player	1959	
New Jersey 1		Donald Norcross (D)	November 12, 2014	No; Succeeded Rob Andrews (D)	New Jersey Senate; New Jersey General Assembly	1958	
North Carolina 12		Alma Adams (D)	November 12, 2014	No; Succeeded Mel Watt (D)	North Carolina House of Representatives; Greensboro City Council	1946	
Virginia 7		Dave Brat (R)	November 12, 2014	No; Succeeded Eric Cantor (R)	Professor	1964	

== See also ==
- List of United States representatives in the 113th Congress
- List of United States senators in the 113th Congress

== Notes ==
Preceded by New members of the 112th Congress	New members of the 113th Congress; 2013–2015	Succeeded by New members of the 114th Congress
