= List of United States representatives in the 113th Congress =

This is a complete list of United States representatives during the 113th United States Congress (January 3, 2013 – January 3, 2015) in order of seniority. For the most part, representatives are ranked by the beginning of their terms in office. Representatives whose terms begin the same day are ranked by seniority.

Note: The "*" indicates that the representative/delegate may have served one or more non-consecutive terms while in the House of Representatives of the United States Congress.

== Complete seniority list ==
U.S. House seniority
Rank	Representative	Party	District	Seniority date (Previous service, if any)	Term #	Notes
1	John Dingell	D	MI-12	December 13, 1955	30th term	Dean of the House
2	John Conyers	D	MI-13	January 3, 1965	25th term	Ranking Member: Judiciary
3	Charles Rangel	D	NY-13	January 3, 1971	22nd term	
4	Bill Young	R	FL-13	January 3, 1971	22nd term	Died on October 16, 2013.
5	Don Young	R	AK-AL	March 6, 1973	21st term	
6	George Miller	D	CA-11	January 3, 1975	20th term	Ranking Member: Education and the Workforce
7	Henry Waxman	D	CA-33	January 3, 1975	20th term	Ranking Member: Energy and Commerce
8	Ed Markey	D	MA-05	November 2, 1976	20th term	Ranking Member: Natural Resources; Resigned on July 15, 2013.
9	Nick Rahall	D	WV-03	January 3, 1977	19th term	Ranking Member: Transportation and Infrastructure
10	Jim Sensenbrenner	R	WI-05	January 3, 1979	18th term	
11	Tom Petri	R	WI-06	April 3, 1979	18th term	
12	Ralph Hall	R	TX-04	January 3, 1981	17th term	
13	Hal Rogers	R	KY-05	January 3, 1981	17th term	Chair: Appropriations
14	Chris Smith	R	NJ-04	January 3, 1981	17th term	
15	Frank Wolf	R	VA-10	January 3, 1981	17th term	
16	Steny Hoyer	D	MD-05	May 19, 1981	17th term	Minority Whip
17	Marcy Kaptur	D	OH-09	January 3, 1983	16th term	Most senior woman in the U.S. House of Representatives
18	Sander Levin	D	MI-09	January 3, 1983	16th term	Ranking Member: Ways and Means
19	Joe Barton	R	TX-06	January 3, 1985	15th term	
20	Howard Coble	R	NC-06	January 3, 1985	15th term	
21	Pete Visclosky	D	IN-01	January 3, 1985	15th term	
22	Peter DeFazio	D	OR-04	January 3, 1987	14th term	
23	John Lewis	D	GA-05	January 3, 1987	14th term	
24	Louise Slaughter	D	NY-25	January 3, 1987	14th term	Ranking Member: Rules
25	Lamar Smith	R	TX-21	January 3, 1987	14th term	Chair: Science, Space and Technology
26	Fred Upton	R	MI-06	January 3, 1987	14th term	Chair: Energy and Commerce
27	Nancy Pelosi	D	CA-12	June 2, 1987	14th term	Minority Leader
28	Frank Pallone	D	NJ-06	November 8, 1988	14th term	
29	Jimmy Duncan	R	TN-02	November 8, 1988	14th term	
30	Eliot Engel	D	NY-16	January 3, 1989	13th term	Ranking Member: Foreign Affairs
31	Nita Lowey	D	NY-17	January 3, 1989	13th term	Ranking Member: Appropriations
32	Jim McDermott	D	WA-07	January 3, 1989	13th term	
33	Richard Neal	D	MA-01	January 3, 1989	13th term	
34	Dana Rohrabacher	R	CA-48	January 3, 1989	13th term	
35	Ileana Ros-Lehtinen	R	FL-27	August 29, 1989	13th term	
36	José E. Serrano	D	NY-15	March 20, 1990	13th term	
37	Rob Andrews	D	NJ-01	November 6, 1990	13th term	Resigned on February 6, 2014.
38	David Price	D	NC-04	January 3, 1997; Previous service, 1987 – 1995.	13th term*	
39	John Boehner	R	OH-08	January 3, 1991	12th term	Speaker of the House
40	Dave Camp	R	MI-04	January 3, 1991	12th term	Chair: Ways and Means
41	Rosa DeLauro	D	CT-03	January 3, 1991	12th term	
42	Jim Moran	D	VA-08	January 3, 1991	12th term	
43	Collin Peterson	D	MN-07	January 3, 1991	12th term	Ranking Member: Agriculture
44	Maxine Waters	D	CA-43	January 3, 1991	12th term	Ranking Member: Financial Services
45	Sam Johnson	R	TX-03	May 8, 1991	12th term	
46	Ed Pastor	D	AZ-07	October 3, 1991	12th term	
47	Jerry Nadler	D	NY-10	November 3, 1992	12th term	
48	Jim Cooper	D	TN-05	January 3, 2003; Previous service, 1983 – 1995.	12th term*	
49	Spencer Bachus	R	AL-06	January 3, 1993	11th term	
50	Xavier Becerra	D	CA-34	January 3, 1993	11th term	Democratic Caucus Chairman
51	Sanford Bishop	D	GA-02	January 3, 1993	11th term	
52	Corrine Brown	D	FL-05	January 3, 1993	11th term	
53	Ken Calvert	R	CA-42	January 3, 1993	11th term	
54	Jim Clyburn	D	SC-06	January 3, 1993	11th term	Assistant Minority Leader
55	Anna Eshoo	D	CA-18	January 3, 1993	11th term	
56	Bob Goodlatte	R	VA-06	January 3, 1993	11th term	Chair: Judiciary
57	Gene Green	D	TX-29	January 3, 1993	11th term	
58	Luis Gutiérrez	D	IL-04	January 3, 1993	11th term	
59	Alcee Hastings	D	FL-20	January 3, 1993	11th term	
60	Eddie Bernice Johnson	D	TX-30	January 3, 1993	11th term	Ranking Member: Science, Space and Technology
61	Peter T. King	R	NY-02	January 3, 1993	11th term	
62	Jack Kingston	R	GA-01	January 3, 1993	11th term	
63	Carolyn Maloney	D	NY-12	January 3, 1993	11th term	
64	Buck McKeon	R	CA-25	January 3, 1993	11th term	Chair: Armed Services
65	John Mica	R	FL-07	January 3, 1993	11th term	
66	Lucille Roybal-Allard	D	CA-40	January 3, 1993	11th term	
67	Ed Royce	R	CA-39	January 3, 1993	11th term	Chair: Foreign Affairs
68	Bobby Rush	D	IL-01	January 3, 1993	11th term	
69	Bobby Scott	D	VA-03	January 3, 1993	11th term	
70	Nydia Velázquez	D	NY-07	January 3, 1993	11th term	Ranking Member: Small Business
71	Mel Watt	D	NC-12	January 3, 1993	11th term	Resigned on January 6, 2014.
72	Bennie Thompson	D	MS-02	April 13, 1993	11th term	Ranking Member: Homeland Security
73	Sam Farr	D	CA-20	June 8, 1993	11th term	
74	Frank Lucas	R	OK-03	May 10, 1994	11th term	Chair: Agriculture
75	Lloyd Doggett	D	TX-35	January 3, 1995	10th term	
76	Mike Doyle	D	PA-14	January 3, 1995	10th term	
77	Chaka Fattah	D	PA-02	January 3, 1995	10th term	
78	Rodney Frelinghuysen	R	NJ-11	January 3, 1995	10th term	
79	Doc Hastings	R	WA-04	January 3, 1995	10th term	Chair: Natural Resources
80	Sheila Jackson Lee	D	TX-18	January 3, 1995	10th term	
81	Walter B. Jones Jr.	R	NC-03	January 3, 1995	10th term	
82	Tom Latham	R	IA-03	January 3, 1995	10th term	
83	Frank LoBiondo	R	NJ-02	January 3, 1995	10th term	
84	Zoe Lofgren	D	CA-19	January 3, 1995	10th term	
85	Mac Thornberry	R	TX-13	January 3, 1995	10th term	
86	Ed Whitfield	R	KY-01	January 3, 1995	10th term	
87	Elijah Cummings	D	MD-07	April 16, 1996	10th term	Ranking Member: Oversight and Government Reform
88	Earl Blumenauer	D	OR-03	May 21, 1996	10th term	
89	Jo Ann Emerson	R	MO-08	November 5, 1996	10th term	Resigned on January 22, 2013.
90	Robert Aderholt	R	AL-04	January 3, 1997	9th term	
91	Kevin Brady	R	TX-08	January 3, 1997	9th term	
92	Danny K. Davis	D	IL-07	January 3, 1997	9th term	
93	Diana DeGette	D	CO-01	January 3, 1997	9th term	
94	Kay Granger	R	TX-12	January 3, 1997	9th term	
95	Rubén Hinojosa	D	TX-15	January 3, 1997	9th term	
96	Ron Kind	D	WI-03	January 3, 1997	9th term	
97	Carolyn McCarthy	D	NY-04	January 3, 1997	9th term	
98	Jim McGovern	D	MA-02	January 3, 1997	9th term	
99	Mike McIntyre	D	NC-07	January 3, 1997	9th term	
100	Bill Pascrell	D	NJ-09	January 3, 1997	9th term	
101	Joe Pitts	R	PA-16	January 3, 1997	9th term	
102	Loretta Sanchez	D	CA-46	January 3, 1997	9th term	
103	Pete Sessions	R	TX-32	January 3, 1997	9th term	Chair: Rules
104	Brad Sherman	D	CA-30	January 3, 1997	9th term	
105	John Shimkus	R	IL-15	January 3, 1997	9th term	
106	Adam Smith	D	WA-09	January 3, 1997	9th term	Ranking Member: Armed Services
107	John F. Tierney	D	MA-06	January 3, 1997	9th term	
108	Gregory Meeks	D	NY-05	February 3, 1998	9th term	
109	Lois Capps	D	CA-24	March 10, 1998	9th term	
110	Barbara Lee	D	CA-13	April 7, 1998	9th term	
111	Bob Brady	D	PA-01	May 19, 1998	9th term	Ranking Member: House Administration
112	Steve Chabot	R	OH-01	January 3, 2011; Previous service, 1995 – 2009.	9th term*	
113	Mike Capuano	D	MA-07	January 3, 1999	8th term	
114	Joe Crowley	D	NY-14	January 3, 1999	8th term	
115	Rush Holt Jr.	D	NJ-12	January 3, 1999	8th term	
116	John B. Larson	D	CT-01	January 3, 1999	8th term	
117	Gary Miller	R	CA-31	January 3, 1999	8th term	
118	Grace Napolitano	D	CA-32	January 3, 1999	8th term	
119	Paul Ryan	R	WI-01	January 3, 1999	8th term	Chair: Budget
120	Jan Schakowsky	D	IL-09	January 3, 1999	8th term	
121	Mike Simpson	R	ID-02	January 3, 1999	8th term	
122	Lee Terry	R	NE-02	January 3, 1999	8th term	
123	Mike Thompson	D	CA-05	January 3, 1999	8th term	
124	Greg Walden	R	OR-02	January 3, 1999	8th term	
125	Eric Cantor	R	VA-07	January 3, 2001	7th term	Majority Leader; Resigned on August 18, 2014.
126	Shelley Moore Capito	R	WV-02	January 3, 2001	7th term	
127	Lacy Clay	D	MO-01	January 3, 2001	7th term	
128	Ander Crenshaw	R	FL-04	January 3, 2001	7th term	
129	John Culberson	R	TX-07	January 3, 2001	7th term	
130	Susan Davis	D	CA-53	January 3, 2001	7th term	
131	Sam Graves	R	MO-06	January 3, 2001	7th term	Chair: Small Business
132	Mike Honda	D	CA-17	January 3, 2001	7th term	
133	Steve Israel	D	NY-03	January 3, 2001	7th term	
134	Darrell Issa	R	CA-49	January 3, 2001	7th term	Chair: Oversight and Government Reform
135	James Langevin	D	RI-02	January 3, 2001	7th term	
136	Rick Larsen	D	WA-02	January 3, 2001	7th term	
137	Jim Matheson	D	UT-04	January 3, 2001	7th term	
138	Betty McCollum	D	MN-04	January 3, 2001	7th term	
139	Mike Rogers	R	MI-08	January 3, 2001	7th term	Chair: Intelligence
140	Adam Schiff	D	CA-28	January 3, 2001	7th term	
141	Pat Tiberi	R	OH-12	January 3, 2001	7th term	
142	Bill Shuster	R	PA-09	May 15, 2001	7th term	Chair: Transportation and Infrastructure
143	Randy Forbes	R	VA-04	June 19, 2001	7th term	
144	Stephen F. Lynch	D	MA-08	October 16, 2001	7th term	
145	Jeff Miller	R	FL-01	October 16, 2001	7th term	Chair: Veterans' Affairs
146	Joe Wilson	R	SC-02	December 18, 2001	7th term	
147	Rodney Alexander	R	LA-05	January 3, 2003	6th term	Resigned on September 26, 2013.
148	Rob Bishop	R	UT-01	January 3, 2003	6th term	
149	Tim Bishop	D	NY-01	January 3, 2003	6th term	
150	Marsha Blackburn	R	TN-07	January 3, 2003	6th term	
151	Jo Bonner	R	AL-01	January 3, 2003	6th term	Chair: Ethics; Resigned on August 2, 2013.
152	Michael C. Burgess	R	TX-26	January 3, 2003	6th term	
153	John Carter	R	TX-31	January 3, 2003	6th term	
154	Tom Cole	R	OK-04	January 3, 2003	6th term	
155	Mario Díaz-Balart	R	FL-25	January 3, 2003	6th term	
156	Trent Franks	R	AZ-08	January 3, 2003	6th term	
157	Scott Garrett	R	NJ-05	January 3, 2003	6th term	
158	Jim Gerlach	R	PA-06	January 3, 2003	6th term	
159	Phil Gingrey	R	GA-11	January 3, 2003	6th term	
160	Raúl Grijalva	D	AZ-03	January 3, 2003	6th term	
161	Jeb Hensarling	R	TX-05	January 3, 2003	6th term	Chair: Financial Services
162	Steve King	R	IA-04	January 3, 2003	6th term	
163	John Kline	R	MN-02	January 3, 2003	6th term	Chair: Education and the Workforce
164	Mike Michaud	D	ME-02	January 3, 2003	6th term	Ranking Member: Veterans' Affairs
165	Candice Miller	R	MI-10	January 3, 2003	6th term	Chair: House Administration
166	Tim Murphy	R	PA-18	January 3, 2003	6th term	
167	Devin Nunes	R	CA-22	January 3, 2003	6th term	
168	Mike Rogers	R	AL-03	January 3, 2003	6th term	
169	Dutch Ruppersberger	D	MD-02	January 3, 2003	6th term	Ranking Member: Intelligence
170	Tim Ryan	D	OH-13	January 3, 2003	6th term	
171	Linda Sánchez	D	CA-38	January 3, 2003	6th term	Ranking Member: Ethics
172	David Scott	D	GA-13	January 3, 2003	6th term	
173	Mike Turner	R	OH-10	January 3, 2003	6th term	
174	Chris Van Hollen	D	MD-08	January 3, 2003	6th term	Ranking Member: Budget
175	Randy Neugebauer	R	TX-19	June 3, 2003	6th term	
176	G. K. Butterfield	D	NC-01	July 20, 2004	6th term	
177	John Barrow	D	GA-12	January 3, 2005	5th term	
178	Charles Boustany	R	LA-03	January 3, 2005	5th term	
179	Emanuel Cleaver	D	MO-05	January 3, 2005	5th term	
180	Mike Conaway	R	TX-11	January 3, 2005	5th term	
181	Jim Costa	D	CA-16	January 3, 2005	5th term	
182	Henry Cuellar	D	TX-28	January 3, 2005	5th term	
183	Charlie Dent	R	PA-15	January 3, 2005	5th term	
184	Jeff Fortenberry	R	NE-01	January 3, 2005	5th term	
185	Virginia Foxx	R	NC-05	January 3, 2005	5th term	
186	Louie Gohmert	R	TX-01	January 3, 2005	5th term	
187	Al Green	D	TX-09	January 3, 2005	5th term	
188	Brian Higgins	D	NY-26	January 3, 2005	5th term	
189	Dan Lipinski	D	IL-03	January 3, 2005	5th term	
190	Kenny Marchant	R	TX-24	January 3, 2005	5th term	
191	Michael McCaul	R	TX-10	January 3, 2005	5th term	Chair: Homeland Security
192	Patrick McHenry	R	NC-10	January 3, 2005	5th term	
193	Cathy McMorris Rodgers	R	WA-05	January 3, 2005	5th term	Republican Conference Chairwoman
194	Gwen Moore	D	WI-04	January 3, 2005	5th term	
195	Ted Poe	R	TX-02	January 3, 2005	5th term	
196	Tom Price	R	GA-06	January 3, 2005	5th term	
197	Dave Reichert	R	WA-08	January 3, 2005	5th term	
198	Allyson Schwartz	D	PA-13	January 3, 2005	5th term	
199	Debbie Wasserman Schultz	D	FL-23	January 3, 2005	5th term	
200	Lynn Westmoreland	R	GA-03	January 3, 2005	5th term	
201	Doris Matsui	D	CA-06	March 8, 2005	5th term	
202	John Campbell	R	CA-45	December 6, 2005	5th term	
203	Albio Sires	D	NJ-08	November 13, 2006	5th term	
204	Steve Pearce	R	NM-02	January 3, 2011; Previous service, 2003 – 2009.	4th term*	
205	Michele Bachmann	R	MN-06	January 3, 2007	4th term	
206	Gus Bilirakis	R	FL-12	January 3, 2007	4th term	
207	Bruce Braley	D	IA-01	January 3, 2007	4th term	
208	Vern Buchanan	R	FL-16	January 3, 2007	4th term	
209	Kathy Castor	D	FL-14	January 3, 2007	4th term	
210	Yvette Clarke	D	NY-09	January 3, 2007	4th term	
211	Steve Cohen	D	TN-09	January 3, 2007	4th term	
212	Joe Courtney	D	CT-02	January 3, 2007	4th term	
213	Keith Ellison	D	MN-05	January 3, 2007	4th term	
214	Hank Johnson	D	GA-04	January 3, 2007	4th term	
215	Jim Jordan	R	OH-04	January 3, 2007	4th term	
216	Doug Lamborn	R	CO-05	January 3, 2007	4th term	
217	Dave Loebsack	D	IA-02	January 3, 2007	4th term	
218	Kevin McCarthy	R	CA-23	January 3, 2007	4th term	Majority Whip
219	Jerry McNerney	D	CA-09	January 3, 2007	4th term	
220	Ed Perlmutter	D	CO-07	January 3, 2007	4th term	
221	Peter Roskam	R	IL-06	January 3, 2007	4th term	
222	John Sarbanes	D	MD-03	January 3, 2007	4th term	
223	Adrian Smith	R	NE-03	January 3, 2007	4th term	
224	Tim Walz	D	MN-01	January 3, 2007	4th term	
225	Peter Welch	D	VT-AL	January 3, 2007	4th term	
226	John Yarmuth	D	KY-03	January 3, 2007	4th term	
227	Paul Broun	R	GA-10	July 17, 2007	4th term	
228	Niki Tsongas	D	MA-03	October 16, 2007	4th term	
229	Bob Latta	R	OH-05	December 11, 2007	4th term	
230	Rob Wittman	R	VA-01	December 11, 2007	4th term	
231	André Carson	D	IN-07	March 11, 2008	4th term	
232	Jackie Speier	D	CA-14	April 8, 2008	4th term	
233	Steve Scalise	R	LA-01	May 3, 2008	4th term	
234	Donna Edwards	D	MD-04	June 17, 2008	4th term	
235	Marcia Fudge	D	OH-11	November 18, 2008	4th term	
236	Rick Nolan	D	MN-08	January 3, 2013; Previous service, 1975 – 1981.	4th term*	
237	Matt Salmon	R	AZ-05	January 3, 2013; Previous service, 1995 – 2001.	4th term*	
238	Bill Cassidy	R	LA-06	January 3, 2009	3rd term	
239	Jason Chaffetz	R	UT-03	January 3, 2009	3rd term	
240	Mike Coffman	R	CO-06	January 3, 2009	3rd term	
241	Gerry Connolly	D	VA-11	January 3, 2009	3rd term	
242	John Fleming	R	LA-04	January 3, 2009	3rd term	
243	Brett Guthrie	R	KY-02	January 3, 2009	3rd term	
244	Gregg Harper	R	MS-03	January 3, 2009	3rd term	
245	Jim Himes	D	CT-04	January 3, 2009	3rd term	
246	Duncan D. Hunter	R	CA-50	January 3, 2009	3rd term	
247	Lynn Jenkins	R	KS-02	January 3, 2009	3rd term	
248	Leonard Lance	R	NJ-07	January 3, 2009	3rd term	
249	Blaine Luetkemeyer	R	MO-03	January 3, 2009	3rd term	
250	Ben Ray Luján	D	NM-03	January 3, 2009	3rd term	
251	Cynthia Lummis	R	WY-AL	January 3, 2009	3rd term	
252	Tom McClintock	R	CA-04	January 3, 2009	3rd term	
253	Pete Olson	R	TX-22	January 3, 2009	3rd term	
254	Erik Paulsen	R	MN-03	January 3, 2009	3rd term	
255	Gary Peters	D	MI-14	January 3, 2009	3rd term	
256	Chellie Pingree	D	ME-01	January 3, 2009	3rd term	
257	Jared Polis	D	CO-02	January 3, 2009	3rd term	
258	Bill Posey	R	FL-08	January 3, 2009	3rd term	
259	Phil Roe	R	TN-01	January 3, 2009	3rd term	
260	Tom Rooney	R	FL-17	January 3, 2009	3rd term	
261	Aaron Schock	R	IL-18	January 3, 2009	3rd term	
262	Kurt Schrader	D	OR-05	January 3, 2009	3rd term	
263	Glenn Thompson	R	PA-05	January 3, 2009	3rd term	
264	Paul Tonko	D	NY-20	January 3, 2009	3rd term	
265	Mike Quigley	D	IL-05	April 7, 2009	3rd term	
266	Judy Chu	D	CA-27	July 14, 2009	3rd term	
267	John Garamendi	D	CA-03	November 3, 2009	3rd term	
268	Bill Owens	D	NY-21	November 3, 2009	3rd term	
269	Ted Deutch	D	FL-21	April 13, 2010	3rd term	
270	Tom Graves	R	GA-14	June 8, 2010	3rd term	
271	Tom Reed	R	NY-23	November 2, 2010	3rd term	
272	Marlin Stutzman	R	IN-03	November 2, 2010	3rd term	
273	Mike Fitzpatrick	R	PA-08	January 3, 2011; Previous service, 2005 – 2007.	3rd term*	
274	Carol Shea-Porter	D	NH-01	January 3, 2013; Previous service, 2007 – 2011.	3rd term*	
275	Tim Walberg	R	MI-07	January 3, 2011; Previous service, 2007 – 2009.	3rd term*	
276	Bill Foster	D	IL-11	January 3, 2013; Previous service, 2008 – 2011.	3rd term*	
277	Justin Amash	R	MI-03	January 3, 2011	2nd term	
278	Lou Barletta	R	PA-11	January 3, 2011	2nd term	
279	Karen Bass	D	CA-37	January 3, 2011	2nd term	
280	Dan Benishek	R	MI-01	January 3, 2011	2nd term	
281	Diane Black	R	TN-06	January 3, 2011	2nd term	
282	Mo Brooks	R	AL-05	January 3, 2011	2nd term	
283	Larry Bucshon	R	IN-08	January 3, 2011	2nd term	
284	John Carney	D	DE-AL	January 3, 2011	2nd term	
285	David Cicilline	D	RI-01	January 3, 2011	2nd term	
286	Rick Crawford	R	AR-01	January 3, 2011	2nd term	
287	Jeff Denham	R	CA-10	January 3, 2011	2nd term	
288	Scott DesJarlais	R	TN-04	January 3, 2011	2nd term	
289	Sean Duffy	R	WI-07	January 3, 2011	2nd term	
290	Jeff Duncan	R	SC-03	January 3, 2011	2nd term	
291	Renee Ellmers	R	NC-02	January 3, 2011	2nd term	
292	Blake Farenthold	R	TX-27	January 3, 2011	2nd term	
293	Stephen Fincher	R	TN-08	January 3, 2011	2nd term	
294	Chuck Fleischmann	R	TN-03	January 3, 2011	2nd term	
295	Bill Flores	R	TX-17	January 3, 2011	2nd term	
296	Cory Gardner	R	CO-04	January 3, 2011	2nd term	
297	Bob Gibbs	R	OH-07	January 3, 2011	2nd term	
298	Chris Gibson	R	NY-19	January 3, 2011	2nd term	
299	Paul Gosar	R	AZ-04	January 3, 2011	2nd term	
300	Trey Gowdy	R	SC-04	January 3, 2011	2nd term	
301	Tim Griffin	R	AR-02	January 3, 2011	2nd term	
302	Morgan Griffith	R	VA-09	January 3, 2011	2nd term	
303	Michael Grimm	R	NY-11	January 3, 2011	2nd term	
304	Colleen Hanabusa	D	HI-01	January 3, 2011	2nd term	
305	Richard L. Hanna	R	NY-22	January 3, 2011	2nd term	
306	Andy Harris	R	MD-01	January 3, 2011	2nd term	
307	Vicky Hartzler	R	MO-04	January 3, 2011	2nd term	
308	Joe Heck	R	NV-03	January 3, 2011	2nd term	
309	Jaime Herrera Beutler	R	WA-03	January 3, 2011	2nd term	
310	Tim Huelskamp	R	KS-01	January 3, 2011	2nd term	
311	Bill Huizenga	R	MI-02	January 3, 2011	2nd term	
312	Randy Hultgren	R	IL-14	January 3, 2011	2nd term	
313	Robert Hurt	R	VA-05	January 3, 2011	2nd term	
314	Bill Johnson	R	OH-06	January 3, 2011	2nd term	
315	Bill Keating	D	MA-09	January 3, 2011	2nd term	
316	Mike Kelly	R	PA-03	January 3, 2011	2nd term	
317	Adam Kinzinger	R	IL-16	January 3, 2011	2nd term	
318	Raúl Labrador	R	ID-01	January 3, 2011	2nd term	
319	James Lankford	R	OK-05	January 3, 2011	2nd term	
320	Billy Long	R	MO-07	January 3, 2011	2nd term	
321	Tom Marino	R	PA-10	January 3, 2011	2nd term	
322	David McKinley	R	WV-01	January 3, 2011	2nd term	
323	Pat Meehan	R	PA-07	January 3, 2011	2nd term	
324	Mick Mulvaney	R	SC-05	January 3, 2011	2nd term	
325	Kristi Noem	R	SD-AL	January 3, 2011	2nd term	
326	Rich Nugent	R	FL-11	January 3, 2011	2nd term	
327	Alan Nunnelee	R	MS-01	January 3, 2011	2nd term	
328	Steven Palazzo	R	MS-04	January 3, 2011	2nd term	
329	Mike Pompeo	R	KS-04	January 3, 2011	2nd term	
330	Jim Renacci	R	OH-16	January 3, 2011	2nd term	
331	Reid Ribble	R	WI-08	January 3, 2011	2nd term	
332	Cedric Richmond	D	LA-02	January 3, 2011	2nd term	
333	Scott Rigell	R	VA-02	January 3, 2011	2nd term	
334	Martha Roby	R	AL-02	January 3, 2011	2nd term	
335	Todd Rokita	R	IN-04	January 3, 2011	2nd term	
336	Dennis Ross	R	FL-15	January 3, 2011	2nd term	
337	Jon Runyan Sr.	R	NJ-03	January 3, 2011	2nd term	
338	David Schweikert	R	AZ-06	January 3, 2011	2nd term	
339	Austin Scott	R	GA-08	January 3, 2011	2nd term	
340	Terri Sewell	D	AL-07	January 3, 2011	2nd term	
341	Steve Southerland	R	FL-02	January 3, 2011	2nd term	
342	Steve Stivers	R	OH-15	January 3, 2011	2nd term	
343	Scott Tipton	R	CO-03	January 3, 2011	2nd term	
344	Daniel Webster	R	FL-10	January 3, 2011	2nd term	
345	Frederica Wilson	D	FL-24	January 3, 2011	2nd term	
346	Steve Womack	R	AR-03	January 3, 2011	2nd term	
347	Rob Woodall	R	GA-07	January 3, 2011	2nd term	
348	Kevin Yoder	R	KS-03	January 3, 2011	2nd term	
349	Todd Young	R	IN-09	January 3, 2011	2nd term	
350	Janice Hahn	D	CA-44	July 12, 2011	2nd term	
351	Mark Amodei	R	NV-02	September 13, 2011	2nd term	
352	Suzanne Bonamici	D	OR-01	January 31, 2012	2nd term	
353	Ron Barber	D	AZ-02	June 12, 2012	2nd term	
354	Suzan DelBene	D	WA-01	November 6, 2012	2nd term	
355	Thomas Massie	R	KY-04	November 6, 2012	2nd term	
356	Donald Payne Jr.	D	NJ-10	November 6, 2012	2nd term	
357	Steve Stockman	R	TX-36	January 3, 2013; Previous service, 1995 – 1997.	2nd term*	
358	Alan Grayson	D	FL-09	January 3, 2013; Previous service, 2009 – 2011.	2nd term*	
359	Ann Kirkpatrick	D	AZ-01	January 3, 2013; Previous service, 2009 – 2011.	2nd term*	
360	Dan Maffei	D	NY-24	January 3, 2013; Previous service, 2009 – 2011.	2nd term*	
361	Dina Titus	D	NV-01	January 3, 2013; Previous service, 2009 – 2011.	2nd term*	
362	Andy Barr	R	KY-06	January 3, 2013	1st term	
363	Joyce Beatty	D	OH-03	January 3, 2013	1st term	
364	Kerry Bentivolio	R	MI-11	January 3, 2013	1st term	
365	Ami Bera	D	CA-07	January 3, 2013	1st term	
366	Jim Bridenstine	R	OK-01	January 3, 2013	1st term	
367	Susan Brooks	R	IN-05	January 3, 2013	1st term	
368	Julia Brownley	D	CA-26	January 3, 2013	1st term	
369	Cheri Bustos	D	IL-17	January 3, 2013	1st term	
370	Tony Cárdenas	D	CA-29	January 3, 2013	1st term	
371	Matt Cartwright	D	PA-17	January 3, 2013	1st term	
372	Joaquin Castro	D	TX-20	January 3, 2013	1st term	
373	Chris Collins	R	NY-27	January 3, 2013	1st term	
374	Doug Collins	R	GA-09	January 3, 2013	1st term	
375	Paul Cook	R	CA-08	January 3, 2013	1st term	
376	Tom Cotton	R	AR-04	January 3, 2013	1st term	
377	Kevin Cramer	R	ND-AL	January 3, 2013	1st term	
378	Steve Daines	R	MT-AL	January 3, 2013	1st term	
379	Rodney Davis	R	IL-13	January 3, 2013	1st term	
380	John Delaney	D	MD-06	January 3, 2013	1st term	
381	Ron DeSantis	R	FL-06	January 3, 2013	1st term	
382	Tammy Duckworth	D	IL-08	January 3, 2013	1st term	
383	William Enyart	D	IL-12	January 3, 2013	1st term	
384	Elizabeth Esty	D	CT-05	January 3, 2013	1st term	
385	Lois Frankel	D	FL-22	January 3, 2013	1st term	
386	Tulsi Gabbard	D	HI-02	January 3, 2013	1st term	
387	Pete Gallego	D	TX-23	January 3, 2013	1st term	
388	Joe Garcia	D	FL-26	January 3, 2013	1st term	
389	Denny Heck	D	WA-10	January 3, 2013	1st term	
390	George Holding	R	NC-13	January 3, 2013	1st term	
391	Steven Horsford	D	NV-04	January 3, 2013	1st term	
392	Richard Hudson	R	NC-08	January 3, 2013	1st term	
393	Jared Huffman	D	CA-02	January 3, 2013	1st term	
394	Hakeem Jeffries	D	NY-08	January 3, 2013	1st term	
395	David Joyce	R	OH-14	January 3, 2013	1st term	
396	Joe Kennedy III	D	MA-04	January 3, 2013	1st term	
397	Dan Kildee	D	MI-05	January 3, 2013	1st term	
398	Derek Kilmer	D	WA-06	January 3, 2013	1st term	
399	Annie Kuster	D	NH-02	January 3, 2013	1st term	
400	Doug LaMalfa	R	CA-01	January 3, 2013	1st term	
401	Alan Lowenthal	D	CA-47	January 3, 2013	1st term	
402	Michelle Lujan Grisham	D	NM-01	January 3, 2013	1st term	
403	Sean Patrick Maloney	D	NY-18	January 3, 2013	1st term	
404	Gloria Negrete McLeod	D	CA-35	January 3, 2013	1st term	
405	Mark Meadows	R	NC-11	January 3, 2013	1st term	
406	Grace Meng	D	NY-06	January 3, 2013	1st term	
407	Luke Messer	R	IN-06	January 3, 2013	1st term	
408	Markwayne Mullin	R	OK-02	January 3, 2013	1st term	
409	Patrick Murphy	D	FL-18	January 3, 2013	1st term	
410	Beto O'Rourke	D	TX-16	January 3, 2013	1st term	
411	Scott Perry	R	PA-04	January 3, 2013	1st term	
412	Scott Peters	D	CA-52	January 3, 2013	1st term	
413	Robert Pittenger	R	NC-09	January 3, 2013	1st term	
414	Mark Pocan	D	WI-02	January 3, 2013	1st term	
415	Trey Radel	R	FL-19	January 3, 2013	1st term	Resigned on January 27, 2014.
416	Tom Rice	R	SC-07	January 3, 2013	1st term	
417	Keith Rothfus	R	PA-12	January 3, 2013	1st term	
418	Raul Ruiz	D	CA-36	January 3, 2013	1st term	
419	Brad Schneider	D	IL-10	January 3, 2013	1st term	
420	Kyrsten Sinema	D	AZ-09	January 3, 2013	1st term	
421	Chris Stewart	R	UT-02	January 3, 2013	1st term	
422	Eric Swalwell	D	CA-15	January 3, 2013	1st term	
423	Mark Takano	D	CA-41	January 3, 2013	1st term	
424	David Valadao	R	CA-21	January 3, 2013	1st term	
425	Juan Vargas	D	CA-51	January 3, 2013	1st term	
426	Marc Veasey	D	TX-33	January 3, 2013	1st term	
427	Filemon Vela Jr.	D	TX-34	January 3, 2013	1st term	
428	Ann Wagner	R	MO-02	January 3, 2013	1st term	
429	Jackie Walorski	R	IN-02	January 3, 2013	1st term	
430	Randy Weber	R	TX-14	January 3, 2013	1st term	
431	Brad Wenstrup	R	OH-02	January 3, 2013	1st term	
432	Roger Williams	R	TX-25	January 3, 2013	1st term	
433	Ted Yoho	R	FL-03	January 3, 2013	1st term	
	Robin Kelly	D	IL-02	April 9, 2013	1st term	
	Mark Sanford	R	SC-01	May 7, 2013; Previous service, 1995 – 2001.	4th term*	
	Jason Smith	R	MO-08	June 4, 2013	1st term	
	Vance McAllister	R	LA-05	November 16, 2013	1st term	
	Katherine Clark	D	MA-05	December 10, 2013	1st term	
	Bradley Byrne	R	AL-01	December 17, 2013	1st term	
	David Jolly	R	FL-13	March 11, 2014	1st term	
	Curt Clawson	R	FL-19	June 24, 2014	1st term	
	Alma Adams	D	NC-12	November 4, 2014	1st term	
	Dave Brat	R	VA-07	November 4, 2014	1st term	
	Donald Norcross	D	NJ-01	November 4, 2014	1st term	

== Delegates ==
Rank	Delegate	Party	District	Seniority date (Previous service, if any)	Term #	Notes
1	Eni Faleomavaega	D	AS	January 3, 1989	13th term	
2	Eleanor Holmes Norton	D	DC	January 3, 1991	12th term	
3	Donna Christian-Christensen	D	VI	January 3, 1997	9th term	
4	Madeleine Bordallo	D	GU	January 3, 2003	6th term	
5	Pedro Pierluisi	D	PR	January 3, 2009	3rd term	
6	Gregorio Sablan	D	NMI	January 3, 2009	3rd term	

== See also ==
- 113th United States Congress
- List of United States congressional districts
- List of United States senators in the 113th Congress
