= List of United States senators in the 113th Congress =

This is a complete list of United States senators during the 113th United States Congress listed by seniority from January 3, 2013, to January 3, 2015. It is a historical listing and will contain people who have not served the entire two-year Congress should anyone resign, die, or be expelled.

Order of service is based on the commencement of the senator's first term. Behind this is former service as a senator (only giving the senator seniority within their new incoming class), service as vice president, a House member, a cabinet secretary, or a governor of a state. The final factor is the population of the senator's state.

Senators who were sworn in during the middle of the two-year Congress (up until the last senator who was not sworn in early after winning the November 2014 election) are listed at the end of the list with no number.

In this Congress, Tom Harkin (D-Iowa) was the most senior junior senator. Brian Schatz (Hawaii) was the most junior senior senator until February 1, 2013, when John Kerry's resignation to become Secretary of State made freshwoman Elizabeth Warren (D-Massachusetts) the most junior senior Senator.

The 113th Congress was the first Congress since the 103rd Congress (1993–95) without a senator who had served for at least 40 years. The most senior senator, Patrick Leahy, did not reach the 40-year mark until January 3, 2015. From November 7, 1996, when Strom Thurmond reached the 40-year mark during the 104th Congress, until Daniel Inouye died on December 17, 2012, there was always at least one senator who had served for 40 years.

In the 113th Congress, 17 states (Nevada, Alaska, New Hampshire, Maine, Florida, North Carolina, North Dakota, South Dakota, Wisconsin, Iowa, Illinois, Indiana, Ohio, Pennsylvania, Missouri, Arkansas, Louisiana) had split delegations (1 senator caucusing with Democrats & 1 caucusing with Republicans). Maine had a Republican up for re-election in 2014 & a Democrat up in 2018. Nevada had a Democrat up in 2016 & a Republican up in 2018. All 15 other states with split delegations had a Republican up in 2016 and a Democrat up in either 2014 or 2018. This is a stark difference from the 118th Congress, which has only 5 split Senate delegations.

== Terms of service ==
Class	Terms of service of senators that expired in years
Class 2	Terms of service of senators that expired in 2015 (AK, AL, AR, CO, DE, GA, IA, ID, IL, KS, KY, LA, MA, ME, MI, MN, MS, MT, NC, NE, NH, NJ, NM, OK, OR, RI, SC, SD, TN, TX, VA, WV, and WY.)
Class 3	Terms of service of senators that expired in 2017 (AK, AL, AR, AZ, CA, CO, CT, FL, GA, HI, IA, ID, IL, IN, KS, KY, LA, MD, MO, NC, ND, NH, NV, NY, OH, OK, OR, PA, SC, SD, UT, VT, WA, and WI.)
Class 1	Terms of service of senators that expired in 2019 (AZ, CA, CT, DE, FL, HI, IN, MA, MD, ME, MI, MN, MO, MS, MT, ND, NE, NJ, NM, NV, NY, OH, PA, RI, TN, TX, UT, VA, VT, WA, WI, WV, and WY.)

== U.S. Senate seniority list ==
Rank	Historical rank	Senator	Party	State	Seniority date	Other factors
1	1692	Patrick Leahy	Democratic	Vermont	January 3, 1975	
2	1708	Orrin Hatch	Republican	Utah	January 3, 1977	
3	1717	Max Baucus	Democratic	Montana	December 15, 1978	
4	1719	Thad Cochran	Republican	Mississippi	December 27, 1978	
5	1730	Carl Levin	Democratic	Michigan	January 3, 1979	
6	1743	Chuck Grassley	Republican	Iowa	January 3, 1981	
7	1761	John Kerry	Democratic	Massachusetts	January 2, 1985	
8	1763	Tom Harkin	Democratic	Iowa	January 3, 1985	Former member of the U.S. House of Representatives
9	1766	Mitch McConnell	Republican	Kentucky	January 3, 1985	
10	1767	Jay Rockefeller	Democratic	West Virginia	January 15, 1985	
11	1773	Barbara Mikulski	Democratic	Maryland	January 3, 1987	Former member of the U.S. House of Representatives (10 years)
12	1775	Richard Shelby	Republican	Alabama	January 3, 1987	Former member of the U.S. House of Representatives (8 years)
13	1777	John McCain	Republican	Arizona	January 3, 1987	Former member of the U.S. House of Representatives (4 years); Arizona 29th in population (1980)
14	1778	Harry Reid	Democratic	Nevada	January 3, 1987	Former member of the U.S. House of Representatives (4 years); Nevada 43rd in population (1980)
15	1801	Dianne Feinstein	Democratic	California	November 10, 1992	
16	1804	Barbara Boxer	Democratic	California	January 3, 1993	Former member of the U.S. House of Representatives
17	1812	Patty Murray	Democratic	Washington	January 3, 1993	
18	1816	Jim Inhofe	Republican	Oklahoma	November 17, 1994	
19	1827	Ron Wyden	Democratic	Oregon	February 6, 1996	
20	1830	Pat Roberts	Republican	Kansas	January 3, 1997	Former member of the U.S. House of Representatives (16 years)
21	1831	Dick Durbin	Democratic	Illinois	January 3, 1997	Former member of the U.S. House of Representatives (14 years)
22	1833	Tim Johnson	Democratic	South Dakota	January 3, 1997	Former member of the U.S. House of Representatives (10 years)
23	1835	Jack Reed	Democratic	Rhode Island	January 3, 1997	Former member of the U.S. House of Representatives (6 years)
24	1838	Mary Landrieu	Democratic	Louisiana	January 3, 1997	Louisiana 21st in population (1990)
25	1839	Jeff Sessions	Republican	Alabama	January 3, 1997	Alabama 22nd in population (1990)
26	1842	Susan Collins	Republican	Maine	January 3, 1997	Maine 38th in population (1990)
27	1843	Mike Enzi	Republican	Wyoming	January 3, 1997	Wyoming 50th in population (1990)
28	1844	Chuck Schumer	Democratic	New York	January 3, 1999	Former member of the U.S. House of Representatives (18 years)
29	1846	Mike Crapo	Republican	Idaho	January 3, 1999	Former member of the U.S. House of Representatives (6 years)
30	1854	Bill Nelson	Democratic	Florida	January 3, 2001	Former member of the U.S. House of Representatives (12 years)
31	1855	Tom Carper	Democratic	Delaware	January 3, 2001	Former member of the U.S. House of Representatives (10 years)
32	1856	Debbie Stabenow	Democratic	Michigan	January 3, 2001	Former member of the U.S. House of Representatives (4 years)
33	1859	Maria Cantwell	Democratic	Washington	January 3, 2001	Former member of the U.S. House of Representatives (2 years)
34	1867	John Cornyn	Republican	Texas	December 2, 2002	
35	1868	Lisa Murkowski	Republican	Alaska	December 20, 2002	
36	1755	Frank Lautenberg (Note: Died in office on June 3, 2013. Jeffrey Chiesa appointed replacement June 6, 2013)	Democratic	New Jersey	January 3, 2003	Previously a senator
37	1869	Saxby Chambliss	Republican	Georgia	January 3, 2003	Former member of the U.S. House of Representatives (8 years); Georgia 10th in population (2000)
38	1870	Lindsey Graham	Republican	South Carolina	January 3, 2003	Former member of the U.S. House of Representatives (8 years); South Carolina 26th in population (2000)
39	1872	Lamar Alexander	Republican	Tennessee	January 3, 2003	Former cabinet member
40	1875	Mark Pryor	Democratic	Arkansas	January 3, 2003	
41	1876	Richard Burr	Republican	North Carolina	January 3, 2005	Former member of the U.S. House of Representatives (10 years)
42	1878	Tom Coburn	Republican	Oklahoma	January 3, 2005	Former member of the U.S. House of Representatives (6 years); Oklahoma 27th in population (2000)
43	1879	John Thune	Republican	South Dakota	January 3, 2005	Former member of the U.S. House of Representatives (6 years); South Dakota 46th in population (2000)
44	1880	Johnny Isakson	Republican	Georgia	January 3, 2005	Former member of the U.S. House of Representatives (5 years, 10 months)
45	1881	David Vitter	Republican	Louisiana	January 3, 2005	Former member of the U.S. House of Representatives (5 years, 7 months)
46	1885	Bob Menendez	Democratic	New Jersey	January 17, 2006	
47	1886	Ben Cardin	Democratic	Maryland	January 3, 2007	Former member of the U.S. House of Representatives (20 years)
48	1887	Bernie Sanders	Independent	Vermont	January 3, 2007	Former member of the U.S. House of Representatives (16 years)
49	1888	Sherrod Brown	Democratic	Ohio	January 3, 2007	Former member of the U.S. House of Representatives (14 years)
50	1889	Bob Casey Jr.	Democratic	Pennsylvania	January 3, 2007	Pennsylvania 6th in population (2000)
51	1891	Bob Corker	Republican	Tennessee	January 3, 2007	Tennessee 16th in population (2000)
52	1892	Claire McCaskill	Democratic	Missouri	January 3, 2007	Missouri 17th in population (2000)
53	1893	Amy Klobuchar	Democratic	Minnesota	January 3, 2007	Minnesota 21st in population (2000)
54	1894	Sheldon Whitehouse	Democratic	Rhode Island	January 3, 2007	Rhode Island 43rd in population (2000)
55	1895	Jon Tester	Democratic	Montana	January 3, 2007	Montana 44th in population (2000)
56	1896	John Barrasso	Republican	Wyoming	June 25, 2007	
57	1897	Roger Wicker	Republican	Mississippi	December 31, 2007	
58	1898	Mark Udall	Democratic	Colorado	January 3, 2009	Former member of the U.S. House of Representatives (10 years); Colorado 24th in population (2000)
59	1899	Tom Udall	Democratic	New Mexico	January 3, 2009	Former member of the U.S. House of Representatives (10 years); New Mexico 36th in population (2000)
60	1900	Mike Johanns	Republican	Nebraska	January 3, 2009	Former cabinet member
61	1901	Jeanne Shaheen	Democratic	New Hampshire	January 3, 2009	Former governor (6 years)
62	1902	Mark Warner	Democratic	Virginia	January 3, 2009	Former governor (4 years)
63	1903	Jim Risch	Republican	Idaho	January 3, 2009	Former governor (7 months)
64	1904	Kay Hagan	Democratic	North Carolina	January 3, 2009	North Carolina 11th in population (2000)
65	1905	Jeff Merkley	Democratic	Oregon	January 3, 2009	Oregon 28th in population (2000)
66	1906	Mark Begich	Democratic	Alaska	January 3, 2009	Alaska 48th in population (2000)
67	1909	Michael Bennet	Democratic	Colorado	January 21, 2009	
68	1910	Kirsten Gillibrand	Democratic	New York	January 26, 2009	
69	1911	Al Franken	Democratic	Minnesota	July 7, 2009	
70	1916	Joe Manchin	Democratic	West Virginia	November 15, 2010	Former governor
71	1917	Chris Coons	Democratic	Delaware	November 15, 2010	
72	1918	Mark Kirk	Republican	Illinois	November 29, 2010	
73	1785	Dan Coats	Republican	Indiana	January 3, 2011	Previously a senator
74	1919	Roy Blunt	Republican	Missouri	January 3, 2011	Former member of the U.S. House of Representatives (14 years); Missouri 17th in population (2010)
75	1920	Jerry Moran	Republican	Kansas	January 3, 2011	Former member of the U.S. House of Representatives (14 years); Kansas 32nd in population (2010)
76	1921	Rob Portman	Republican	Ohio	January 3, 2011	Former member of the U.S. House of Representatives (12 years)
77	1922	John Boozman	Republican	Arkansas	January 3, 2011	Former member of the U.S. House of Representatives (9 years)
78	1923	Pat Toomey	Republican	Pennsylvania	January 3, 2011	Former member of the U.S. House of Representatives (6 years)
79	1924	John Hoeven	Republican	North Dakota	January 3, 2011	Former governor
80	1925	Marco Rubio	Republican	Florida	January 3, 2011	Florida 4th in population (2010)
81	1926	Ron Johnson	Republican	Wisconsin	January 3, 2011	Wisconsin 18th in population (2010)
82	1927	Rand Paul	Republican	Kentucky	January 3, 2011	Kentucky 25th in population (2010)
83	1928	Richard Blumenthal	Democratic	Connecticut	January 3, 2011	Connecticut 29th in population (2010)
84	1929	Mike Lee	Republican	Utah	January 3, 2011	Utah 34th in population (2010)
85	1930	Kelly Ayotte	Republican	New Hampshire	January 3, 2011	New Hampshire 41st in population (2010)
86	1931	Dean Heller	Republican	Nevada	May 9, 2011	
87	1932	Brian Schatz	Democratic	Hawaii	December 27, 2012	
88	1933	Tim Scott	Republican	South Carolina	January 2, 2013	
89	1934	Tammy Baldwin	Democratic	Wisconsin	January 3, 2013	Former member of the U.S. House of Representatives (14 years)
90	1935	Jeff Flake	Republican	Arizona	January 3, 2013	Former member of the U.S. House of Representatives (12 years)
91	1936	Joe Donnelly	Democratic	Indiana	January 3, 2013	Former member of the U.S. House of Representatives (6 years); Indiana 16th in population (2010)
92	1937	Chris Murphy	Democratic	Connecticut	January 3, 2013	Former member of the U.S. House of Representatives (6 years); Connecticut 29th in population (2010)
93	1938	Mazie Hirono	Democratic	Hawaii	January 3, 2013	Former member of the U.S. House of Representatives (6 years); Hawaii 42nd in population (2010)
94	1939	Martin Heinrich	Democratic	New Mexico	January 3, 2013	Former member of the U.S. House of Representatives (4 years)
95	1940	Angus King	Independent	Maine	January 3, 2013	Former governor (8 years)
96	1941	Tim Kaine	Democratic	Virginia	January 3, 2013	Former governor (4 years)
97	1942	Ted Cruz	Republican	Texas	January 3, 2013	Texas 2nd in population (2010)
98	1943	Elizabeth Warren	Democratic	Massachusetts	January 3, 2013	Massachusetts 15th in population (2010)
99	1944	Deb Fischer	Republican	Nebraska	January 3, 2013	Nebraska 38th in population (2010)
100	1945	Heidi Heitkamp	Democratic	North Dakota	January 3, 2013	North Dakota 48th in population (2010)
	1946	Mo Cowan	Democratic	Massachusetts	February 1, 2013	
	1947	Jeffrey Chiesa	Republican	New Jersey	June 6, 2013	
	1948	Ed Markey	Democratic	Massachusetts	July 16, 2013	
	1949	Cory Booker	Democratic	New Jersey	October 31, 2013	
	1950	John Walsh	Democratic	Montana	February 9, 2014	

The most senior senators by class were Orrin Hatch (R-Utah) from Class 1, Max Baucus (D-Montana) from Class 2, and Patrick Leahy (D-Vermont) from Class 3. Baucus resigned on February 6, 2014, with Thad Cochran (R-Mississippi) became the senior senator from his class.

== See also ==
- 113th United States Congress
- List of United States representatives in the 113th Congress
