= List of United States senators in the 114th Congress =

This is a complete list of United States senators during the 114th United States Congress listed by seniority from January 3, 2015, to January 3, 2017.

In this Congress, Barbara Boxer (D-California) was the most senior junior senator and Deb Fischer (R-Nebraska) was the most junior senior senator.

Sometimes a senator is sworn in during the middle of the two-year Congress. This did not occur in this Congress.

Order of service is based on the commencement of the senator's first term. Behind this is former service as a senator (only giving the senator seniority within their new incoming class), service as vice president, a House member, a cabinet secretary, or a governor of a state. The final factor is the population of the senator's state.

== Terms of service ==
Class	Terms of service of senators that expired in years
Class 3	Terms of service of senators that expired in 2017 (Alabama, Alaska, Arizona, Arkansas, California, Colorado, Connecticut, Delaware, Florida, Georgia, Hawaii, Idaho, Illinois, Iowa, Indiana, Kansas, Kentucky, Louisiana, Massachusetts, Maine, Michigan, Minnesota, Mississippi, North Carolina, North Dakota, New Hampshire, New Mexico, Nevada, New York, Oklahoma, Oregon, South Carolina, South Dakota, Tennessee, Utah, Washington and Wisconsin.)
Class 1	Terms of service of senators that expired in 2019 (Arizona, California, Connecticut, Delaware, Florida, Hawaii, Indiana, Maine, Maryland, Massachusetts, Michigan, Minnesota, Mississippi, Missouri, Montana, Nebraska, Nevada, New Jersey, New Mexico, New York, North Dakota, Ohio, Pennsylvania, Rhode Island, Tennessee, Texas, Utah, Vermont, Virginia, Washington, West Virginia, Wisconsin, and Wyoming.)
Class 2	Terms of service of senators that expired in 2021 (Alabama, Alaska, Arkansas, Colorado, Delaware, Georgia, Iowa, Idaho, Illinois, Kansas, Kentucky, Louisiana, Massachusetts, Maine, Michigan, Minnesota, Mississippi, Montana, North Carolina, Nebraska, New Hampshire, New Jersey, New Mexico, Oklahoma, Oregon, Rhode Island, South Carolina, South Dakota, Tennessee, Texas, Virginia, West Virginia, and Wyoming.)

== U.S. Senate seniority list ==
Current rank	Historical rank	Senator	Party	State	Seniority date	Other factors
1	1692	Patrick Leahy	Democratic	Vermont	January 3, 1975	
2	1708	Orrin Hatch	Republican	Utah	January 3, 1977	
3	1719	Thad Cochran	Republican	Mississippi	December 27, 1978	
4	1743	Chuck Grassley	Republican	Iowa	January 3, 1981	
5	1766	Mitch McConnell	Republican	Kentucky	January 3, 1985	
6	1773	Barbara Mikulski	Democratic	Maryland	January 3, 1987	Former member of the U.S. House of Representatives (10 years)
7	1775	Richard Shelby	Republican	Alabama	January 3, 1987	Former member of the U.S. House of Representatives (8 years)
8	1777	John McCain	Republican	Arizona	January 3, 1987	Former member of the U.S. House of Representatives (4 years); Arizona 29th in population (1980)
9	1778	Harry Reid	Democratic	Nevada	January 3, 1987	Former member of the U.S. House of Representatives (4 years); Nevada 43rd in population (1980)
10	1801	Dianne Feinstein	Democratic	California	November 10, 1992	
11	1804	Barbara Boxer	Democratic	California	January 3, 1993	Former member of the U.S. House of Representatives
12	1812	Patty Murray	Democratic	Washington	January 3, 1993	
13	1816	Jim Inhofe	Republican	Oklahoma	November 17, 1994	
14	1827	Ron Wyden	Democratic	Oregon	February 6, 1996	
15	1830	Pat Roberts	Republican	Kansas	January 3, 1997	Former member of the U.S. House of Representatives (16 years)
16	1831	Dick Durbin	Democratic	Illinois	January 3, 1997	Former member of the U.S. House of Representatives (14 years)
17	1835	Jack Reed	Democratic	Rhode Island	January 3, 1997	Former member of the U.S. House of Representatives (6 years)
18	1839	Jeff Sessions	Republican	Alabama	January 3, 1997	Alabama 22nd in population (1990)
19	1842	Susan Collins	Republican	Maine	January 3, 1997	Maine 38th in population (1990)
20	1843	Mike Enzi	Republican	Wyoming	January 3, 1997	Wyoming 50th in population (1990)
21	1844	Chuck Schumer	Democratic	New York	January 3, 1999	Former member of the U.S. House of Representatives (18 years)
22	1846	Mike Crapo	Republican	Idaho	January 3, 1999	Former member of the U.S. House of Representatives (6 years)
23	1854	Bill Nelson	Democratic	Florida	January 3, 2001	Former member of the U.S. House of Representatives (12 years)
24	1855	Tom Carper	Democratic	Delaware	January 3, 2001	Former member of the U.S. House of Representatives (10 years)
25	1856	Debbie Stabenow	Democratic	Michigan	January 3, 2001	Former member of the U.S. House of Representatives (4 years)
26	1859	Maria Cantwell	Democratic	Washington	January 3, 2001	Former member of the U.S. House of Representatives (2 years)
27	1873	John Cornyn	Republican	Texas	December 2, 2002	
28	1867	Lisa Murkowski	Republican	Alaska	December 20, 2002	
29	1869	Lindsey Graham	Republican	South Carolina	January 3, 2003	Former member of the U.S. House of Representatives
30	1871	Lamar Alexander	Republican	Tennessee	January 3, 2003	
31	1876	Richard Burr	Republican	North Carolina	January 3, 2005	Former member of the U.S. House of Representatives (10 years)
32	1879	John Thune	Republican	South Dakota	January 3, 2005	Former member of the U.S. House of Representatives (6 years)
33	1880	Johnny Isakson	Republican	Georgia	January 3, 2005	Former member of the U.S. House of Representatives (5 years, 10 months)
34	1881	David Vitter	Republican	Louisiana	January 3, 2005	Former member of the U.S. House of Representatives (5 years, 7 months)
35	1885	Bob Menendez	Democratic	New Jersey	January 18, 2006	
36	1886	Ben Cardin	Democratic	Maryland	January 3, 2007	Former member of the U.S. House of Representatives (20 years)
37	1887	Bernie Sanders	Independent	Vermont	January 3, 2007	Former member of the U.S. House of Representatives (16 years)
38	1888	Sherrod Brown	Democratic	Ohio	January 3, 2007	Former member of the U.S. House of Representatives (14 years)
39	1889	Bob Casey Jr	Democratic	Pennsylvania	January 3, 2007	Pennsylvania 6th in population (2000)
40	1891	Bob Corker	Republican	Tennessee	January 3, 2007	Tennessee 16th in population (2000)
41	1892	Claire McCaskill	Democratic	Missouri	January 3, 2007	Missouri 17th in population (2000)
42	1893	Amy Klobuchar	Democratic	Minnesota	January 3, 2007	Minnesota 21st in population (2000)
43	1894	Sheldon Whitehouse	Democratic	Rhode Island	January 3, 2007	Rhode Island 43rd in population (2000)
44	1895	Jon Tester	Democratic	Montana	January 3, 2007	Montana 44th in population (2000)
45	1896	John Barrasso	Republican	Wyoming	June 25, 2007	
46	1897	Roger Wicker	Republican	Mississippi	December 31, 2007	
47	1899	Tom Udall	Democratic	New Mexico	January 3, 2009	Former member of the U.S. House of Representatives
48	1901	Jeanne Shaheen	Democratic	New Hampshire	January 3, 2009	Former governor (6 years)
49	1902	Mark Warner	Democratic	Virginia	January 3, 2009	Former governor (4 years)
50	1903	Jim Risch	Republican	Idaho	January 3, 2009	Former governor (7 months)
51	1905	Jeff Merkley	Democratic	Oregon	January 3, 2009	
52	1909	Michael Bennet	Democratic	Colorado	January 21, 2009	
53	1910	Kirsten Gillibrand	Democratic	New York	January 26, 2009	
54	1911	Al Franken	Democratic	Minnesota	July 7, 2009	
55	1916	Joe Manchin	Democratic	West Virginia	November 15, 2010	Former governor
56	1917	Chris Coons	Democratic	Delaware	November 15, 2010	
57	1918	Mark Kirk	Republican	Illinois	November 29, 2010	
58	1785	Dan Coats	Republican	Indiana	January 3, 2011	Previously a senator
59	1919	Roy Blunt	Republican	Missouri	January 3, 2011	Former member of the U.S. House of Representatives (14 years); Missouri 17th in population (2000)
60	1920	Jerry Moran	Republican	Kansas	January 3, 2011	Former member of the U.S. House of Representatives (14 years); Kansas 32nd in population (2000)
61	1921	Rob Portman	Republican	Ohio	January 3, 2011	Former member of the U.S. House of Representatives (12 years)
62	1922	John Boozman	Republican	Arkansas	January 3, 2011	Former member of the U.S. House of Representatives (9 years)
63	1923	Pat Toomey	Republican	Pennsylvania	January 3, 2011	Former member of the U.S. House of Representatives (6 years)
64	1924	John Hoeven	Republican	North Dakota	January 3, 2011	Former governor
65	1925	Marco Rubio	Republican	Florida	January 3, 2011	Florida 4th in population (2000)
66	1926	Ron Johnson	Republican	Wisconsin	January 3, 2011	Wisconsin 18th in population (2000)
67	1927	Rand Paul	Republican	Kentucky	January 3, 2011	Kentucky 25th in population (2000)
68	1928	Richard Blumenthal	Democratic	Connecticut	January 3, 2011	Connecticut 29th in population (2000)
69	1929	Mike Lee	Republican	Utah	January 3, 2011	Utah 34th in population (2000)
70	1930	Kelly Ayotte	Republican	New Hampshire	January 3, 2011	New Hampshire 41st in population (2000)
71	1931	Dean Heller	Republican	Nevada	May 9, 2011	
72	1932	Brian Schatz	Democratic	Hawaii	December 27, 2012	
73	1933	Tim Scott	Republican	South Carolina	January 2, 2013	
74	1934	Tammy Baldwin	Democratic	Wisconsin	January 3, 2013	Former member of the U.S. House of Representatives (14 years)
75	1935	Jeff Flake	Republican	Arizona	January 3, 2013	Former member of the U.S. House of Representatives (12 years)
76	1936	Joe Donnelly	Democratic	Indiana	January 3, 2013	Former member of the U.S. House of Representatives (6 years); Indiana 16th in population (2010)
77	1937	Chris Murphy	Democratic	Connecticut	January 3, 2013	Former member of the U.S. House of Representatives (6 years); Connecticut 29th in population (2010)
78	1938	Mazie Hirono	Democratic	Hawaii	January 3, 2013	Former member of the U.S. House of Representatives (6 years); Hawaii 42nd in population (2010)
79	1939	Martin Heinrich	Democratic	New Mexico	January 3, 2013	Former member of the U.S. House of Representatives (4 years)
80	1940	Angus King	Independent	Maine	January 3, 2013	Former governor (8 years)
81	1941	Tim Kaine	Democratic	Virginia	January 3, 2013	Former governor (4 years)
82	1942	Ted Cruz	Republican	Texas	January 3, 2013	Texas 2nd in population (2010)
83	1943	Elizabeth Warren	Democratic	Massachusetts	January 3, 2013	Massachusetts 15th in population (2010)
84	1944	Deb Fischer	Republican	Nebraska	January 3, 2013	Nebraska 38th in population (2010)
85	1945	Heidi Heitkamp	Democratic	North Dakota	January 3, 2013	North Dakota 48th in population (2010)
86	1948	Ed Markey	Democratic	Massachusetts	July 16, 2013	
87	1949	Cory Booker	Democratic	New Jersey	October 31, 2013	
88	1951	Shelley Moore Capito	Republican	West Virginia	January 3, 2015	Former member of the U.S. House of Representatives (14 years)
89	1952	Gary Peters	Democratic	Michigan	January 3, 2015	Former member of the U.S. House of Representatives (6 years); Michigan 9th in population (2010)
90	1953	Bill Cassidy	Republican	Louisiana	January 3, 2015	Former member of the U.S. House of Representatives (6 years); Louisiana 25th in population (2010)
91	1954	Cory Gardner	Republican	Colorado	January 3, 2015	Former member of the U.S. House of Representatives (4 years); Colorado 22nd in population (2010)
92	1955	James Lankford	Republican	Oklahoma	January 3, 2015	Former member of the U.S. House of Representatives (4 years); Oklahoma 28th in population (2010)
93	1956	Tom Cotton	Republican	Arkansas	January 3, 2015	Former member of the U.S. House of Representatives (2 years); Arkansas 32nd in population (2010)
94	1957	Steve Daines	Republican	Montana	January 3, 2015	Former member of the U.S. House of Representatives (2 years); Montana 44th in population (2010)
95	1958	Mike Rounds	Republican	South Dakota	January 3, 2015	Former governor
96	1959	David Perdue	Republican	Georgia	January 3, 2015	Georgia 8th in population (2010)
97	1960	Thom Tillis	Republican	North Carolina	January 3, 2015	North Carolina 10th in population (2010)
98	1961	Joni Ernst	Republican	Iowa	January 3, 2015	Iowa 30th in population (2010)
99	1962	Ben Sasse	Republican	Nebraska	January 3, 2015	Nebraska 37th in population (2010)
100	1963	Dan Sullivan	Republican	Alaska	January 3, 2015	Alaska 47th in population (2010)

The most senior senators by class were Orrin Hatch (R-Utah) from Class 1, Thad Cochran (R-Mississippi) from Class 2, and Patrick Leahy (D-Vermont) from Class 3.

== See also ==
- 114th United States Congress
- List of United States representatives in the 114th Congress
