= List of United States representatives in the 114th Congress =

This is a complete list of United States representatives during the 114th United States Congress (January 3, 2015 – January 3, 2017) ordered by seniority.

== Non-consecutive terms ==
The "*" indicates that the representative/delegate may have served one or more non-consecutive terms while in the House of Representatives of the United States Congress.

== Complete seniority list ==
Rank	Representative	Party	District	Seniority date (Previous service, if any)	Notes
1	John Conyers	D	Michigan 13	January 3, 1965	Dean of the House; Ranking Member: Judiciary
2	Charles Rangel	D	New York 13	January 3, 1971	
3	Don Young	R	Alaska at-large	March 6, 1973	
4	Jim Sensenbrenner	R	Wisconsin 5	January 3, 1979	
5	Hal Rogers	R	Kentucky 5	January 3, 1981	Chair: Appropriations
6	Chris Smith	R	New Jersey 4	January 3, 1981	
7	Steny Hoyer	D	Maryland 5	May 19, 1981	Minority Whip
8	Marcy Kaptur	D	Ohio 9	January 3, 1983	
9	Sander Levin	D	Michigan 9	January 3, 1983	Ranking Member: Ways and Means
10	Joe Barton	R	Texas 6	January 3, 1985	
11	Pete Visclosky	D	Indiana 1	January 3, 1985	
12	Peter DeFazio	D	Oregon 4	January 3, 1987	Ranking Member: Transportation and Infrastructure
13	John Lewis	D	Georgia 5	January 3, 1987	
14	Louise Slaughter	D	New York 25	January 3, 1987	Ranking Member: Rules
15	Lamar Smith	R	Texas 21	January 3, 1987	Chair: Science, Space and Technology
16	Fred Upton	R	Michigan 6	January 3, 1987	Chair: Energy and Commerce
17	Nancy Pelosi	D	California 12	June 2, 1987	Minority Leader
18	Jimmy Duncan	R	Tennessee 2	November 8, 1988	
19	Frank Pallone	D	New Jersey 6	November 8, 1988	Ranking Member: Energy and Commerce
20	Eliot Engel	D	New York 16	January 3, 1989	Ranking Member: Foreign Affairs
21	Nita Lowey	D	New York 17	January 3, 1989	Ranking Member: Appropriations
22	Jim McDermott	D	Washington 7	January 3, 1989	
23	Richard Neal	D	Massachusetts 1	January 3, 1989	
24	Dana Rohrabacher	R	California 48	January 3, 1989	
25	Ileana Ros-Lehtinen	R	Florida 27	August 29, 1989	
26	José E. Serrano	D	New York 15	March 20, 1990	
27	David Price	D	North Carolina 4	January 3, 1997; Previous service, 1987–1995.	
28	John Boehner	R	Ohio 8	January 3, 1991	Speaker of the House; Resigned on October 31, 2015.
29	Rosa DeLauro	D	Connecticut 3	January 3, 1991	
30	Collin Peterson	D	Minnesota 7	January 3, 1991	Ranking Member: Agriculture
31	Maxine Waters	D	California 43	January 3, 1991	Ranking Member: Financial Services
32	Sam Johnson	R	Texas 3	May 8, 1991	
33	Jerry Nadler	D	New York 10	November 3, 1992	
34	Jim Cooper	D	Tennessee 5	January 3, 2003; Previous service, 1983–1995.	
35	Xavier Becerra	D	California 34	January 3, 1993	Democratic Caucus Chairman
36	Sanford Bishop	D	Georgia 2	January 3, 1993	
37	Corrine Brown	D	Florida 5	January 3, 1993	Ranking Member: Veterans' Affairs
38	Ken Calvert	R	California 42	January 3, 1993	
39	Jim Clyburn	D	South Carolina 6	January 3, 1993	Assistant Minority Leader
40	Anna Eshoo	D	California 18	January 3, 1993	
41	Bob Goodlatte	R	Virginia 6	January 3, 1993	Chair: Judiciary
42	Gene Green	D	Texas 29	January 3, 1993	
43	Luis Gutiérrez	D	Illinois 4	January 3, 1993	
44	Alcee Hastings	D	Florida 20	January 3, 1993	
45	Eddie Bernice Johnson	D	Texas 30	January 3, 1993	Ranking Member: Science, Space and Technology
46	Peter T. King	R	New York 2	January 3, 1993	
47	Carolyn Maloney	D	New York 12	January 3, 1993	
48	John Mica	R	Florida 7	January 3, 1993	
49	Lucille Roybal-Allard	D	California 40	January 3, 1993	
50	Ed Royce	R	California 39	January 3, 1993	Chair: Foreign Affairs
51	Bobby Rush	D	Illinois 1	January 3, 1993	
52	Bobby Scott	D	Virginia 3	January 3, 1993	Ranking Member: Education and the Workforce
53	Nydia Velázquez	D	New York 7	January 3, 1993	Ranking Member: Small Business
54	Bennie Thompson	D	Mississippi 2	April 13, 1993	Ranking Member: Homeland Security
55	Sam Farr	D	California 20	June 8, 1993	
56	Frank Lucas	R	Oklahoma 3	May 10, 1994	
57	Lloyd Doggett	D	Texas 35	January 3, 1995	
58	Mike Doyle	D	Pennsylvania 14	January 3, 1995	
59	Chaka Fattah	D	Pennsylvania 2	January 3, 1995	Resigned on June 23, 2016.
60	Rodney Frelinghuysen	R	New Jersey 11	January 3, 1995	
61	Sheila Jackson Lee	D	Texas 18	January 3, 1995	
62	Walter B. Jones Jr.	R	North Carolina 3	January 3, 1995	
63	Frank LoBiondo	R	New Jersey 2	January 3, 1995	
64	Zoe Lofgren	D	California 19	January 3, 1995	
65	Mac Thornberry	R	Texas 13	January 3, 1995	Chair: Armed Services
66	Ed Whitfield	R	Kentucky 1	January 3, 1995	Resigned on September 6, 2016.
67	Elijah Cummings	D	Maryland 7	April 16, 1996	Ranking Member: Oversight and Government Reform
68	Earl Blumenauer	D	Oregon 3	May 21, 1996	
69	Robert Aderholt	R	Alabama 4	January 3, 1997	
70	Kevin Brady	R	Texas 8	January 3, 1997	
71	Danny K. Davis	D	Illinois 7	January 3, 1997	
72	Diana DeGette	D	Colorado 1	January 3, 1997	
73	Kay Granger	R	Texas 12	January 3, 1997	
74	Rubén Hinojosa	D	Texas 15	January 3, 1997	
75	Ron Kind	D	Wisconsin 3	January 3, 1997	
76	Jim McGovern	D	Massachusetts 2	January 3, 1997	
77	Bill Pascrell	D	New Jersey 9	January 3, 1997	
78	Joe Pitts	R	Pennsylvania 16	January 3, 1997	
79	Loretta Sanchez	D	California 46	January 3, 1997	
80	Pete Sessions	R	Texas 32	January 3, 1997	Chair: Rules
81	Brad Sherman	D	California 30	January 3, 1997	
82	John Shimkus	R	Illinois 15	January 3, 1997	
83	Adam Smith	D	Washington 9	January 3, 1997	Ranking Member: Armed Services
84	Gregory Meeks	D	New York 5	February 3, 1998	
85	Lois Capps	D	California 24	March 10, 1998	
86	Barbara Lee	D	California 13	April 7, 1998	
87	Bob Brady	D	Pennsylvania 1	May 19, 1998	Ranking Member: House Administration
88	Steve Chabot	R	Ohio 1	January 3, 2011; Previous service, 1995–2009.	
89	Mike Capuano	D	Massachusetts 7	January 3, 1999	
90	Joe Crowley	D	New York 14	January 3, 1999	
91	John B. Larson	D	Connecticut 1	January 3, 1999	
92	Grace Napolitano	D	California 32	January 3, 1999	
93	Paul Ryan	R	Wisconsin 1	January 3, 1999	Chair: Ways and Means; Speaker of the House (beginning Oct. 29, 2015)
94	Jan Schakowsky	D	Illinois 9	January 3, 1999	
95	Mike Simpson	R	Idaho 2	January 3, 1999	
96	Mike Thompson	D	California 5	January 3, 1999	
97	Greg Walden	R	Oregon 2	January 3, 1999	
98	Lacy Clay	D	Missouri 1	January 3, 2001	
99	Ander Crenshaw	R	Florida 4	January 3, 2001	
100	John Culberson	R	Texas 7	January 3, 2001	
101	Susan Davis	D	California 53	January 3, 2001	
102	Sam Graves	R	Missouri 6	January 3, 2001	Chair: Small Business
103	Mike Honda	D	California 17	January 3, 2001	
104	Steve Israel	D	New York 3	January 3, 2001	
105	Darrell Issa	R	California 49	January 3, 2001	
106	James Langevin	D	Rhode Island 2	January 3, 2001	
107	Rick Larsen	D	Washington 2	January 3, 2001	
108	Betty McCollum	D	Minnesota 4	January 3, 2001	
109	Adam Schiff	D	California 28	January 3, 2001	Ranking Member: Intelligence
110	Pat Tiberi	R	Ohio 12	January 3, 2001	
111	Bill Shuster	R	Pennsylvania 9	May 15, 2001	Chair: Transportation and Infrastructure
112	Randy Forbes	R	Virginia 4	June 19, 2001	
113	Stephen F. Lynch	D	Massachusetts 8	October 16, 2001	
114	Jeff Miller	R	Florida 1	October 16, 2001	Chair: Veterans' Affairs
115	Joe Wilson	R	South Carolina 2	December 18, 2001	
116	Rob Bishop	R	Utah 1	January 3, 2003	Chair: Natural Resources
117	Marsha Blackburn	R	Tennessee 7	January 3, 2003	
118	Michael C. Burgess	R	Texas 26	January 3, 2003	
119	John Carter	R	Texas 31	January 3, 2003	
120	Tom Cole	R	Oklahoma 4	January 3, 2003	
121	Mario Díaz-Balart	R	Florida 25	January 3, 2003	
122	Trent Franks	R	Arizona 8	January 3, 2003	
123	Scott Garrett	R	New Jersey 5	January 3, 2003	
124	Raúl Grijalva	D	Arizona 3	January 3, 2003	Ranking Member: Natural Resources
125	Jeb Hensarling	R	Texas 5	January 3, 2003	Chair: Financial Services
126	Steve King	R	Iowa 4	January 3, 2003	
127	John Kline	R	Minnesota 2	January 3, 2003	Chair: Education and the Workforce
128	Candice Miller	R	Michigan 10	January 3, 2003	Chair: House Administration; Resigned on December 31, 2016.
129	Tim Murphy	R	Pennsylvania 18	January 3, 2003	
130	Devin Nunes	R	California 22	January 3, 2003	Chair: Intelligence
131	Mike Rogers	R	Alabama 3	January 3, 2003	
132	Dutch Ruppersberger	D	Maryland 2	January 3, 2003	
133	Tim Ryan	D	Ohio 13	January 3, 2003	
134	Linda Sánchez	D	California 38	January 3, 2003	Ranking Member: Ethics
135	David Scott	D	Georgia 13	January 3, 2003	
136	Mike Turner	R	Ohio 10	January 3, 2003	
137	Chris Van Hollen	D	Maryland 8	January 3, 2003	Ranking Member: Budget
138	Randy Neugebauer	R	Texas 19	June 3, 2003	
139	G. K. Butterfield	D	North Carolina 1	July 20, 2004	
140	Charles Boustany	R	Louisiana 3	January 3, 2005	
141	Emanuel Cleaver	D	Missouri 5	January 3, 2005	
142	Mike Conaway	R	Texas 11	January 3, 2005	Chair: Agriculture
143	Jim Costa	D	California 16	January 3, 2005	
144	Henry Cuellar	D	Texas 28	January 3, 2005	
145	Charlie Dent	R	Pennsylvania 15	January 3, 2005	Chair: Ethics
146	Jeff Fortenberry	R	Nebraska 1	January 3, 2005	
147	Virginia Foxx	R	North Carolina 5	January 3, 2005	
148	Louie Gohmert	R	Texas 1	January 3, 2005	
149	Al Green	D	Texas 9	January 3, 2005	
150	Brian Higgins	D	New York 26	January 3, 2005	
151	Dan Lipinski	D	Illinois 3	January 3, 2005	
152	Kenny Marchant	R	Texas 24	January 3, 2005	
153	Michael McCaul	R	Texas 10	January 3, 2005	Chair: Homeland Security
154	Patrick McHenry	R	North Carolina 10	January 3, 2005	
155	Cathy McMorris Rodgers	R	Washington 5	January 3, 2005	Republican Conference Chairwoman
156	Gwen Moore	D	Wisconsin 4	January 3, 2005	
157	Ted Poe	R	Texas 2	January 3, 2005	
158	Tom Price	R	Georgia 6	January 3, 2005	Chair: Budget
159	Dave Reichert	R	Washington 8	January 3, 2005	
160	Debbie Wasserman Schultz	D	Florida 23	January 3, 2005	
161	Lynn Westmoreland	R	Georgia 3	January 3, 2005	
162	Doris Matsui	D	California 6	March 8, 2005	
163	Albio Sires	D	New Jersey 8	November 7, 2006	
164	Steve Pearce	R	New Mexico 2	January 3, 2011; Previous service, 2003–2009.	
165	Gus Bilirakis	R	Florida 12	January 3, 2007	
166	Vern Buchanan	R	Florida 16	January 3, 2007	
167	Kathy Castor	D	Florida 14	January 3, 2007	
168	Yvette Clarke	D	New York 9	January 3, 2007	
169	Steve Cohen	D	Tennessee 9	January 3, 2007	
170	Joe Courtney	D	Connecticut 2	January 3, 2007	
171	Keith Ellison	D	Minnesota 5	January 3, 2007	
172	Hank Johnson	D	Georgia 4	January 3, 2007	
173	Jim Jordan	R	Ohio 4	January 3, 2007	
174	Doug Lamborn	R	Colorado 5	January 3, 2007	
175	Dave Loebsack	D	Iowa 2	January 3, 2007	
176	Kevin McCarthy	R	California 23	January 3, 2007	Majority Leader
177	Jerry McNerney	D	California 9	January 3, 2007	
178	Ed Perlmutter	D	Colorado 7	January 3, 2007	
179	Peter Roskam	R	Illinois 6	January 3, 2007	
180	John Sarbanes	D	Maryland 3	January 3, 2007	
181	Adrian Smith	R	Nebraska 3	January 3, 2007	
182	Tim Walz	D	Minnesota 1	January 3, 2007	
183	Peter Welch	D	Vermont at-large	January 3, 2007	
184	John Yarmuth	D	Kentucky 3	January 3, 2007	
185	Niki Tsongas	D	Massachusetts 3	October 16, 2007	
186	Bob Latta	R	Ohio 5	December 11, 2007	
187	Rob Wittman	R	Virginia 1	December 11, 2007	
188	André Carson	D	Indiana 7	March 11, 2008	
189	Jackie Speier	D	California 14	April 8, 2008	
190	Steve Scalise	R	Louisiana 1	May 3, 2008	Majority Whip
191	Donna Edwards	D	Maryland 4	June 17, 2008	
192	Marcia Fudge	D	Ohio 11	November 18, 2008	
193	Rick Nolan	D	Minnesota 8	January 3, 2013; Previous service, 1975–1981.	
194	Matt Salmon	R	Arizona 5	January 3, 2013; Previous service, 1995–2001.	
195	Mark Sanford	R	South Carolina 1	May 7, 2013; Previous service, 1995–2001.	
196	Jason Chaffetz	R	Utah 3	January 3, 2009	Chair: Oversight and Government Reform
197	Mike Coffman	R	Colorado 6	January 3, 2009	
198	Gerry Connolly	D	Virginia 11	January 3, 2009	
199	John Fleming	R	Louisiana 4	January 3, 2009	
200	Brett Guthrie	R	Kentucky 2	January 3, 2009	
201	Gregg Harper	R	Mississippi 3	January 3, 2009	
202	Jim Himes	D	Connecticut 4	January 3, 2009	
203	Duncan D. Hunter	R	California 50	January 3, 2009	
204	Lynn Jenkins	R	Kansas 2	January 3, 2009	
205	Leonard Lance	R	New Jersey 7	January 3, 2009	
206	Blaine Luetkemeyer	R	Missouri 3	January 3, 2009	
207	Ben Ray Luján	D	New Mexico 3	January 3, 2009	
208	Cynthia Lummis	R	Wyoming at-large	January 3, 2009	
209	Tom McClintock	R	California 4	January 3, 2009	
210	Pete Olson	R	Texas 22	January 3, 2009	
211	Erik Paulsen	R	Minnesota 3	January 3, 2009	
212	Chellie Pingree	D	Maine 1	January 3, 2009	
213	Jared Polis	D	Colorado 2	January 3, 2009	
214	Bill Posey	R	Florida 8	January 3, 2009	
215	Phil Roe	R	Tennessee 1	January 3, 2009	
216	Tom Rooney	R	Florida 17	January 3, 2009	
217	Aaron Schock	R	Illinois 18	January 3, 2009	Resigned on March 31, 2015.
218	Kurt Schrader	D	Oregon 5	January 3, 2009	
219	Glenn Thompson	R	Pennsylvania 5	January 3, 2009	
220	Paul Tonko	D	New York 20	January 3, 2009	
221	Mike Quigley	D	Illinois 5	April 7, 2009	
222	Judy Chu	D	California 27	July 14, 2009	
223	John Garamendi	D	California 3	November 3, 2009	
224	Ted Deutch	D	Florida 21	April 13, 2010	
225	Tom Graves	R	Georgia 14	June 8, 2010	
226	Tom Reed	R	New York 23	November 2, 2010	
227	Marlin Stutzman	R	Indiana 3	November 2, 2010	
228	Mike Fitzpatrick	R	Pennsylvania 8	January 3, 2011; Previous service, 2005–2007.	
229	Tim Walberg	R	Michigan 7	January 3, 2011; Previous service, 2007–2009.	
230	Bill Foster	D	Illinois 11	January 3, 2013; Previous service, 2008–2011.	
231	Justin Amash	R	Michigan 3	January 3, 2011	
232	Lou Barletta	R	Pennsylvania 11	January 3, 2011	
233	Karen Bass	D	California 37	January 3, 2011	
234	Dan Benishek	R	Michigan 1	January 3, 2011	
235	Diane Black	R	Tennessee 6	January 3, 2011	
236	Mo Brooks	R	Alabama 5	January 3, 2011	
237	Larry Bucshon	R	Indiana 8	January 3, 2011	
238	John Carney	D	Delaware at-large	January 3, 2011	
239	David Cicilline	D	Rhode Island 1	January 3, 2011	
240	Rick Crawford	R	Arkansas 1	January 3, 2011	
241	Jeff Denham	R	California 10	January 3, 2011	
242	Scott DesJarlais	R	Tennessee 4	January 3, 2011	
243	Sean Duffy	R	Wisconsin 7	January 3, 2011	
244	Jeff Duncan	R	South Carolina 3	January 3, 2011	
245	Renee Ellmers	R	North Carolina 2	January 3, 2011	
246	Blake Farenthold	R	Texas 27	January 3, 2011	
247	Stephen Fincher	R	Tennessee 8	January 3, 2011	
248	Chuck Fleischmann	R	Tennessee 3	January 3, 2011	
249	Bill Flores	R	Texas 17	January 3, 2011	
250	Bob Gibbs	R	Ohio 7	January 3, 2011	
251	Chris Gibson	R	New York 19	January 3, 2011	
252	Paul Gosar	R	Arizona 4	January 3, 2011	
253	Trey Gowdy	R	South Carolina 4	January 3, 2011	
254	Morgan Griffith	R	Virginia 9	January 3, 2011	
255	Michael Grimm	R	New York 11	January 3, 2011	Resigned on January 5, 2015.
256	Richard L. Hanna	R	New York 22	January 3, 2011	
257	Andy Harris	R	Maryland 1	January 3, 2011	
258	Vicky Hartzler	R	Missouri 4	January 3, 2011	
259	Joe Heck	R	Nevada 3	January 3, 2011	
260	Jaime Herrera Beutler	R	Washington 3	January 3, 2011	
261	Tim Huelskamp	R	Kansas 1	January 3, 2011	
262	Bill Huizenga	R	Michigan 2	January 3, 2011	
263	Randy Hultgren	R	Illinois 14	January 3, 2011	
264	Robert Hurt	R	Virginia 5	January 3, 2011	
265	Bill Johnson	R	Ohio 6	January 3, 2011	
266	Bill Keating	D	Massachusetts 9	January 3, 2011	
267	Mike Kelly	R	Pennsylvania 3	January 3, 2011	
268	Adam Kinzinger	R	Illinois 16	January 3, 2011	
269	Raúl Labrador	R	Idaho 1	January 3, 2011	
270	Billy Long	R	Missouri 7	January 3, 2011	
271	Tom Marino	R	Pennsylvania 10	January 3, 2011	
272	David McKinley	R	West Virginia 1	January 3, 2011	
273	Pat Meehan	R	Pennsylvania 7	January 3, 2011	
274	Mick Mulvaney	R	South Carolina 5	January 3, 2011	
275	Kristi Noem	R	South Dakota at-large	January 3, 2011	
276	Rich Nugent	R	Florida 11	January 3, 2011	
277	Alan Nunnelee	R	Mississippi 1	January 3, 2011	Died on February 6, 2015.
278	Steven Palazzo	R	Mississippi 4	January 3, 2011	
279	Mike Pompeo	R	Kansas 4	January 3, 2011	
280	Jim Renacci	R	Ohio 16	January 3, 2011	
281	Reid Ribble	R	Wisconsin 8	January 3, 2011	
282	Cedric Richmond	D	Louisiana 2	January 3, 2011	
283	Scott Rigell	R	Virginia 2	January 3, 2011	
284	Martha Roby	R	Alabama 2	January 3, 2011	
285	Todd Rokita	R	Indiana 4	January 3, 2011	
286	Dennis Ross	R	Florida 15	January 3, 2011	
287	David Schweikert	R	Arizona 6	January 3, 2011	
288	Austin Scott	R	Georgia 8	January 3, 2011	
289	Terri Sewell	D	Alabama 7	January 3, 2011	
290	Steve Stivers	R	Ohio 15	January 3, 2011	
291	Scott Tipton	R	Colorado 3	January 3, 2011	
292	Daniel Webster	R	Florida 10	January 3, 2011	
293	Frederica Wilson	D	Florida 24	January 3, 2011	
294	Steve Womack	R	Arkansas 3	January 3, 2011	
295	Rob Woodall	R	Georgia 7	January 3, 2011	
296	Kevin Yoder	R	Kansas 3	January 3, 2011	
297	Todd Young	R	Indiana 9	January 3, 2011	
298	Janice Hahn	D	California 44	July 12, 2011	Resigned on December 4, 2016.
299	Mark Amodei	R	Nevada 2	September 13, 2011	
300	Suzanne Bonamici	D	Oregon 1	January 31, 2012	
301	Suzan DelBene	D	Washington 1	November 6, 2012	
302	Thomas Massie	R	Kentucky 4	November 6, 2012	
303	Donald Payne Jr.	D	New Jersey 10	November 6, 2012	
304	Alan Grayson	D	Florida 9	January 3, 2013; Previous service, 2009–2011.	
305	Ann Kirkpatrick	D	Arizona 1	January 3, 2013; Previous service, 2009–2011.	
306	Dina Titus	D	Nevada 1	January 3, 2013; Previous service, 2009–2011.	
307	Andy Barr	R	Kentucky 6	January 3, 2013	
308	Joyce Beatty	D	Ohio 3	January 3, 2013	
309	Ami Bera	D	California 7	January 3, 2013	
310	Jim Bridenstine	R	Oklahoma 1	January 3, 2013	
311	Susan Brooks	R	Indiana 5	January 3, 2013	
312	Julia Brownley	D	California 26	January 3, 2013	
313	Cheri Bustos	D	Illinois 17	January 3, 2013	
314	Tony Cárdenas	D	California 29	January 3, 2013	
315	Matt Cartwright	D	Pennsylvania 17	January 3, 2013	
316	Joaquin Castro	D	Texas 20	January 3, 2013	
317	Chris Collins	R	New York 27	January 3, 2013	
318	Doug Collins	R	Georgia 9	January 3, 2013	
319	Paul Cook	R	California 8	January 3, 2013	
320	Kevin Cramer	R	North Dakota at-large	January 3, 2013	
321	Rodney Davis	R	Illinois 13	January 3, 2013	
322	John Delaney	D	Maryland 6	January 3, 2013	
323	Ron DeSantis	R	Florida 6	January 3, 2013	
324	Tammy Duckworth	D	Illinois 8	January 3, 2013	
325	Elizabeth Esty	D	Connecticut 5	January 3, 2013	
326	Lois Frankel	D	Florida 22	January 3, 2013	
327	Tulsi Gabbard	D	Hawaii 2	January 3, 2013	
328	Denny Heck	D	Washington 10	January 3, 2013	
329	George Holding	R	North Carolina 13	January 3, 2013	
330	Richard Hudson	R	North Carolina 8	January 3, 2013	
331	Jared Huffman	D	California 2	January 3, 2013	
332	Hakeem Jeffries	D	New York 8	January 3, 2013	
333	David Joyce	R	Ohio 14	January 3, 2013	
334	Joe Kennedy III	D	Massachusetts 4	January 3, 2013	
335	Dan Kildee	D	Michigan 5	January 3, 2013	
336	Derek Kilmer	D	Washington 6	January 3, 2013	
337	Annie Kuster	D	New Hampshire 2	January 3, 2013	
338	Doug LaMalfa	R	California 1	January 3, 2013	
339	Alan Lowenthal	D	California 47	January 3, 2013	
340	Michelle Lujan Grisham	D	New Mexico 1	January 3, 2013	
341	Sean Patrick Maloney	D	New York 18	January 3, 2013	
342	Mark Meadows	R	North Carolina 11	January 3, 2013	
343	Grace Meng	D	New York 6	January 3, 2013	
344	Luke Messer	R	Indiana 6	January 3, 2013	
345	Markwayne Mullin	R	Oklahoma 2	January 3, 2013	
346	Patrick Murphy	D	Florida 18	January 3, 2013	
347	Beto O'Rourke	D	Texas 16	January 3, 2013	
348	Scott Perry	R	Pennsylvania 4	January 3, 2013	
349	Scott Peters	D	California 52	January 3, 2013	
350	Robert Pittenger	R	North Carolina 9	January 3, 2013	
351	Mark Pocan	D	Wisconsin 2	January 3, 2013	
352	Tom Rice	R	South Carolina 7	January 3, 2013	
353	Keith Rothfus	R	Pennsylvania 12	January 3, 2013	
354	Raul Ruiz	D	California 36	January 3, 2013	
355	Kyrsten Sinema	D	Arizona 9	January 3, 2013	
356	Chris Stewart	R	Utah 2	January 3, 2013	
357	Eric Swalwell	D	California 15	January 3, 2013	
358	Mark Takano	D	California 41	January 3, 2013	
359	David Valadao	R	California 21	January 3, 2013	
360	Juan Vargas	D	California 51	January 3, 2013	
361	Marc Veasey	D	Texas 33	January 3, 2013	
362	Filemon Vela Jr.	D	Texas 34	January 3, 2013	
363	Ann Wagner	R	Missouri 2	January 3, 2013	
364	Jackie Walorski	R	Indiana 2	January 3, 2013	
365	Randy Weber	R	Texas 14	January 3, 2013	
366	Brad Wenstrup	R	Ohio 2	January 3, 2013	
367	Roger Williams	R	Texas 25	January 3, 2013	
368	Ted Yoho	R	Florida 3	January 3, 2013	
369	Robin Kelly	D	Illinois 2	April 9, 2013	
370	Jason Smith	R	Missouri 8	June 4, 2013	
371	Katherine Clark	D	Massachusetts 5	December 10, 2013	
372	Bradley Byrne	R	Alabama 1	December 17, 2013	
373	David Jolly	R	Florida 13	March 11, 2014	
374	Curt Clawson	R	Florida 19	June 24, 2014	
375	Alma Adams	D	North Carolina 12	November 4, 2014	
376	Dave Brat	R	Virginia 7	November 4, 2014	
377	Donald Norcross	D	New Jersey 1	November 4, 2014	
378	Bob Dold	R	Illinois 10	January 3, 2015; Previous service, 2011–2013.	
379	Frank Guinta	R	New Hampshire 1	January 3, 2015; Previous service, 2011–2013.	
380	Ralph Abraham	R	Louisiana 5	January 3, 2015	
381	Pete Aguilar	D	California 31	January 3, 2015	
382	Rick W. Allen	R	Georgia 12	January 3, 2015	
383	Brad Ashford	D	Nebraska 2	January 3, 2015	
384	Brian Babin	R	Texas 36	January 3, 2015	
385	Don Beyer	D	Virginia 8	January 3, 2015	
386	Mike Bishop	R	Michigan 8	January 3, 2015	
387	Rod Blum	R	Iowa 1	January 3, 2015	
388	Mike Bost	R	Illinois 12	January 3, 2015	
389	Brendan Boyle	D	Pennsylvania 13	January 3, 2015	
390	Ken Buck	R	Colorado 4	January 3, 2015	
391	Buddy Carter	R	Georgia 1	January 3, 2015	
392	Barbara Comstock	R	Virginia 10	January 3, 2015	
393	Ryan Costello	R	Pennsylvania 6	January 3, 2015	
394	Carlos Curbelo	R	Florida 26	January 3, 2015	
395	Mark DeSaulnier	D	California 11	January 3, 2015	
396	Debbie Dingell	D	Michigan 12	January 3, 2015	
397	Tom Emmer	R	Minnesota 6	January 3, 2015	
398	Ruben Gallego	D	Arizona 7	January 3, 2015	
399	Gwen Graham	D	Florida 2	January 3, 2015	
400	Garret Graves	R	Louisiana 6	January 3, 2015	
401	Glenn Grothman	R	Wisconsin 6	January 3, 2015	
402	Cresent Hardy	R	Nevada 4	January 3, 2015	
403	Jody Hice	R	Georgia 10	January 3, 2015	
404	French Hill	R	Arkansas 2	January 3, 2015	
405	Will Hurd	R	Texas 23	January 3, 2015	
406	Evan Jenkins	R	West Virginia 3	January 3, 2015	
407	John Katko	R	New York 24	January 3, 2015	
408	Steve Knight	R	California 25	January 3, 2015	
409	Brenda Lawrence	D	Michigan 14	January 3, 2015	
410	Ted Lieu	D	California 33	January 3, 2015	
411	Barry Loudermilk	R	Georgia 11	January 3, 2015	
412	Mia Love	R	Utah 4	January 3, 2015	
413	Tom MacArthur	R	New Jersey 3	January 3, 2015	
414	Martha McSally	R	Arizona 2	January 3, 2015	
415	John Moolenaar	R	Michigan 4	January 3, 2015	
416	Alex Mooney	R	West Virginia 2	January 3, 2015	
417	Seth Moulton	D	Massachusetts 6	January 3, 2015	
418	Dan Newhouse	R	Washington 4	January 3, 2015	
419	Gary Palmer	R	Alabama 6	January 3, 2015	
420	Bruce Poliquin	R	Maine 2	January 3, 2015	
421	John Ratcliffe	R	Texas 4	January 3, 2015	
422	Kathleen Rice	D	New York 4	January 3, 2015	
423	David Rouzer	R	North Carolina 7	January 3, 2015	
424	Steve Russell	R	Oklahoma 5	January 3, 2015	
425	Elise Stefanik	R	New York 21	January 3, 2015	
426	Mark Takai	D	Hawaii 1	January 3, 2015	Died on July 20, 2016.
427	Norma Torres	D	California 35	January 3, 2015	
428	Dave Trott	R	Michigan 11	January 3, 2015	
429	Mark Walker	R	North Carolina 6	January 3, 2015	
430	Mimi Walters	R	California 45	January 3, 2015	
431	Bonnie Watson Coleman	D	New Jersey 12	January 3, 2015	
432	Bruce Westerman	R	Arkansas 4	January 3, 2015	
433	David Young	R	Iowa 3	January 3, 2015	
434	Lee Zeldin	R	New York 1	January 3, 2015	
435	Ryan Zinke	R	Montana at-large	January 3, 2015	
	Dan Donovan	R	New York 11	May 5, 2015	
	Trent Kelly	R	Mississippi 1	June 2, 2015	
	Darin LaHood	R	Illinois 18	September 10, 2015	
	Warren Davidson	R	Ohio 8	June 7, 2016	
	Colleen Hanabusa	D	Hawaii 1	November 8, 2016; Previous service, 2011–2015.	
	James Comer	R	Kentucky 1	November 8, 2016	
	Dwight Evans	D	Pennsylvania 2	November 8, 2016	

== Delegates ==
Rank	Delegate	Party	District	Seniority date (Previous service, if any)	Notes
1	Eleanor Holmes Norton	D	DC	January 3, 1991	
2	Madeleine Bordallo	D	GU	January 3, 2003	
3	Pedro Pierluisi	NPP/D	PR	January 3, 2009	
4	Gregorio Sablan	D	NMI	January 3, 2009	
5	Stacey Plaskett	D	VI	January 3, 2015	
6	Amata Coleman Radewagen	R	AS	January 3, 2015	

== See also ==
- 114th United States Congress
- List of U.S. congressional districts
- List of United States senators in the 114th Congress
