= List of new members of the 111th United States Congress =

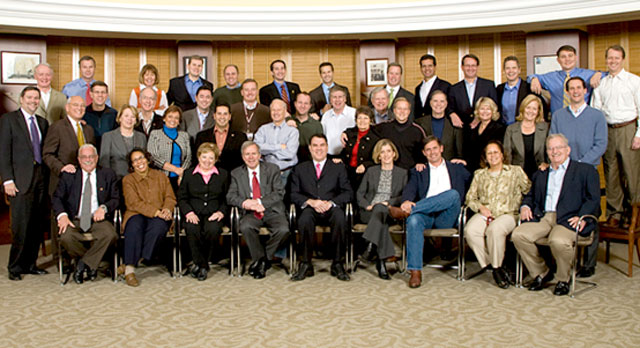
40 new members of the 111th Congress. (Note: One pictured member, Marcia Fudge, is not technically a freshman; as she was sworn in near the end of the 110th Congress.)

The 111th United States Congress began on January 3, 2009. There were nine new senators (seven Democrats, two Republicans) and 54 new representatives (32 Democrats, 22 Republicans), as well as two new delegates (one Democrat, one independent), at the start of its first session. Additionally, 12 senators (nine Democrats, three Republicans) and 11 representatives (seven Democrats, four Republicans) took office on various dates in order to fill vacancies during the 111th Congress before it ended on January 3, 2011.

The presidents of the House Democratic freshman class were Gerry Connolly of Virginia and Martin Heinrich of New Mexico, while the president of the House Republican freshman class was Steve Austria of Ohio.

== Senate ==
=== Took office January 3, 2009 ===
State	Image	Senator	Seniority	Switched party	Prior background	Birth year	Ref
Alaska		Mark Begich (D)	9th (98th overall)	Yes; Defeated Ted Stevens (R)	Mayor of Anchorage; Anchorage Assembly	1962	
Colorado (Class 2)		Mark Udall (D)	1st (90th overall)	Yes; Open seat; replaced Wayne Allard (R)	U.S. House of Representatives (Note: Elected to the 106th Congress, serving from 1999 to 2009 in Colorado's 2nd district.); Colorado House of Representatives; Executive director of Outward Bound	1950	
Idaho		Jim Risch (R)	6th (95th overall)	No; Open seat; replaced Larry Craig (R)	Governor of Idaho; Lieutenant Governor of Idaho; President pro tempore of the Idaho Senate; Ada County Prosecutor	1943	
Nebraska		Mike Johanns (R)	3rd (92nd overall)	No; Open seat; replaced Chuck Hagel (R)	U.S. Secretary of Agriculture; Governor of Nebraska; Mayor of Lincoln; Lancaster County Board of Commissioners	1950	
New Hampshire		Jeanne Shaheen (D)	4th (93rd overall)	Yes; Defeated John E. Sununu (R)	Governor of New Hampshire; New Hampshire Senate	1947	
New Mexico		Tom Udall (D)	2nd (91st overall)	Yes; Open seat; replaced Pete Domenici (R)	U.S. House of Representatives (Note: Elected to the 106th Congress, serving from 1999 to 2009 in New Mexico's 3rd district.); Attorney General of New Mexico; Assistant U.S. Attorney	1948	
North Carolina		Kay Hagan (D)	7th (96th overall)	Yes; Defeated Elizabeth Dole (R)	North Carolina Senate	1953	
Oregon		Jeff Merkley (D)	8th (97th overall)	Yes; Defeated Gordon H. Smith (R)	Speaker of the Oregon House of Representatives	1956	
Virginia		Mark Warner (D)	5th (94th overall)	Yes; Open seat; replaced John Warner (R)	Governor of Virginia; Chair of the Democratic Party of Virginia	1954	

=== Took office during the 111th Congress ===
State	Image	Senator	Took office	Switched party	Prior background	Birth year	Ref
Illinois		Roland Burris (D)	January 15, 2009	No; Appointed; replaced Barack Obama (D)	Illinois Attorney General; Illinois Comptroller; Illinois Director of General Services; Bank examiner for Comptroller James J. Saxon	1937	
Delaware		Ted Kaufman (D)	January 16, 2009	No; Appointed; replaced Joe Biden (D)	Broadcasting Board of Governors; Chief of staff to U.S. Senator Joe Biden	1939	
Colorado (Class 3)		Michael Bennet (D)	January 21, 2009	No; Appointed; replaced Ken Salazar (D)	Superintendent of Denver Public Schools; Chief of staff to Mayor John Hickenlooper	1964	
New York		Kirsten Gillibrand (D)	January 26, 2009	No; Appointed; replaced Hillary Clinton (D)	U.S. House of Representatives (Note: Elected to the 110th Congress, serving from 2007 to 2009 in New York's 20th district.); Special counsel to Secretary Andrew Cuomo	1966	
Minnesota		Al Franken (DFL)	July 7, 2009 (Note: Franklin was narrowly elected in November 2008, but chose to wait the decision to the Minnesota Supreme Court for the tally of the recount.)	Yes; Defeated Norm Coleman (R)	Comedian; Host of The Al Franken Show	1951	
Florida		George LeMieux (R)	September 9, 2009	No; Appointed; replaced Mel Martínez (R)	Chief of staff to Governor Charlie Crist; Deputy Florida Attorney General; Chair of the Broward County Republican Party	1969	
Massachusetts		Paul G. Kirk (D)	September 24, 2009	No; Appointed; replaced Ted Kennedy (D)	Chair of the Democratic National Committee; Democratic National Committee Treasurer	1938	
Massachusetts		Scott Brown (R)	February 4, 2010	Yes; Open seat; replaced Paul G. Kirk (D)	Massachusetts Senate; Massachusetts House of Representatives; Wrentham Selectman; U.S. Army Judge Advocate General's Corps	1959	
West Virginia		Carte Goodwin (D)	July 16, 2010	No; Appointed; replaced Robert Byrd (D)	Chief counsel to Governor Joe Manchin	1974	
Delaware		Chris Coons (D)	November 15, 2010	No; Open seat; replaced Ted Kaufman (D)	New Castle County Executive; New Castle County Council	1963	
West Virginia		Joe Manchin (D)	November 15, 2010	No; Open seat; replaced Carte Goodwin (D)	Governor of West Virginia; Secretary of State of West Virginia; West Virginia Senate; West Virginia House of Delegates	1947	
Illinois		Mark Kirk (R)	November 29, 2010	Yes; Open seat; replaced Roland Burris (D)	U.S. House of Representatives (Note: Elected to the 107th Congress, serving from 2001 to 2010 in Illinois's 10th district.); U.S. Navy Reserve	1959	

== House of Representatives ==
=== Took office January 3, 2009 ===
District	Image	Representative	Switched party	Prior background	Birth year	Ref
Alabama 2		Bobby Bright (D)	Yes; Open seat; replaced Terry Everett (R)	Mayor of Montgomery	1952	
Alabama 5		Parker Griffith (D)	No (Note: Griffith joined the Republican Party in December 2009.); Open seat; replaced Bud Cramer (D)	Alabama Senate; U.S. Army Medical Corps	1942	
Arizona 1		Ann Kirkpatrick (D)	Yes; Open seat; replaced Rick Renzi (R)	Arizona House of Representatives	1950	
California 4		Tom McClintock (R)	No; Open seat; replaced John Doolittle (R)	California State Senate; California State Assembly	1956	
California 52		Duncan D. Hunter (R)	No; Open seat; replaced Duncan L. Hunter (R)	Real estate developer U.S. Marine Corps Major	1976	
Colorado 2		Jared Polis (D)	No; Open seat; replaced Mark Udall (D)	Colorado State Board of Education	1975	
Colorado 4		Betsy Markey (D)	Yes; Defeated Marilyn Musgrave (R)	Legislative aide	1956	
Colorado 6		Mike Coffman (R)	No; Open seat; replaced Tom Tancredo (R)	Secretary of State of Colorado; Colorado State Treasurer; Colorado Senate; Colorado House of Representatives; U.S. Marine Corps Major	1955	
Connecticut 4		Jim Himes (D)	Yes; Defeated Chris Shays (R)	Greenwich Housing Authority; Vice President of Goldman Sachs	1966	
Florida 8		Alan Grayson (D)	Yes; Defeated Ric Keller (R)	Businessman	1958	
Florida 15		Bill Posey (R)	No; Open seat; replaced Dave Weldon (R)	Florida Senate; Florida House of Representatives; Rockledge City Council	1947	
Florida 16		Tom Rooney (R)	Yes; Defeated Tim Mahoney (D)	U.S. Army Judge Advocate General's Corps	1970	
Florida 24		Suzanne Kosmas (D)	Yes; Defeated Tom Feeney (R)	Florida House of Representatives	1944	
Idaho 1		Walt Minnick (D)	Yes; Defeated Bill Sali (R)	Staff assistant to President Richard Nixon; U.S. Army First Lieutenant	1942	
Illinois 11		Debbie Halvorson (D)	Yes; Open seat; replaced Jerry Weller (R)	Illinois Senate; Crete Township Clerk	1958	
Illinois 18		Aaron Schock (R)	No; Open seat; replaced Ray LaHood (R)	Illinois House of Representatives; Peoria Board of Education	1981	
Kansas 2		Lynn Jenkins (R)	Yes; Defeated Nancy Boyda (D)	Kansas State Treasurer; Kansas Senate; Kansas House of Representatives	1963	
Kentucky 2		Brett Guthrie (R)	No; Open seat; replaced Ron Lewis (R)	Kentucky Senate; U.S. Army First Lieutenant	1964	
Louisiana 2		Joseph Cao (R)	Yes; Defeated William Jefferson (D)	Professional advocate	1967	
Louisiana 4		John Fleming (R)	No; Open seat; replaced Jim McCrery (R)	Webster Parish Coroner; U.S. Navy	1951	
Louisiana 6		Bill Cassidy (R)	Yes; Defeated Don Cazayoux (D)	Louisiana State Senate; Physician	1957	
Maine 1		Chellie Pingree (D)	No; Open seat; replaced Tom Allen (D)	Maine Senate	1955	
Maryland 1		Frank Kratovil (D)	Yes; Replaced Wayne Gilchrest (R), who was defeated in a primary	Queen Anne's County State's Attorney	1968	
Michigan 7		Mark Schauer (D)	Yes; Defeated Tim Walberg (R)	Michigan Senate; Michigan House of Representatives; Battle Creek City Commission	1961	
Michigan 9		Gary Peters (D)	Yes; Defeated Joe Knollenberg (R)	Michigan Lottery Commissioner; Michigan Senate; Rochester Hills City Council; Navy Supply Corps Lieutenant Commander	1958	
Minnesota 3		Erik Paulsen (R)	No; Open seat; replaced Jim Ramstad (R)	Minnesota House of Representatives	1965	
Mississippi 3		Gregg Harper (R)	No; Open seat; replaced Chip Pickering (R)	Brandon City Prosecutor; Richland City Prosecutor; Chair of the Rankin County Republican Party	1956	
Missouri 9		Blaine Luetkemeyer (R)	No; Open seat; replaced Kenny Hulshof (R)	Missouri Tourism Director; Missouri House of Representatives; St. Elizabeth Board of Trustees	1952	
Nevada 3		Dina Titus (D)	Yes; Defeated Jon Porter (R)	Nevada Senate; Political science professor	1950	
New Jersey 3		John Adler (D)	Yes; Open seat; replaced Jim Saxton (R)	New Jersey Senate; Cherry Hill Township Council	1959	
New Jersey 7		Leonard Lance (R)	No; Open seat; replaced Mike Ferguson (R)	New Jersey Senate; New Jersey General Assembly	1952	
New Mexico 1		Martin Heinrich (D)	Yes; Open seat; replaced Heather Wilson (R)	Albuquerque City Council	1971	
New Mexico 2		Harry Teague (D)	Yes; Open seat; replaced Steve Pearce (R)	Lea County Board of Commissioners	1949	
New Mexico 3		Ben Ray Luján (D)	No; Open seat; replaced Tom Udall (D)	New Mexico Public Regulation Commission	1972	
New York 13		Michael McMahon (D)	Yes; Open seat; replaced Vito Fossella (R)	New York City Council	1957	
New York 21		Paul Tonko (D)	No; Open seat; replaced Michael McNulty (D)	President of the NYSERDA; New York State Assembly; Montgomery County Board of Supervisors	1949	
New York 25		Dan Maffei (D)	Yes; Open seat; replaced James T. Walsh (R)	Congressional staffer	1968	
New York 26		Chris Lee (R)	No; Open seat; replaced Thomas M. Reynolds (R)	Businessman	1964	
New York 29		Eric Massa (D)	Yes; Defeated Randy Kuhl (R)	Congressional staffer U.S. Navy Lieutenant Commander	1959	
North Carolina 8		Larry Kissell (D)	Yes; Defeated Robin Hayes (R)	Businessman	1951	
Ohio 1		Steve Driehaus (D)	Yes; Defeated Steve Chabot (R)	Ohio House of Representatives; Peace Corps	1966	
Ohio 7		Steve Austria (R)	No; Open seat; replaced Dave Hobson (R)	Ohio Senate; Ohio House of Representatives	1958	
Ohio 15		Mary Jo Kilroy (D)	Yes; Open seat; replaced Deborah Pryce (R)	Franklin County Board of Commissioners; Columbus Board of Education	1949	
Ohio 16		John Boccieri (D)	Yes; Open seat; replaced Ralph Regula (R)	Ohio Senate; Ohio House of Representatives; U.S. Air Force Reserve Colonel	1969	
Oregon 5		Kurt Schrader (D)	No; Open seat; replaced Darlene Hooley (D)	Oregon State Senate; Oregon House of Representatives; Veterinarian	1951	
Pennsylvania 3		Kathy Dahlkemper (D)	Yes; Defeated Phil English (R)	Co-founder of the Lake Erie Arboretum	1957	
Pennsylvania 5		Glenn Thompson (R)	No; Open seat; replaced John Peterson (R)	Chair of the Centre County Republican Party; Bald Eagle School Board; Rehabilitation therapist manager	1959	
Tennessee 1		Phil Roe (R)	No; Defeated David Davis (R) in a primary	Mayor of Johnson City; Johnson City Board of Commissioners; U.S. Army Medical Corps	1945	
Texas 22		Pete Olson (R)	Yes; Defeated Nick Lampson (D)	Congressional staffer U.S. Navy Lieutenant Commander	1962	
Utah 3		Jason Chaffetz (R)	No; Defeated Chris Cannon (R) in a primary	Utah Valley Board of Trustees; Chief of staff to Governor Jon Huntsman Jr.	1967	
Virginia 2		Glenn Nye (D)	Yes; Defeated Thelma Drake (R)	USAID staff member U.S. Foreign Service officer	1974	
Virginia 5		Tom Perriello (D)	Yes; Defeated Virgil Goode (R)	Entrepreneur	1974	
Virginia 11		Gerry Connolly (D)	Yes; Open seat; replaced Tom Davis (R)	Fairfax County Board of Supervisors	1950	
Wyoming at-large		Cynthia Lummis (R)	No; Open seat; replaced Barbara Cubin (R)	Wyoming State Treasurer; Wyoming Senate; Wyoming House of Representatives	1954	

==== Non-voting delegates ====
District	Image	Delegate	Switched party	Prior background	Birth year	Ref
Northern Mariana Islands at-large		Gregorio Sablan (I)	New seat	Northern Mariana Islands House of Representatives; U.S. Army	1955	
Puerto Rico at-large		Pedro Pierluisi (NP/D)	No/Yes; Open seat; replaced Luis Fortuño (NP/R)	Secretary of Justice of Puerto Rico	1959	

=== Took office during the 111th Congress ===
District	Image	Representative	Took office	Switched party	Prior background	Birth year	Ref
Illinois 5		Mike Quigley (D)	April 21, 2009	No; Succeeded Rahm Emanuel (D)	Cook County Board of Commissioners	1958	
New York 20		Scott Murphy (D)	April 29, 2009	No; Succeeded Kirsten Gillibrand (D)	Entrepreneur	1970	
California 32		Judy Chu (D)	July 14, 2009	No; Succeeded Hilda Solis (D)	California State Board of Equalization; California State Assembly; Monterey Park City Council; Garvey School District	1953	
California 10		John Garamendi (D)	November 5, 2009	No; Succeeded Ellen Tauscher (D)	Lieutenant Governor of California; California Insurance Commissioner; U.S. Deputy Secretary of the Interior; California State Senate; California State Assembly	1945	
New York 23		Bill Owens (D)	November 6, 2009	Yes; Succeeded John M. McHugh (R)	Lawyer; U.S. Air Force Reserve Captain	1949	
Florida 19		Ted Deutch (D)	April 15, 2010	No; Succeeded Robert Wexler (D)	Florida Senate	1966	
Pennsylvania 12		Mark Critz (D)	May 20, 2010	No; Succeeded John Murtha (D)	Business manager	1962	
Hawaii 1		Charles Djou (R)	May 25, 2010	Yes; Succeeded Neil Abercrombie (D)	Honolulu City Council; Hawaii House of Representatives; Vice Chair of the Hawaii Republican Party; U.S. Army Reserve	1970	
Georgia 9		Tom Graves (R)	June 14, 2010	No; Succeeded Nathan Deal (R)	Georgia House of Representatives	1970	
Indiana 3		Marlin Stutzman (R)	November 2, 2010	No; Succeeded Mark Souder (D)	Indiana Senate; Indiana House of Representatives	1976	
New York 29		Tom Reed (R)	November 18, 2010	Yes; Succeeded Eric Massa (D)	Mayor of Corning	1971	

== See also ==
- List of United States representatives in the 111th Congress
- List of United States senators in the 111th Congress

== Notes ==
Preceded by New members of the 110th Congress	New members of the 111th Congress; 2009–2011	Succeeded by New members of the 112th Congress
