= Matt Simpson (New York politician) =

American politician

Member of the New York State Assembly from the 114th district
- Incumbent
- Assumed office January 6, 2021
- Preceded by: Dan Stec

Horicon Town Supervisor
- In office January 1, 2014 – December 31, 2020
- Preceded by: Ralph Bentley
- Succeeded by: Sylvia Smith

Personal details
- Born: August 4, 1967 (age 59)
- Party: Republican
- Spouse: Judy Simpson
- Children: 2
- Website: Campaign website Official website

Matt Simpson is an American politician. A Republican, he is currently serving in the New York State Assembly, representing the 114th district, which encompasses part of Essex and Warren counties, and portions of Saratoga and Washington counties. He assumed office on January 6, 2021.

== Early life, education, and career ==
Simpson grew up in Bolton, New York. His father was a teacher and his mother was a nurse at Glens Falls Hospital. He graduated from Hoosic Valley High School in 1985, and started his own dry wall company, working as a business owner for more than 30 years.

== Political career ==
Simpson served on the Horicon, New York Town Board for two years, before being elected as the town supervisor in an uncontested election. He also served as president of the Adirondack Association of Towns and Villages. In December 2019, Simpson announced his intentions to run for the 114th Assembly District upon the incumbent, Dan Stec, announcing his desire to represent the 45th district of the New York State Senate. Simpson was elected to the Assembly in 2020, defeating Democratic challenger Claudia Braymer and Serve America Movement candidate Evelyn Wood, earning 56.7% of the vote. Upon being elected to the Assembly, he retired from his town supervisor seat on December 31, 2020.
