= Ronald B. Stafford =

American lawyer and politician (1935–2005)

Member of the New York State Senate
- In office January 1, 1966 – December 31, 2002
- Preceded by: John E. Quinn (redistricting)
- Succeeded by: Betty Little
- Constituency: 48th district (1966); 42nd district (1967-1972); 43rd district (1973-1982); 45th district (1983-2002)

Personal details
- Born: June 29, 1935 Plattsburgh, New York, U.S.
- Died: June 24, 2005 (aged 69) Plattsburgh, New York, U.S.
- Party: Republican

Ronald B. Stafford (June 29, 1935 – June 24, 2005) was an American lawyer and politician from New York.

== Life ==
He was born on June 29, 1935, in Plattsburgh, New York, the son of Halsey W. Stafford and Agnes M. Stafford. His father was a correctional officer in Clinton State Prison. He graduated from Columbia Law School in 1962. He began the practice of law in the Plattsburgh office of Harris Beach and entered politics as a Republican.

Stafford was a member of the New York State Senate from 1966 to 2002, sitting in the 176th, 177th, 178th, 179th, 180th, 181st, 182nd, 183rd, 184th, 185th, 186th, 187th, 188th, 189th, 190th, 191st, 192nd, 193rd and 194th New York State Legislatures. In 1974, he was the driving force behind the bid of Lake Placid, New York, to host the 1980 Winter Olympics. He was Deputy Majority Leader from 1989 to 1992, and Chairman of the Committee on Finance from 1993 to 2002.

In 2000, he married Kay McCabe. After retiring from the Senate, he became President of CMA Consulting Services, of Latham, a company owned by his wife, which supplied red light cameras.

He died of lung cancer on June 24, 2005, at his home in Plattsburgh.

== Defense of state troopers' actions during Attica Prison Massacre ==
In 1973, Stafford attacked the efforts of state prosecutors to investigate the killing of 30 inmates and 9 correctional officers and employees by law enforcement shooters during the retaking of Attica Prison in September 1971. He claimed the impaneling of a second grand jury by prosecutors had followed "'years of intense pressure from radical groups and individuals'" to "'use our law enforcement personnel as scapegoats.'"

New York State Senate
Preceded by George R. Metcalf	New York State Senate; 48th District; 1966	Succeeded by William T. Smith
Preceded by D. Clinton Dominick III	New York State Senate; 42nd District; 1967–1972	Succeeded by Walter B. Langley
Preceded by Hugh Douglas Barclay	New York State Senate; 43rd District; 1973–1982	Succeeded by Joseph Bruno
Preceded by Hugh Douglas Barclay	New York State Senate; 45th District; 1983–2002	Succeeded by Betty Little
