= Betty Little =

American politician (born 1940)

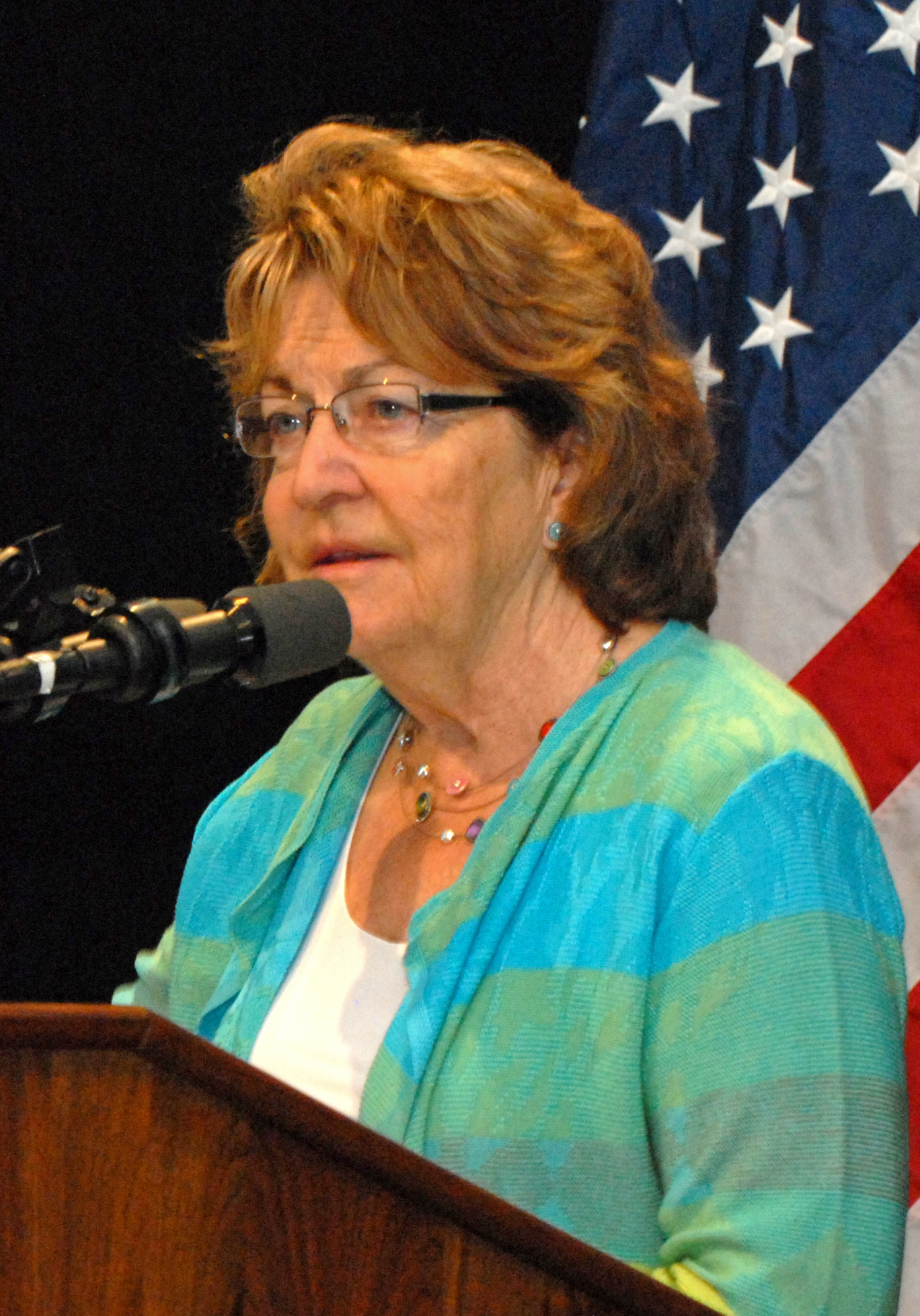

Member of the New York Senate from the 45th District
- In office January 1, 2003 – December 31, 2020
- Preceded by: Ronald B. Stafford
- Succeeded by: Dan Stec

Member of the New York Assembly from the 109th District
- In office November 8, 1995 – December 31, 2002
- Preceded by: James P. King
- Succeeded by: Robert Prentiss

Personal details
- Born: September 28, 1940 (age 86) Glens Falls, New York
- Party: Republican
- Education: College of St. Rose (B.A.)
- Website: Official website

Elizabeth O'Connor Little (born September 28, 1940) is a former New York State Senator. A member of the Republican Party, she was first elected in 2002. She served in the 45th Senate District, which includes all or part of Clinton, Essex, Franklin, Hamilton, Warren and Washington Counties.

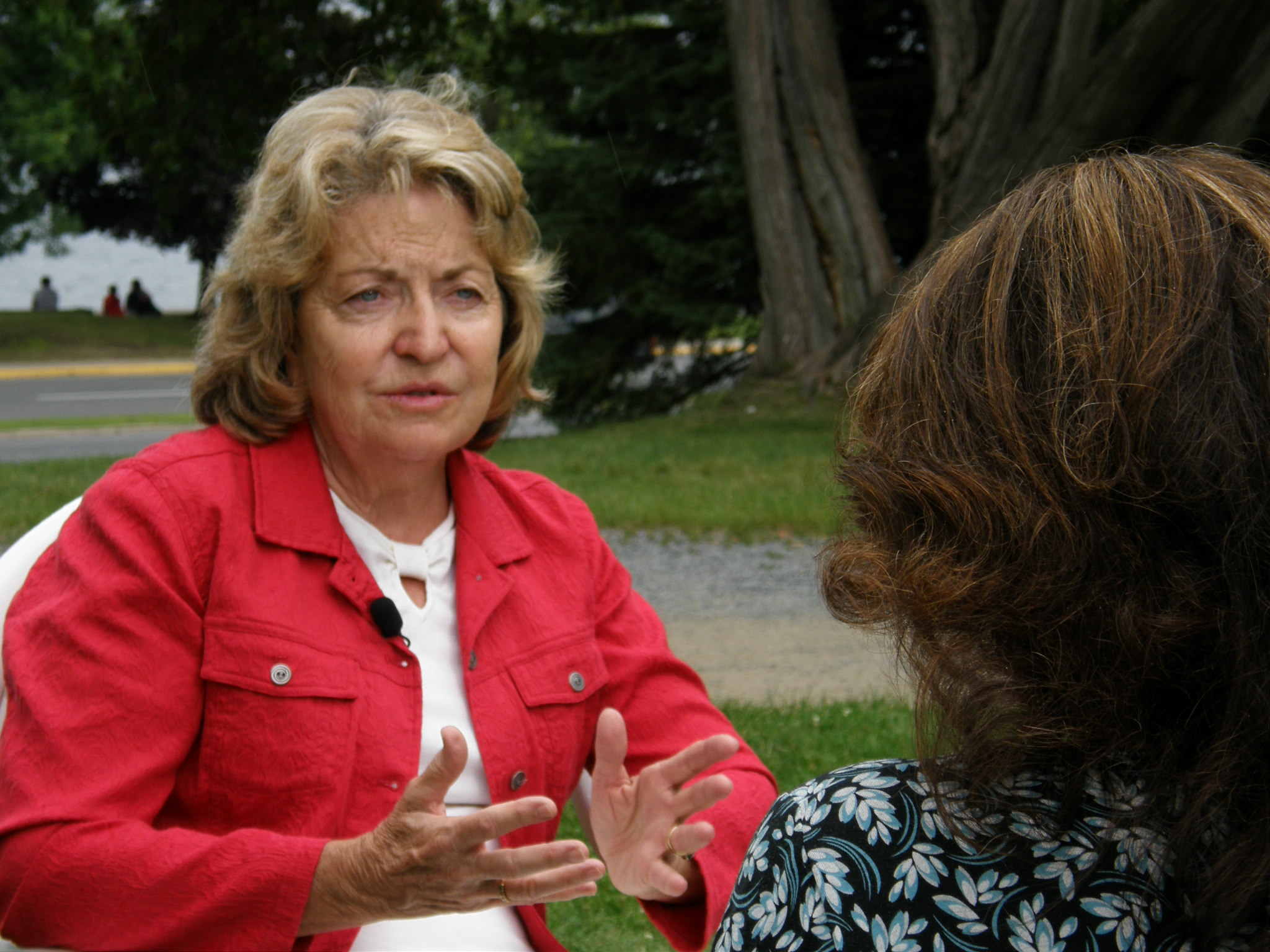
Betty Little during an interview

== Background ==
Little was born in Glens Falls on September 28, 1940. She graduated from the College of Saint Rose with an education degree. She has worked as both teacher and a realtor.

Little has six children and seventeen grandchildren. She is divorced.

== Political career ==
Little first entered public service as a member and later Chair of the Town of Queensbury Recreation Commission. In 1986 she was elected to serve as an At-Large Supervisor to the Warren County Board of Supervisors for the Town of Queensbury, where she served on numerous boards and committees and as County Budget Officer in 1990 and 1991.

In 1995, Little won a special election to serve in the New York State Assembly, and would serve in the Assembly until winning election to the Senate in 2002.

=== New York Senate ===
In 2002, incumbent Republican Senator Ronald B. Stafford decided not to seek another term. Little announced that she would run to replace him. Despite the district being competitive on paper, Little easily won election to her first term in the Senate against Democrat Boyce Sherwin, 77% to 23%.

Since her initial election, Little has never faced serious opposition. She was unopposed in 2004, 2008, 2010, 2012 and 2014. She faced the closest election of her career in 2018, but still won 64% to 36%.

After the appointment of Kirsten Gillibrand to the United States Senate in January 2009, Little expressed interest in running for U.S. Congress in New York's 20th congressional district and announced her intention to seek the Republican nomination for the special election for the seat. The nomination went instead to Assembly Minority Leader Jim Tedisco.

Before the Republicans lost the Senate majority in the 2018 elections, Little served as Chair of the Housing, Construction and Community Development Committee.

In December 2019, Little announced that she would not seek re-election the following year.

=== Political positions ===
==== Abortion ====
Little is pro-life. She voted against the Reproductive Health Act in 2018 in the Senate Health Committee.

==== Healthcare ====
Little has said she believes universal health care should be passed at the federal level to avoid unduly burdening the state.

==== Same-sex marriage ====
Little voted "No" on same-sex marriage legislation in December 2009 and the bill received no Republican Senate support. Little has said she supports civil unions. In 2011, Little voted against the Marriage Equality Act, which the Senate passed 33-29. The 2011 bill became law.

New York State Assembly
Preceded by James P. King	New York State Assembly, 109th district 1995–2002	Succeeded by Robert Prentiss
New York State Senate
Preceded by Ronald B. Stafford	New York State Senate, 45th district 2003–2020	Succeeded by Dan Stec
