= List of United States representatives in the 111th Congress =

This is a complete list of United States representatives during the 111th United States Congress (January 3, 2009 – January 3, 2011) in order of seniority. For the most part, representatives are ranked by the beginning of their terms in office. Representatives whose terms begin the same day are ranked by seniority.

Note: The "*" indicates that the representative/delegate may have served one or more non-consecutive terms while in the House of Representatives of the United States Congress.

== U.S. House seniority list ==
U.S. House seniority
Rank	Representative	Party	District	Seniority date (Previous service, if any)	Term #	Notes
1	John Dingell	D	MI-15	December 13, 1955	28th term	Dean of the House
2	John Conyers	D	MI-14	January 3, 1965	23rd term	Chair of the Judiciary Committee; Dean of the Congressional Black Caucus
3	Dave Obey	D	WI-07	April 1, 1969	21st term	Chair of the Appropriations Committee; Left the House in 2011.
4	Charles Rangel	D	NY-15	January 3, 1971	20th term	Chair of the Ways and Means Committee
5	Bill Young	R	FL-10	January 3, 1971	20th term	
6	Pete Stark	D	CA-13	January 3, 1973	19th term	
7	Don Young	R	AK-AL	March 6, 1973	19th term	
8	John Murtha	D	PA-12	February 5, 1974	19th term	Died on February 8, 2010
9	George Miller	D	CA-07	January 3, 1975	18th term	Chair of the Education and Labor Committee
10	Jim Oberstar	D	MN-08	January 3, 1975	18th term	Chair of the Transportation and Infrastructure Committee; Left the House in 2011.
11	Henry Waxman	D	CA-30	January 3, 1975	18th term	Chair of the Energy and Commerce Committee
12	Ed Markey	D	MA-07	November 2, 1976	18th term	Chair of the Select Committee on Energy Independence and Global Warming
13	Norm Dicks	D	WA-06	January 3, 1977	17th term	
14	Dale Kildee	D	MI-05	January 3, 1977	17th term	
15	Nick Rahall	D	WV-03	January 3, 1977	17th term	Chair of the Natural Resources Committee
16	Ike Skelton	D	MO-04	January 3, 1977	17th term	Chair of the Armed Services Committee; Left the House in 2011.
17	Jerry Lewis	R	CA-41	January 3, 1979	16th term	Ranking member of the Appropriations Committee
18	Jim Sensenbrenner	R	WI-05	January 3, 1979	16th term	Ranking member of the Select Committee on Energy Independence and Global Warming
19	Tom Petri	R	WI-06	April 3, 1979	16th term	
20	David Dreier	R	CA-26	January 3, 1981	15th term	Ranking member of the Rules Committee
21	Barney Frank	D	MA-04	January 3, 1981	15th term	Chair of the Financial Services Committee
22	Ralph Hall	R	TX-04	January 3, 1981	15th term	Ranking member of the Science and Technology Committee
23	Hal Rogers	R	KY-05	January 3, 1981	15th term	
24	Chris Smith	R	NJ-04	January 3, 1981	15th term	
25	Frank Wolf	R	VA-10	January 3, 1981	15th term	
26	Steny Hoyer	D	MD-05	May 19, 1981	15th term	Majority Leader
27	Howard Berman	D	CA-28	January 3, 1983	14th term	Chair of the Foreign Affairs Committee
28	Rick Boucher	D	VA-09	January 3, 1983	14th term	Left the House in 2011.
29	Dan Burton	R	IN-05	January 3, 1983	14th term	
30	Marcy Kaptur	D	OH-09	January 3, 1983	14th term	Most senior woman in the U.S. House of Representatives.
31	Sander Levin	D	MI-12	January 3, 1983	14th term	
32	Alan Mollohan	D	WV-01	January 3, 1983	14th term	Left the House in 2011.
33	Solomon P. Ortiz	D	TX-27	January 3, 1983	14th term	Dean of the Congressional Hispanic Caucus; Left the House in 2011.
34	John Spratt	D	SC-05	January 3, 1983	14th term	Chair of the Budget Committee; Left the House in 2011.
35	Edolphus Towns	D	NY-10	January 3, 1983	14th term	Chair of the Oversight and Government Reform Committee
36	Gary Ackerman	D	NY-05	March 1, 1983	14th term	
37	Joe Barton	R	TX-06	January 3, 1985	13th term	Ranking member of the Energy and Commerce Committee
38	Howard Coble	R	NC-06	January 3, 1985	13th term	
39	Bart Gordon	D	TN-06	January 3, 1985	13th term	Chair of the Science and Technology Committee; Left the House in 2011.
40	Paul Kanjorski	D	PA-11	January 3, 1985	13th term	Left the House in 2011.
41	Pete Visclosky	D	IN-01	January 3, 1985	13th term	
42	Peter DeFazio	D	OR-04	January 3, 1987	12th term	
43	Elton Gallegly	R	CA-24	January 3, 1987	12th term	
44	Wally Herger	R	CA-02	January 3, 1987	12th term	
45	John Lewis	D	GA-05	January 3, 1987	12th term	
46	Louise Slaughter	D	NY-28	January 3, 1987	12th term	Chair of the Rules Committee
47	Lamar Smith	R	TX-21	January 3, 1987	12th term	Ranking member of the Judiciary Committee
48	Fred Upton	R	MI-06	January 3, 1987	12th term	
49	Nancy Pelosi	D	CA-08	June 2, 1987	12th term	Speaker of the House
50	Jerry Costello	D	IL-12	August 9, 1988	12th term	
51	Frank Pallone	D	NJ-06	November 8, 1988	12th term	
52	Jimmy Duncan	R	TN-02	November 8, 1988	12th term	
53	Eliot Engel	D	NY-17	January 3, 1989	11th term	
54	Nita Lowey	D	NY-18	January 3, 1989	11th term	
55	Jim McDermott	D	WA-07	January 3, 1989	11th term	
56	Richard Neal	D	MA-02	January 3, 1989	11th term	
57	Donald M. Payne	D	NJ-10	January 3, 1989	11th term	
58	Dana Rohrabacher	R	CA-46	January 3, 1989	11th term	
59	Cliff Stearns	R	FL-06	January 3, 1989	11th term	
60	John S. Tanner	D	TN-08	January 3, 1989	11th term	Left the House in 2011.
61	Ileana Ros-Lehtinen	R	FL-18	August 29, 1989	11th term	Ranking member of the Foreign Affairs Committee; Most senior Republican woman in the U.S. House of Representatives.
62	Gene Taylor	D	MS-04	October 17, 1989	11th term	Left the House in 2011.
63	José E. Serrano	D	NY-16	March 20, 1990	11th term	
64	Rob Andrews	D	NJ-01	November 6, 1990	11th term	
65	Neil Abercrombie	D	HI-01	January 3, 1991; Previous service, 1986–1987.	11th term*	Resigned on February 28, 2010
66	John Boehner	R	OH-08	January 3, 1991	10th term	Minority Leader
67	Dave Camp	R	MI-04	January 3, 1991	10th term	Ranking member of the Ways and Means Committee
68	Rosa DeLauro	D	CT-03	January 3, 1991	10th term	
69	Chet Edwards	D	TX-17	January 3, 1991	10th term	Left the House in 2011.
70	Jim Moran	D	VA-08	January 3, 1991	10th term	
71	Collin Peterson	D	MN-07	January 3, 1991	10th term	Chair of the Agriculture Committee
72	Maxine Waters	D	CA-35	January 3, 1991	10th term	
73	Sam Johnson	R	TX-03	May 8, 1991	10th term	
74	John Olver	D	MA-01	June 4, 1991	10th term	
75	Ed Pastor	D	AZ-04	October 3, 1991	10th term	
76	Jerry Nadler	D	NY-08	November 3, 1992	10th term	
77	Spencer Bachus	R	AL-06	January 3, 1993	9th term	Ranking member of the Financial Services Committee
78	Roscoe Bartlett	R	MD-06	January 3, 1993	9th term	
79	Xavier Becerra	D	CA-31	January 3, 1993	9th term	
80	Sanford Bishop	D	GA-02	January 3, 1993	9th term	
81	Corrine Brown	D	FL-03	January 3, 1993	9th term	
82	Steve Buyer	R	IN-04	January 3, 1993	9th term	Ranking member of the Veterans' Affairs Committee; Left the House in 2011.
83	Ken Calvert	R	CA-44	January 3, 1993	9th term	
84	Mike Castle	R	DE-AL	January 3, 1993	9th term	Left the House in 2011.
85	Jim Clyburn	D	SC-06	January 3, 1993	9th term	Majority Whip
86	Nathan Deal	R	GA-09	January 3, 1993	9th term	Resigned on March 21, 2010
87	Lincoln Díaz-Balart	R	FL-21	January 3, 1993	9th term	Left the House in 2011.
88	Anna Eshoo	D	CA-14	January 3, 1993	9th term	
89	Bob Filner	D	CA-51	January 3, 1993	9th term	Chair of the Veterans' Affairs Committee
90	Bob Goodlatte	R	VA-06	January 3, 1993	9th term	Ranking member of the Agriculture Committee
91	Gene Green	D	TX-29	January 3, 1993	9th term	
92	Luis Gutiérrez	D	IL-04	January 3, 1993	9th term	
93	Alcee Hastings	D	FL-23	January 3, 1993	9th term	
94	Maurice Hinchey	D	NY-22	January 3, 1993	9th term	
95	Pete Hoekstra	R	MI-02	January 3, 1993	9th term	Ranking member of the Intelligence Committee; Left the House in 2011.
96	Tim Holden	D	PA-17	January 3, 1993	9th term	
97	Eddie Bernice Johnson	D	TX-30	January 3, 1993	9th term	
98	Peter T. King	R	NY-03	January 3, 1993	9th term	Ranking member of the Homeland Security Committee
99	Jack Kingston	R	GA-01	January 3, 1993	9th term	
100	John Linder	R	GA-07	January 3, 1993	9th term	Left the House in 2011.
101	Buck McKeon	R	CA-25	January 3, 1993	9th term	Ranking member: Armed Services; Ranking member of the Education and Labor Committee before the resignation of John McHugh
102	Carolyn Maloney	D	NY-14	January 3, 1993	9th term	
103	Don Manzullo	R	IL-16	January 3, 1993	9th term	
104	John M. McHugh	R	NY-23	January 3, 1993	9th term	Ranking member: Armed Services; Resigned on September 21, 2009
105	John Mica	R	FL-07	January 3, 1993	9th term	Ranking member of the Transportation and Infrastructure Committee
106	Earl Pomeroy	D	ND-AL	January 3, 1993	9th term	Left the House in 2011.
107	Lucille Roybal-Allard	D	CA-34	January 3, 1993	9th term	
108	Ed Royce	R	CA-40	January 3, 1993	9th term	
109	Bobby Rush	D	IL-01	January 3, 1993	9th term	
110	Bobby Scott	D	VA-03	January 3, 1993	9th term	
111	Bart Stupak	D	MI-01	January 3, 1993	9th term	Left the House in 2011.
112	Nydia Velázquez	D	NY-12	January 3, 1993	9th term	Chair of the Small Business Committee
113	Mel Watt	D	NC-12	January 3, 1993	9th term	
114	Lynn Woolsey	D	CA-06	January 3, 1993	9th term	
115	Bennie Thompson	D	MS-02	April 13, 1993	9th term	Chair of the Homeland Security Committee
116	Sam Farr	D	CA-17	June 8, 1993	9th term	
117	Vern Ehlers	R	MI-03	December 7, 1993	9th term	Left the House in 2011.
118	Frank Lucas	R	OK-03	May 10, 1994	9th term	
119	Lloyd Doggett	D	TX-25	January 3, 1995	8th term	
120	Mike Doyle	D	PA-14	January 3, 1995	8th term	
121	Chaka Fattah	D	PA-02	January 3, 1995	8th term	
122	Rodney Frelinghuysen	R	NJ-11	January 3, 1995	8th term	
123	Doc Hastings	R	WA-04	January 3, 1995	8th term	Ranking member of the Natural Resources Committee
124	Sheila Jackson Lee	D	TX-18	January 3, 1995	8th term	
125	Walter B. Jones Jr.	R	NC-03	January 3, 1995	8th term	
126	Patrick J. Kennedy	D	RI-01	January 3, 1995	8th term	Left the House in 2011.
127	Tom Latham	R	IA-04	January 3, 1995	8th term	
128	Steve LaTourette	R	OH-14	January 3, 1995	8th term	
129	Frank LoBiondo	R	NJ-02	January 3, 1995	8th term	
130	Zoe Lofgren	D	CA-16	January 3, 1995	8th term	
131	Sue Myrick	R	NC-09	January 3, 1995	8th term	
132	George Radanovich	R	CA-19	January 3, 1995	8th term	Left the House in 2011.
133	John Shadegg	R	AZ-03	January 3, 1995	8th term	Left the House in 2011.
134	Mark Souder	R	IN-03	January 3, 1995	8th term	Resigned on May 21, 2010
135	Mac Thornberry	R	TX-13	January 3, 1995	8th term	
136	Todd Tiahrt	R	KS-04	January 3, 1995	8th term	Left the House in 2011.
137	Zach Wamp	R	TN-03	January 3, 1995	8th term	Left the House in 2011.
138	Ed Whitfield	R	KY-01	January 3, 1995	8th term	
139	Jesse Jackson Jr.	D	IL-02	December 12, 1995	8th term	
140	Elijah Cummings	D	MD-07	April 16, 1996	8th term	
141	Earl Blumenauer	D	OR-03	May 21, 1996	8th term	
142	Jo Ann Emerson	R	MO-08	November 5, 1996	8th term	
143	Ron Paul	R	TX-14	January 3, 1997; Previous service, 1976–1977 and 1979–1985.	11th term**	
144	David Price	D	NC-04	January 3, 1997; Previous service, 1987–1995.	11th term*	
145	Robert Aderholt	R	AL-04	January 3, 1997	7th term	
146	Marion Berry	D	AR-01	January 3, 1997	7th term	
147	Roy Blunt	R	MO-07	January 3, 1997	7th term	Left the House in 2011.
148	Leonard Boswell	D	IA-03	January 3, 1997	7th term	
149	Allen Boyd	D	FL-02	January 3, 1997	7th term	Left the House in 2011.
150	Kevin Brady	R	TX-08	January 3, 1997	7th term	
151	Danny K. Davis	D	IL-07	January 3, 1997	7th term	
152	Diana DeGette	D	CO-01	January 3, 1997	7th term	
153	Bill Delahunt	D	MA-10	January 3, 1997	7th term	Left the House in 2011.
154	Bob Etheridge	D	NC-02	January 3, 1997	7th term	Left the House in 2011.
155	Kay Granger	R	TX-12	January 3, 1997	7th term	
156	Rubén Hinojosa	D	TX-15	January 3, 1997	7th term	
157	Carolyn Cheeks Kilpatrick	D	MI-13	January 3, 1997	7th term	Left the House in 2011.
158	Ron Kind	D	WI-03	January 3, 1997	7th term	
159	Dennis Kucinich	D	OH-10	January 3, 1997	7th term	
160	Carolyn McCarthy	D	NY-04	January 3, 1997	7th term	
161	Jim McGovern	D	MA-03	January 3, 1997	7th term	
162	Mike McIntyre	D	NC-07	January 3, 1997	7th term	
163	Jerry Moran	R	KS-01	January 3, 1997	7th term	Left the House in 2011.
164	Bill Pascrell	D	NJ-08	January 3, 1997	7th term	
165	Joe Pitts	R	PA-16	January 3, 1997	7th term	
166	Silvestre Reyes	D	TX-16	January 3, 1997	7th term	Chair of the Intelligence Committee
167	Steve Rothman	D	NJ-09	January 3, 1997	7th term	
168	Loretta Sanchez	D	CA-47	January 3, 1997	7th term	
169	Pete Sessions	R	TX-32	January 3, 1997	7th term	
170	Brad Sherman	D	CA-27	January 3, 1997	7th term	
171	John Shimkus	R	IL-19	January 3, 1997	7th term	
172	Adam Smith	D	WA-09	January 3, 1997	7th term	
173	Vic Snyder	D	AR-02	January 3, 1997	7th term	Left the House in 2011.
174	Ellen Tauscher	D	CA-10	January 3, 1997	7th term	Resigned on June 26, 2009
175	John F. Tierney	D	MA-06	January 3, 1997	7th term	
176	Robert Wexler	D	FL-19	January 3, 1997	7th term	Resigned on January 3, 2010
177	Gregory Meeks	D	NY-06	February 3, 1998	7th term	
178	Lois Capps	D	CA-23	March 10, 1998	7th term	
179	Mary Bono Mack	R	CA-45	April 7, 1998	7th term	
180	Barbara Lee	D	CA-09	April 7, 1998	7th term	
181	Bob Brady	D	PA-01	May 19, 1998	7th term	Chair of the House Administration Committee
182	Jay Inslee	D	WA-01	January 3, 1999; Previous service, 1993–1995.	7th term*	
183	Brian Baird	D	WA-03	January 3, 1999	6th term	Left the House in 2011.
184	Tammy Baldwin	D	WI-02	January 3, 1999	6th term	
185	Shelley Berkley	D	NV-01	January 3, 1999	6th term	
186	Judy Biggert	R	IL-13	January 3, 1999	6th term	
187	Mike Capuano	D	MA-08	January 3, 1999	6th term	
188	Joe Crowley	D	NY-07	January 3, 1999	6th term	
189	Charlie Gonzalez	D	TX-20	January 3, 1999	6th term	
190	Rush Holt Jr.	D	NJ-12	January 3, 1999	6th term	
191	John B. Larson	D	CT-01	January 3, 1999	6th term	Democratic Caucus Chairman
192	Gary Miller	R	CA-42	January 3, 1999	6th term	
193	Dennis Moore	D	KS-03	January 3, 1999	6th term	Left the House in 2011.
194	Grace Napolitano	D	CA-38	January 3, 1999	6th term	
195	Paul Ryan	R	WI-01	January 3, 1999	6th term	Ranking member of the Budget Committee
196	Jan Schakowsky	D	IL-09	January 3, 1999	6th term	
197	Mike Simpson	R	ID-02	January 3, 1999	6th term	
198	Lee Terry	R	NE-02	January 3, 1999	6th term	
199	Mike Thompson	D	CA-01	January 3, 1999	6th term	
200	Greg Walden	R	OR-02	January 3, 1999	6th term	
201	Anthony Weiner	D	NY-09	January 3, 1999	6th term	
202	David Wu	D	OR-01	January 3, 1999	6th term	
203	Joe Baca	D	CA-43	November 16, 1999	6th term	
204	Jane Harman	D	CA-36	January 3, 2001; Previous service, 1993–1999.	8th term*	
205	Todd Akin	R	MO-02	January 3, 2001	5th term	
206	Henry E. Brown Jr.	R	SC-01	January 3, 2001	5th term	Left the House in 2011.
207	Eric Cantor	R	VA-07	January 3, 2001	5th term	Minority Whip
208	Shelley Moore Capito	R	WV-02	January 3, 2001	5th term	
209	Lacy Clay	D	MO-01	January 3, 2001	5th term	
210	Ander Crenshaw	R	FL-04	January 3, 2001	5th term	
211	John Culberson	R	TX-07	January 3, 2001	5th term	
212	Susan Davis	D	CA-53	January 3, 2001	5th term	
213	Jeff Flake	R	AZ-06	January 3, 2001	5th term	
214	Sam Graves	R	MO-06	January 3, 2001	5th term	Ranking member of the Small Business Committee
215	Mike Honda	D	CA-15	January 3, 2001	5th term	
216	Steve Israel	D	NY-02	January 3, 2001	5th term	
217	Darrell Issa	R	CA-49	January 3, 2001	5th term	Ranking member of the Oversight and Government Reform Committee
218	Tim Johnson	R	IL-15	January 3, 2001	5th term	
219	Mark Kirk	R	IL-10	January 3, 2001	5th term	Resigned on November 29, 2010
220	James Langevin	D	RI-02	January 3, 2001	5th term	
221	Rick Larsen	D	WA-02	January 3, 2001	5th term	
222	Betty McCollum	D	MN-04	January 3, 2001	5th term	
223	Jim Matheson	D	UT-02	January 3, 2001	5th term	
224	Mike Pence	R	IN-06	January 3, 2001	5th term	
225	Todd Platts	R	PA-19	January 3, 2001	5th term	
226	Adam Putnam	R	FL-12	January 3, 2001	5th term	Left the House in 2011.
227	Denny Rehberg	R	MT-AL	January 3, 2001	5th term	
228	Mike Rogers	R	MI-08	January 3, 2001	5th term	
229	Mike Ross	D	AR-04	January 3, 2001	5th term	
230	Adam Schiff	D	CA-29	January 3, 2001	5th term	
231	Hilda Solis	D	CA-32	January 3, 2001	5th term	Resigned on February 24, 2009
232	Pat Tiberi	R	OH-12	January 3, 2001	5th term	
233	Bill Shuster	R	PA-09	May 15, 2001	5th term	
234	Diane Watson	D	CA-33	June 5, 2001	5th term	Left the House in 2011.
235	Randy Forbes	R	VA-04	June 19, 2001	5th term	
236	Stephen Lynch	D	MA-09	October 16, 2001	5th term	
237	Jeff Miller	R	FL-01	October 16, 2001	5th term	
238	John Boozman	R	AR-03	November 20, 2001	5th term	Left the House in 2011.
239	Joe Wilson	R	SC-02	December 18, 2001	5th term	
240	John Sullivan	R	OK-01	February 15, 2002	5th term	
241	Jim Cooper	D	TN-05	January 3, 2003; Previous service, 1983–1995.	10th term*	
242	Rodney Alexander	R	LA-05	January 3, 2003	4th term	
243	Gresham Barrett	R	SC-03	January 3, 2003	4th term	Left the House in 2011.
244	Rob Bishop	R	UT-01	January 3, 2003	4th term	
245	Tim Bishop	D	NY-01	January 3, 2003	4th term	
246	Marsha Blackburn	R	TN-07	January 3, 2003	4th term	
247	Jo Bonner	R	AL-01	January 3, 2003	4th term	
248	Ginny Brown-Waite	R	FL-05	January 3, 2003	4th term	Left the House in 2011.
249	Michael C. Burgess	R	TX-26	January 3, 2003	4th term	
250	Dennis Cardoza	D	CA-18	January 3, 2003	4th term	
251	John Carter	R	TX-31	January 3, 2003	4th term	
252	Tom Cole	R	OK-04	January 3, 2003	4th term	
253	Artur Davis	D	AL-07	January 3, 2003	4th term	Left the House in 2011.
254	Lincoln Davis	D	TN-04	January 3, 2003	4th term	Left the House in 2011.
255	Mario Díaz-Balart	R	FL-25	January 3, 2003	4th term	Left the House in 2011.
256	Trent Franks	R	AZ-02	January 3, 2003	4th term	
257	Scott Garrett	R	NJ-05	January 3, 2003	4th term	
258	Jim Gerlach	R	PA-06	January 3, 2003	4th term	
259	Phil Gingrey	R	GA-11	January 3, 2003	4th term	
260	Raúl Grijalva	D	AZ-07	January 3, 2003	4th term	
261	Jeb Hensarling	R	TX-05	January 3, 2003	4th term	
262	Steve King	R	IA-05	January 3, 2003	4th term	
263	John Kline	R	MN-02	January 3, 2003	4th term	Ranking member of the Education and Labor Committee
264	Jim Marshall	D	GA-08	January 3, 2003	4th term	Left the House in 2011.
265	Thaddeus McCotter	R	MI-11	January 3, 2003	4th term	
266	Kendrick Meek	D	FL-17	January 3, 2003	4th term	Left the House in 2011.
267	Mike Michaud	D	ME-02	January 3, 2003	4th term	
268	Brad Miller	D	NC-13	January 3, 2003	4th term	
269	Candice Miller	R	MI-10	January 3, 2003	4th term	
270	Tim Murphy	R	PA-18	January 3, 2003	4th term	
271	Devin Nunes	R	CA-21	January 3, 2003	4th term	
272	Mike Rogers	R	AL-03	January 3, 2003	4th term	
273	Dutch Ruppersberger	D	MD-02	January 3, 2003	4th term	
274	Tim Ryan	D	OH-17	January 3, 2003	4th term	
275	Linda Sánchez	D	CA-39	January 3, 2003	4th term	
276	David Scott	D	GA-13	January 3, 2003	4th term	
277	Mike Turner	R	OH-03	January 3, 2003	4th term	
278	Chris Van Hollen	D	MD-08	January 3, 2003	4th term	
279	Randy Neugebauer	R	TX-19	June 3, 2003	4th term	
280	Ben Chandler	D	KY-06	February 17, 2004	4th term	
281	Stephanie Herseth Sandlin	D	SD-AL	June 1, 2004	4th term	Left the House in 2011.
282	G. K. Butterfield	D	NC-01	July 20, 2004	4th term	
283	Bob Inglis	R	SC-04	January 3, 2005; Previous service, 1993–1999.	6th term*	Left the House in 2011.
284	Dan Lungren	R	CA-03	January 3, 2005; Previous service, 1979–1989.	8th term*	Ranking member of the House Administration Committee
285	John Barrow	D	GA-12	January 3, 2005	3rd term	
286	Melissa Bean	D	IL-08	January 3, 2005	3rd term	Left the House in 2011.
287	Dan Boren	D	OK-02	January 3, 2005	3rd term	
288	Charles Boustany	R	LA-07	January 3, 2005	3rd term	
289	Russ Carnahan	D	MO-03	January 3, 2005	3rd term	
290	Emanuel Cleaver	D	MO-05	January 3, 2005	3rd term	
291	Mike Conaway	R	TX-11	January 3, 2005	3rd term	
292	Jim Costa	D	CA-20	January 3, 2005	3rd term	
293	Henry Cuellar	D	TX-28	January 3, 2005	3rd term	
294	Geoff Davis	R	KY-04	January 3, 2005	3rd term	
295	Charlie Dent	R	PA-15	January 3, 2005	3rd term	
296	Jeff Fortenberry	R	NE-01	January 3, 2005	3rd term	
297	Virginia Foxx	R	NC-05	January 3, 2005	3rd term	
298	Louie Gohmert	R	TX-01	January 3, 2005	3rd term	
299	Al Green	D	TX-09	January 3, 2005	3rd term	
300	Brian Higgins	D	NY-27	January 3, 2005	3rd term	
301	Dan Lipinski	D	IL-03	January 3, 2005	3rd term	
302	Michael McCaul	R	TX-10	January 3, 2005	3rd term	
303	Patrick McHenry	R	NC-10	January 3, 2005	3rd term	
304	Cathy McMorris Rodgers	R	WA-05	January 3, 2005	3rd term	
305	Connie Mack IV	R	FL-14	January 3, 2005	3rd term	
306	Kenny Marchant	R	TX-24	January 3, 2005	3rd term	
307	Charlie Melançon	D	LA-03	January 3, 2005	3rd term	Left the House in 2011.
308	Gwen Moore	D	WI-04	January 3, 2005	3rd term	
309	Ted Poe	R	TX-02	January 3, 2005	3rd term	
310	Tom Price	R	GA-06	January 3, 2005	3rd term	
311	Dave Reichert	R	WA-08	January 3, 2005	3rd term	
312	John Salazar	D	CO-03	January 3, 2005	3rd term	Left the House in 2011.
313	Allyson Schwartz	D	PA-13	January 3, 2005	3rd term	
314	Debbie Wasserman Schultz	D	FL-20	January 3, 2005	3rd term	
315	Lynn Westmoreland	R	GA-03	January 3, 2005	3rd term	
316	Doris Matsui	D	CA-05	March 8, 2005	3rd term	
317	Jean Schmidt	R	OH-02	August 2, 2005	3rd term	
318	John Campbell	R	CA-48	December 6, 2005	3rd term	
319	Brian Bilbray	R	CA-50	June 6, 2006; Previous service, 1995–2001.	6th term*	
320	Albio Sires	D	NJ-13	November 13, 2006	3rd term	
321	Baron Hill	D	IN-09	January 3, 2007; Previous service, 1999–2005.	5th term*	Left the House in 2011.
322	Ciro Rodriguez	D	TX-23	January 3, 2007; Previous service, 1997–2005.	6th term*	Left the House in 2011.
323	Jason Altmire	D	PA-04	January 3, 2007	2nd term	
324	Mike Arcuri	D	NY-24	January 3, 2007	2nd term	Left the House in 2011.
325	Michele Bachmann	R	MN-06	January 3, 2007	2nd term	
326	Gus Bilirakis	R	FL-09	January 3, 2007	2nd term	
327	Bruce Braley	D	IA-01	January 3, 2007	2nd term	
328	Vern Buchanan	R	FL-13	January 3, 2007	2nd term	
329	Chris Carney	D	PA-10	January 3, 2007	2nd term	Left the House in 2011.
330	Kathy Castor	D	FL-11	January 3, 2007	2nd term	
331	Yvette Clarke	D	NY-11	January 3, 2007	2nd term	
332	Steve Cohen	D	TN-09	January 3, 2007	2nd term	
333	Joe Courtney	D	CT-02	January 3, 2007	2nd term	
334	Joe Donnelly	D	IN-02	January 3, 2007	2nd term	
335	Keith Ellison	D	MN-05	January 3, 2007	2nd term	
336	Brad Ellsworth	D	IN-08	January 3, 2007	2nd term	Left the House in 2011.
337	Mary Fallin	R	OK-05	January 3, 2007	2nd term	Left the House in 2011.
338	Gabby Giffords	D	AZ-08	January 3, 2007	2nd term	
339	Kirsten Gillibrand	D	NY-20	January 3, 2007	2nd term	Resigned on January 26, 2009
340	John Hall	D	NY-19	January 3, 2007	2nd term	Left the House in 2011.
341	Phil Hare	D	IL-17	January 3, 2007	2nd term	Left the House in 2011.
342	Dean Heller	R	NV-02	January 3, 2007	2nd term	
343	Mazie Hirono	D	HI-02	January 3, 2007	2nd term	
344	Paul Hodes	D	NH-02	January 3, 2007	2nd term	Left the House in 2011.
345	Hank Johnson	D	GA-04	January 3, 2007	2nd term	
346	Jim Jordan	R	OH-04	January 3, 2007	2nd term	
347	Steve Kagen	D	WI-08	January 3, 2007	2nd term	Left the House in 2011.
348	Ron Klein	D	FL-22	January 3, 2007	2nd term	Left the House in 2011.
349	Doug Lamborn	R	CO-05	January 3, 2007	2nd term	
350	Dave Loebsack	D	IA-02	January 3, 2007	2nd term	
351	Kevin McCarthy	R	CA-22	January 3, 2007	2nd term	
352	Jerry McNerney	D	CA-11	January 3, 2007	2nd term	
353	Harry Mitchell	D	AZ-05	January 3, 2007	2nd term	Left the House in 2011.
354	Chris Murphy	D	CT-05	January 3, 2007	2nd term	
355	Patrick Murphy	D	PA-08	January 3, 2007	2nd term	Left the House in 2011.
356	Ed Perlmutter	D	CO-07	January 3, 2007	2nd term	
357	Peter Roskam	R	IL-06	January 3, 2007	2nd term	
358	John Sarbanes	D	MD-03	January 3, 2007	2nd term	
359	Joe Sestak	D	PA-07	January 3, 2007	2nd term	Left the House in 2011.
360	Carol Shea-Porter	D	NH-01	January 3, 2007	2nd term	Left the House in 2011.
361	Heath Shuler	D	NC-11	January 3, 2007	2nd term	
362	Adrian Smith	R	NE-03	January 3, 2007	2nd term	
363	Zack Space	D	OH-18	January 3, 2007	2nd term	Left the House in 2011.
364	Betty Sutton	D	OH-13	January 3, 2007	2nd term	
365	Tim Walz	D	MN-01	January 3, 2007	2nd term	
366	Peter Welch	D	VT-AL	January 3, 2007	2nd term	
367	Charlie Wilson	D	OH-06	January 3, 2007	2nd term	Left the House in 2011.
368	John Yarmuth	D	KY-03	January 3, 2007	2nd term	
369	Paul Broun	R	GA-10	July 17, 2007	2nd term	
370	Laura Richardson	D	CA-37	August 21, 2007	2nd term	
371	Niki Tsongas	D	MA-05	October 16, 2007	2nd term	
372	Bob Latta	R	OH-05	December 11, 2007	2nd term	
373	Rob Wittman	R	VA-01	December 11, 2007	2nd term	
374	Bill Foster	D	IL-14	March 8, 2008	2nd term	Left the House in 2011.
375	André Carson	D	IN-07	March 11, 2008	2nd term	
376	Jackie Speier	D	CA-12	April 8, 2008	2nd term	
377	Steve Scalise	R	LA-01	May 3, 2008	2nd term	
378	Travis Childers	D	MS-01	May 13, 2008	2nd term	Left the House in 2011.
379	Donna Edwards	D	MD-04	June 17, 2008	2nd term	
380	Marcia Fudge	D	OH-11	November 18, 2008	2nd term	
381	John Adler	D	NJ-03	January 3, 2009	1st term	Left the House in 2011.
382	Steve Austria	R	OH-07	January 3, 2009	1st term	
383	John Boccieri	D	OH-16	January 3, 2009	1st term	Left the House in 2011.
384	Bobby Bright	D	AL-02	January 3, 2009	1st term	Left the House in 2011.
385	Joseph Cao	R	LA-02	January 3, 2009	1st term	Left the House in 2011.
386	Bill Cassidy	R	LA-06	January 3, 2009	1st term	
387	Jason Chaffetz	R	UT-03	January 3, 2009	1st term	
388	Mike Coffman	R	CO-06	January 3, 2009	1st term	
389	Gerry Connolly	D	VA-11	January 3, 2009	1st term	
390	Kathy Dahlkemper	D	PA-03	January 3, 2009	1st term	Left the House in 2011.
391	Steve Driehaus	D	OH-01	January 3, 2009	1st term	Left the House in 2011.
392	John Fleming	R	LA-04	January 3, 2009	1st term	
393	Alan Grayson	D	FL-08	January 3, 2009	1st term	
394	Parker Griffith	D	AL-05	January 3, 2009	1st term	Switched to Republican on December 22, 2009. Left the House in 2011.
395	Brett Guthrie	R	KY-02	January 3, 2009	1st term	
396	Debbie Halvorson	D	IL-11	January 3, 2009	1st term	Left the House in 2011.
397	Gregg Harper	R	MS-03	January 3, 2009	1st term	
398	Martin Heinrich	D	NM-01	January 3, 2009	1st term	
399	Jim Himes	D	CT-04	January 3, 2009	1st term	
400	Duncan D. Hunter	R	CA-52	January 3, 2009	1st term	
401	Lynn Jenkins	R	KS-02	January 3, 2009	1st term	
402	Mary Jo Kilroy	D	OH-15	January 3, 2009	1st term	Left the House in 2011.
403	Ann Kirkpatrick	D	AZ-01	January 3, 2009	1st term	Left the House in 2011.
404	Larry Kissell	D	NC-08	January 3, 2009	1st term	
405	Suzanne Kosmas	D	FL-24	January 3, 2009	1st term	Left the House in 2011.
406	Frank Kratovil	D	MD-01	January 3, 2009	1st term	Left the House in 2011.
407	Leonard Lance	R	NJ-07	January 3, 2009	1st term	
408	Chris Lee	R	NY-26	January 3, 2009	1st term	
409	Blaine Luetkemeyer	R	MO-09	January 3, 2009	1st term	
410	Ben Ray Luján	D	NM-03	January 3, 2009	1st term	
411	Cynthia Lummis	R	WY-AL	January 3, 2009	1st term	
412	Tom McClintock	R	CA-04	January 3, 2009	1st term	
413	Michael McMahon	D	NY-13	January 3, 2009	1st term	Left the House in 2011.
414	Dan Maffei	D	NY-25	January 3, 2009	1st term	Left the House in 2011.
415	Betsy Markey	D	CO-04	January 3, 2009	1st term	Left the House in 2011.
416	Eric Massa	D	NY-29	January 3, 2009	1st term	Resigned on March 8, 2010
417	Walt Minnick	D	ID-01	January 3, 2009	1st term	Left the House in 2011.
418	Glenn Nye	D	VA-02	January 3, 2009	1st term	Left the House in 2011.
419	Pete Olson	R	TX-22	January 3, 2009	1st term	
420	Erik Paulsen	R	MN-03	January 3, 2009	1st term	
421	Tom Perriello	D	VA-05	January 3, 2009	1st term	Left the House in 2011.
422	Gary Peters	D	MI-09	January 3, 2009	1st term	
423	Chellie Pingree	D	ME-01	January 3, 2009	1st term	
424	Jared Polis	D	CO-02	January 3, 2009	1st term	
425	Bill Posey	R	FL-15	January 3, 2009	1st term	
426	Phil Roe	R	TN-01	January 3, 2009	1st term	
427	Tom Rooney	R	FL-16	January 3, 2009	1st term	
428	Mark Schauer	D	MI-07	January 3, 2009	1st term	Left the House in 2011.
429	Aaron Schock	R	IL-18	January 3, 2009	1st term	
430	Kurt Schrader	D	OR-05	January 3, 2009	1st term	
431	Harry Teague	D	NM-02	January 3, 2009	1st term	Left the House in 2011.
432	Glenn Thompson	R	PA-05	January 3, 2009	1st term	
433	Dina Titus	D	NV-03	January 3, 2009	1st term	Left the House in 2011.
434	Paul Tonko	D	NY-21	January 3, 2009	1st term	
	Mike Quigley	D	IL-05	April 7, 2009	1st term	
	Scott Murphy	D	NY-20	April 29, 2009	1st term	Left the House in 2011.
	Judy Chu	D	CA-32	July 14, 2009	1st term	
	John Garamendi	D	CA-10	November 3, 2009	1st term	
	Bill Owens	D	NY-23	November 3, 2009	1st term	
	Ted Deutch	D	FL-19	April 13, 2010	1st term	
	Mark Critz	D	PA-12	May 18, 2010	1st term	
	Charles Djou	R	HI-01	May 22, 2010	1st term	Left the House in 2011.
	Tom Graves	R	GA-09	June 8, 2010	1st term	
	Marlin Stutzman	R	IN-03	November 2, 2010	1st term	
	Tom Reed	R	NY-29	November 18, 2010	1st term	

== Delegates ==
Rank	Delegate	Party	District	Seniority date (Previous service, if any)	Term #	Notes
1	Eni Faleomavaega	D	AS	January 3, 1989	11th term	
2	Eleanor Holmes Norton	D	DC	January 3, 1991	10th term	
3	Donna Christian-Christensen	D	VI	January 3, 1997	7th term	
4	Madeleine Bordallo	D	GU	January 3, 2003	4th term	
5	Pedro Pierluisi	D	PR	January 3, 2009	1st term	
6	Gregorio Sablan	D	NMI	January 3, 2009	1st term	

== See also ==
- 111th United States Congress
- List of United States congressional districts
- List of United States senators in the 111th Congress
