= New York's 114th State Assembly district =

American legislative district

Assemblymember
Matt Simpson; R–Horicon

New York's 114th State Assembly district is one of the 150 districts in the New York State Assembly. It has been represented by Matt Simpson since 2021.

== Geography ==
=== 2020s ===
District 114 contains portions of Saratoga, Essex and Washington counties, and all of Warren County.

=== 2010s ===
District 114 contained portions of Saratoga and Washington counties, and all of Essex and Warren counties.

== Recent election results ==
=== 2026 ===
2026 New York State Assembly election, District 114
Party	Candidate	Votes	%
Republican	Matt Simpson		
Conservative	Matt Simpson		
Total	Matt Simpson (incumbent)		
Democratic	John Gunther		
Working Families	John Gunther		
Total	John Gunther		
Write-in			
Total votes			

=== 2024 ===
2024 New York State Assembly election, District 114
Party	Candidate	Votes	%
Republican	Matt Simpson	43,644	
Conservative	Matt Simpson	6,906	
Total	Matt Simpson (incumbent)	50,550	99.2
Write-in		387	0.8
Total votes		50,937	100.0
Republican hold			

=== 2022 ===
2022 New York State Assembly election, District 114
Party	Candidate	Votes	%
Republican	Matt Simpson	35,256	
Conservative	Matt Simpson	5,012	
Total	Matt Simpson (incumbent)	40,268	99.5
Write-in		197	0.5
Total votes		40,465	100.0
Republican hold			

=== 2020 ===
2020 New York State Assembly election, District 114
Party	Candidate	Votes	%
Republican	Matt Simpson	33,762	
Conservative	Matt Simpson	2,954	
Independence	Matt Simpson	871	
Total	Matt Simpson	37,587	56.7
Democratic	Claudia Braymer	25,590	
Working Families	Claudia Braymer	2,434	
Total	Claudia Braymer	28,024	42.3
SAM	Evelyn Wood	630	1.0
Write-in		25	0.0
Total votes		66,266	100.0
Republican hold			

=== 2018 ===
2018 New York State Assembly election, District 114
Party	Candidate	Votes	%
Republican	Dan Stec	28,458	
Conservative	Dan Stec	2,953	
Independence	Dan Stec	2,478	
Total	Dan Stec (incumbent)	33,889	80.8
Working Families	Kathryn Wilson	8,044	19.2
Write-in		33	0.0
Total votes		41,966	100.0
Republican hold			

=== 2016 ===
2016 New York State Assembly election, District 114
Party	Candidate	Votes	%
Republican	Dan Stec	35,252	
Conservative	Dan Stec	3,903	
Independence	Dan Stec	3,386	
Reform	Dan Stec	236	
Total	Dan Stec (incumbent)	42,777	84.9
Green	Robin Barkenhagen	7,562	15.0
Write-in		24	0.1
Total votes		50,363	100.0
Republican hold			

=== 2014 ===
2014 New York State Assembly election, District 114
Party	Candidate	Votes	%
Republican	Dan Stec	21,934	
Independence	Dan Stec	4,350	
Conservative	Dan Stec	2,993	
Total	Dan Stec (incumbent)	29,277	99.6
Write-in		128	0.4
Total votes		29,405	100.0
Republican hold			

=== 2012 ===
2012 New York State Assembly election, District 114
Party	Candidate	Votes	%
Republican	Dan Stec	24,697	
Conservative	Dan Stec	2,720	
Independence	Dan Stec	1,533	
Total	Dan Stec	28,950	55.6
Democratic	Dennis Tarantino	21,109	
Working Families	Dennis Tarantino	1,935	
Total	Dennis Tarantino	23,044	44.3
Write-in		31	0.1
Total votes		52,025	100.0
Republican hold			
