= Dan Stec =

American politician (born 1969)

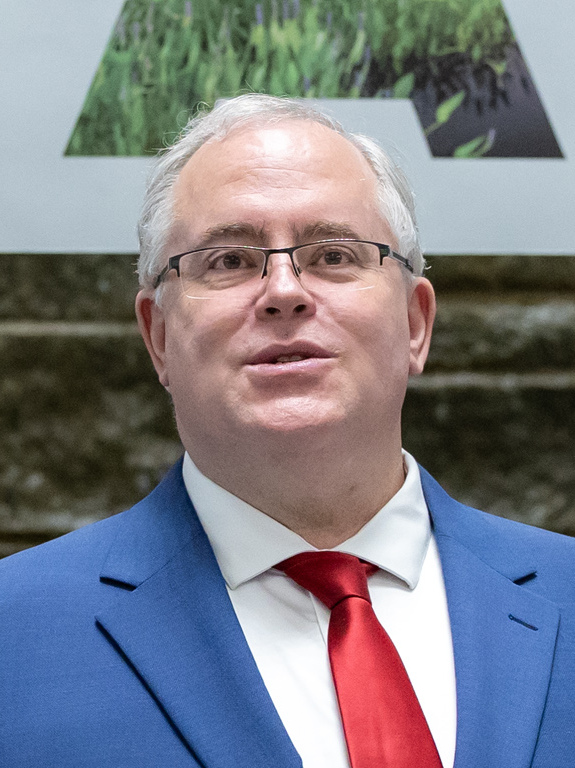
- Stec in 2025

Member of the New York State Senate from the 45th district
- Incumbent
- Assumed office January 1, 2021
- Preceded by: Betty Little

Member of the New York State Assembly from the 114th district
- In office January 1, 2013 – December 31, 2020
- Preceded by: Janet Duprey
- Succeeded by: Matt Simpson

Personal details
- Born: Daniel George Stec; February 21, 1969 (age 57)
- Party: Republican
- Spouse: Hilary
- Children: 1
- Education: Clarkson University (BS); University of Rhode Island (MBA)
- Website: State Senate website

Military service
- Branch/service: United States Navy
- Battles/wars: Gulf War

Daniel George Stec (born February 21, 1969) is an American politician serving as a member of the New York State Senate for the 45th district. He represents all of Clinton, Essex, Franklin, and Warren Counties, and parts of St. Lawrence County and Washington County in North Country. He previously represented the 114th district of the New York State Assembly from 2013 to 2020.

== Early life and career ==
Stec was born to George, a Vietnam War veteran and New York State Forest Ranger, and Elsie, a school secretary. He was raised in Queensbury, New York and graduated from Queensbury High School in 1987. He earned a Bachelor of Science degree in chemical engineering from Clarkson University in Potsdam, New York.

== Career ==
In 2011, Stec became the chairman of the Warren County Board of Supervisors. He was elected to the New York State Assembly in 2012, serving until 2020. He was elected to the New York State Senate in 2020, defeating Clinton County Treasurer Kimberly Davis.
