= 2009 New York's 20th congressional district special election =

- March 31, 2009

New York's 20th congressional district
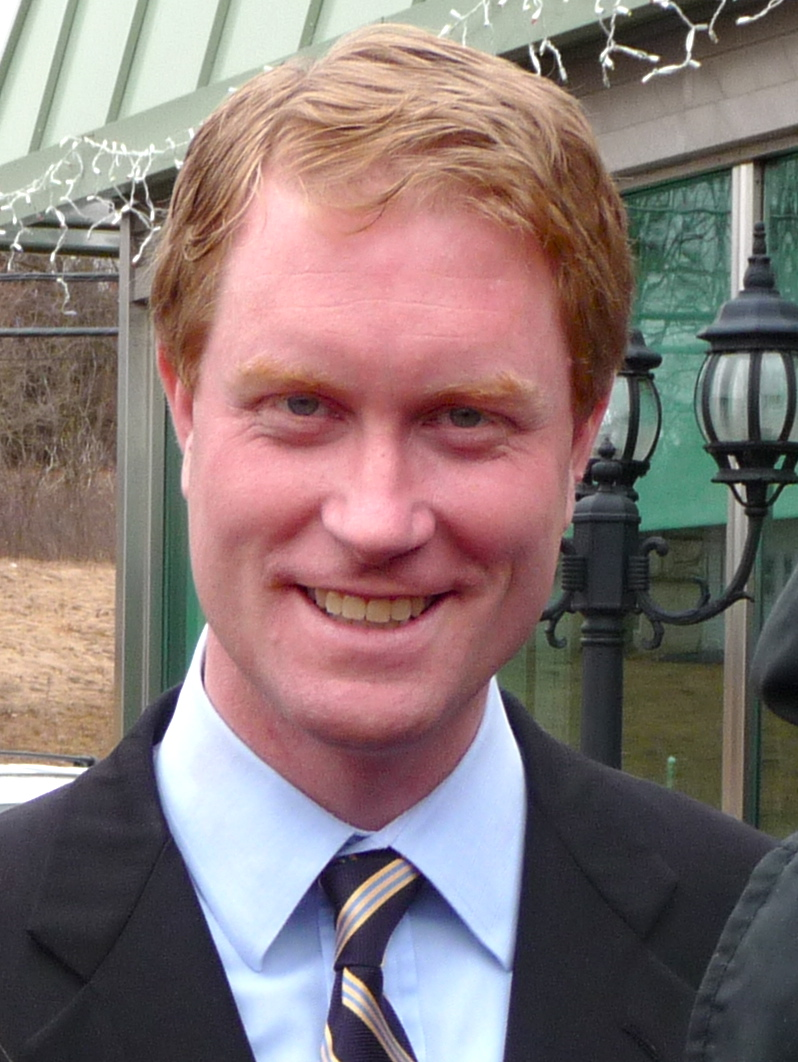

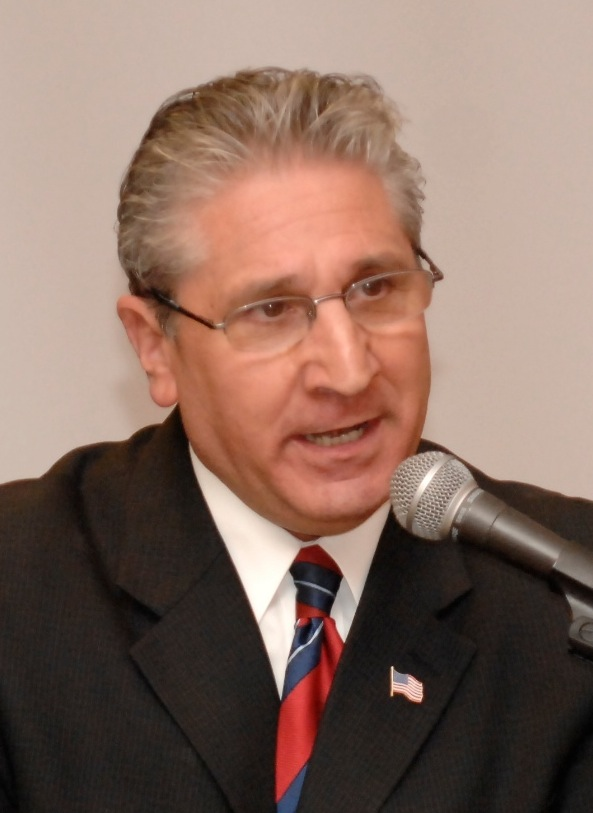
Nominee	Scott Murphy	Jim Tedisco
Party	Democratic	Republican
Popular vote	80,833	80,107
Percentage	50.23%	49.77%
- County results Murphy: 50–60% Tedisco: 50–60%
U.S. Representative before election
Kirsten Gillibrand
Democratic
Elected U.S. Representative
Scott Murphy
Democratic

On March 31, 2009, New York held a special election to fill a vacancy in its 20th congressional district. In January, the district's representative, Kirsten Gillibrand, was appointed US senator from New York, replacing Hillary Clinton, who had been appointed secretary of state in the Obama administration. The two major-party candidates were Scott Murphy, a Democrat and private businessman, and Jim Tedisco, a Republican and the minority leader of the New York State Assembly. A Libertarian candidate, Eric Sundwall, was initially included in the race, but later removed from the ballot.

The 20th congressional district has historically been conservative, and early polls favored Tedisco, but by February 2009 the race was considered a toss-up. The Republican Party considered the election to be a referendum on President Obama's economic policy and as such, injected significant funding into Tedisco's campaign, using well-known Republicans such as former Speaker of the House Newt Gingrich, House Minority Leader John Boehner, and former New York governor George Pataki for support. Democrats used Senator Gillibrand, Vice President Joe Biden, and an endorsement from President Obama to support the Murphy campaign.

Major issues brought up during the campaign were the candidates' positions on President Obama's stimulus plan, which Tedisco did not take a stance on until late in the race. Murphy supported it while Tedisco eventually opposed it. Tedisco portrayed Murphy's support of the plan as a potential cause of the AIG bonus scandal. Tedisco's campaign also brought up Murphy's failure to pay taxes on a company he founded in the 1990s. A frequent Murphy talking point was that Tedisco's primary residence was not in the Congressional district.

The race was so close that one early vote count had the candidates tied at 77,225 votes each. Absentee ballots decided the election; ballots were accepted until April 13. While Tedisco had been ahead in early counts, by April 10, Murphy was leading, and by April 23 Murphy had a 401-vote advantage. Tedisco conceded the race the following day, and Murphy was sworn in on April 29. Democratic electoral successes in November 2008 and Murphy's clear support of the stimulus package were credited for his success.

== Background ==
New York's 20th congressional district in 2009 encompassed all or part of Columbia, Dutchess, Delaware, Essex, Greene, Otsego, Rensselaer, Saratoga, Warren, and Washington counties. Traditionally conservative, it had been considered a safe seat for Republicans (Note: After redistricting in 2002, then-Congressman John E. Sweeney was quoted as saying that "no Republican can ever lose" the district.) until Blue Dog Democrat Kirsten Gillibrand defeated incumbent John E. Sweeney in the 2006 election. In November 2008, the Republican Party held an enrollment advantage of 70,632 registered voters across the district, down from a 93,337-voter advantage when the district lines were drawn by the New York State Legislature in 2002. Although Republican George W. Bush carried the district by an eight-point margin in the 2004 presidential election, Democrat Barack Obama won the district in 2008 by a three-point margin, or approximately 10,000 votes of over 330,000 cast. Gillibrand was reelected in 2008 by 24 points, a fourfold increase over her 2006 margin.

One of Barack Obama's first decisions as president-elect was to appoint Hillary Clinton, U.S. Senator from New York and former Democratic presidential primary opponent, as Secretary of State; Clinton resigned her Senate seat to take the position. The district's seat became vacant in January 2009 when Governor David Paterson appointed Gillibrand to the United States Senate to replace Clinton. On February 23, 2009, Governor Paterson issued a proclamation setting the date for the special election as March 31, 2009. Under state law, Paterson was not required to issue a proclamation for a special election until July 2010. Both the Rothenberg Political Report and the Cook Political Report listed the race as a toss-up.

== Candidates ==
In lieu of party primaries, the party nominees were chosen by a weighted vote among the county committees. The weight of the vote depended on the population of registered party voters (Republican or Democrat) in a given county.

=== Republican Party ===
State Senator Betty Little and former state Assembly minority leader and 2006 Republican gubernatorial candidate John Faso had been in the running for the Republican nomination. Richard Wager, a former aide to New York City Mayor Michael Bloomberg, and State Senator Stephen Saland had also been mentioned. Alexander "Sandy" Treadwell, the former New York Secretary of State and 2008 U.S. House challenger, had announced he would not run. On January 24, State Assembly Minority Leader Jim Tedisco received the endorsement of Saratoga County's Republican chairman, while the Greene County GOP endorsed Faso.

Jim Tedisco was the eventual Republican nominee, winning the GOP nomination on January 27, 2009. Tedisco represented the 110th Assembly District, which includes a significant portion of Saratoga County. Tedisco's primary residence was not in the congressional district, although he did own a house in Saratoga Springs and much of his assembly district overlapped the congressional district. This issue would become a major talking point during the campaign.

=== Democratic Party ===
On January 31, The Post-Star reported that the Democrats had narrowed the field of potential candidates from over two dozen applicants down to six. The Democratic chairpersons met with all six candidates at a diner in Albany on February 1, and selected Scott Murphy of Glens Falls, president of the Upstate Venture Association of New York, as their candidate. Other confirmed candidates included Saratoga County Democratic Chairman Larry Bulman, former New York Rangers goaltender Mike Richter, Coxsackie Town Supervisor Alex Betke, and Tracey Brooks, failed candidate for the nomination for the 21st district election in 2008.

=== Third parties ===
New York allows electoral fusion, which is an arrangement allowing two or more qualified parties to list the same candidate on a ballot. The Conservative Party chose to cross-endorse Tedisco on February 9, while the Working Families Party gave its endorsement to Murphy on February 17. On March 1, the Independence Party, the largest third party in the 20th district, gave its endorsement to Murphy. This was the first time the Independence Party had endorsed a Democrat in the district.

Eric Sundwall, Chair of the New York Libertarian Party, was the Libertarian candidate for the seat. However, he was removed from the ballot on March 25, after 3,786 of the 6,730 signatures his campaign had collected were ruled invalid. Under state election law, independent congressional candidates must collect at least 3,500 valid signatures to be on the ballot. Two Saratoga County residents challenged over 6,000 of Sundwall's signatures; Sundwall blamed Tedisco for the effort to have him removed from the ballot. The vast majority of the rejected signatures were from voters who put down their mailing address instead of the municipality in which they physically lived. Votes for Sundwall on absentee ballots, which were mailed out before he was removed from the ballot, were voided. On March 27, Sundwall announced that he would vote for Murphy in the election and urged his supporters to join him.

== Campaign ==
The campaigns agreed to hold four debates. The first debate took place on March 2, between Tedisco and Murphy. The second debate, sponsored by WMHT and the Times Union, took place on March 19 between Murphy and Libertarian candidate Eric Sundwall. Jim Tedisco held a town hall meeting rather than attend, claiming the debate was not one of the four originally agreed upon. The third debate took place on March 23 and the final debate was on March 26.

Strategists from both parties viewed the outcome of the race as a "referendum on President Obama's handling of the economy". Chairman Michael Steele of the Republican National Committee said the special election was the first of three elections that were "incredibly important" for the Republicans to win. The Republican leadership made this race a top priority, and Chairman Steele, former Governor George Pataki, House Minority Leader John Boehner, and former Speaker of the House Newt Gingrich helped Tedisco with fundraising. Steele visited the district twice. On the Democratic side, Senator Gillibrand appeared in commercials and robocalls for Murphy, and Senator Chuck Schumer helped Murphy's campaign with fundraising. Less than a week before the election, President Obama formally endorsed Murphy in a mass email to supporters and urged supporters to organize and vote for Murphy. A radio ad Vice President Joe Biden recorded for Murphy was released on March 25. That same day, Democratic National Committee (DNC) Chairman Tim Kaine emailed 500 of the party's top donors asking them to contribute to Murphy's campaign.

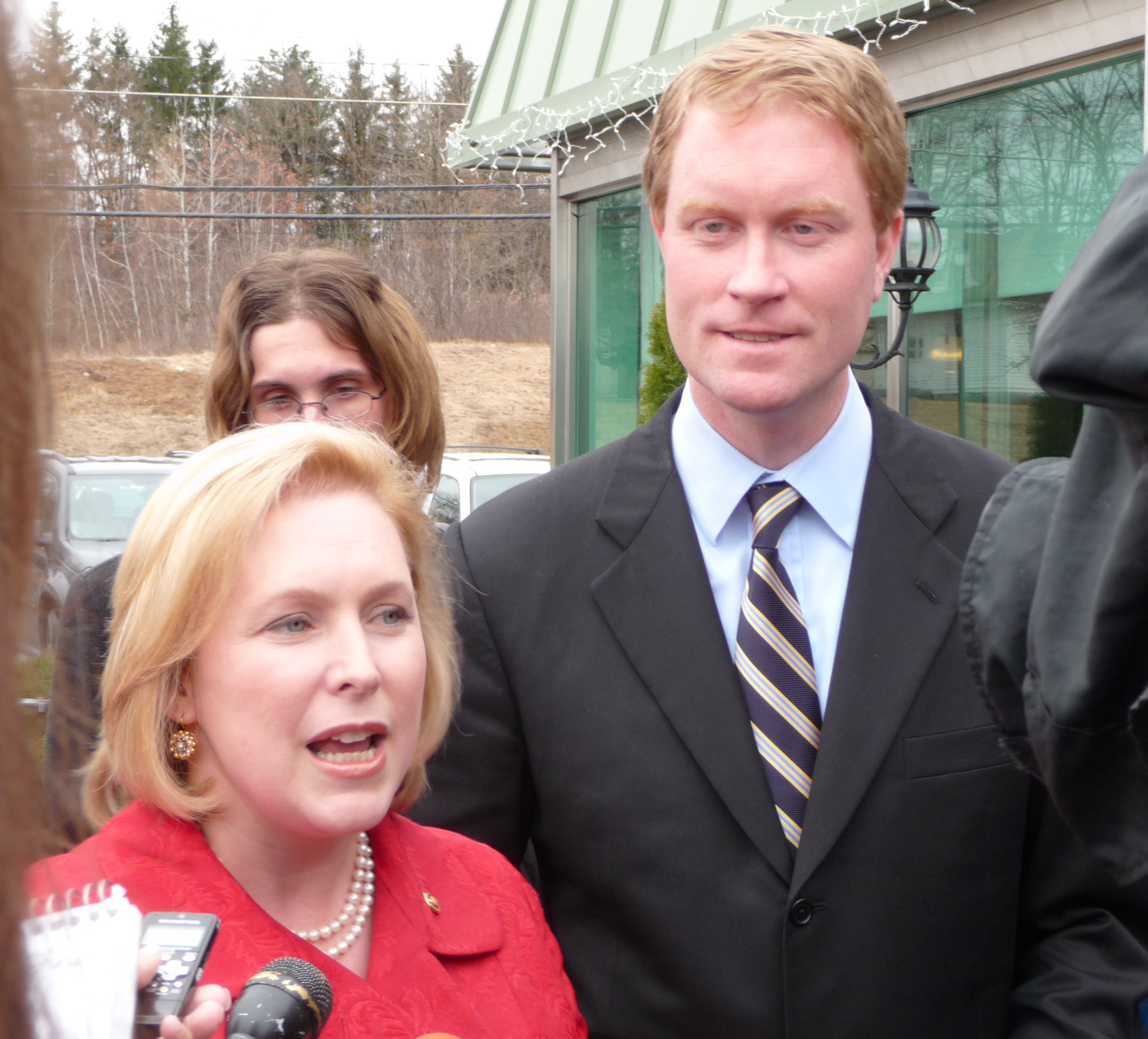
Scott Murphy and Senator Kirsten Gillibrand at a campaign stop on March 29, 2009

The RNC spent $100,000 on Tedisco's behalf. The Democratic Congressional Campaign Committee spent $150,000 and the Service Employees International Union spent $315,000 for Murphy. The New York State United Teachers made an effort to call its members on Murphy's behalf, while the National Right to Life, National Republican Trust and New York State Rifle and Pistol Association organizations paid for ads and mailings supporting Tedisco.

Each candidate aimed to discredit the other by pointing out his opponent's flaws or mistakes. Republicans called attention to Murphy's failure to pay taxes on a start-up computer software company he had founded in the 1990s, drawing comparison to three high-profile Obama administration nominees who failed to pay all of their taxes. Tedisco also called attention to Murphy's failure to regularly vote in elections after the National Republican Congressional Committee (NRCC) announced that Murphy had failed to vote in the 2000 presidential election, along with seven other primaries and general elections between 2000 and 2003. Believing the negative ads run by the NRCC were responsible for his drop in the polls, Tedisco announced that he would take control of campaign advertising from the NRCC.

Murphy spent the first months of the campaign criticizing Tedisco's early refusal to disclose his position on President Obama's American Recovery and Reinvestment Act. When Tedisco came out in opposition to the legislation on March 16, Murphy responded by writing "it's just shameful it took well over a month for Assemblyman Tedisco to finally admit that he'd vote 'No'". Murphy's campaign described Tedisco as a career Albany politician.

By mid-March, a provision in the stimulus package that grandfathered in bonuses paid to executives at troubled insurance giant AIG and other TARP recipients became a campaign issue. Tedisco, who had been criticized by Murphy for opposing the package, used the outrage over the AIG bonuses to reframe the debate. On March 19, Tedisco called for the resignation of Treasury Secretary Tim Geithner over the AIG controversy. Murphy responded by insisting that the stimulus package was necessary for job creation.

=== Media endorsements ===
- March 22, 2009: Declaring "the upcoming special election in the 20th Congressional District nothing less than a referendum on the Obama economic stimulus plan", the Kingston-based Daily Freeman endorsed Murphy for his support of the plan.
- March 22, 2009: Expressing a desire for "having candid, dissenting voices in any political body to keep the majority from going astray", the Poughkeepsie Journal endorsed Tedisco.
- March 26, 2009: Calling him "[not] ideal... [but] the better candidate", the Glens Falls-based The Chronicle gave Jim Tedisco its endorsement.
- March 26, 2009: The New York Post gave its support to Jim Tedisco, calling him "a far better fit for the largely conservative district".
- March 29, 2009: While acknowledging Tedisco's role in creating the STAR Program and his vocal support for a property tax cap, The Times Union endorsed Murphy as "a candidate who would work with Mr. Obama to achieve his goals".
- March 29, 2009: Citing the need for "an experienced, effective representative in Congress", The Post-Star endorsed Tedisco.
- March 29, 2009: Impressed by his "public service, experience and political philosophy", as well as his opposition to a union card check bill, The Saratogian endorsed Tedisco.
- March 29, 2009: Claiming that "Tedisco has the track record that will make him a solid check and balance in Washington", the Troy Record endorsed Tedisco.

=== Polling ===
Poll source	Date administered	Scott Murphy (D)	Jim Tedisco (R)	Eric Sundwall (L)
Siena Research Institute	March 25–26	47%	43%	2%
Siena Research Institute	March 9–10	41%	45%	1%
Benenson Strategy Group^{‡}	February 24–25	37%	44%	4%
Siena Research Institute	February 18–19	34%	46%	—N/a
Public Opinion Strategies^{†}	February 3–4	29%	50%	—N/a

^{†} Commissioned by Tedisco's campaign and the NRCC
^{‡} Commissioned by the DCCC

== Results ==
With 100 percent of precincts reporting, initial counts from the election had Murphy leading by about 60 votes out of over 150,000 cast. Columbia County's Board of Elections amended its tally the following day, reducing Murphy's lead to 25 votes. The lead alternated between the two candidates throughout early recanvassing; at one point the New York State Board of Elections had listed the election at a zero-vote margin, with each candidate having exactly 77,225 votes. By April 2, Tedisco was ahead by 12 votes. He resigned the position of Assembly Minority Leader on April 5 in preparation for a transition to Congress, and was replaced by Brian Kolb the following day. On April 7, Tedisco was ahead by 97 votes. The close tally meant that absentee ballots would decide the race.

All ballots, absentee ballot envelopes, and voting machines were impounded under a court injunction sought by state Republicans. Under the court order, absentee ballots were counted in central locations rather than individual precincts. Of the 10,000 absentee ballots sent out to voters, 6,000 were returned. Absentee ballots mailed within the United States had to be received by April 7 to be counted. The deadline for overseas (including military) ballots was extended to April 13 after the United States Department of Justice sued the state to ensure they would have a reasonable chance of being counted. Counting of the absentee ballots due by April 7 began on April 8 under a New York State Supreme Court ruling sought by Murphy's campaign.

The legality of about 600 absentee ballots were contested during the count, including Senator Gillibrand's ballot. By April 23, Murphy was ahead by 401 votes, and Tedisco conceded the following day. Murphy was sworn in on April 29. The official results came out in May and had Murphy winning the election with 80,833 votes (50.23%) against Tedisco's 80,107 votes (49.77%).

Unofficial results
Date	Scott Murphy	Jim Tedisco	Difference
April 3	77,225	77,225	0
April 6	76,817	76,914	97
April 7	77,017	77,034	17
April 8	77,018	77,035	17
April 9	76,992	77,060	68
April 10	77,773	77,727	46
April 13	77,907	77,882	25
April 14	77,982	77,935	47
April 15	79,105	79,019	86
April 16	79,452	79,274	178
April 17	79,839	79,566	273
April 23	80,368	79,967	401

2009 NY-20 special congressional election
Party	Candidate	Votes	%	±%
Democratic	Scott Murphy	70,240		
Independence	Scott Murphy	6,754		
Working Families	Scott Murphy	3,839		
Total	Scott Murphy	80,833	50.23	
Republican	Jim Tedisco	68,775		
Conservative	Jim Tedisco	11,332		
Total	Jim Tedisco	80,107	49.77	
Majority		726		
Turnout		160,940		
Democratic hold		Swing	−11.9	

=== By county ===
By county

County	Scott Murphy Democratic		James Tedisco Republican		Margin		Total votes
County	#	%	#	%	#	%	Total votes
Columbia	9,161	57.2%	6,852	42.8%	2,309	14.4%	16,013
Delaware (part)	3,506	49.99%	3,509	50.01%	-3	-0.02%	7,015
Dutchess (part)	10,019	51.9%	9,304	48.1%	715	3.8%	19,323
Essex (part)	1,375	55.5%	1,101	44.5%	274	11.0%	2,476
Greene	4,607	44.6%	5,724	55.4%	-1,117	-10.8%	10,331
Otsego (part)	1,084	48.6%	1,147	51.4%	-63	-2.8%	2,231
Rensselaer (part)	7,837	48.6%	8,293	51.4%	-456	-2.8%	16,130
Saratoga (part)	26,290	45.8%	31,066	54.2%	-4,776	-8.4%	57,356
Warren	9,323	56.1%	7,298	43.9%	2,025	12.2%	16,621
Washington	7,631	56.8%	5,813	43.2%	1,818	13.6%	13,444
Totals	80,833	50.2%	80,107	49.8%	726	0.4%	160,940

== Aftermath ==
Murphy's victory was credited to a coattail effect from Barack Obama's election in 2008. His support of the stimulus package, coupled with Tedisco's failed attempt at cogently explaining his own opposition to the package, also may have had an impact. Further explanations for the Republican defeat ranged from accusations that Tedisco "dither[ed] on the stimulus bill", to intimations that Tedisco only became his party's nominee by manipulating the selection process. In an editorial, the Wall Street Journal contended that being an "Albany careerist" and running confusing campaign ads had hurt Tedisco. Tedisco's loss immediately made him appear vulnerable to Democrats hoping to capture his seat in the Assembly.

The day after being sworn in, Murphy hired Todd Schulte, his campaign manager, as his new chief of staff. He also hired one of Governor Paterson's aides, Maggie McKeon, as his communications director. For his district director, Murphy turned to Rob Scholz, a Republican. Scholz had worked on Murphy's campaign and had received praise from Larry Bulman, the chairman of the Saratoga County Democratic Committee. Within a month of being elected, Murphy opened offices in Saratoga Springs and Hudson. Murphy served the remainder of his term, but lost a reelection bid on November 2, 2010, to challenger Chris Gibson, a retired Army colonel.

== See also ==
- Special elections to the 111th United States Congress
