= List of United States senators in the 111th Congress =

This is a complete list of United States senators during the 111th United States Congress listed by seniority from January 3, 2009, to January 3, 2011. It is a historical listing and contains people who had not served the entire two-year Congress, such as Joe Biden and Hillary Clinton.

Order of service is based on the commencement of the senator's first term. Following this is former service as a U.S. senator (only giving the senator seniority within their new incoming class), service as vice president, a U.S. representative, a cabinet secretary, a state governor. Others are separated by his or her state's population.

Senators who were sworn in during the middle of the two-year Congress (up until the last senator who was not sworn in early after winning the November 2010 election) are listed at the end of the list with no number. However, Roland Burris and Al Franken are listed as numbers 99 and 100. Burris was appointed at the end of the previous Congress, but was blocked from taking his seat until January 12, 2009, and Franken won the United States Senate election in Minnesota, 2008, but was unable to take his seat until July 7, 2009, due to an election contest.

John Kerry was the most senior junior senator from the opening of the 111th Congress until the death of Ted Kennedy in August 2009, whereupon Tom Harkin took on the distinction. Amy Klobuchar was the most junior senior senator in the first eighteen days of the Congress until Mark Udall, a freshman, became Colorado's senior senator upon Ken Salazar's resignation in late January 2009 to become Interior Secretary.

== Terms of service ==
Class	Terms of service of senators that expired in years
Class 3	Terms of service of senators that expired in 2011 (AK, AL, AR, AZ, CA, CO, CT, FL, GA, HI, IA, ID, IL, IN, KS, KY, LA, MD, MO, NC, ND, NV, NH, NY, OH, OK, OR, PA, SC, SD, UT, VT, WA, and WI.)
Class 1	Terms of service of senators that expired in 2013 (AZ, CA, CT, DE, FL, HI, IN, MA, MD, ME, MI, MN, MO, MS, MT, ND, NE, NJ, NM, NV, NY, OH, PA, RI, TN, TX, UT, VA, VT, WA, WV, WI, and WY.)
Class 2	Terms of service of senators that expired in 2015 (AK, AL, AR, CO, DE, GA, IA, ID, IL, KS, KY, LA, MA, ME, MI, MN, MS, MT, NC, NE, NH, NJ, NM, OK, OR, RI, SC, SD, TN, TX, VA, WV, and WY.)

== U.S. Senate seniority list ==
U.S. Senate seniority
Rank	Historical rank	Senator (party-state)	Seniority date	Other factors
1	1578	Robert Byrd (Note: In West Virginia, Robert Byrd (D) died on June 28, 2010. He was replaced by Carte Goodwin (D), who was appointed by Governor Joe Manchin until a special election could be held to serve a successor. In that special election, Manchin won to finish Byrd's term.) (D-WV)	January 3, 1959	
2	1608	Ted Kennedy (Note: In Massachusetts, Ted Kennedy (D) died on August 25, 2009. He was replaced by Paul G. Kirk (D), who was appointed by Governor Deval Patrick until a special election could be held to serve a successor. In that special election, Scott Brown (R) won to finish Kennedy's term.) (D-MA)	November 7, 1962	
3	1614	Daniel Inouye (D-HI)	January 3, 1963	
4	1680	Joe Biden (Note: In Delaware, Joe Biden (D) was elected both the vice president and Senate at the same time. He stepped down from his Senate seat on January 15, 2009 in anticipation of becoming Vice President of the United States. He was replaced by Ted Kaufman (D), who was appointed by Governor Ruth Ann Minner until a special election could be held to serve a successor. In that special election, Chris Coons (D) won to finish Biden's term.) (D-DE)	January 3, 1973	
5	1692	Patrick Leahy (D-VT)	January 3, 1975	
6	1705	Richard Lugar (R-IN)	January 3, 1977	Indiana 11th in population (1970)
7	1708	Orrin Hatch (R-UT)	January 3, 1977	Utah 36th in population (1970)
8	1717	Max Baucus (D-MT)	December 15, 1978	
9	1719	Thad Cochran (R-MS)	December 27, 1978	
10	1730	Carl Levin (D-MI)	January 3, 1979	
11	1742	Chris Dodd (D-CT)	January 3, 1981	Former member of the U.S. House of Representatives (6 years); Connecticut 24th in population (1970)
12	1743	Chuck Grassley (R-IA)	January 3, 1981	Former member of the U.S. House of Representatives (6 years); Iowa 25th in population (1970)
13	1747	Arlen Specter (R, D (Note: Despite Arlen Specter's party change, he retained his seniority since there was no break in his Senate service.)-PA)	January 3, 1981	
14	1759	Jeff Bingaman (D-NM)	January 3, 1983	
15	1761	John Kerry (D-MA)	January 2, 1985	
16	1763	Tom Harkin (D-IA)	January 3, 1985	Former member of the U.S. House of Representatives
17	1766	Mitch McConnell (R-KY)	January 3, 1985	
18	1767	Jay Rockefeller (D-WV)	January 15, 1985	
19	1773	Barbara Mikulski (D-MD)	January 3, 1987	Former member of the U.S. House of Representatives (10 years)
20	1775	Richard Shelby (R-AL)	January 3, 1987	Former member of the U.S. House of Representatives (8 years)
21	1777	John McCain (R-AZ)	January 3, 1987	Former member of the U.S. House of Representatives (4 years); Arizona 29th in population (1980)
22	1778	Harry Reid (D-NV)	January 3, 1987	Former member of the U.S. House of Representatives (4 years); Nevada 43rd in population (1980)
23	1780	Kit Bond (R-MO)	January 3, 1987	Former governor
24	1781	Kent Conrad (D-ND)	January 3, 1987	
25	1790	Herb Kohl (D-WI)	January 3, 1989	Wisconsin 16th in population (1980)
26	1791	Joe Lieberman (I (Note: Despite Joe Lieberman's 2006 party change, he retains his seniority since there is no break in his Senate service.)-CT)	January 3, 1989	Connecticut 25th in population (1980)
27	1793	Daniel Akaka (D-HI)	May 16, 1990	
28	1801	Dianne Feinstein (D-CA)	November 10, 1992	
29	1802	Byron Dorgan (D-ND)	December 15, 1992	
30	1804	Barbara Boxer (D-CA)	January 3, 1993	Former member of the U.S. House of Representatives (10 years)
31	1805	Judd Gregg (R-NH)	January 3, 1993	Former member of the U.S. House of Representatives (8 years)
32	1811	Russ Feingold (D-WI)	January 3, 1993	Wisconsin 16th in population (1990)
33	1812	Patty Murray (D-WA)	January 3, 1993	Washington 18th in population (1990)
34	1813	Bob Bennett (R-UT)	January 3, 1993	Utah 35th in population (1990)
35	1815	Kay Bailey Hutchison (R-TX)	June 14, 1993	
36	1816	Jim Inhofe (R-OK)	November 17, 1994	
37	1817	Olympia Snowe (R-ME)	January 3, 1995	Former member of the U.S. House of Representatives (16 years)
38	1819	Jon Kyl (R-AZ)	January 3, 1995	Former member of the U.S. House of Representatives (8 years)
39	1827	Ron Wyden (D-OR)	February 6, 1996	
40	1829	Sam Brownback (R-KS)	November 7, 1996	
41	1830	Pat Roberts (R-KS)	January 3, 1997	Former member of the U.S. House of Representatives (16 years)
42	1831	Dick Durbin (D-IL)	January 3, 1997	Former member of the U.S. House of Representatives (14 years)
43	1833	Tim Johnson (D-SD)	January 3, 1997	Former member of the U.S. House of Representatives (10 years)
44	1835	Jack Reed (D-RI)	January 3, 1997	Former member of the U.S. House of Representatives (6 years)
45	1838	Mary Landrieu (D-LA)	January 3, 1997	Louisiana 21st in population (1990)
46	1839	Jeff Sessions (R-AL)	January 3, 1997	Alabama 22nd in population (1990)
47	1842	Susan Collins (R-ME)	January 3, 1997	Maine 38th in population (1990)
48	1843	Mike Enzi (R-WY)	January 3, 1997	Wyoming 50th in population (1990)
49	1844	Chuck Schumer (D-NY)	January 3, 1999	Former member of the U.S. House of Representatives (18 years)
50	1845	Jim Bunning (R-KY)	January 3, 1999	Former member of the U.S. House of Representatives (12 years)
51	1846	Mike Crapo (R-ID)	January 3, 1999	Former member of the U.S. House of Representatives (6 years)
52	1847	Blanche Lincoln (D-AR)	January 3, 1999	Former member of the U.S. House of Representatives (4 years)
53	1848	George Voinovich (R-OH)	January 3, 1999	Former governor; Ohio 7th in population (1990)
54	1849	Evan Bayh (D-IN)	January 3, 1999	Former governor; Indiana 15th in population (1990)
55	1854	Bill Nelson (D-FL)	January 3, 2001	Former member of the U.S. House of Representatives (12 years)
56	1855	Tom Carper (D-DE)	January 3, 2001	Former member of the U.S. House of Representatives (10 years)
57	1856	Debbie Stabenow (D-MI)	January 3, 2001	Former member of the U.S. House of Representatives (4 years); Michigan 8th in population (1990)
58	1857	John Ensign (R-NV)	January 3, 2001	Former member of the U.S. House of Representatives (4 years); Nevada 39th in population (1990)
59	1859	Maria Cantwell (D-WA)	January 3, 2001	Former member of the U.S. House of Representatives (2 years)
60	1860	Ben Nelson (D-NE)	January 3, 2001	Former governor
61	1861	Hillary Clinton (Note: In New York, Hillary Clinton (D) resigned her seat on January 21, 2009, to become secretary of state. She was replaced by Kirsten Gillibrand (D), who was appointed by Governor David Paterson.) (Note: Hillary Clinton's status as a former first lady, while having some bearing on ceremonial precedence, has no effect on her seniority within the United states Senate.) (D-NY)	January 3, 2001	
62	1867	John Cornyn (R-TX)	December 2, 2002	
63	1868	Lisa Murkowski (R-AK)	December 20, 2002	
64	1755 (Note: Frank Lautenberg (D) served a previous term as U.S. senator from New Jersey from December 1982 to January 2001, but does not retain seniority from that prior service. Lautenberg has sought restoration of his seniority based on his prior service, but has not received it. Second Time Isn't as Lovely for Lautenberg, New York Times)	Frank Lautenberg (D-NJ)	January 3, 2003	Previously a Senator
65	1869	Saxby Chambliss (R-GA)	January 3, 2003	Former member of the U.S. House of Representatives (8 years); Georgia 10th in population (2000)
66	1870	Lindsey Graham (R-SC)	January 3, 2003	Former member of the U.S. House of Representatives (8 years); South Carolina 26th in population (2000)
67	1872	Lamar Alexander (R-TN)	January 3, 2003	Former cabinet member
68	1875	Mark Pryor (D-AR)	January 3, 2003	
69	1876	Richard Burr (R-NC)	January 3, 2005	Former member of the U.S. House of Representatives (10 years)
70	1877	Jim DeMint (R-SC)	January 3, 2005	Former member of the U.S. House of Representatives (6 years); South Carolina 26th in population (2000)
71	1878	Tom Coburn (R-OK)	January 3, 2005	Former member of the U.S. House of Representatives (6 years); Oklahoma 27th in population (2000)
72	1879	John Thune (R-SD)	January 3, 2005	Former member of the U.S. House of Representatives (6 years); South Dakota 46th in population (2000)
73	1880	Johnny Isakson (R-GA)	January 3, 2005	Former member of the U.S. House of Representatives (5 years, 10 months)
74	1881	David Vitter (R-LA)	January 3, 2005	Former member of the U.S. House of Representatives (5 years, 7 months)
75	1882	Mel Martínez (Note: In Florida, Mel Martínez (R) resigned on September 9, 2009 after declined to seek re-election. He was replaced by George LeMieux (R), who was appointed by Governor Charlie Crist.) (R-FL)	January 3, 2005	Former cabinet member
76	1884	Ken Salazar (Note: In Colorado, Ken Salazar (D) resigned on January 20, 2009, to become Secretary of the Interior. He was replaced by Michael Bennet (D), who was appointed by Governor Bill Ritter.) (D-CO)	January 3, 2005	
77	1885	Bob Menendez (D-NJ)	January 17, 2006	
78	1886	Ben Cardin (D-MD)	January 3, 2007	Former member of the U.S. House of Representatives (20 years)
79	1887	Bernie Sanders (I-VT)	January 3, 2007	Former member of the U.S. House of Representatives (16 years)
80	1888	Sherrod Brown (D-OH)	January 3, 2007	Former member of the U.S. House of Representatives (14 years)
81	1889	Bob Casey, Jr. (D-PA)	January 3, 2007	Pennsylvania 6th in population (2000)
82	1890	Jim Webb (Note: Jim Webb's service as Secretary of the Navy does not affect his seniority because it was not a Cabinet-level position during or after his term.) (D-VA)	January 3, 2007	Virginia 12th in population (2000)
83	1891	Bob Corker (R-TN)	January 3, 2007	Tennessee 16th in population (2000)
84	1892	Claire McCaskill (D-MO)	January 3, 2007	Missouri 17th in population (2000)
85	1893	Amy Klobuchar (D-MN)	January 3, 2007	Minnesota 21st in population (2000)
86	1894	Sheldon Whitehouse (D-RI)	January 3, 2007	Rhode Island 43rd in population (2000)
87	1895	Jon Tester (D-MT)	January 3, 2007	Montana 44th in population (2000)
88	1896	John Barrasso (R-WY)	June 25, 2007	
89	1897	Roger Wicker (R-MS)	December 31, 2007	
90	1898	Mark Udall (D-CO)	January 3, 2009	Former member of the U.S. House of Representatives (10 years); Colorado 24th in population (2000)
91	1899	Tom Udall (D-NM)	January 3, 2009	Former member of the U.S. House of Representatives (10 years); New Mexico 36th in population (2000)
92	1900	Mike Johanns (R-NE)	January 3, 2009	Former cabinet member
93	1901	Jeanne Shaheen (D-NH)	January 3, 2009	Former governor (6 years)
94	1902	Mark Warner (D-VA)	January 3, 2009	Former governor (4 years)
95	1903	Jim Risch (R-ID)	January 3, 2009	Former governor (7 months)
96	1904	Kay Hagan (D-NC)	January 3, 2009	North Carolina 11th in population (2000)
97	1905	Jeff Merkley (D-OR)	January 3, 2009	Oregon 28th in population (2000)
98	1906	Mark Begich (D-AK)	January 3, 2009	Alaska 48th in population (2000)
99	1907	Roland Burris (Note: In Illinois, Barack Obama (D) resigned on November 16, 2008 after elected President of the United States nearly the end of the previous Congress. He was replaced by Roland Burris (D), who was appointed by Governor Rod Blagojevich until a special election could be held to serve a successor. In that special election, Mark Kirk (R) won to finish the final weeks of Obama's term.) (D-IL)	January 12, 2009	
	1908	Ted Kaufman (D-DE)	January 15, 2009	
	1909	Michael Bennet (D-CO)	January 21, 2009	
	1910	Kirsten Gillibrand (D-NY)	January 26, 2009	
100	1911	Al Franken (Note: In Minnesota, Al Franken (D) delayed his swearing-in due to an election dispute while the previous incumbent, Norm Coleman (R), expired his term.) (D-MN)	July 7, 2009	
	1912	George LeMieux (R-FL)	September 10, 2009	
	1913	Paul G. Kirk (D-MA)	September 24, 2009	
	1914	Scott Brown (R-MA)	February 4, 2010	
	1915	Carte Goodwin (D-WV)	July 16, 2010	
	1916	Joe Manchin (D-WV)	November 15, 2010	Former governor
	1917	Chris Coons (D-DE)	November 15, 2010	
	1918	Mark Kirk (R-IL)	November 29, 2010	

The senior senators by class were Robert Byrd (D-West Virginia) from Class 1, Joe Biden (D-Delaware) from Class 2, and Daniel Inouye (D-Hawaii) from Class 3. Biden resigned on January 15, 2009, with Max Baucus (D-Montana) became the most senior senator from Class 2, Byrd died on June 28, 2010, with Richard Lugar (R-Indiana) became the most senior senator from Class 1.

== See also ==
- 111th United States Congress
- List of United States representatives in the 111th Congress
