= Chris Gibson (New York politician) =

American politician (born 1964)

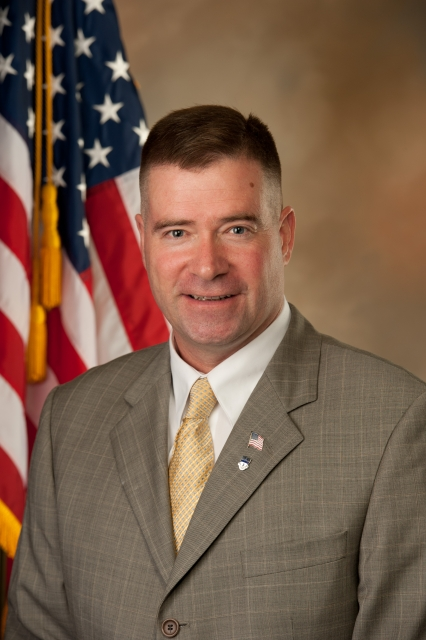

President of Siena College
- In office July 1, 2020 – May 31, 2023
- Preceded by: Ed Coughlin
- Succeeded by: Charles Seifert

Member of the U.S. House of Representatives from New York
- In office January 3, 2011 – January 3, 2017
- Preceded by: Scott Murphy
- Succeeded by: John Faso
- Constituency: 20th district (2011–2013); 19th district (2013–2017)

Personal details
- Born: Christopher Patrick Gibson; May 13, 1964 (age 62) Rockville Centre, New York, U.S.
- Party: Republican
- Spouse: Mary Jo Gibson
- Education: Siena College (BA); Cornell University (MPA, MA, PhD)

Military service
- Branch/service: United States Army
- Years of service: 1986–2010
- Rank: Colonel
- Commands: 2nd Brigade Combat Team, 82nd Airborne Division; 2nd Battalion, 325th Infantry Regiment
- Battles/wars: Persian Gulf War; Kosovo Force; Operation Iraqi Freedom
- Awards: Legion of Merit (2); Bronze Star (4); Purple Heart; Joint Service Commendation Medal; Combat Infantryman Badge with service star Master Parachutist Badge; Ranger tab

Christopher Patrick Gibson (born May 13, 1964) is an American politician, author, professor, college administrator, and former officer in the United States Army. A Republican, Gibson served as the U.S. representative for New York's 20th congressional district from 2011 to 2013 and for New York's 19th congressional district from 2013 to 2017.

A lifelong resident of Kinderhook, New York, Gibson joined the United States Army in 1986 after graduating from Siena College. He served tours in the First Gulf War, Kosovo, and Iraq, rising to the rank of colonel. He later taught American politics at West Point and was a national security affairs fellow at the Hoover Institution at Stanford University. He has received four Bronze Stars and a Purple Heart, among other awards while in the military. He also holds a Ph.D. in government from Cornell University. In 2008, he published his first book, Securing the State, which offered his overview on national security decision-making.

He retired from the United States Army in 2010 to run for Congress, defeating Democratic incumbent Scott Murphy with 55% of the vote. He was re-elected in 2012 and 2014. In January 2015, Gibson, a supporter of term limits, announced that he would not seek re-election in 2016. Originally seen as a possible candidate for governor in 2018, Gibson announced he would not run. He served as the Stanley Kaplan Distinguished Visiting Professor of American Foreign Policy at Williams College from February 2017 until 2020.

In February 2020, Siena College, Gibson’s alma mater, announced he would be the school’s 12th president becoming the first lay person to lead the Franciscan institution. He immediately went to work as President-Elect and led the college’s COVID Working Group. During his three-year tenure as President, he helped lead the college to record enrollments, balanced budgets, the successful launching of a new strategic plan, new and improved facilities, while earning various national recognitions, including being named among the “top 20” best Catholic Colleges in the U.S. (#9 for 2023) according to the source, College Consensus and listed among Conde Nast’s “50 most beautiful campuses.” He retired from that position on May 31, 2023.

In May 2025, Gibson, now a writer and analyst, published his third book, The Spirit of Philadelphia : A Call to Recover the Founding Principles.

== Early life, education, and academic career ==
Gibson was born in Rockville Centre, New York, to Robert and Barbara Gibson. His family moved to Kinderhook, south of Albany, at a young age. He attended Ichabod Crane High School there, where he was a point guard and the co-captain of the basketball team. He then attended Siena College in Loudonville, also near Albany, earning an ROTC Commission and graduating magna cum laude with a Bachelor of Arts in history.

Upon graduation from Siena, Gibson accepted an active-duty commission with the United States Army as an infantry officer. While in the Army, Gibson ultimately rose to the rank of colonel, serving seven tours including four combat tours in Iraq, Kosovo, the American Southwest in counter-narcotics interdiction, and in 2010 to Haiti after the earthquake. In Haiti, he led the 82nd Airborne Division's 2nd Brigade Combat Team during the first month of the humanitarian effort.

Throughout his career, Gibson earned a number of military decorations, including a Purple Heart, 4 Bronze Stars, 2 Legions of Merit, the Master Parachutist Badge, the Combat Infantryman's Badge with Star, and the Ranger tab. His units also received awards for their actions in Mosul in support of the first Iraqi national elections his Battalion Task Force earned the Valorous Unit Award. Later in Tal Afar, his battalion and the 3rd Armored Cavalry Regiment were recognized for excellence by the President of the United States and earned a second Valorous Unit Award.. Gibson was selected as the General George C. Marshall Award winner as the top graduate of the United States Army Command and General Staff College at Fort Leavenworth.

Gibson earned an MPA, a MA, and a Ph.D. in government, all from Cornell University. He then became a professor of American politics at the United States Military Academy at West Point. He also served as the Stanley Kaplan Distinguished Visiting Professor of American Foreign Policy at Williams College and was a National Security fellow at the Hoover Institution at Stanford University where he wrote a book on Civil-Military relations, Securing the State.

== U.S. House of Representatives ==
=== Elections ===
==== 2010 ====
External media

Images
- Gibson Campaign Flickr photostream

Video
- Gibson-Murphy debate, WMHT, October 21, 2010

Gibson challenged Democratic incumbent Scott Murphy for the 20th Congressional district seat in the House of Representatives and won on November 4, 2010.

While there were initially four candidates for the GOP nomination, the other three all dropped their bid, with one of them, Patrick Ziegler, joining Gibson's staff as his campaign manager. The uncontested Republican and Conservative candidate, Gibson outraised Murphy in his first full quarter in the campaign, and was a GOP Young Gun.

A supporter of term limits, Gibson promised to serve no more than four terms. He also called for representatives to be limited to eight years in office, with terms being extended from two years to four, which he called a "creative way" to address campaign finance reform without "impeding" free speech.

Beginning in September, Gibson saw a steady rise in polling numbers: he started behind at 37% compared to Murphy's 54%. However, by October 26, Gibson had risen to 51% and Murphy had fallen to 42%, numbers that more closely reflected the actual outcome. Newsweek described Gibson's win as a combination of running as a Republican in "perhaps the most conservative [district] in the state" (Note: The New York State Board of Elections reported that Republicans outnumbered Democrats in the district by more than 60,000 on November 1, 2010 (187,780 registered Republicans versus 126,774 registered Democrats). After redistricting in 2002, then-Congressman John E. Sweeney was quoted as saying that "no Republican can ever lose" the district.) and Murphy having supported "the two biggest items on Nancy Pelosi's agenda", regardless of the fact that "the National Journal had characterized his voting record as one of the 10 most moderate in the House".

Gibson took part in a televised debate with Murphy on October 21, presented by the local PBS station, WMHT. Gibson began the campaign at 17 points behind in the polls but ended up winning the election with 55% of the vote.

==== 2012 ====
During his first term, Gibson represented a district that stretched from the outer suburbs of New York City through the Adirondacks and outer Capital District suburbs all the way to Lake Placid. After the 2010 census, Gibson's district was renumbered as the 19th district. It lost most of its vast northern portion, including Glens Falls, Saratoga Springs and Lake Placid. To make up for the loss in population, it was shifted slightly west, absorbing some suburbs of Binghamton. Gibson defeated former federal prosecutor and Ulster County Democratic Party chairman, Julian Schreibman. Gibson was endorsed by all the major newspapers in the district, including the Albany Times Union, the Kingston Daily Freeman, the Poughkeepsie Journal, and the Oneonta Daily Star.

==== 2014 ====
Gibson was challenged by Democrat Sean Eldridge in the general election. During the campaign, he reiterated his pledge not to serve more than four terms in office. He won re-election with 62.6% of the vote to Eldridge's 34.5%. He was outspent nearly 3-to-1 by his opponent.

=== Tenure ===
After winning the election in 2010, Gibson was sworn into office in January 2011 as part of the 112th Congress. He immediately voted to repeal the Patient Protection and Affordable Care Act.

Gibson joined nearly all other Republican members of the US House of Representatives in voting to support The Path to Prosperity, the budget put forward by U.S. Representative Paul Ryan (R-WI).

The next year he joined nine other Republicans in voting against Ryan's budget, and he supported the Cooper-LaTourette Budget, loosely based on the President's Fiscal Commission Simpson Bowles and Domenici-Rivlin Debt Reduction Task Force. Gibson said he wouldn't re-sign Grover Norquist's Americans for Tax Reform Taxpayer Protection Pledge, but he remains opposed to raising tax rates. After Hurricane Irene and Tropical Storm Lee hit the 20th District in 2011, Gibson focused on getting federal aid to his constituents.

Gibson made a name for himself focusing on local issues like expanding access to broadband and better treatment of Lyme disease. He held a forum on Lyme disease in Saratoga Springs that attracted 500 people, including patients, medical experts, and environmental professionals. He has been an advocate for passage of the 2012 Farm Bill, even signing a discharge petition to bring the bill to a vote in the House.

Gibson supported reauthorization of the Violence Against Women Act.

On January 5, 2015, Gibson announced that he would not run for re-election in 2016. He said that he might run for statewide office in 2018, when the offices of governor, lieutenant governor, attorney general, comptroller and Democrat Kirsten Gillibrand's senate seat will be up for election.

On same-sex marriage, he supports equal protection of unions and believes that the decision on marriage should be left to religious institutions, protecting religious freedoms. He called on the Supreme Court to provide clarity for equal protection and religious freedom, reversing a common position of conservatives against judicial activism.

=== Committee assignments ===
Following his swearing in, Gibson became a member of the following House committees:

- Committee on Agriculture
  - Subcommittee on General Farm Commodities and Risk Management
  - Subcommittee on Livestock, Dairy, and Poultry
- Committee on Armed Services
  - Subcommittee on Readiness
  - Subcommittee on Emerging Threats and Capabilities

Gibson also later became a member of Committee on Small Business.

=== Political leanings ===
In Congress, Gibson was a member of both the conservative Republican Study Committee and the moderate Republican Main Street Partnership. Gibson was ranked as the 3rd most bipartisan member of the U.S. House of Representatives during the 114th United States Congress (and the third most bipartisan member of the U.S. House of Representatives from New York after Peter T. King and Richard L. Hanna) in the Bipartisan Index created by The Lugar Center and the McCourt School of Public Policy that ranks members of the United States Congress by their degree of bipartisanship (by measuring the frequency each member's bills attract co-sponsors from the opposite party and each member's co-sponsorship of bills by members of the opposite party).

== Personal life ==
Gibson lives in Kinderhook with his wife, Mary Jo, and their three children. The family is Roman Catholic and attends St. John's Catholic Church in Valatie.

== Written works ==
- Gibson, Chris. (2025). The Spirit of Philadelphia. ISBN 1032984309
- Gibson, Chris. (2017). Rally Point: Five Tasks to Unite the Country and Revitalize the American Dream. ISBN 9781538760574
- Gibson, Christopher P. (2008). Securing the State: Reforming the National Security Decisionmaking Process at the Civil-Military Nexus. Burlington, Vermont: Hanover Institution. ISBN 978-0-7546-7290-6.
- Gibson, Christopher P. (1998). Countervailing Forces: Enhancing Civilian Control and National Security Through Madisonian Concepts (PhD thesis). Ithaca, New York: Cornell University Press. OCLC 64748644.
- Gibson, Christopher P.; Don M. Snider (1997). "Explaining Post-Cold War Civil-Military Relations: a New Institutionalist Approach". Working Papers Series: U.S. Post-Cold War Civil-Military Relations. 08. Harvard University John M. Olin Institute for Strategic Studies. OCLC 37535789.

== Notes ==
U.S. House of Representatives
Preceded by Scott Murphy	Member of the U.S. House of Representatives from New York's 20th congressional district 2011–2013	Succeeded by Paul Tonko
Preceded by Nan Hayworth	Member of the U.S. House of Representatives from New York's 19th congressional district 2013–2017	Succeeded by John Faso
U.S. order of precedence (ceremonial)
Preceded by Bill Owens as Former U.S. Representative	Order of precedence of the United States as Former U.S. Representative	Succeeded by Chris Collins as Former U.S. Representative
