= New York's 45th State Senate district =

American legislative district

Senator
Dan Stec; R–Queensbury
- Registration: 38.0% Republican; 31.4% Democratic; 21.6% No party preference
- Demographics: 90% White; 3% Black; 3% Hispanic; 1% Asian; 1% Native American
- Population (2017): 300,058
- Registered voters: 186,214

New York's 45th State Senate district is one of 63 districts in the New York State Senate. It has been represented by Republican Dan Stec since 2021, succeeding fellow Republican Betty Little.

== Geography ==
District 45 covers a large swath of northeastern New York's North County and Capital District, including all of Clinton, Essex, Franklin, and Warren Counties, and parts of St. Lawrence County and Washington County. The district, which contains Plattsburgh and Queensbury, reaches the northernmost point in the state. With an area of over 6,800 square miles, it is both the largest State Senate district in New York and the largest state legislative district in the Northeastern United States.

The district is located in New York's 21st congressional district, and overlaps with the 107th, 113th, 114th, 115th, and 118th districts of the New York State Assembly.

== Recent election results ==
=== 2026 ===
2026 New York State Senate election, District 45
Party	Candidate	Votes	%
Republican	Dan Stec		
Conservative	Dan Stec		
Total	Dan Stec (incumbent)		
Democratic	Melissa Seale		
Working Families	Melissa Seale		
Total	Melissa Seale		
Write-in			
Total votes			

=== 2024 ===
2024 New York State Senate election, District 45
Party	Candidate	Votes	%
Republican	Dan Stec	90,514	
Conservative	Dan Stec	15,599	
Total	Dan Stec (incumbent)	106,073	99.0
Write-in		1,056	1.0
Total votes		107,129	100.0
Republican hold			

=== 2022 ===
2022 New York State Senate election, District 45
Party	Candidate	Votes	%
Republican	Dan Stec	61,820	
Conservative	Dan Stec	6,474	
Total	Dan Stec (incumbent)	68,294	60.2
Democratic	Jean Lapper	45,075	39.8
Write-in		25	0.0
Total votes		113,394	100.0
Republican hold			

=== 2020 ===
2020 New York State Senate election, District 45
Party	Candidate	Votes	%
Republican	Dan Stec	69,596	
Conservative	Dan Stec	6,330	
Independence	Dan Stec	2,210	
Total	Dan Stec	78,136	57.9
Democratic	Kimberly Davis	51,922	
Working Families	Kimberly Davis	5,006	
Total	Kimberly Davis	56,928	42.1
Write-in		54	0.0
Total votes		135,118	100.0
Republican hold			

=== 2018 ===
2018 New York State Senate election, District 45
Party	Candidate	Votes	%
Republican	Betty Little	56,669	
Conservative	Betty Little	4,945	
Independence	Betty Little	3,184	
Reform	Betty Little	472	
Total	Betty Little (incumbent)	65,270	64.4
Democratic	Emily Martz	33,876	
Working Families	Emily Martz	2,185	
Total	Emily Martz	36,061	35.6
Write-in		33	0.0
Total votes		101,364	100.0
Republican hold			

=== 2016 ===
2016 New York State Senate election, District 45
Party	Candidate	Votes	%
Republican	Betty Little	76,016	
Independence	Betty Little	8,733	
Conservative	Betty Little	7,968	
Total	Betty Little (incumbent)	92,717	88.0
Green	Stephen Ruzbacki	12,553	11.9
Write-in		70	0.1
Total votes		105,340	100.0
Republican hold			

=== 2014 ===
2014 New York State Senate election, District 45
Party	Candidate	Votes	%
Republican	Betty Little	45,936	
Independence	Betty Little	10,061	
Conservative	Betty Little	6,475	
Total	Betty Little (incumbent)	62,472	99.5
Write-in		302	0.5
Total votes		62,774	100.0
Republican hold			

=== 2012 ===
2012 New York State Senate election, District 45
Party	Candidate	Votes	%
Republican	Betty Little	66,838	
Independence	Betty Little	11,396	
Conservative	Betty Little	9,032	
Total	Betty Little (incumbent)	87,266	99.6
Write-in		358	0.4
Total votes		87,624	100.0
Republican hold			

=== Federal results in District 45 ===
Year	Office	Results
2020	President	Trump 49.94 – 48.05%
2016	President	Trump 50.1 – 43.5%
2012	President	Obama 56.3 – 42.0%
2012	Senate	Gillibrand 67.2 – 31.2%
