= Scott Murphy =

American businessman and politician (born 1970)

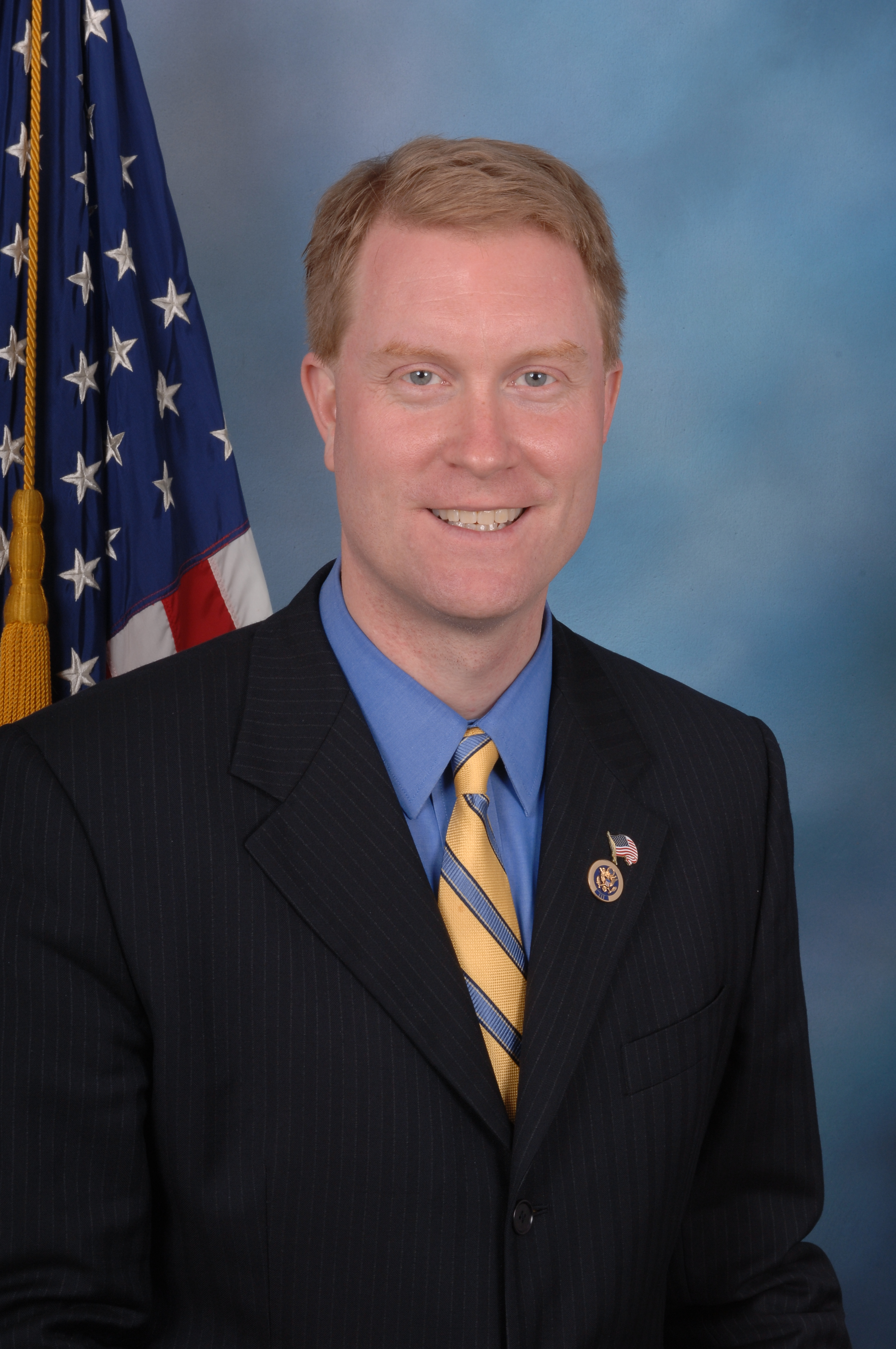
- Murphy in 2009

Member of the U.S. House of Representatives from New York's 20th district
- In office March 31, 2009 – January 3, 2011 (Note: Murphy's official service begins on the date of the special election, while he was not sworn in until April 29, 2009.)
- Preceded by: Kirsten Gillibrand
- Succeeded by: Chris Gibson

Personal details
- Born: Matthew Scott Murphy; January 26, 1970 (age 56) Columbia, Missouri, U.S.
- Party: Democratic
- Spouse: Jennifer Hogan
- Children: 3
- Education: Harvard University (BA)

Matthew Scott Murphy (born January 26, 1970) is an American entrepreneur and politician. He represented parts of New York state's Capital District (excluding the city of Albany) in the United States House of Representatives for a portion of one term from April 2009 until January 2011. He was defeated for election to a full term on November 2, 2010.

He is a member of the Democratic Party and was a member of the Blue Dog Coalition in Congress.

== Early life, education and career ==
The son of a teacher and mail carrier, Murphy graduated from the David H. Hickman High School in Columbia, Missouri, in 1988, He later graduated magna cum laude from Harvard College.

Murphy worked for Bankers Trust for two and a half years in the early 1990s before becoming an entrepreneur. In 1994, he co-founded an interactive media company, Small World Software. In 1998 the company, which had grown to 25 employees, was purchased by the internet-consulting company iXL. He then served as one of the heads of the purchased entity, rebranded "iXL New York". iXL later went bankrupt in 2002 during the end of the dot-com bubble. In 2001 Murphy joined Advantage Capital Partners, an Impact Investing Company that attempts to bring businesses, technologies and jobs to communities that have historically lacked access to investment capital.

He is a past-President of the Board of Directors of Upstate Capital Association, (fka Upstate Venture Association of New York, Inc.) He worked as an aide, Deputy Chief of Staff, and fundraiser for former Governors of Missouri Mel Carnahan and Roger B. Wilson.

== U.S. House of Representatives ==
=== 2009 special election ===
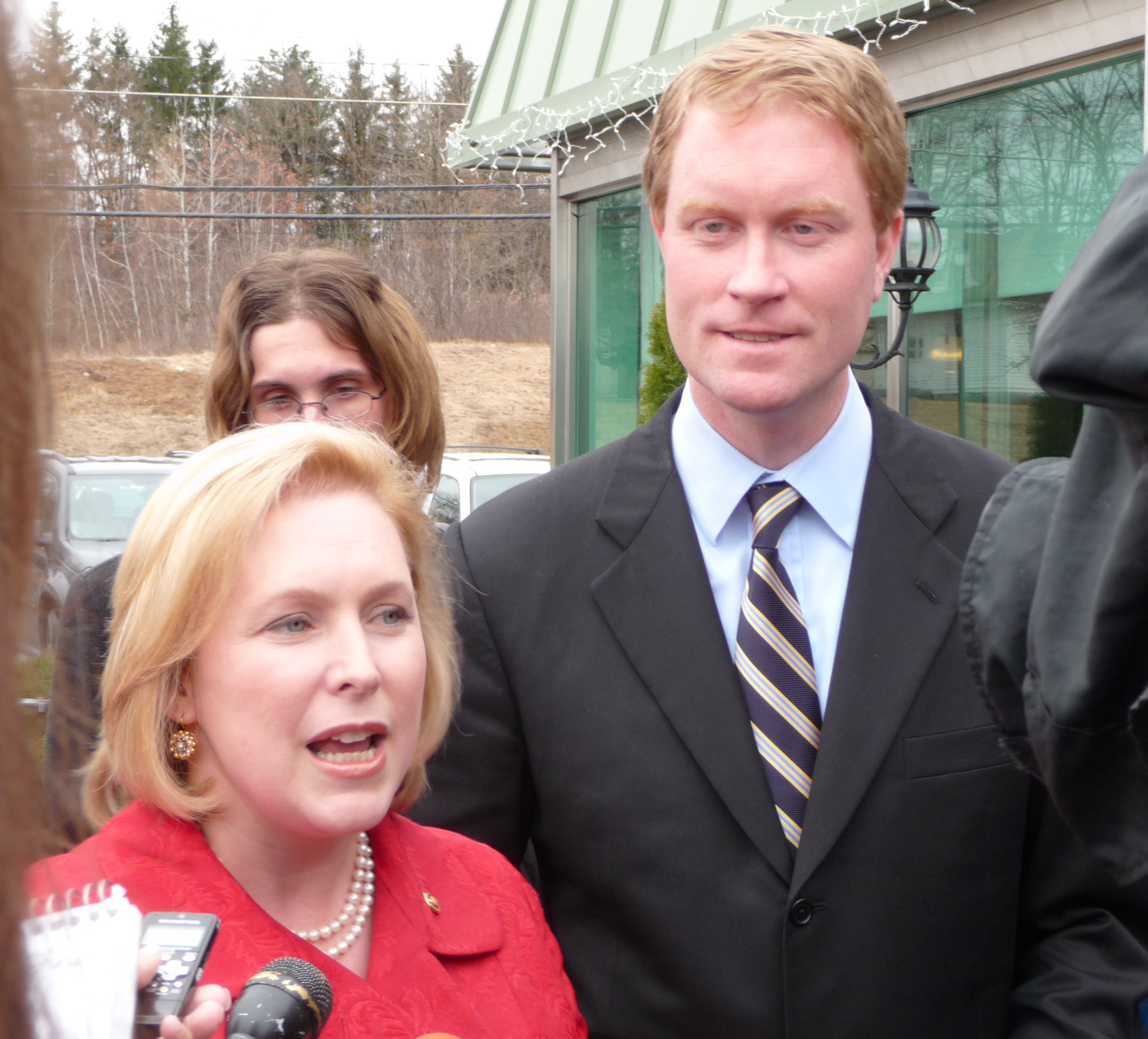
Scott Murphy and Senator Kirsten Gillibrand at a campaign stop on March 29, 2009.

On January 22, 2009, Congresswoman Kirsten Gillibrand, a Democrat representing New York's 20th congressional district, was appointed by Governor David Paterson to fill the United States Senate seat vacated by Hillary Clinton, who assumed the office of United States Secretary of State in the Obama administration.

On February 1, 2009, Murphy was chosen by a unanimous vote of ten Democratic county chairs to be their party's nominee for 2009 special election to fill Gillibrand's seat in the House.

Murphy ran against Republican nominee Jim Tedisco from Schenectady, who, until April 2009, was the Minority Leader of the New York State Assembly. Murphy was endorsed by President Barack Obama and Senator Gillibrand.

The initial count from the election had Murphy leading by approximately 60 votes out of more than 150,000 cast. However, by April 24, after re-tallies and absentee ballot counting, Murphy was ahead by 399 votes, and Tedisco conceded the election. Murphy was sworn in on April 29.

=== Tenure ===
On November 7, 2009, Murphy voted against the Affordable Health Care for America Act. Murphy opposed the Stupak Amendment, which proposed to restrict federal funding and subsidies for plans that cover elective abortion.

In March 2010, Murphy supported the Patient Protection and Affordable Care Act, known today as Obamacare.

In December 2010, Murphy voted for the Protecting Students from Sexual and Violent Predators Act, which require criminal background checks for school employees and prohibits the employment of school employees who refuse to consent to a criminal background check, make false statements in connection with one, or have been convicted of one of a list of felonies or any other crime that is a violent or sexual crime against a child. The felonies included are homicide, child abuse or neglect, rape or sexual assault, crimes against children, spousal abuse, kidnapping, arson, and physical assault, battery, or drug-related offenses, committed within the past five years.

=== Committee assignments ===
Rep. Murphy served on the same two committees as his predecessor, now-Senator Kirsten Gillibrand:

- Committee on Agriculture
  - Subcommittee on Conservation, Credit, Energy, and Research
  - Subcommittee on Horticulture and Organic Agriculture
  - Subcommittee on Livestock, Dairy, and Poultry
- Committee on Armed Services
  - Subcommittee on Terrorism and Unconventional Threats
  - Subcommittee on Strategic Forces

== Electoral history ==
New York's 20th congressional district special election, 2009
Party	Candidate	Votes	%	±%
Democratic	Scott Murphy	70,240		
Independence	Scott Murphy	6,754		
Working Families	Scott Murphy	3,839		
Total	Scott Murphy	80,833	50.23	
Republican	Jim Tedisco	68,775		
Conservative	Jim Tedisco	11,332		
Total	Jim Tedisco	80,107	49.77	
Majority		726		
Turnout		160,940		
Democratic hold		Swing	−11.9	

New York's 20th congressional district election, 2010
Party	Candidate	Votes	%
Democratic	Scott Murphy	91,577	37.42
Working Families	Scott Murphy	6,642	2.71
Independence	Scott Murphy	8,858	3.62
Totals	Scott Murphy (Incumbent)	107,077	43.75
Republican	Chris Gibson	110,813	45.28
Conservative	Chris Gibson	19,363	7.91
Total	Chris Gibson	130,176	53.19
None	Blank/Void/Write-In	7,501	3.06
Total votes		244,754	100

== Personal life ==
Murphy is married to Jennifer Hogan, a native of Washington County. They have three children, Simone, Lux and Duke. All three attend school in New York City while living part time in Glens Falls.

U.S. House of Representatives
Preceded by Kirsten Gillibrand	Member of the U.S. House of Representatives from New York's 20th congressional district 2009–2011	Succeeded by Chris Gibson
U.S. order of precedence (ceremonial)
Preceded by Eric Massa as Former U.S. Representative	Order of precedence of the United States as Former U.S. Representative	Succeeded by Bob Turner as Former U.S. Representative
