= List of new members of the 112th United States Congress =

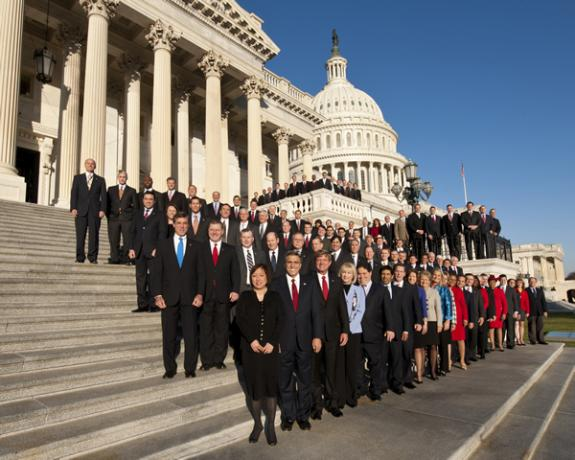
Freshman class of the House of Representatives, January 2011

The 112th United States Congress began on January 3, 2011. There were 13 new senators (one Democrat, 12 Republicans) and 94 new representatives (nine Democrats, 85 Republicans) at the start of its first session. Additionally, three senators (one Democrat, two Republicans) and 10 representatives (seven Democrats, three Republicans) took office on various dates in order to fill vacancies during the 112th Congress before it ended on January 3, 2013.

The president of the House Democratic freshman class was Terri Sewell of Alabama, while the president of the House Republican freshman class was Austin Scott of Georgia. Additionally, the Republican's freshmen liaisons were Kristi Noem of South Dakota and Tim Scott of South Carolina.

This freshmen class was overwhelmingly Republican, resulting in an even larger prevalence of Republican freshmen than during the Republican Revolution of 1994, with approximately 23% of the 47 elected Republican senators and 33% of the 242 elected Republican representatives being first-timers.

== Senate ==
=== Took office January 3, 2011 ===
State	Image	Senator	Seniority	Switched party	Prior background	Birth year	Ref
Arkansas		John Boozman (R)	5th (92nd overall)	Yes; Defeated Blanche Lincoln (D)	U.S. House of Representatives (Note: Elected to the 107th Congress, serving from 2001 to 2011 in Arkansas's 3rd district.); Rogers Public School Board; Optometrist	1950	
Connecticut		Richard Blumenthal (D)	11th (98th overall)	No; Open seat; replaced Chris Dodd (D)	Connecticut Attorney General; Connecticut State Senate; Connecticut House of Representatives; U.S. Attorney for Connecticut; U.S. Marine Corps Reserve Sergeant	1946	
Florida		Marco Rubio (R)	8th (95th overall)	No; Open seat; replaced George LeMieux (R)	Speaker of the Florida House of Representatives; West Miami City Commissioner	1971	
Indiana		Dan Coats (R)	1st (88th overall)	Yes; Open seat; replaced Evan Bayh (D)	U.S. Senate (Note: Previously appointed to the 101st Congress, serving from 1989 to 1999.); U.S. Ambassador to Germany; U.S. House of Representatives (Note: Elected to the 97th Congress, serving from 1981 to 1989 in Indiana's 4th district.); U.S. Army Staff Sergeant	1943	
Kansas		Jerry Moran (R)	3rd (90th overall)	No; Open seat; replaced Sam Brownback (R)	U.S. House of Representatives (Note: Elected to the 105th Congress, serving from 1997 to 2011 in Kansas's 1st district.); Kansas Senate	1954	
Kentucky		Rand Paul (R)	10th (97th overall)	No; Open seat; replaced Jim Bunning (R)	Ophthalmologist	1963	
Missouri		Roy Blunt (R)	2nd (89th overall)	No; Open seat; replaced Kit Bond (R)	U.S. House of Representatives (Note: Elected to the 105th Congress, serving from 1997 to 2011 in Missouri's 7th district.); President of Southwest Baptist University; Missouri Secretary of State; Greene County Clerk	1950	
New Hampshire		Kelly Ayotte (R)	13th (100th overall)	No; Open seat; replaced Judd Gregg (R)	Attorney General of New Hampshire; New Hampshire Department of Justice	1968	
North Dakota		John Hoeven (R)	7th (94th overall)	Yes; Open seat; replaced Byron Dorgan (D–NPL)	Governor of North Dakota; President of the Bank of North Dakota	1957	
Ohio		Rob Portman (R)	4th (91st overall)	No; Open seat; replaced George Voinovich (R)	Director of the Office of Management and Budget; U.S. Trade Representative; U.S. House of Representatives (Note: Elected to the 103rd Congress, serving from 1993 to 2005 in Ohio's 2nd district.); White House Director of Legislative Affairs	1955	
Pennsylvania		Pat Toomey (R)	6th (93rd overall)	Yes; Replaced Arlen Specter (D), who was defeated in a primary	President of the Club for Growth; U.S. House of Representatives (Note: Elected to the 106th Congress, serving from 1999 to 2005 in Pennsylvania's 15th district.)	1961	
Utah		Mike Lee (R)	12th (99th overall)	No; Defeated Bob Bennett (R) in a primary	Clerk for Supreme Court Justice Samuel Alito; Assistant U.S. Attorney	1971	
Wisconsin		Ron Johnson (R)	9th (96th overall)	Yes; Defeated Russ Feingold (D)	Plastics manufacturer	1955	

=== Took office during the 112th Congress ===
State	Image	Senator	Took office	Switched party	Prior background	Birth year	Ref
Nevada		Dean Heller (R)	May 9, 2011	No; Appointed; replaced John Ensign (R)	U.S. House of Representatives (Note: Elected to the 110th Congress, serving from 2007 to 2011 in Nevada's 2nd district.); Secretary of State of Nevada; Nevada Assembly	1960	
Hawaii		Brian Schatz (D)	December 26, 2012	No; Appointed; replaced Daniel Inouye (D)	Lieutenant Governor of Hawaii; Chair of the Democratic Party of Hawaii; Hawaii House of Representatives	1972	
South Carolina		Tim Scott (R)	January 2, 2013	No; Appointed; replaced Jim DeMint (R)	U.S. House of Representatives (Note: Elected to the 112th Congress, serving from 2011 to 2013 in South Carolina's 1st district.); South Carolina House of Representatives; Charleston County Council	1965	

== House of Representatives ==
=== Took office January 3, 2011 ===
District	Image	Representative	Switched party	Prior background	Birth year	Ref
Alabama 2		Martha Roby (R)	Yes; Defeated Bobby Bright (D)	Montgomery City Council	1976	
Alabama 5		Mo Brooks (R)	No; Defeated Parker Griffith (R) in a primary	Madison County Commission; Madison County District Attorney; Alabama House of Representatives	1954	
Alabama 7		Terri Sewell (D)	No; Open seat; replaced Artur Davis (D)	Lawyer	1965	
Arizona 1		Paul Gosar (R)	Yes; Defeated Ann Kirkpatrick (D)	Dentist	1958	
Arizona 3		Ben Quayle (R)	No; Open seat; replaced John Shadegg (R)	Lawyer	1976	
Arizona 5		David Schweikert (R)	Yes; Defeated Harry Mitchell (D)	Maricopa County Treasurer; Arizona House of Representatives	1962	
Arkansas 1		Rick Crawford (R)	Yes; Open seat; replaced Marion Berry (D)	Radio announcer U.S. Army Sergeant	1966	
Arkansas 2		Tim Griffin (R)	Yes; Open seat; replaced Vic Snyder (D)	U.S. Attorney for Eastern Arkansas; U.S. Army Reserve Colonel	1968	
Arkansas 3		Steve Womack (R)	No; Open seat; replaced John Boozman (R)	Mayor of Rogers; Rogers City Council; Arkansas National Guard Colonel	1957	
California 19		Jeff Denham (R)	No; Open seat; replaced George Radanovich (R)	California State Senate; U.S. Air Force Reserve Staff Sergeant	1967	
California 33		Karen Bass (D)	No; Open seat; replaced Diane Watson (D)	Speaker of the California State Assembly	1953	
Colorado 3		Scott Tipton (R)	Yes; Defeated John Salazar (D)	Colorado House of Representatives	1956	
Colorado 4		Cory Gardner (R)	Yes; Defeated Betsy Markey (D)	Colorado House of Representatives	1974	
Delaware at-large		John Carney (D)	Yes; Open seat; replaced Mike Castle (R)	Lieutenant Governor of Delaware	1956	
Florida 2		Steve Southerland (R)	Yes; Defeated Allen Boyd (R)	Mortician	1965	
Florida 5		Rich Nugent (R)	No; Open seat; replaced Ginny Brown-Waite (R)	Hernando County Sheriff; Illinois Air National Guard	1951	
Florida 8		Daniel Webster (R)	Yes; Defeated Alan Grayson (D)	Florida Senate; Speaker of the Florida House of Representatives	1949	
Florida 12		Dennis Ross (R)	No; Open seat; replaced Adam Putnam (R)	Florida House of Representatives	1959	
Florida 17		Frederica Wilson (D)	No; Open seat; replaced Kendrick Meek (D)	Florida Senate; Florida House of Representatives; Miami-Dade County School Board	1942	
Florida 22		Allen West (R)	Yes; Defeated Ron Klein (D)	Civilian advisor to the Afghan National Army; U.S. Army Lieutenant Colonel	1961	
Florida 24		Sandy Adams (R)	Yes; Defeated Suzanne Kosmas (D)	Florida House of Representatives; Orange County Sheriff's Office; U.S. Air Force	1956	
Florida 25		David Rivera (R)	New seat	Florida House of Representatives	1965	
Georgia 7		Rob Woodall (R)	No; Open seat; replaced John Linder (R)	Attorney	1970	
Georgia 8		Austin Scott (R)	Yes; Defeated Jim Marshall (D)	Georgia House of Representatives	1969	
Hawaii 1		Colleen Hanabusa (D)	Yes; Defeated Charles Djou (R)	President of the Hawaii Senate	1951	
Idaho 1		Raúl Labrador (R)	Yes; Defeated Walt Minnick (D)	Idaho House of Representatives	1967	
Illinois 8		Joe Walsh (R)	Yes; Defeated Melissa Bean (D)	Business executive	1961	
Illinois 10		Bob Dold (R)	No; Open seat; replaced Mark Kirk (R)	Staffer for Vice President Dan Quayle	1969	
Illinois 11		Adam Kinzinger (R)	Yes; Defeated Debbie Halvorson (D)	McLean County Board; U.S. Air Force Lieutenant Colonel	1978	
Illinois 14		Randy Hultgren (R)	Yes; Defeated Bill Foster (D)	Illinois Senate; Illinois House of Representatives; DuPage County Board	1966	
Illinois 17		Bobby Schilling (R)	Yes; Defeated Phil Hare (D)	Business owner	1964	
Indiana 4		Todd Rokita (R)	No; Open seat; replaced Steve Buyer (R)	Secretary of State of Indiana	1970	
Indiana 8		Larry Bucshon (R)	Yes; Open seat; replaced Brad Ellsworth (D)	Cardiothoracic surgeon U.S. Navy Reserve	1962	
Indiana 9		Todd Young (R)	Yes; Defeated Baron Hill (D)	Orange County assistant deputy prosecutor U.S. Marine Corps Captain	1972	
Kansas 1		Tim Huelskamp (R)	No; Open seat; replaced Jerry Moran (R)	Kansas Senate	1968	
Kansas 3		Kevin Yoder (R)	Yes; Open seat; replaced Dennis Moore (D)	Kansas House of Representatives	1976	
Kansas 4		Mike Pompeo (R)	No; Open seat; replaced Todd Tiahrt (R)	Aerospace manufacturing entrepreneur U.S. Army Captain	1963	
Louisiana 2		Cedric Richmond (D)	Yes; Defeated Joseph Cao (R)	Louisiana House of Representatives	1973	
Louisiana 3		Jeff Landry (R)	Yes; Open seat; replaced Charlie Melançon (D)	St. Martin Parish Sheriff's Office; Louisiana National Guard Sergeant	1970	
Maryland 1		Andy Harris (R)	Yes; Defeated Frank Kratovil (D)	Maryland Senate; U.S. Navy Medical Corps	1957	
Massachusetts 10		Bill Keating (D)	No; Open seat; replaced Bill Delahunt (D)	Norfolk County District Attorney; Massachusetts Senate; Massachusetts House of Representatives	1952	
Michigan 1		Dan Benishek (R)	Yes; Open seat; replaced Bart Stupak (D)	Physician	1952	
Michigan 2		Bill Huizenga (R)	No; Open seat; replaced Pete Hoekstra (R)	Michigan House of Representatives	1969	
Michigan 3		Justin Amash (R)	No (Note: Amash became an independent in July 2019, then joined the Libertarian Party in April 2020, all during the 116th Congress.); Open seat; replaced Vern Ehlers (R)	Michigan House of Representatives	1980	
Michigan 7		Tim Walberg (R)	Yes; Defeated Mark Schauer (D)	U.S. House of Representatives (Note: Previously elected to the 110th Congress, serving from 2007 to 2009.); Michigan House of Representatives	1951	
Michigan 13		Hansen Clarke (D)	No; Defeated Carolyn Cheeks Kilpatrick (D) in a primary	Michigan Senate; Michigan House of Representatives	1957	
Minnesota 8		Chip Cravaack (R)	Yes; Defeated Jim Oberstar (DFL)	Commercial airline pilot U.S. Navy Reserve Captain	1959	
Mississippi 1		Alan Nunnelee (R)	Yes; Defeated Travis Childers (D)	Mississippi State Senate	1958	
Mississippi 4		Steven Palazzo (R)	Yes; Defeated Gene Taylor (D)	Mississippi House of Representatives; Mississippi National Guard Sergeant	1970	
Missouri 4		Vicky Hartzler (R)	Yes; Defeated Ike Skelton (D)	Missouri House of Representatives	1960	
Missouri 7		Billy Long (R)	No; Open seat; replaced Roy Blunt (R)	Auctioneer business owner	1955	
Nevada 3		Joe Heck (R)	Yes; Defeated Dina Titus (D)	Nevada Senate; Physician; U.S. Army Reserve Brigadier General	1961	
New Hampshire 1		Frank Guinta (R)	Yes; Defeated Carol Shea-Porter (D)	Mayor of Manchester; Manchester Board of Aldermen; New Hampshire House of Representatives	1970	
New Hampshire 2		Charles Bass (R)	Yes; Open seat; replaced Paul Hodes (D)	U.S. House of Representatives (Note: Previously elected to the 104th Congress, serving from 1995 to 2007.); New Hampshire Senate	1952	
New Jersey 3		Jon Runyan (R)	Yes; Defeated John Adler (D)	Professional football player	1973	
New Mexico 2		Steve Pearce (R)	Yes; Defeated Harry Teague (D)	U.S. House of Representatives (Note: Previously elected to the 108th Congress, serving from 2003 to 2009.); New Mexico House of Representatives; U.S. Air Force Captain	1947	
New York 13		Michael Grimm (R)	Yes; Defeated Michael McMahon (D)	Federal Bureau of Investigation; U.S. Marine Corps Reserve Corporal	1970	
New York 19		Nan Hayworth (R)	Yes; Defeated John Hall (D)	Ophthalmologist	1959	
New York 20		Chris Gibson (R)	Yes; Defeated Scott Murphy (D)	College administrator U.S. Army Colonel	1964	
New York 24		Richard Hanna (R)	Yes; Defeated Mike Arcuri (D)	Business owner	1951	
New York 25		Ann Marie Buerkle (R)	Yes; Defeated Dan Maffei (D)	Assistant New York Attorney General; Syracuse Common Council; Registered nurse	1951	
North Carolina 2		Renee Ellmers (R)	Yes; Defeated Bob Etheridge (D)	Dunn Planning Board; Registered nurse	1964	
North Dakota at-large		Rick Berg (R)	Yes; Defeated Earl Pomeroy (D–NPL)	Speaker of the North Dakota House of Representatives	1959	
Ohio 1		Steve Chabot (R)	Yes; Defeated Steve Driehaus (D)	U.S. House of Representatives (Note: Previously elected to the 104th Congress, serving from 1999 to 2009.); Hamilton County Board of Commissioners; Cincinnati City Council	1953	
Ohio 6		Bill Johnson (R)	Yes; Defeated Charlie Wilson (D)	Corporate executive U.S. Air Force Lieutenant Colonel	1954	
Ohio 15		Steve Stivers (R}	Yes; Defeated Mary Jo Kilroy (D)	Ohio Senate; Ohio National Guard Brigadier General	1965	
Ohio 16		Jim Renacci (R)	Yes; Defeated John Boccieri (D)	Mayor of Wadsworth; Wadsworth City Council	1958	
Ohio 18		Bob Gibbs (R)	Yes; Defeated Zack Space (D)	Ohio Senate; Ohio House of Representatives; President of the Ohio Farm Bureau Federation	1954	
Oklahoma 5		James Lankford (R)	No; Open seat; replaced Mary Fallin (R)	Baptist General Convention of Oklahoma	1968	
Pennsylvania 3		Mike Kelly (R)	Yes; Defeated Kathy Dahlkemper (D)	Butler County Council; Butler School Board	1948	
Pennsylvania 7		Pat Meehan (R)	Yes; Open seat; replaced Joe Sestak (D)	U.S. Attorney for Eastern Pennsylvania; Delaware County District Attorney	1955	
Pennsylvania 8		Mike Fitzpatrick (R)	Yes; Defeated Patrick Murphy (D)	U.S. House of Representatives (Note: Previously elected to the 109th Congress, serving from 2005 to 2007.); Bucks County Board of Commissioners	1963	
Pennsylvania 10		Tom Marino (R)	Yes; Defeated Chris Carney (D)	U.S. Attorney for Middle Pennsylvania; Lycoming County District Attorney	1952	
Pennsylvania 11		Lou Barletta (R)	Yes; Defeated Paul Kanjorski (D)	Mayor of Hazleton; Hazleton City Council	1956	
Rhode Island 1		David Cicilline (D)	No; Open seat; replaced Patrick J. Kennedy (D)	Mayor of Providence; Rhode Island House of Representatives	1961	
South Carolina 1		Tim Scott (R)	No; Open seat; replaced Henry Brown (R)	South Carolina House of Representatives; Charleston County Council	1965	
South Carolina 3		Jeff Duncan (R)	No; Open seat; replaced Gresham Barrett (R)	South Carolina House of Representatives	1966	
South Carolina 4		Trey Gowdy (R)	No; Defeated Bob Inglis (R) in a primary	South Carolina Circuit Court Solicitor; Assistant U.S. Attorney	1964	
South Carolina 5		Mick Mulvaney (R)	Yes; Defeated John Spratt (D)	South Carolina Senate; South Carolina House of Representatives	1967	
South Dakota at-large		Kristi Noem (R)	Yes; Defeated Stephanie Herseth Sandlin (D)	South Dakota House of Representatives	1971	
Tennessee 3		Chuck Fleischmann (R)	No; Open seat; replaced Zach Wamp (R)	Lawyer	1962	
Tennessee 4		Scott DesJarlais (R)	Yes; Defeated Lincoln Davis (D)	Physician	1964	
Tennessee 6		Diane Black (R)	Yes; Open seat; replaced Bart Gordon (D)	Tennessee Senate; Tennessee House of Representatives; Registered nurse	1951	
Tennessee 8		Stephen Fincher (R)	Yes; Open seat; replaced John Tanner (D)	Farming business owner	1973	
Texas 17		Bill Flores (R)	Yes; Defeated Chet Edwards (D)	Texas Real Estate Commission; Energy company executive	1954	
Texas 23		Quico Canseco (R)	Yes; Defeated Ciro Rodriguez (D)	Bank executive	1949	
Texas 27		Blake Farenthold (R)	Yes; Defeated Solomon Ortiz (D)	Lawyer	1961	
Virginia 2		Scott Rigell (R)	Yes; Defeated Glenn Nye (D)	Car dealership owner U.S. Marine Corps Reserve Sergeant	1960	
Virginia 5		Robert Hurt (R)	Yes; Defeated Tom Perriello (D)	Virginia Senate; Virginia House of Delegates; Chatham Town Council	1969	
Virginia 9		Morgan Griffith (R)	Yes; Defeated Rick Boucher (D)	Virginia House of Delegates	1958	
Washington 3		Jaime Herrera (R)	Yes; Open seat; replaced Brian Baird (D)	Washington House of Representatives; Congressional staffer	1978	
West Virginia 1		David McKinley (R)	Yes; Replaced Alan Mollohan (D), who was defeated in a primary	Chair of the West Virginia Republican Party; West Virginia House of Delegates	1947	
Wisconsin 7		Sean Duffy (R)	Yes; Open seat; replaced Dave Obey (D)	Ashland County District Attorney; Reality television personality	1971	
Wisconsin 8		Reid Ribble (R)	Yes; Defeated Steve Kagen (D)	Business owner	1956	

=== Took office during the 112th Congress ===
District	Image	Representative	Took office	Switched party	Prior background	Birth year	Ref
New York 26		Kathy Hochul (D)	June 1, 2011	Yes; Succeeded Chris Lee (R)	Erie County Clerk; Hamburg Town Board; Congressional staffer	1958	
California 36		Janice Hahn (D)	July 19, 2011	No; Succeeded Jane Harman (D)	Los Angeles City Council; Los Angeles Charter Reform Commission	1952	
Nevada 2		Mark Amodei (R)	September 15, 2011	No; Succeeded Dean Heller (R)	Chair of the Nevada Republican Party; Nevada Senate; Nevada Assembly; U.S. Army Judge Advocate General's Corps	1958	
New York 9		Bob Turner (R)	September 15, 2011	Yes; Succeeded Anthony Weiner (D)	Businessman; U.S. Army Specialist	1941	
Oregon 1		Suzanne Bonamici (D)	February 7, 2012	No; Succeeded David Wu (D)	Oregon State Senate; Oregon House of Representatives	1954	
Arizona 8		Ron Barber (D)	June 19, 2012	No; Succeeded Gabby Giffords (D)	Staff for U.S. Representative Gabby Giffords	1945	
Kentucky 4		Thomas Massie (R)	November 13, 2012	No; Succeeded Geoff Davis (R)	Lewis County Judge/Executive	1971	
Michigan 11		David Curson (D)	November 13, 2012	Yes; Succeeded Thaddeus McCotter (R)	Union representative U.S. Marine Corps	1948	
Washington 1		Suzan DelBene (D)	November 13, 2012	No; Succeeded Jay Inslee (D)	Washington Director of Revenue; Technology business executive	1962	
New Jersey 10		Donald Payne Jr. (D)	November 15, 2012	No; Succeeded Donald M. Payne (D)	President of the Municipal Council of Newark; Essex County Board of Chosen Freeholders; New Jersey Highway Authority	1958	

== See also ==
- List of United States representatives in the 112th Congress
- List of United States senators in the 112th Congress

== Notes ==
Preceded by New members of the 111th Congress	New members of the 112th Congress; 2011–2013	Succeeded by New members of the 113th Congress
