= MPs first elected in 2010 to the 55th UK Parliament =

The fifty-fifth Parliament of the United Kingdom was the legislature of the United Kingdom following the 2010 general election of members of parliament (MPs) to the House of Commons. Parliament, which consists of the House of Lords and the elected House of Commons, was convened on 25 May 2010 at the Palace of Westminster by Queen Elizabeth II. It was dissolved on 30 March 2015, being 25 working days ahead of the 2015 general election on 7 May 2015.

The election saw each of Parliament's 650 constituencies return one MP to the House of Commons. The Conservative Party, led by David Cameron, became the single largest party, though without an overall majority. This resulted in a hung parliament. A coalition agreement was then formed following negotiations with Liberal Democrats and their leader Nick Clegg. John Bercow resumed his role as Speaker of the House of Commons. In September 2010, Ed Miliband won a Labour Party leadership vote to succeed Gordon Brown as permanent Leader of the Opposition.

== House of Commons composition ==
This is a graphical representation of the House of Commons showing a comparison of party strengths as it was directly after the 2010 general election:

1. The Scottish National Party and Plaid Cymru sit together as a party group.
2. Sinn Féin has not taken its seats.
3. This is not the official seating plan of the House of Commons, which has five rows of benches on each side, with the government party to the right of the speaker and opposition parties to the left, but with room for only around two-thirds of MPs to sit at any one time.

This table shows the number of MPs in each party:

| Affiliation | Members | |
| Affiliation | After 2010 general election | At dissolution of Parliament |
|---|---|---|
| Conservative | 306 | 302 |
| Labour | 258 | 256 |
| Liberal Democrats | 57 | 56 |
| DUP | 8 | 8 |
| SNP | 6 | 6 |
| Independent | 1 | 5 |
| Sinn Féin | 5 | 5 |
| Plaid Cymru | 3 | 3 |
| SDLP | 3 | 3 |
| UKIP | 0 | 2 |
| Alliance | 1 | 1 |
| Green | 1 | 1 |
| Respect | 0 | 1 |
| Speaker | 1 | 1 |
| Total number of seats | 650 | 650 |
| Actual government majority | 83 | 73 |

Notes

- See here for a full list of changes during the fifty-fifth Parliament.
- The actual government majority is calculated as Conservative and Liberal Democrat MPs less all other parties. This calculation excludes the Speaker, Deputy Speakers (two Labour and one Conservative) and Sinn Féin.

== List of MPs first elected in the 2010 general election ==
The following table is a list of MPs who were first elected in 2010, ordered by constituency.

| Constituency | Party of incumbent before election | Member elected | Profession before election | Birth year |
|---|---|---|---|---|
| Aberconwy | Labour | Guto Bebb (C) | Business Development Director of Innovas Wales | 1968 |
| Airdrie and Shotts | Labour | Pamela Nash (L) | Parliamentary Assistant to John Reid MP | 1984 |
| Amber Valley | Labour | Nigel Mills (C) | Chartered Accountant for PricewaterhouseCoopers | 1974 |
| Ashfield | Labour | Gloria De Piero (L) | Newsreader for GMTV | 1972 |
| Banff and Buchan | SNP | Eilidh Whiteford (SNP) | Scottish Campaigns Manager for Oxfam | 1969 |
| Barrow and Furness | Labour | John Woodcock (L) | Special Advisor to Gordon Brown MP | 1978 |
| Battersea | Labour | Jane Ellison (C) | Director of John Lewis Magazine 'Edition' | 1964 |
| Beckenham | Conservative | Bob Stewart DSO (C) | Chief of Policy at Supreme Headquarters Allied Powers Europe, Commander of United Nations forces in Bosnia during Operation Grapple & retired Colonel in the Cheshire Regiment | 1949 |
| Bedford | Labour | Richard Fuller (C) | Management Consultant for L.E.K. Consulting | 1962 |
| Belfast East | DUP | Naomi Long (APNI) | Member of the Northern Ireland Assembly for Belfast East | 1971 |
| Bethnal Green and Bow | Respect | Rushanara Ali (L) | Associate Director of the Young Foundation | 1975 |
| Birmingham, Erdington | Labour | Jack Dromey (L) | Deputy General Secretary of Unite | 1948 |
| Birmingham, Ladywood | Labour | Shabana Mahmood (L) | Barrister | 1980 |
| Blackpool North and Cleveleys | Labour | Paul Maynard (C) | Special Advisor to Dr. Liam Fox MP | 1975 |
| Blaenau Gwent | BGPV | Nick Smith (L) | Director of Policy and Partnerships at the Royal College of Speech and Language Therapists | 1960 |
| Bolton South East | Labour | Yasmin Qureshi (L) | Barrister | 1963 |
| Bolton West | Labour | Julie Hilling (L) | Trade Union Regional Organiser for the Transport Salaried Staffs' Association | 1955 |
| Bournemouth West | Conservative | Conor Burns (C) | Associate Director for PLMR | 1972 |
| Bracknell | Conservative | Dr. Phillip Lee (C) | Doctor | 1970 |
| Brentford and Isleworth | Labour | Mary Macleod (C) | Group Communications Head of Transition at Royal Bank of Scotland & Policy Advisor to The Queen and the Royal Household at Buckingham Palace | 1969 |
| Brigg and Goole | Labour | Andrew Percy (C) | Teacher & Councillor for Hull City Council | 1977 |
| Brighton, Kemptown | Labour | Simon Kirby (C) | Owner of C-Side & Councillor for East Sussex County Council | 1964 |
| Brighton, Pavilion | Labour | Caroline Lucas (G) | Leader of the Green Party of England and Wales | 1960 |
| Bristol North West | Labour | Charlotte Leslie (C) | Editor of 'Crossbow' | 1978 |
| Bromsgrove | Conservative | Sajid Javid (C) | Head of Deutsche Bank's Asia Global Credit Trading | 1969 |
| Broxtowe | Labour | Anna Soubry (C) | Barrister & Newsreader for This Morning | 1956 |
| Burnley | Labour | Gordon Birtwistle (LD) | Owner of P&J Engineering Supplies | 1943 |
| Burton | Labour | Andrew Griffiths (C) | Chief of Staff to Eric Pickles MP | 1970 |
| Bury North | Labour | David Nuttall (C) | Notary Public | 1962 |
| Calder Valley | Labour | Craig Whittaker (C) | Retail general manager for PC World & Councillor for Calderdale Borough Council | 1962 |
| Camborne and Redruth | Liberal Democrats | George Eustice (C) | Associate Director of Portland Communications | 1971 |
| Cambridge | Liberal Democrats | Dr. Julian Huppert (LD) | Biologist & Councillor for Cambridgeshire County Council | 1978 |
| Cannock Chase | Labour | Aidan Burley (C) | Management Consultant for Mouchel & Councillor for Hammersmith and Fulham London Borough Council | 1979 |
| Cardiff North | Labour | Jonathan Evans (C) | Former MEP for Wales & former MP for Brecon and Radnorshire | 1950 |
| Carlisle | Labour | John Stevenson (C) | Solicitor & Councillor for Carlisle City Council | 1963 |
| Carmarthen East and Dinefwr | Plaid Cymru | Jonathan Edwards (PC) | Chief of Staff to Adam Price MP | 1968 |
| Carmarthen West and South Pembrokeshire | Labour | Simon Hart (C) | Chief Executive of the Countryside Alliance & retired Captain in the Royal Gloucestershire Hussars | 1963 |
| Castle Point | Conservative | Rebecca Harris (C) | Marketing Director of Phillimore & Co. Publishers | 1967 |
| Central Devon | Conservative | Mel Stride (C) | Businessman | 1961 |
| Central Suffolk and North Ipswich | Conservative | Dan Poulter (C) | Doctor | 1978 |
| Chatham and Aylesford | Labour | Tracey Crouch (C) | Head of Public Affairs for Aviva | 1975 |
| City of Chester | Labour | Stephen Mosley (C) | IT Consultant & Councillor for Chester City Council | 1972 |
| Chesterfield | Liberal Democrats | Toby Perkins (L) | Owner of ClubRugby & Councillor for Chesterfield Borough Council | 1970 |
| Chippenham | Liberal Democrats | Duncan Hames (LD) | Chartered Accountant for Deloitte | 1977 |
| Cleethorpes | Labour | Martin Vickers (C) | Constituency Agent to Edward Leigh MP & Councillor for North East Lincolnshire Council | 1950 |
| Clwyd South | Labour | Susan Elan Jones (L) | Charity Fundraiser | 1968 |
| Colne Valley | Labour | Jason McCartney (C) | Newsreader for ITV's Calendar News & retired Flight Lieutenant in the Royal Air Force | 1968 |
| Congleton | Conservative | Fiona Bruce (C) | Solicitor & Councillor for Warrington Borough Council | 1957 |
| Corby | Labour | Louise Bagshawe (C) | Novelist | 1971 |
| Crawley | Labour | Henry Smith (C) | Leader of West Sussex County Council | 1969 |
| Croydon Central | Labour | Gavin Barwell (C) | Management Consultant & Councillor for Croydon Borough Council | 1972 |
| Cumbernauld, Kilsyth and Kirkintilloch East | Labour | Gregg McClymont (L) | Tutor at St Hugh's College, Oxford | 1976 |
| Darlington | Labour | Jenny Chapman (L) | Parliamentary Assistant to Alan Milburn MP & Councillor for Darlington Borough Council | 1973 |
| Dartford | Labour | Gareth Johnson (C) | Solicitor | 1969 |
| Derby North | Labour | Thomas Docherty (L) | Leader of Derby City Council | 1956 |
| Devizes | Conservative | Claire Perry (C) | Political Advisor to George Osborne MP | 1964 |
| Dewsbury | Labour | Simon Reevell (C) | Barrister | 1966 |
| Dover | Labour | Charlie Elphicke (C) | Solicitor | 1971 |
| Dudley South | Labour | Chris Kelly (C) | Marketing Director of Keltruck Ltd | 1978 |
| Dunfermline and West Fife | Labour | Thomas Docherty (L) | Account Director of Communications Company | 1975 |
| Ealing Central and Acton | Labour | Angie Bray (C) | Former London Assembly Member for West Central | 1953 |
| Easington | Labour | Grahame Morris (L) | Researcher for John Cummings & Councillor for Easington District Council | 1961 |
| East Hampshire | Conservative | Damian Hinds (C) | Barrister | 1969 |
| East Kilbride, Strathaven and Lesmahagow | Labour | Michael McCann (L) | Trade Union Official to Public and Commercial Services Union & Councillor for South Lanarkshire Council | 1964 |
| East Lothian | Labour | Fiona O'Donnell (L) | Development Officer for the Labour Party | 1960 |
| East Surrey | Conservative | Sam Gyimah (C) | Investment Banker for Goldman Sachs & Chairman of the Bow Group | 1976 |
| Eastbourne | Conservative | Stephen Lloyd (LD) | Business Development Consultant for Federation of Small Businesses | 1957 |
| Edinburgh South | Labour | Ian Murray (L) | Owner of 100 mph Events Ltd & Councillor for Edinburgh City Council | 1976 |
| Elmet and Rothwell | Labour | Alec Shelbrooke (C) | Project Manager for the University of Leeds & Councillor for Leeds City Council | 1976 |
| Enfield North | Labour | Nick de Bois (C) | managing director for Rapier Design Ltd | 1959 |
| Erewash | Labour | Jessica Lee (C) | Barrister | 1976 |
| Erith and Thamesmead | Labour | Teresa Pearce (L) | Senior Manager for PricewaterhouseCoopers | 1955 |
| Esher and Walton | Conservative | Dominic Raab (C) | Barrister for the British Embassy in The Hague & Chief of Staff for David Davis MP & Dominic Grieve MP | 1974 |
| Filton and Bradley Stoke | Conservative | Jack Lopresti (C) | Management Consultant & Trooper in the Royal Gloucestershire Hussars | 1969 |
| Finchley and Golders Green | Conservative | Mike Freer (C) | Relationship Director for Barclays Bank & Leader of Barnet Borough Council | 1960 |
| Folkestone and Hythe | Conservative | Damian Collins (C) | Senior Counsel to Lexington Communications | 1974 |
| Gillingham and Rainham | Labour | Rehman Chishti (C) | Political Adviser to Benazir Bhutto, former Prime Minister of Pakistan & Councillor for Medway Council | 1978 |
| Glasgow Central | Labour | Anas Sarwar (L) | Dentist | 1983 |
| Glasgow East | Labour | Margaret Curran (L) | Member of the Scottish Parliament for Glasgow Baillieston | 1958 |
| Gloucester | Labour | Richard Graham (C) | British Trade Commissioner to China & Hong Kong, Consul for Macau & Director of Baring Asset Management | 1958 |
| Gosport | Conservative | Caroline Dinenage (C) | Director of Dinenages Ltd | 1971 |
| Grantham and Stamford | Conservative | Nicholas Boles (C) | Director of Policy Exchange | 1965 |
| Great Yarmouth | Labour | Brandon Lewis (C) | Barrister & Leader of Brentwood Borough Council | 1971 |
| Halesowen and Rowley Regis | Labour | James Morris (C) | Owner of a Computer Software company | 1967 |
| Harlow | Labour | Robert Halfon (C) | Political Director for Conservative Friends of Israel | 1969 |
| Harrogate and Knaresborough | Liberal Democrats | Andrew Jones (C) | Marketing Director for Bettys and Taylors of Harrogate | 1963 |
| Harrow East | Labour | Bob Blackman (C) | Former London Assembly Member for Brent and Harrow & Regulatory Compliance Manager for BT Group | 1956 |
| Hastings and Rye | Labour | Amber Rudd (C) | Owner of Lawnstone Ltd | 1963 |
| Hendon | Labour | Dr. Matthew Offord (C) | Political Analyst for the BBC & Councillor for Barnet Borough Council | 1969 |
| Hereford and South Herefordshire | Liberal Democrats | Jesse Norman (C) | Lecturer of Philosophy at University College London and Birkbeck, University of London & Author | 1962 |
| Hexham | Conservative | Guy Opperman (C) | Barrister | 1965 |
| High Peak | Labour | Andrew Bingham (C) | Businessman & Councillor for High Peak Borough Council | 1962 |
| Houghton and Sunderland South | Labour | Bridget Phillipson (L) | Manager for the Wearside Women in Need charity | 1983 |
| Hove | Labour | Mike Weatherley (C) | Chartered Accountant | 1957 |
| Ipswich | Labour | The Hon. Ben Gummer (C) | managing director of Sancroft International | 1978 |
| Islwyn | Labour | Chris Evans (L) | Parliamentary Researcher to Don Touhig MP | 1976 |
| Keighley | Labour | Kris Hopkins (C) | Leader of Bradford Council & retired Private in the Duke of Wellington's Regiment. | 1963 |
| Kilmarnock and Loudoun | Labour | Cathy Jamieson (L) | Member of the Scottish Parliament for Carrick, Cumnock and Doon Valley | 1956 |
| Kingston upon Hull East | Labour | Karl Turner (L) | Barrister | 1971 |
| Kingswood | Labour | Chris Skidmore (C) | Author & Historian | 1981 |
| Lancaster and Fleetwood | Labour | Eric Ollerenshaw OBE (C) | Former London Assembly Member for London Wide | 1950 |
| Leeds West | Labour | Rachel Reeves (L) | Economist for HBOS | 1979 |
| Leicester West | Labour | Liz Kendall (L) | Director of the Ambulance Services Network | 1971 |
| Lewisham East | Labour | Heidi Alexander (L) | Councillor for Lewisham London Borough Council | 1975 |
| Leyton and Wanstead | Labour | John Cryer (L) | Former MP for Hornchurch | 1964 |
| Lincoln | Labour | Karl McCartney (C) | Businessman & Magistrate | 1968 |
| Liverpool, Walton | Labour | Steve Rotheram (L) | Councillor for Liverpool City Council | 1961 |
| Liverpool, Wavertree | Labour | Luciana Berger (L) | Charity Worker | 1981 |
| Liverpool, West Derby | Labour | Stephen Twigg (L) | Former MP for Enfield Southgate | 1966 |
| Livingston | Labour | Graeme Morrice (L) | Leader of West Lothian Council | 1959 |
| Loughborough | Labour | Nicky Morgan (C) | Solicitor | 1972 |
| Luton South | Labour | Gavin Shuker (L) | Charity Worker | 1981 |
| Macclesfield | Conservative | David Rutley (C) | Businessman | 1961 |
| Maidstone and The Weald | Conservative | Helen Grant (C) | Solicitor | 1961 |
| Makerfield | Labour | Yvonne Fovargue (L) | Chief Executive of St Helens Citizens Advice Bureau | 1956 |
| Meon Valley | Conservative | George Hollingbery (C) | Businessman & Councillor for Winchester City Council | 1963 |
| Mid Derbyshire | Conservative | Pauline Latham OBE (C) | Councillor for Derbyshire County Council | 1948 |
| Mid Norfolk | Conservative | George Freeman (C) | Biomedical Venture Capitalist | 1967 |
| Middlesbrough South and East Cleveland | Labour | Tom Blenkinsop (L) | Trade Union Regional Official for the Community Trade Union | 1980 |
| Milton Keynes South | Labour | Iain Stewart (C) | Recruitment Executive | 1972 |
| Montgomeryshire | Liberal Democrats | Glyn Davies (C) | Former Welsh Assembly Member for Mid and West Wales | 1944 |
| Morecambe and Lunesdale | Labour | David Morris (C) | Hairdresser & Musician | 1966 |
| Newcastle upon Tyne Central | Labour | Dr. Chi Onwurah (L) | Head of Telecoms Technology at Ofcom | 1965 |
| Newcastle upon Tyne North | Labour | Catherine McKinnell (L) | Solicitor | 1976 |
| Newton Abbot | Liberal Democrats | Anne Marie Morris (C) | Businesswoman | 1957 |
| North Antrim | DUP | The Hon. Ian Paisley Jr (DUP) | Member of the Northern Ireland Assembly for North Antrim | 1966 |
| North East Cambridgeshire | Conservative | Steve Barclay (C) | Solicitor | 1972 |
| North East Somerset | Conservative | The Hon. Jacob Rees-Mogg (C) | Businessman | 1969 |
| North Swindon | Labour | Justin Tomlinson (C) | Businessman & Councillor for Swindon Borough Council | 1976 |
| North Tyneside | Labour | Mary Glindon (L) | Administrative Officer for the Child Support Agency | 1957 |
| North Warwickshire | Labour | Dan Byles (C) | Ocean Rower, Polar Adventurer, Guinness World Records holder & retired Major in the Royal Army Medical Corps | 1974 |
| North West Durham | Labour | Pat Glass (L) | Assistant Director of Education for Sunderland and Greenwich & Councillor for Lanchester Parish Council | 1957 |
| North West Leicestershire | Labour | Andrew Bridgen (C) | Businessman & retired Lieutenant in the Royal Marines | 1964 |
| Northampton North | Labour | Michael Ellis (C) | Barrister | 1967 |
| Norwich South | Labour | Simon Wright (LD) | Teacher | 1979 |
| Nottingham East | Labour | Chris Leslie (L) | Former MP for Shipley | 1972 |
| Nottingham South | Labour | Lilian Greenwood (L) | Trade Union Regional Organiser for UNISON | 1966 |
| Nuneaton | Labour | Marcus Jones (C) | Leader of Nuneaton and Bedworth Borough Council | 1974 |
| Orpington | Conservative | Jo Johnson (C) | Journalist | 1971 |
| Oxford West and Abingdon | Liberal Democrats | Nicola Blackwood (C) | Musician | 1979 |
| Pendle | Labour | Andrew Stephenson (C) | Insurance Broker | 1981 |
| Penrith and The Border | Conservative | Rory Stewart OBE (C) | Coalition Provisional Authority Deputy Governorate Co-Ordinator in Maysan, Deputy Governorate Co-ordinator in Dhi Qar, Professor of Human Rights at Harvard University, Director of the John F. Kennedy School of Government Carr Center for Human Rights Policy & retired Second Lieutenant in the Black Watch | 1973 |
| Plymouth, Sutton and Devonport | Labour | Oliver Colvile (C) | Businessman | 1959 |
| Pontypridd | Labour | Owen Smith (L) | Director of UK and Ireland Board of Amgen | 1970 |
| Portsmouth North | Labour | Penny Mordaunt (C) | Director of Diabetes UK, Head of Foreign Press for George W. Bush's Presidential Campaign & Lieutenant in the Royal Naval Reserve | 1973 |
| Pudsey | Labour | Stuart Andrew (C) | Team Leader for Martin House Hospice & Councillor for Leeds City Council | 1971 |
| Reading West | Labour | Alok Sharma (C) | Chartered Accountant | 1967 |
| Redcar | Labour | Ian Swales (LD) | Chartered Accountant | 1953 |
| Redditch | Labour | Karen Lumley (C) | Company Secretary of RKL Geological Services Ltd | 1964 |
| Richmond Park | Liberal Democrats | Zac Goldsmith (C) | Editor of 'The Ecologist' | 1975 |
| Rochdale | Labour | Simon Danczuk (L) | Social Researcher | 1966 |
| Rochester and Strood | Conservative | Mark Reckless (C) | Solicitor | 1970 |
| Romsey and Southampton North | Liberal Democrats | Caroline Nokes (C) | Chief Executive of the National Pony Society & Councillor for Test Valley Borough Council | 1972 |
| Rossendale and Darwen | Labour | Jake Berry (C) | Solicitor | 1978 |
| Rugby | Labour | Mark Pawsey (C) | Businessman | 1957 |
| Rutherglen and Hamilton West | Labour | Tom Greatrex (L) | Policy Advisor to Jim Murphy MP | 1974 |
| Salisbury | Conservative | John Glen (C) | Businessman | 1974 |
| Scunthorpe | Labour | Nic Dakin (L) | Teacher | 1955 |
| Selby and Ainsty | Conservative | Nigel Adams (C) | Businessman | 1966 |
| Sheffield Central | Labour | Paul Blomfield (L) | general manager of the University of Sheffield Union of Students | 1953 |
| Sherwood | Labour | Mark Spencer (C) | Dairy Farmer | 1970 |
| Sittingbourne and Sheppey | Conservative | Gordon Henderson (C) | Operations Manager | 1948 |
| Skipton and Ripon | Conservative | Julian Smith (C) | Businessman | 1971 |
| Sleaford and North Hykeham | Conservative | Stephen Phillips (C) | Queen's Counsel | 1970 |
| South Basildon and East Thurrock | Labour | Stephen Metcalfe (C) | Businessman & Councillor for Epping Forest District Council | 1966 |
| South Derbyshire | Labour | Heather Wheeler (C) | Leader of South Derbyshire's District Council | 1959 |
| South Dorset | Labour | Richard Drax (C) | BBC Journalist & retired Captain in the Coldstream Guards | 1958 |
| South Down | Social Democratic & Labour Party | Margaret Ritchie (SDLP) | Member of the Northern Ireland Assembly for South Down | 1958 |
| South East Cornwall | Liberal Democrats | Sheryll Murray (C) | Insurance Agent & Councillor for Cornwall County Council | 1956 |
| South Northamptonshire | Conservative | Andrea Leadsom (C) | Senior Investment Officer at Invesco Perpetual | 1963 |
| South Ribble | Labour | Lorraine Fullbrook (C) | Businesswoman | 1959 |
| South Staffordshire | Conservative | Gavin Williamson (C) | managing director of Aynsley China | 1976 |
| South Swindon | Labour | Robert Buckland (C) | Barrister | 1968 |
| South Thanet | Labour | The Hon. Laura Sandys (C) | Head of Communications for the Shopping Hours Reform Council | 1964 |
| South West Norfolk | Conservative | Liz Truss (C) | Deputy Director of Reform | 1975 |
| Spelthorne | Conservative | Dr. Kwasi Kwarteng (C) | Financial Analyst | 1975 |
| St Austell and Newquay | Liberal Democrats | Steve Gilbert (LD) | Public Affairs Consultant | 1976 |
| Stafford | Labour | Jeremy Lefroy (C) | Owner of Equity for Africa & Councillor for Newcastle-under-Lyme Borough Council | 1959 |
| Staffordshire Moorlands | Conservative | Karen Bradley (C) | Economic Consultant for KPMG | 1970 |
| Stalybridge and Hyde | Labour | Jonathan Reynolds (L) | Solicitor | 1980 |
| Stevenage | Labour | Stephen McPartland (C) | Director of Membership for British American Business (United States Chamber of Commerce) | 1976 |
| Stockton North | Labour | Alex Cunningham (L) | managing director of Tees Valley Communicators | 1955 |
| Stockton South | Labour | James Wharton (C) | Solicitor | 1984 |
| Stoke-on-Trent Central | Labour | The Hon. Dr. Tristram Hunt (L) | Historian & Journalist | 1974 |
| Stourbridge | Labour | Margot James (C) | Businesswoman | 1957 |
| Stratford-on-Avon | Conservative | Nadhim Zahawi (C) | Chief Executive & Co-founder of YouGov | 1967 |
| Streatham | Labour | Chuka Umunna (L) | Solicitor | 1978 |
| Stretford and Urmston | Labour | Kate Green OBE (L) | Chief Executive of the Child Poverty Action Group | 1960 |
| Stroud | Labour | Neil Carmichael (C) | Businessman | 1961 |
| Suffolk Coastal | Conservative | Dr. Therese Coffey (C) | Property Finance Manager for the BBC | 1971 |
| Sunderland Central | Labour | Julie Elliott (L) | Trade Unionist Regional Organiser for GMB | 1963 |
| Swansea West | Labour | Geraint Davies (L) | Former MP for Croydon Central | 1960 |
| Tamworth | Labour | Christopher Pincher (C) | IT Consultant | 1969 |
| Thurrock | Labour | Jackie Doyle-Price (C) | Parliamentary Officer at The City of London & Private Secretary to the Lord Mayor of the City of London | 1969 |
| Tiverton and Honiton | Conservative | Neil Parish (C) | Former MEP for South West England | 1956 |
| Totnes | Conservative | Sarah Wollaston (C) | Doctor | 1962 |
| Truro and Falmouth | Liberal Democrats | Sarah Newton (C) | Director of The International Longevity Centre | 1961 |
| Vale of Glamorgan | Labour | Alun Cairns (C) | Member of the Welsh Assembly for South Wales West | 1970 |
| Walsall South | Labour | Valerie Vaz (L) | Solicitor | 1954 |
| Walthamstow | Labour | Dr. Stella Creasy (L) | Head of Public Affairs for the Scout Association & Councillor for Waltham Forest | 1977 |
| Wansbeck | Labour | Ian Lavery (L) | President of the National Union of Mineworkers | 1963 |
| Warrington South | Labour | David Mowat (C) | Chartered Accountant | 1957 |
| Warwick and Leamington | Labour | Chris White (C) | Businessman & Councillor for Warwick District Council | 1967 |
| Watford | Labour | Richard Harrington (C) | Businessman | 1957 |
| Waveney | Labour | Peter Aldous (C) | Chartered Surveyor | 1961 |
| Weaver Vale | Labour | Graham Evans (C) | Company Director | 1963 |
| Wells | Conservative | Tessa Munt (LD) | Personal Assistant | 1959 |
| West Dunbartonshire | Labour | Gemma Doyle (L) | Party Researcher for Cathy Craigie MSP | 1981 |
| West Suffolk | Conservative | Matthew Hancock (C) | Chief of Staff to George Osborne MP | 1978 |
| West Worcestershire | Conservative | Harriett Baldwin (C) | Head of Currency Management for JP Morgan Chase | 1960 |
| Wigan | Labour | Lisa Nandy (L) | Senior Policy Adviser for The Children's Society & Councillor for Hammersmith and Fulham Borough Council | 1979 |
| Winchester | Liberal Democrats | Steve Brine (C) | Management Consultant | 1974 |
| Wirral South | Labour | Alison McGovern (L) | Communications Development Officer for National Rail & Councillor for Southwark Borough Council | 1980 |
| Wirral West | Labour | Esther McVey (C) | Businesswoman & TV Presenter | 1967 |
| Witham | Conservative | Priti Patel (C) | Corporate Relations Director for Diageo | 1972 |
| Woking | Conservative | Jonathan Lord (C) | Director of Saatchi & Saatchi & Councillor for Surrey County Council | 1962 |
| Wolverhampton North East | Labour | Emma Reynolds (L) | Public Affairs Consultant | 1977 |
| Wolverhampton South West | Labour | Paul Uppal (C) | Barrister | 1967 |
| Worcester | Labour | The Hon. Robin Walker (C) | Businessman | 1978 |
| Wycombe | Conservative | Steve Baker (C) | Management Consultant & retired Flight Lieutenant in the Royal Air Force | 1971 |
| Wyre Forest | Health Concern | Mark Garnier (C) | Investment Banker | 1963 |
| York Outer | Liberal Democrats | Julian Sturdy (C) | Farmer | 1971 |

== See also ==
- List of new members of the 112th United States Congress (also elected in 2010)
