= Pete Stark =

American politician (1931–2020)

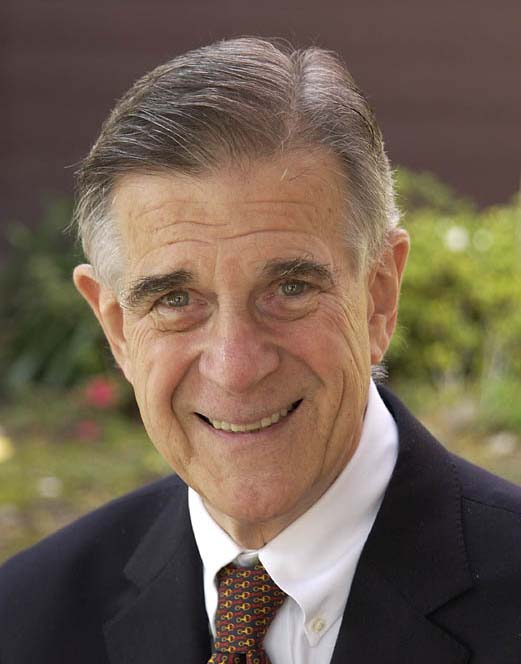
- Official portrait, 2002

Acting Chair of the House Ways and Means Committee
- In office March 3, 2010 – March 4, 2010
- Preceded by: Charlie Rangel
- Succeeded by: Sander Levin

Chair of the House District of Columbia Committee
- In office January 3, 1993 – January 3, 1995
- Preceded by: Ron Dellums
- Succeeded by: William Clinger (House Oversight Committee)

Member of the U.S. House of Representatives from California
- In office January 3, 1973 – January 3, 2013
- Preceded by: George P. Miller
- Succeeded by: Eric Swalwell (redistricted)
- Constituency: 8th district (1973–1975); 9th district (1975–1993); 13th district (1993–2013)

Personal details
- Born: Fortney Hillman Stark Jr. November 11, 1931 Milwaukee, Wisconsin, U.S.
- Died: January 24, 2020 (aged 88) Harwood, Maryland, U.S.
- Party: Democratic
- Spouses: Elinor Brumder (m. 1955, divorced); Carolyn Wente (m. 1989; div. 1991); Deborah Roderick (m. 1991)
- Children: 7
- Education: Massachusetts Institute of Technology (BS); University of California, Berkeley (MBA)

Military service
- Branch/service: United States Air Force
- Years of service: 1955–1957
- Stark's voice Stark speaks on how his deceased House colleague, Julian Dixon, supported District of Columbia home rule. Recorded December 8, 2000

Fortney Hillman "Pete" Stark Jr. (November 11, 1931 – January 24, 2020) was an American businessman and politician who was a member of the United States House of Representatives from 1973 to 2013. A Democrat from California, Stark's district—California's 13th congressional district during his last two decades in Congress—was in southwestern Alameda County and included Alameda, Union City, Hayward, Newark, San Leandro, San Lorenzo, and Fremont (his residence during the early part of his tenure), as well as parts of Oakland and Pleasanton. At the time he left office in 2013, he was the fifth most senior Representative, as well as sixth most senior member of Congress overall. He was also the dean of California's 53-member Congressional delegation, and the only openly atheist member of Congress.

After 2010 redistricting, Stark's district was renumbered as the 15th district for the 2012 election. He narrowly finished first in the primary ahead of fellow Democrat Eric Swalwell, but lost to Swalwell in the general election. He was the second-longest serving U.S. Congressman, after Jack Brooks (D-Texas, 1994), to lose a general election.

== Early life, education, and banking career ==
Stark was born on November 11, 1931, in Milwaukee, Wisconsin, the son of Dorothy M. (née Mueller) and Fortney Hillman Stark. He was of German and Swiss descent.

He graduated from Wauwatosa High School in 1949. Stark received a Bachelor of Science degree in general engineering at the Massachusetts Institute of Technology in 1953. He served in the United States Air Force from 1955 to 1957. After leaving the Air Force, Stark attended the Haas School of Business at the University of California, Berkeley, and received his MBA in 1960.

In 1963, Stark founded Security National Bank, based in Walnut Creek. He described it as "a bank whose sole purpose was to fulfill the financial needs of working people." It was reportedly the first in the country to offer free checking. While Stark grew up as a Republican, his opposition to the Vietnam War led him to switch parties in the mid-1960s. He printed checks with peace signs on them and placed a giant peace sign on the roof of his bank's headquarters. In 1971, Stark was elected to the Common Cause National Governing Board. Stark sold his interest in the bank for millions in 1972 when he was elected to the House of Representatives.

== U.S. House of Representatives ==
=== Elections ===
In 1972, at the age of 41, Stark ran in the Democratic primary against 14-term incumbent U.S. Representative and octogenarian George Paul Miller of Alameda in what was then the 8th district. He won the Democratic primary with 56% of the vote, a 34-point margin. In the 1972 United States House of Representatives elections, he defeated Republican Lew Warden with 53% of the vote. He did not face another contest that close until 2012, and was reelected 18 times.

Stark was unopposed for the Democratic nomination in the 2008 election and was reelected in the general election with 76.5% of the vote.

He faced his first Democratic challenger in 2010, and the challenger showed weakening support for Stark, gathering 16% of the primary votes without any endorsements.

In the 2012 United States House of Representatives elections, Stark's district was renumbered as the 15th district, and only retained roughly half of Stark's former territory. Because of California's new nonpartisan blanket primary, which allows the general election to be contested by the two highest vote-getters in the primary regardless of party affiliation, his opponent in the general election was Dublin city councilman Eric Swalwell, a fellow Democrat who was almost half a century Stark's junior. Indeed, Stark won his first race eight years before Swalwell was born. During the campaign, the Stark campaign circulated a flyer falsely associating Swalwell with the Tea Party movement, a characterization rejected by both the Swalwell campaign and Josh Richman of the San Jose Mercury News. In the general election, Swalwell defeated Stark with 52% of the vote in an upset.

=== Tenure ===
At 40 years (as of the end of service on January 3, 2013), Stark had been the longest-serving member of Congress from California, serving continuously from January 3, 1973, through January 3, 2013. The Hayward Area Historical Society is the repository of Stark's papers from his tenure.

=== Fiscal policy ===
Stark voted against the Food, Conservation, and Energy Act of 2008, which was supported by most House Democrats and over half of House Republicans, in part because of its cost.

Stark voted both times against the Emergency Economic Stabilization Act of 2008, which created the Troubled Asset Relief Program. Stark strongly criticized the bank bailout legislation. He said he was "one of the few members on my side of the aisle to vote against the TARP bill both times....because I believed that it rewarded the very entities that built the financial house of cards that has come crashing down."

Stark supported a 0.005% financial transaction tax applying to "trades of stocks, bonds, foreign exchange, futures and options involving large-scale traders who make more than $10,000 in transactions" annually. In 2010, he introduced a bill, the Investing in Our Future Act, that would create such a tax. The bill proposed using the revenue raised to invest in climate change adaptation, child care programs, and a Global Health Trust Fund to combat diseases, such as HIV/AIDS, malaria, and tuberculosis.

=== Healthcare ===
Stark had a longstanding interest in healthcare issues and was critical of the health insurance coverage in the United States during the George W. Bush administration. With John Conyers, in April 2006, Stark brought an action against President Bush and others alleging violations of the United States Constitution in the passing of the Deficit Reduction Act of 2005, which cut Medicaid payments. The case, Conyers v. Bush, was dismissed for lack of standing in November 2006.

In January 1985, Stark became Chairman of the Ways and Means Health Subcommittee with jurisdiction over Medicare and national health insurance proposals. Over the years, he used Budget Reconciliation bills to add amendments to impact healthcare. An amendment to the Consolidated Omnibus Budget Reconciliation Act of 1985 (COBRA) required many employers to offer continuation health insurance coverage in many different situations (divorce, separation from employment, etc.) Over the years, tens of millions of Americans have used this COBRA law to continue health coverage. In 1986, he led in amending that year's budget bill to include the Emergency Medical Treatment and Active Labor Act, which requires hospitals to treat and stabilize persons presenting at emergency rooms with emergency conditions or in active labor, regardless of the person's insurance status or ability to pay. In 1988, Stark introduced an "Ethics in Patient Referrals Act" bill concerning physician self-referrals. Some of the ideas in the bill became law as part of the Omnibus Budget Reconciliation Act of 1990. What is referred to as "Stark I" prohibited a physician referring a Medicare patient to a clinical laboratory if the physician or his/her family member has a financial interest in that laboratory. It was codified in the United States Code, Title 42, Section 1395nn (42 U.S.C. 1395nn, "Limitation on certain physician referrals").

The Omnibus Budget Reconciliation Act of 1993 contained what is known as "Stark II" amendments to the original law. "Stark II" extended the "Stark I" provisions to Medicaid patients and to certain designated health services other than clinical laboratory services, such as radiology and imaging, physical and occupational therapy, durable equipment, prosthetics and orthotics, enteral and parenteral nutrition, pharmacies, and other inpatient and outpatient hospital services.

The Centers for Medicare and Medicaid Services has issued rules in the Federal Register to implement Stark Law, including a 2001 "Phase I" final rule, a 2004 "Phase II" interim final rule, and a 2007 "Phase III" final rule.

Over the years, Stark worked with others, notably his Republican counterpart, Bill Gradison (Ohio), and Representatives Henry Waxman, George Miller, and Senator Ted Kennedy, to advance health improvement ideas. Stark led in introducing bills to allow more people to buy into Medicare at an earlier age, to expand Medicare by allowing all infants to enroll in Medicare, and to provide a prescription drug benefit in Medicare. In his work on the Clinton health care plan of 1993, Stark developed, and continued to promote the basic ideas now part of the Affordable Care Act and in various Medicare for Americans ideas: all Americans should have good, basic health insurance; if they don't have such coverage, they should buy it, and if they can't afford it, they should get government subsidies to make it affordable.

In 2010, Stark's seniority would have placed him in line for the chairmanship of the Ways and Means committee, when Charlie Rangel was forced by ethics charges to step down. However Stark only held the chairmanship for one day, as Democrats instead voted for Sander Levin to take over, due to Stark's history of controversial remarks.

=== Iraq War ===
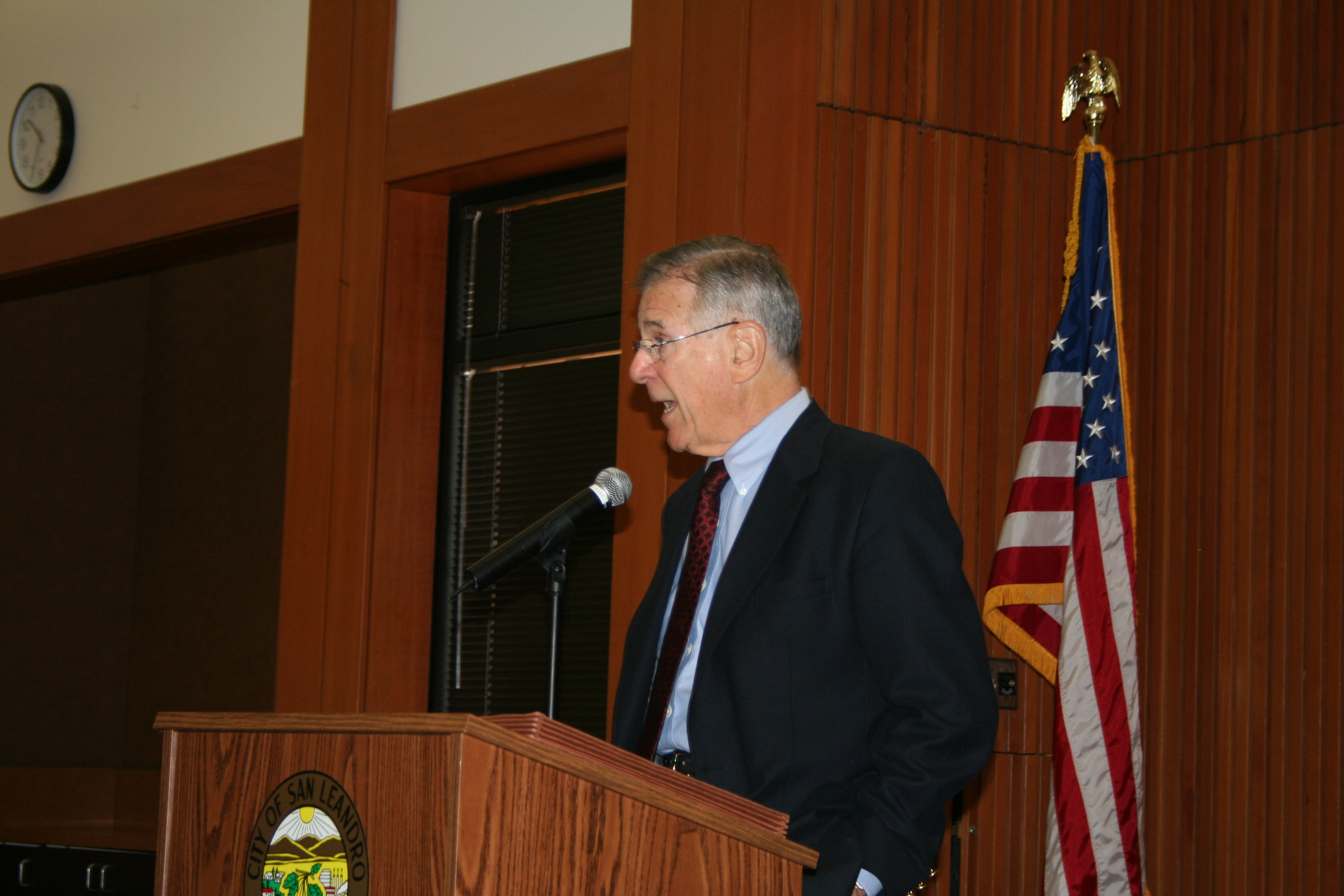
Pete Stark speaks at a Town Hall meeting in January 2007 in San Leandro, California.

Stark was an early opponent of the Iraq War, speaking on the floor against the resolution authorizing military force against Iraq, on October 10, 2002. In part, he said:

Well then, who will pay? School kids will pay. There'll be no money to keep them from being left behind—way behind. Seniors will pay. They'll pay big time as the Republicans privatize Social Security and rob the Trust Fund to pay for the capricious war. Medicare will be curtailed and drugs will be more unaffordable. And there won't be any money for a drug benefit because Bush will spend it all on the war. Working folks will pay through loss of job security and bargaining rights. Our grandchildren will pay through the degradation of our air and water quality. And the entire nation will pay as Bush continues to destroy civil rights, women's rights and religious freedom in a rush to phony patriotism and to courting the messianic Pharisees of the religious right.

In January 2003, Stark supported a reinstatement of the draft, partly in protest against the call to war but also saying, "If we're going to have these escapades, we should not do it on the backs of poor people and minorities." In October 2004, he was one of only two members of Congress to vote in favor of the Universal National Service Act of 2003 (HR 163), a bill proposing resumption of the military draft.

He did not vote for any bills to continue funding the Iraq war, but voted 'present' for some. In a statement posted on his website he explained, "Despite my utmost respect for my colleagues who crafted this bill, I can't in good conscience vote to continue this war. Nor, however, can I vote 'No' and join those who think today's legislation goes too far toward withdrawal. That's why I'm making the difficult decision to vote 'present'."

=== Atheism ===
"[I am] a Unitarian who does not believe in a Supreme Being. I look forward to working with the Secular Coalition to stop the promotion of narrow religious beliefs in science, marriage contracts, the military and the provision of social service."

— Statement from Stark, January 2007

Stark was the first openly atheist member of Congress, as announced by the Secular Coalition for America. He acknowledged that he was an atheist in response to an SCA questionnaire sent to public officials in January 2007.

On September 20, 2007, Stark reaffirmed that he was an atheist by making a public announcement in front of the Humanist Chaplaincy at Harvard, the Harvard Law School Heathen Society, and various other atheist, agnostic, secular, humanist, and nonreligious groups. The American Humanist Association named him 2008 Humanist of the Year, and he served on the AHA Advisory Board. On February 9, 2011, Stark introduced a bill to Congress designating February 12, 2011, as Darwin Day; this was a collaboration between Stark and the American Humanist Association. The resolution states, "Charles Darwin is a worthy symbol of scientific advancement ... and around which to build a global celebration of science and humanity."

In 2011, he and eight other lawmakers voted to reject the existing national motto, “In God We Trust." The next year, Eric Swalwell, his challenger in the Democratic primary campaign, criticized him for this vote.

Stark served on the Advisory Board of the Secular Coalition for America.

=== Committee assignments ===
- Committee on Ways and Means
  - Subcommittee on Health (Ranking Member)
  - Subcommittee on Income Security and Family Support

Caucuses

- Congressional Progressive Caucus
- Congressional Asian Pacific American Caucus (Associate Member)
- International Conservation Caucus

== Controversies ==
=== Controversial statements ===
In 1991, he singled out "Jewish colleagues" for blame for the Gulf War, claiming they voted for it "as a matter of convenience" to help Israel and referring to Congressman Stephen Solarz of New York, who co-sponsored the Gulf War Authorization Act, as "Field Marshal Solarz in the pro-Israel forces".

In 1995, during a private meeting with Congresswoman Nancy Johnson of Connecticut, he called Johnson a "whore for the insurance industry" and suggested that her knowledge of healthcare came solely from "pillow talk" with her husband, a physician. His press secretary, Caleb Marshall, defended him in saying, "He didn't call her a 'whore', he called her a 'whore of the insurance industry.'"

In a 2001 Ways and Means Subcommittee on Health hearing on abstinence promotion, he referred to Congressman J. C. Watts of Oklahoma as "the current Republican Conference Chairman, whose children were all born out of wedlock."

In 2003, when Stark was told to "shut up" by Congressman Scott McInnis of Colorado during a Ways and Means Committee meeting due to Stark's belittling of the chairman, Bill Thomas of California, he replied, "You think you are big enough to make me, you little wimp? Come on. Come over here and make me, I dare you. You little fruitcake."

In a 2008 interview with documentarian Jan Helfeld, Stark stated that the size of the national debt is a reflection of the nation's wealth. When pressed if the nation should take on more debt in order to have more wealth, Stark threatened Helfeld: "You get the fuck out of here or I'll throw you out the window."

On August 27, 2009, Stark suggested that his moderate Democratic colleagues were "brain dead" for proposing changes to the America's Affordable Health Choices Act of 2009 being considered by Congress. During a conference call, Stark said that they:

... just want to cause trouble ... they're for the most part, I hate to say, brain dead, but they're just looking to raise money from insurance companies and promote a right-wing agenda that is not really very useful in this whole process.

During a town hall meeting in September 2009, a constituent who opposed President Barack Obama's healthcare plan told Stark, "Mr. Congressman, don't pee on my leg and tell me it's raining." Stark responded with, "I wouldn't dignify you by peeing on your leg. It wouldn't be worth wasting the urine."

==== 2007 debate ====
On October 18, 2007, Stark made the following comments on the House floor during a debate with Congressman Joe Barton of Texas:

"You don't have money to fund the war or children...but you're going to spend it to blow up innocent people if we can get enough kids to grow old enough for you to send to Iraq to get their heads blown off for the president's amusement."

Following the initial criticism to his statements, when asked by a radio station if he would take back any of his statements, Stark responded "Absolutely not. I may have dishonored the Commander-in-Chief, but I think he's done pretty well to dishonor himself without any help from me." The same day, his office also issued a press release, saying in part: "I have nothing but respect for our brave men and women in uniform and wish them the very best. But I respect neither the Commander-in-Chief who keeps them in harms [sic] way nor the chickenhawks in Congress who vote to deny children healthcare”.

Five days later, on October 23, after the House voted down a censure resolution against Stark sponsored by Minority Leader John Boehner, he said:

I apologize for this reason: I think we have serious issues before us, the issue of providing medical care to children, the issue about what we're going to do about a war that we're divided about how to end.

=== Real estate taxes ===
Stark bought a $1.7 million waterfront home in Harwood, Anne Arundel County, Maryland, in 1988, and spent most of his time there in the latter part of his congressional tenure. However, he continued to claim a house in Fremont as his official residence, and visited his Bay Area district twice a month. Following his retirement from public office, he remained in Maryland.

For two years, in 2007 and 2008, Stark allegedly claimed the Harwood house as his primary residence, claiming a homestead exemption that reduced his real estate taxes by $3,853. Under Maryland law, to qualify, the owner must register to vote and drive in Maryland; Stark was registered in California despite living in Maryland for two-thirds of the year. The United States House Committee on Ethics began an investigation and in January 2010, it voted unanimously to clear Stark of any wrongdoing.

== Electoral history ==
Year	District	Democratic		Republican		Other								
1972	8th district	Pete Stark	52%	Lew M. Warden	47%									
1974	9th district	Pete Stark (inc.)	71%	Edson Adams	29%									
1976	9th district	Pete Stark (inc.)	71%	James K. Mills	27%	Albert L. Sargis	Peace & Freedom	2%						
1978	9th district	Pete Stark (inc.)	65%	Robert S. Allen	31%	Lawrance J. Phillips	Peace & Freedom	4%						
1980	9th district	Pete Stark (inc.)	55%	William J. Kennedy	41%	Steven W. Clanin	Libertarian	4%						
1982	9th district	Pete Stark (inc.)	60%	William J. Kennedy	39%									
1984	9th district	Pete Stark (inc.)	70%	J.T. Beaver	26%	Martha Fuhrig	Libertarian	4%						
1986	9th district	Pete Stark (inc.)	70%	David M. Williams	30%									
1988	9th district	Pete Stark (inc.)	73%	Howard Hertz	27%									
1990	9th district	Pete Stark (inc.)	58%	Victor Romero	41%									
1992	13th district	Pete Stark (inc.)	60%	Verne Teyler	32%	Roslyn A. Allen	Peace & Freedom	8%						
1994	13th district	Pete Stark (inc.)	65%	Larry Molton	30%	Robert Gough	Libertarian	5%						
1996	13th district	Pete Stark (inc.)	65%	James S. Fay	30%	Terry Savage	Libertarian	4%						
1998	13th district	Pete Stark (inc.)	71%	James R. Goetz	27%	Karnig Beylikjian	Natural Law	4%						
2000	13th district	Pete Stark (inc.)	71%	James R. Goetz	24%	Howard Mora	Libertarian	3%	Timothy R. Hoehner	Natural Law	1%	Don J.Grundman	American Independent	1%
2002	13th district	Pete Stark (inc.)	71%	Syed R. Mahmood	22%	Mark R. Stroberg	Libertarian	3%	Don J.Grundman	American Independent	2%	John J. Bambey	Reform	2%
2004	13th district	Pete Stark (inc.)	72%	George I. Bruno	28%	Mark R. Stroberg	Libertarian	4%						
2006	13th district	Pete Stark (inc.)	76%	George L. Bruno	25%									
2008	13th district	Pete Stark (inc.)	76%	Raymond Chui	23%									
2010	13th district	Pete Stark (inc.)	72%	Forest Baker	27%									

Year	District	Democratic		Democratic	
2012	California 15th District	Eric Swalwell	52%	Pete Stark (inc.)	48%

== Death ==
Stark died at his home in Harwood, Maryland, on January 24, 2020, at the age of 88, from leukemia. His successor in Congress, Eric Swalwell, issued a statement:

Pete Stark gave decades of public service to East Bay residents as a voice in Congress for working people... His knowledge of policy, particularly regarding healthcare, and his opposition to unnecessary wars demonstrated his deep care for his constituents. Our community mourns his loss.

== See also ==
- List of atheists in politics and law

U.S. House of Representatives
Preceded by George P. Miller	Member of the U.S. House of Representatives from California's 8th congressional district 1973–1975	Succeeded by Ron Dellums
Preceded by Don Edwards	Member of the U.S. House of Representatives from California's 9th congressional district 1975–1993	Succeeded by Ron Dellums
Preceded by Norman Mineta	Member of the U.S. House of Representatives from California's 13th congressional district 1993–2013	Succeeded by Barbara Lee
Preceded by Ron Dellums	Chair of the House District of Columbia Committee; 1993–1995	Succeeded by William Clinger as Chair of the House Oversight Committee
Preceded by Charlie Rangel	Chair of the House Ways and Means Committee; Acting; 2010	Succeeded by Sander Levin
