= List of United States representatives in the 112th Congress =

This is a complete list of United States representatives during the 112th United States Congress (January 3, 2011 – January 3, 2013) in order of seniority. For the most part, representatives are ranked by the beginning of their terms in office. Representatives whose terms begin the same day are ranked by seniority.

Note: The "*" indicates that the representative/delegate may have served one or more non-consecutive terms while in the House of Representatives of the United States Congress.

== U.S. House seniority list ==
U.S. House seniority
| Rank | Representative | Party | District | Seniority date (Previous service, if any) | Term # | Notes |
|---|---|---|---|---|---|---|
| 1 | John Dingell | D | MI-15 | December 13, 1955 | 29th term | Dean of the House |
| 2 | John Conyers | D | MI-14 | January 3, 1965 | 24th term | Ranking Member: Judiciary; Dean of the Congressional Black Caucus |
| 3 | Charles Rangel | D | NY-15 | January 3, 1971 | 21st term | |
| 4 | Bill Young | R | FL-10 | January 3, 1971 | 21st term | |
| 5 | Pete Stark | D | CA-13 | January 3, 1973 | 20th term | Defeated in 2012 primary. |
| 6 | Don Young | R | AK-AL | March 6, 1973 | 20th term | |
| 7 | George Miller | D | CA-07 | January 3, 1975 | 19th term | Ranking Member: Education and the Workforce |
| 8 | Henry Waxman | D | CA-30 | January 3, 1975 | 19th term | Ranking Member: Energy and Commerce |
| 9 | Ed Markey | D | MA-07 | November 2, 1976 | 19th term | Ranking Member: Natural Resources |
| 10 | Norm Dicks | D | WA-06 | January 3, 1977 | 18th term | Ranking Member: Appropriations; Retired in 2013. |
| 11 | Dale Kildee | D | MI-05 | January 3, 1977 | 18th term | Retired in 2013. |
| 12 | Nick Rahall | D | WV-03 | January 3, 1977 | 18th term | Ranking Member: Transportation and Infrastructure |
| 13 | Jerry Lewis | R | CA-41 | January 3, 1979 | 17th term | Left the House in 2013. |
| 14 | Jim Sensenbrenner | R | WI-05 | January 3, 1979 | 17th term | |
| 15 | Tom Petri | R | WI-06 | April 3, 1979 | 17th term | |
| 16 | David Dreier | R | CA-26 | January 3, 1981 | 16th term | Chair: Rules; Retired in 2013. |
| 17 | Barney Frank | D | MA-04 | January 3, 1981 | 16th term | Ranking Member: Financial Services; Retired in 2013. |
| 18 | Ralph Hall | R | TX-04 | January 3, 1981 | 16th term | Chair: Science, Space and Technology |
| 19 | Hal Rogers | R | KY-05 | January 3, 1981 | 16th term | Chair: Appropriations |
| 20 | Chris Smith | R | NJ-04 | January 3, 1981 | 16th term | |
| 21 | Frank Wolf | R | VA-10 | January 3, 1981 | 16th term | |
| 22 | Steny Hoyer | D | MD-05 | May 19, 1981 | 16th term | Minority Whip |
| 23 | Howard Berman | D | CA-28 | January 3, 1983 | 15th term | Ranking Member: Foreign Affairs; Defeated in 2012 general election. |
| 24 | Dan Burton | R | IN-05 | January 3, 1983 | 15th term | Retired in 2013. |
| 25 | Marcy Kaptur | D | OH-09 | January 3, 1983 | 15th term | Most senior woman in the U.S. House of Representatives. |
| 26 | Sander Levin | D | MI-12 | January 3, 1983 | 15th term | Ranking Member: Ways and Means |
| 27 | Edolphus Towns | D | NY-10 | January 3, 1983 | 15th term | Left the House in 2013. |
| 28 | Gary Ackerman | D | NY-05 | March 1, 1983 | 15th term | Retired in 2013. |
| 29 | Joe Barton | R | TX-06 | January 3, 1985 | 14th term | |
| 30 | Howard Coble | R | NC-06 | January 3, 1985 | 14th term | |
| 31 | Pete Visclosky | D | IN-01 | January 3, 1985 | 14th term | |
| 32 | Peter DeFazio | D | OR-04 | January 3, 1987 | 13th term | |
| 33 | Elton Gallegly | R | CA-24 | January 3, 1987 | 13th term | Retired in 2013. |
| 34 | Wally Herger | R | CA-02 | January 3, 1987 | 13th term | Retired in 2013. |
| 35 | John Lewis | D | GA-05 | January 3, 1987 | 13th term | |
| 36 | Louise Slaughter | D | NY-28 | January 3, 1987 | 13th term | Ranking Member: Rules |
| 37 | Lamar Smith | R | TX-21 | January 3, 1987 | 13th term | Chair: Judiciary |
| 38 | Fred Upton | R | MI-06 | January 3, 1987 | 13th term | Chair: Energy and Commerce |
| 39 | Nancy Pelosi | D | CA-08 | June 2, 1987 | 13th term | Minority Leader |
| 40 | Jerry Costello | D | IL-12 | August 9, 1988 | 13th term | Retired in 2013. |
| 41 | Frank Pallone | D | NJ-06 | November 8, 1988 | 13th term | |
| 42 | Jimmy Duncan | R | TN-02 | November 8, 1988 | 13th term | |
| 43 | Eliot Engel | D | NY-17 | January 3, 1989 | 12th term | |
| 44 | Nita Lowey | D | NY-18 | January 3, 1989 | 12th term | |
| 45 | Jim McDermott | D | WA-07 | January 3, 1989 | 12th term | |
| 46 | Richard Neal | D | MA-02 | January 3, 1989 | 12th term | |
| 47 | Donald M. Payne | D | NJ-10 | January 3, 1989 | 12th term | Died on March 6, 2012. |
| 48 | Dana Rohrabacher | R | CA-46 | January 3, 1989 | 12th term | |
| 49 | Cliff Stearns | R | FL-06 | January 3, 1989 | 12th term | Defeated in 2012 general election. |
| 50 | Ileana Ros-Lehtinen | R | FL-18 | August 29, 1989 | 12th term | Chair: Foreign Affairs |
| 51 | José E. Serrano | D | NY-16 | March 21, 1990 | 12th term | |
| 52 | Rob Andrews | D | NJ-01 | November 6, 1990 | 12th term | |
| 53 | Ron Paul | R | TX-14 | January 3, 1997 | 12th term** | Previously served from 1976 to 1977 and from 1979 to 1985. Left the House in 2013. |
| 54 | David Price | D | NC-04 | January 3, 1997 | 12th term* | Previously served from 1987 to 1995. |
| 55 | John Boehner | R | OH-08 | January 3, 1991 | 11th term | Speaker of the House |
| 56 | Dave Camp | R | MI-04 | January 3, 1991 | 11th term | Chair: Ways and Means |
| 57 | Rosa DeLauro | D | CT-03 | January 3, 1991 | 11th term | |
| 58 | Jim Moran | D | VA-08 | January 3, 1991 | 11th term | |
| 59 | Collin Peterson | D | MN-07 | January 3, 1991 | 11th term | Ranking Member: Agriculture |
| 60 | Maxine Waters | D | CA-35 | January 3, 1991 | 11th term | |
| 61 | Sam Johnson | R | TX-03 | May 8, 1991 | 11th term | |
| 62 | John Olver | D | MA-01 | June 4, 1991 | 11th term | Retired in 2013. |
| 63 | Ed Pastor | D | AZ-04 | October 3, 1991 | 11th term | |
| 64 | Jerry Nadler | D | NY-08 | November 3, 1992 | 11th term | |
| 65 | Jim Cooper | D | TN-05 | January 3, 2003 | 11th term* | Previously served from 1983 to 1995. |
| 66 | Spencer Bachus | R | AL-06 | January 3, 1993 | 10th term | Chair: Financial Services |
| 67 | Roscoe Bartlett | R | MD-06 | January 3, 1993 | 10th term | Defeated in 2012 general election. |
| 68 | Xavier Becerra | D | CA-31 | January 3, 1993 | 10th term | |
| 69 | Sanford Bishop | D | GA-02 | January 3, 1993 | 10th term | |
| 70 | Corrine Brown | D | FL-03 | January 3, 1993 | 10th term | |
| 71 | Ken Calvert | R | CA-44 | January 3, 1993 | 10th term | |
| 72 | Jim Clyburn | D | SC-06 | January 3, 1993 | 10th term | Assistant Minority Leader |
| 73 | Anna Eshoo | D | CA-14 | January 3, 1993 | 10th term | |
| 74 | Bob Filner | D | CA-51 | January 3, 1993 | 10th term | Ranking Member: Veterans' Affairs; Resigned on December 3, 2012. |
| 75 | Bob Goodlatte | R | VA-06 | January 3, 1993 | 10th term | |
| 76 | Gene Green | D | TX-29 | January 3, 1993 | 10th term | |
| 77 | Luis Gutiérrez | D | IL-04 | January 3, 1993 | 10th term | |
| 78 | Alcee Hastings | D | FL-23 | January 3, 1993 | 10th term | |
| 79 | Maurice Hinchey | D | NY-22 | January 3, 1993 | 10th term | Retired in 2013. |
| 80 | Tim Holden | D | PA-17 | January 3, 1993 | 10th term | Defeated in 2012 primary. |
| 81 | Eddie Bernice Johnson | D | TX-30 | January 3, 1993 | 10th term | Ranking Member: Science, Space and Technology |
| 82 | Peter T. King | R | NY-03 | January 3, 1993 | 10th term | Chair: Homeland Security |
| 83 | Jack Kingston | R | GA-01 | January 3, 1993 | 10th term | |
| 84 | Buck McKeon | R | CA-25 | January 3, 1993 | 10th term | Chair: Armed Services |
| 85 | Carolyn Maloney | D | NY-14 | January 3, 1993 | 10th term | |
| 86 | Don Manzullo | R | IL-16 | January 3, 1993 | 10th term | Defeated in 2012 primary. |
| 87 | John Mica | R | FL-07 | January 3, 1993 | 10th term | Chair: Transportation and Infrastructure |
| 88 | Lucille Roybal-Allard | D | CA-34 | January 3, 1993 | 10th term | |
| 89 | Ed Royce | R | CA-40 | January 3, 1993 | 10th term | |
| 90 | Bobby Rush | D | IL-01 | January 3, 1993 | 10th term | |
| 91 | Bobby Scott | D | VA-03 | January 3, 1993 | 10th term | |
| 92 | Nydia Velázquez | D | NY-12 | January 3, 1993 | 10th term | Ranking Member: Small Business |
| 93 | Mel Watt | D | NC-12 | January 3, 1993 | 10th term | |
| 94 | Lynn Woolsey | D | CA-06 | January 3, 1993 | 10th term | Retired in 2013. |
| 95 | Bennie Thompson | D | MS-02 | April 13, 1993 | 10th term | Ranking Member: Homeland Security |
| 96 | Sam Farr | D | CA-17 | June 8, 1993 | 10th term | |
| 97 | Frank Lucas | R | OK-03 | May 10, 1994 | 10th term | Chair: Agriculture |
| 98 | Lloyd Doggett | D | TX-25 | January 3, 1995 | 9th term | |
| 99 | Mike Doyle | D | PA-14 | January 3, 1995 | 9th term | |
| 100 | Chaka Fattah | D | PA-02 | January 3, 1995 | 9th term | |
| 101 | Rodney Frelinghuysen | R | NJ-11 | January 3, 1995 | 9th term | |
| 102 | Doc Hastings | R | WA-04 | January 3, 1995 | 9th term | Chair: Natural Resources |
| 103 | Sheila Jackson Lee | D | TX-18 | January 3, 1995 | 9th term | |
| 104 | Walter B. Jones Jr. | R | NC-03 | January 3, 1995 | 9th term | |
| 105 | Tom Latham | R | IA-04 | January 3, 1995 | 9th term | |
| 106 | Steve LaTourette | R | OH-14 | January 3, 1995 | 9th term | Retired in 2013. |
| 107 | Frank LoBiondo | R | NJ-02 | January 3, 1995 | 9th term | |
| 108 | Zoe Lofgren | D | CA-16 | January 3, 1995 | 9th term | Ranking Member: Ethics |
| 109 | Sue Myrick | R | NC-09 | January 3, 1995 | 9th term | Retired in 2013. |
| 110 | Mac Thornberry | R | TX-13 | January 3, 1995 | 9th term | |
| 111 | Ed Whitfield | R | KY-01 | January 3, 1995 | 9th term | |
| 112 | Jesse Jackson Jr. | D | IL-02 | December 12, 1995 | 9th term | Resigned on November 21, 2012. |
| 113 | Elijah Cummings | D | MD-07 | April 16, 1996 | 9th term | Ranking Member: Oversight and Government Reform |
| 114 | Earl Blumenauer | D | OR-03 | May 21, 1996 | 9th term | |
| 115 | Jo Ann Emerson | R | MO-08 | November 5, 1996 | 9th term | |
| 116 | Jane Harman | D | CA-36 | January 3, 2001 | 9th term* | Previously served from 1993 to 1999. Resigned on February 28, 2011. |
| 117 | Dan Lungren | R | CA-03 | January 3, 2005 | 9th term* | Previously served from 1979 to 1989. Chair: House Administration; Defeated in 2012 general election. |
| 118 | Robert Aderholt | R | AL-04 | January 3, 1997 | 8th term | |
| 119 | Leonard Boswell | D | IA-03 | January 3, 1997 | 8th term | Defeated in 2012 general election. |
| 120 | Kevin Brady | R | TX-08 | January 3, 1997 | 8th term | |
| 121 | Danny K. Davis | D | IL-07 | January 3, 1997 | 8th term | |
| 122 | Diana DeGette | D | CO-01 | January 3, 1997 | 8th term | |
| 123 | Kay Granger | R | TX-12 | January 3, 1997 | 8th term | |
| 124 | Rubén Hinojosa | D | TX-15 | January 3, 1997 | 8th term | |
| 125 | Ron Kind | D | WI-03 | January 3, 1997 | 8th term | |
| 126 | Dennis Kucinich | D | OH-10 | January 3, 1997 | 8th term | Defeated in 2012 primary. |
| 127 | Carolyn McCarthy | D | NY-04 | January 3, 1997 | 8th term | |
| 128 | Jim McGovern | D | MA-03 | January 3, 1997 | 8th term | |
| 129 | Mike McIntyre | D | NC-07 | January 3, 1997 | 8th term | |
| 130 | Bill Pascrell | D | NJ-08 | January 3, 1997 | 8th term | |
| 131 | Joe Pitts | R | PA-16 | January 3, 1997 | 8th term | |
| 132 | Silvestre Reyes | D | TX-16 | January 3, 1997 | 8th term | Ranking Member: Intelligence; Defeated in 2012 primary. |
| 133 | Steve Rothman | D | NJ-09 | January 3, 1997 | 8th term | Defeated in 2012 primary. |
| 134 | Loretta Sanchez | D | CA-47 | January 3, 1997 | 8th term | |
| 135 | Pete Sessions | R | TX-32 | January 3, 1997 | 8th term | |
| 136 | Brad Sherman | D | CA-27 | January 3, 1997 | 8th term | |
| 137 | John Shimkus | R | IL-19 | January 3, 1997 | 8th term | |
| 138 | Adam Smith | D | WA-09 | January 3, 1997 | 8th term | Ranking Member: Armed Services |
| 139 | John F. Tierney | D | MA-06 | January 3, 1997 | 8th term | |
| 140 | Gregory Meeks | D | NY-06 | February 3, 1998 | 8th term | |
| 141 | Lois Capps | D | CA-23 | March 10, 1998 | 8th term | |
| 142 | Mary Bono Mack | R | CA-45 | April 7, 1998 | 8th term | Left the House in 2013. |
| 143 | Barbara Lee | D | CA-09 | April 7, 1998 | 8th term | |
| 144 | Bob Brady | D | PA-01 | May 19, 1998 | 8th term | Ranking Member: House Administration |
| 145 | Jay Inslee | D | WA-01 | January 3, 1999 | 8th term* | Previously served from 1993 to 1995. Resigned on March 20, 2012. |
| 146 | Steve Chabot | R | OH-01 | January 3, 2011 | 8th term* | Previously served from 1995 to 2009. |
| 147 | Tammy Baldwin | D | WI-02 | January 3, 1999 | 7th term | Retired in 2013 to become Senator. |
| 148 | Shelley Berkley | D | NV-01 | January 3, 1999 | 7th term | Retired in 2013. |
| 149 | Judy Biggert | R | IL-13 | January 3, 1999 | 7th term | Retired in 2013. |
| 150 | Mike Capuano | D | MA-08 | January 3, 1999 | 7th term | |
| 151 | Joe Crowley | D | NY-07 | January 3, 1999 | 7th term | |
| 152 | Charlie Gonzalez | D | TX-20 | January 3, 1999 | 7th term | Retired in 2013. |
| 153 | Rush Holt Jr. | D | NJ-12 | January 3, 1999 | 7th term | |
| 154 | John B. Larson | D | CT-01 | January 3, 1999 | 7th term | Democratic Caucus Chairman |
| 155 | Gary Miller | R | CA-42 | January 3, 1999 | 7th term | |
| 156 | Grace Napolitano | D | CA-38 | January 3, 1999 | 7th term | |
| 157 | Paul Ryan | R | WI-01 | January 3, 1999 | 7th term | Chair: Budget |
| 158 | Jan Schakowsky | D | IL-09 | January 3, 1999 | 7th term | |
| 159 | Mike Simpson | R | ID-02 | January 3, 1999 | 7th term | |
| 160 | Lee Terry | R | NE-02 | January 3, 1999 | 7th term | |
| 161 | Mike Thompson | D | CA-01 | January 3, 1999 | 7th term | |
| 162 | Greg Walden | R | OR-02 | January 3, 1999 | 7th term | |
| 163 | Anthony Weiner | D | NY-09 | January 3, 1999 | 7th term | Resigned on June 21, 2011. |
| 164 | David Wu | D | OR-01 | January 3, 1999 | 7th term | Resigned on August 3, 2011. |
| 165 | Joe Baca | D | CA-43 | November 16, 1999 | 7th term | Defeated in 2012 general election. |
| 166 | Charles Bass | R | NH-02 | January 3, 2011 | 7th term* | Previously served from 1995 to 2007. Defeated in 2012 general election. |
| 167 | Brian Bilbray | R | CA-50 | June 6, 2006 | 7th term* | Previously served from 1995 to 2001. Defeated in 2012 general election. |
| 168 | Todd Akin | R | MO-02 | January 3, 2001 | 6th term | Retired in 2013. |
| 169 | Eric Cantor | R | VA-07 | January 3, 2001 | 6th term | Majority Leader |
| 170 | Shelley Moore Capito | R | WV-02 | January 3, 2001 | 6th term | |
| 171 | Lacy Clay | D | MO-01 | January 3, 2001 | 6th term | |
| 172 | Ander Crenshaw | R | FL-04 | January 3, 2001 | 6th term | |
| 173 | John Culberson | R | TX-07 | January 3, 2001 | 6th term | |
| 174 | Susan Davis | D | CA-53 | January 3, 2001 | 6th term | |
| 175 | Jeff Flake | R | AZ-06 | January 3, 2001 | 6th term | Retired in 2013. |
| 176 | Sam Graves | R | MO-06 | January 3, 2001 | 6th term | Chair: Small Business |
| 177 | Mike Honda | D | CA-15 | January 3, 2001 | 6th term | |
| 178 | Steve Israel | D | NY-02 | January 3, 2001 | 6th term | |
| 179 | Darrell Issa | R | CA-49 | January 3, 2001 | 6th term | Chair: Oversight and Government Reform |
| 180 | Tim Johnson | R | IL-15 | January 3, 2001 | 6th term | Retired in 2013. |
| 181 | James Langevin | D | RI-02 | January 3, 2001 | 6th term | |
| 182 | Rick Larsen | D | WA-02 | January 3, 2001 | 6th term | |
| 183 | Betty McCollum | D | MN-04 | January 3, 2001 | 6th term | |
| 184 | Jim Matheson | D | UT-02 | January 3, 2001 | 6th term | |
| 185 | Mike Pence | R | IN-06 | January 3, 2001 | 6th term | Retired in 2013. |
| 186 | Todd Platts | R | PA-19 | January 3, 2001 | 6th term | Retired in 2013. |
| 187 | Denny Rehberg | R | MT-AL | January 3, 2001 | 6th term | Retired in 2013. |
| 188 | Mike Rogers | R | MI-08 | January 3, 2001 | 6th term | Chair: Intelligence |
| 189 | Mike Ross | D | AR-04 | January 3, 2001 | 6th term | Retired in 2013. |
| 190 | Adam Schiff | D | CA-29 | January 3, 2001 | 6th term | |
| 191 | Pat Tiberi | R | OH-12 | January 3, 2001 | 6th term | |
| 192 | Bill Shuster | R | PA-09 | May 15, 2001 | 6th term | |
| 193 | Randy Forbes | R | VA-04 | June 19, 2001 | 6th term | |
| 194 | Stephen F. Lynch | D | MA-09 | October 16, 2001 | 6th term | |
| 195 | Jeff Miller | R | FL-01 | October 16, 2001 | 6th term | Chair: Veterans' Affairs |
| 196 | Joe Wilson | R | SC-02 | December 18, 2001 | 6th term | |
| 197 | John Sullivan | R | OK-01 | February 15, 2002 | 6th term | Left the House in 2013. |
| 198 | Rodney Alexander | R | LA-05 | January 3, 2003 | 5th term | |
| 199 | Rob Bishop | R | UT-01 | January 3, 2003 | 5th term | |
| 200 | Tim Bishop | D | NY-01 | January 3, 2003 | 5th term | |
| 201 | Marsha Blackburn | R | TN-07 | January 3, 2003 | 5th term | |
| 202 | Jo Bonner | R | AL-01 | January 3, 2003 | 5th term | Chair: Ethics |
| 203 | Michael C. Burgess | R | TX-26 | January 3, 2003 | 5th term | |
| 204 | Dennis Cardoza | D | CA-18 | January 3, 2003 | 5th term | Resigned on August 15, 2012. |
| 205 | John Carter | R | TX-31 | January 3, 2003 | 5th term | |
| 206 | Tom Cole | R | OK-04 | January 3, 2003 | 5th term | |
| 207 | Mario Díaz-Balart | R | FL-21 | January 3, 2003 | 5th term | |
| 208 | Trent Franks | R | AZ-02 | January 3, 2003 | 5th term | |
| 209 | Scott Garrett | R | NJ-05 | January 3, 2003 | 5th term | |
| 210 | Jim Gerlach | R | PA-06 | January 3, 2003 | 5th term | |
| 211 | Phil Gingrey | R | GA-11 | January 3, 2003 | 5th term | |
| 212 | Raúl Grijalva | D | AZ-07 | January 3, 2003 | 5th term | |
| 213 | Jeb Hensarling | R | TX-05 | January 3, 2003 | 5th term | Republican Conference Chairman |
| 214 | Steve King | R | IA-05 | January 3, 2003 | 5th term | |
| 215 | John Kline | R | MN-02 | January 3, 2003 | 5th term | Chair: Education and the Workforce |
| 216 | Thaddeus McCotter | R | MI-11 | January 3, 2003 | 5th term | Resigned on July 6, 2012. |
| 217 | Mike Michaud | D | ME-02 | January 3, 2003 | 5th term | |
| 218 | Brad Miller | D | NC-13 | January 3, 2003 | 5th term | Retired in 2013. |
| 219 | Candice Miller | R | MI-10 | January 3, 2003 | 5th term | |
| 220 | Tim Murphy | R | PA-18 | January 3, 2003 | 5th term | |
| 221 | Devin Nunes | R | CA-21 | January 3, 2003 | 5th term | |
| 222 | Mike Rogers | R | AL-03 | January 3, 2003 | 5th term | |
| 223 | Dutch Ruppersberger | D | MD-02 | January 3, 2003 | 5th term | |
| 224 | Tim Ryan | D | OH-17 | January 3, 2003 | 5th term | |
| 225 | Linda Sánchez | D | CA-39 | January 3, 2003 | 5th term | |
| 226 | David Scott | D | GA-13 | January 3, 2003 | 5th term | |
| 227 | Mike Turner | R | OH-03 | January 3, 2003 | 5th term | |
| 228 | Chris Van Hollen | D | MD-08 | January 3, 2003 | 5th term | Ranking Member: Budget |
| 229 | Randy Neugebauer | R | TX-19 | June 3, 2003 | 5th term | |
| 230 | Ben Chandler | D | KY-06 | February 17, 2004 | 5th term | Defeated in 2012 general election. |
| 231 | G. K. Butterfield | D | NC-01 | July 20, 2004 | 5th term | |
| 232 | John Barrow | D | GA-12 | January 3, 2005 | 4th term | |
| 233 | Dan Boren | D | OK-02 | January 3, 2005 | 4th term | Retired in 2013. |
| 234 | Charles Boustany | R | LA-07 | January 3, 2005 | 4th term | |
| 235 | Russ Carnahan | D | MO-03 | January 3, 2005 | 4th term | Defeated in 2012 primary. |
| 236 | Emanuel Cleaver | D | MO-05 | January 3, 2005 | 4th term | |
| 237 | Mike Conaway | R | TX-11 | January 3, 2005 | 4th term | |
| 238 | Jim Costa | D | CA-20 | January 3, 2005 | 4th term | |
| 239 | Henry Cuellar | D | TX-28 | January 3, 2005 | 4th term | |
| 240 | Geoff Davis | R | KY-04 | January 3, 2005 | 4th term | Resigned on July 31, 2012. |
| 241 | Charlie Dent | R | PA-15 | January 3, 2005 | 4th term | |
| 242 | Jeff Fortenberry | R | NE-01 | January 3, 2005 | 4th term | |
| 243 | Virginia Foxx | R | NC-05 | January 3, 2005 | 4th term | |
| 244 | Louie Gohmert | R | TX-01 | January 3, 2005 | 4th term | |
| 245 | Al Green | D | TX-09 | January 3, 2005 | 4th term | |
| 246 | Brian Higgins | D | NY-27 | January 3, 2005 | 4th term | |
| 247 | Dan Lipinski | D | IL-03 | January 3, 2005 | 4th term | |
| 248 | Michael McCaul | R | TX-10 | January 3, 2005 | 4th term | |
| 249 | Patrick McHenry | R | NC-10 | January 3, 2005 | 4th term | |
| 250 | Cathy McMorris Rodgers | R | WA-05 | January 3, 2005 | 4th term | |
| 251 | Connie Mack IV | R | FL-14 | January 3, 2005 | 4th term | Left the House in 2013. |
| 252 | Kenny Marchant | R | TX-24 | January 3, 2005 | 4th term | |
| 253 | Gwen Moore | D | WI-04 | January 3, 2005 | 4th term | |
| 254 | Ted Poe | R | TX-02 | January 3, 2005 | 4th term | |
| 255 | Tom Price | R | GA-06 | January 3, 2005 | 4th term | |
| 256 | Dave Reichert | R | WA-08 | January 3, 2005 | 4th term | |
| 257 | Allyson Schwartz | D | PA-13 | January 3, 2005 | 4th term | |
| 258 | Debbie Wasserman Schultz | D | FL-20 | January 3, 2005 | 4th term | |
| 259 | Lynn Westmoreland | R | GA-03 | January 3, 2005 | 4th term | |
| 260 | Doris Matsui | D | CA-05 | March 8, 2005 | 5th term | |
| 261 | Jean Schmidt | R | OH-02 | August 2, 2005 | 5th term | Defeated in 2012 primary. |
| 262 | John Campbell | R | CA-48 | December 6, 2005 | 5th term | |
| 263 | Albio Sires | D | NJ-13 | November 13, 2006 | 5th term | |
| 264 | Steve Pearce | R | NM-02 | January 3, 2011 | 4th term* | Previously served from 2003 to 2009. |
| 265 | Jason Altmire | D | PA-04 | January 3, 2007 | 3rd term | Defeated in 2012 primary. |
| 266 | Michele Bachmann | R | MN-06 | January 3, 2007 | 3rd term | |
| 267 | Gus Bilirakis | R | FL-09 | January 3, 2007 | 3rd term | |
| 268 | Bruce Braley | D | IA-01 | January 3, 2007 | 3rd term | |
| 269 | Vern Buchanan | R | FL-13 | January 3, 2007 | 3rd term | |
| 270 | Kathy Castor | D | FL-11 | January 3, 2007 | 3rd term | |
| 271 | Yvette Clarke | D | NY-11 | January 3, 2007 | 3rd term | |
| 272 | Steve Cohen | D | TN-09 | January 3, 2007 | 3rd term | |
| 273 | Joe Courtney | D | CT-02 | January 3, 2007 | 3rd term | |
| 274 | Joe Donnelly | D | IN-02 | January 3, 2007 | 3rd term | Retired in 2013. |
| 275 | Keith Ellison | D | MN-05 | January 3, 2007 | 3rd term | |
| 276 | Gabby Giffords | D | AZ-08 | January 3, 2007 | 3rd term | Resigned on January 25, 2012. |
| 277 | Dean Heller | R | NV-02 | January 3, 2007 | 3rd term | Resigned on May 9, 2011. |
| 278 | Mazie Hirono | D | HI-02 | January 3, 2007 | 3rd term | Retired in 2013. |
| 279 | Hank Johnson | D | GA-04 | January 3, 2007 | 3rd term | |
| 280 | Jim Jordan | R | OH-04 | January 3, 2007 | 3rd term | |
| 281 | Doug Lamborn | R | CO-05 | January 3, 2007 | 3rd term | |
| 282 | Dave Loebsack | D | IA-02 | January 3, 2007 | 3rd term | |
| 283 | Kevin McCarthy | R | CA-22 | January 3, 2007 | 3rd term | Majority Whip |
| 284 | Jerry McNerney | D | CA-11 | January 3, 2007 | 3rd term | |
| 285 | Chris Murphy | D | CT-05 | January 3, 2007 | 3rd term | Retired in 2013. |
| 286 | Ed Perlmutter | D | CO-07 | January 3, 2007 | 3rd term | |
| 287 | Peter Roskam | R | IL-06 | January 3, 2007 | 3rd term | |
| 288 | John Sarbanes | D | MD-03 | January 3, 2007 | 3rd term | |
| 289 | Heath Shuler | D | NC-11 | January 3, 2007 | 3rd term | Retired in 2013. |
| 290 | Adrian Smith | R | NE-03 | January 3, 2007 | 3rd term | |
| 291 | Betty Sutton | D | OH-13 | January 3, 2007 | 3rd term | Defeated in 2012 general election. |
| 292 | Tim Walz | D | MN-01 | January 3, 2007 | 3rd term | |
| 293 | Peter Welch | D | VT-AL | January 3, 2007 | 3rd term | |
| 294 | John Yarmuth | D | KY-03 | January 3, 2007 | 3rd term | |
| 295 | Paul Broun | R | GA-10 | July 17, 2007 | 3rd term | |
| 296 | Laura Richardson | D | CA-37 | August 21, 2007 | 3rd term | Defeated in 2012 general election. |
| 297 | Niki Tsongas | D | MA-05 | October 16, 2007 | 3rd term | |
| 298 | Bob Latta | R | OH-05 | December 11, 2007 | 3rd term | |
| 299 | Rob Wittman | R | VA-01 | December 11, 2007 | 3rd term | |
| 300 | André Carson | D | IN-07 | March 11, 2008 | 3rd term | |
| 301 | Jackie Speier | D | CA-12 | April 8, 2008 | 3rd term | |
| 302 | Steve Scalise | R | LA-01 | May 3, 2008 | 3rd term | |
| 303 | Donna Edwards | D | MD-04 | June 17, 2008 | 3rd term | |
| 304 | Marcia Fudge | D | OH-11 | November 18, 2008 | 3rd term | |
| 305 | Steve Austria | R | OH-07 | January 3, 2009 | 2nd term | Retired in 2013. |
| 306 | Bill Cassidy | R | LA-06 | January 3, 2009 | 2nd term | |
| 307 | Jason Chaffetz | R | UT-03 | January 3, 2009 | 2nd term | |
| 308 | Mike Coffman | R | CO-06 | January 3, 2009 | 2nd term | |
| 309 | Gerry Connolly | D | VA-11 | January 3, 2009 | 2nd term | |
| 310 | John Fleming | R | LA-04 | January 3, 2009 | 2nd term | |
| 311 | Brett Guthrie | R | KY-02 | January 3, 2009 | 2nd term | |
| 312 | Gregg Harper | R | MS-03 | January 3, 2009 | 2nd term | |
| 313 | Martin Heinrich | D | NM-01 | January 3, 2009 | 2nd term | Retired in 2013. |
| 314 | Jim Himes | D | CT-04 | January 3, 2009 | 2nd term | |
| 315 | Duncan D. Hunter | R | CA-52 | January 3, 2009 | 2nd term | |
| 316 | Lynn Jenkins | R | KS-02 | January 3, 2009 | 2nd term | |
| 317 | Larry Kissell | D | NC-08 | January 3, 2009 | 2nd term | Defeated in 2012 general election. |
| 318 | Leonard Lance | R | NJ-07 | January 3, 2009 | 2nd term | |
| 319 | Chris Lee | R | NY-26 | January 3, 2009 | 2nd term | Resigned on February 9, 2011. |
| 320 | Blaine Luetkemeyer | R | MO-09 | January 3, 2009 | 2nd term | |
| 321 | Ben Ray Luján | D | NM-03 | January 3, 2009 | 2nd term | |
| 322 | Cynthia Lummis | R | WY-AL | January 3, 2009 | 2nd term | |
| 323 | Tom McClintock | R | CA-04 | January 3, 2009 | 2nd term | |
| 324 | Pete Olson | R | TX-22 | January 3, 2009 | 2nd term | |
| 325 | Erik Paulsen | R | MN-03 | January 3, 2009 | 2nd term | |
| 326 | Gary Peters | D | MI-09 | January 3, 2009 | 2nd term | |
| 327 | Chellie Pingree | D | ME-01 | January 3, 2009 | 2nd term | |
| 328 | Jared Polis | D | CO-02 | January 3, 2009 | 2nd term | |
| 329 | Bill Posey | R | FL-15 | January 3, 2009 | 2nd term | |
| 330 | Phil Roe | R | TN-01 | January 3, 2009 | 2nd term | |
| 331 | Tom Rooney | R | FL-16 | January 3, 2009 | 2nd term | |
| 332 | Aaron Schock | R | IL-18 | January 3, 2009 | 2nd term | |
| 333 | Kurt Schrader | D | OR-05 | January 3, 2009 | 2nd term | |
| 334 | Glenn Thompson | R | PA-05 | January 3, 2009 | 2nd term | |
| 335 | Paul Tonko | D | NY-21 | January 3, 2009 | 2nd term | |
| 336 | Mike Quigley | D | IL-05 | April 7, 2009 | 2nd term | |
| 337 | Judy Chu | D | CA-32 | July 14, 2009 | 2nd term | |
| 338 | John Garamendi | D | CA-10 | November 3, 2009 | 2nd term | |
| 339 | Bill Owens | D | NY-23 | November 3, 2009 | 2nd term | |
| 340 | Ted Deutch | D | FL-19 | April 13, 2010 | 2nd term | |
| 341 | Mark Critz | D | PA-12 | May 18, 2010 | 2nd term | Defeated in 2012 general election. |
| 342 | Tom Graves | R | GA-09 | June 8, 2010 | 2nd term | |
| 343 | Tom Reed | R | NY-29 | November 18, 2010 | 2nd term | |
| 344 | Marlin Stutzman | R | IN-03 | November 18, 2010 | 2nd term | |
| 345 | Mike Fitzpatrick | R | PA-08 | January 3, 2011 | 2nd term* | Previously served from 2005 to 2007. |
| 346 | Tim Walberg | R | MI-07 | January 3, 2011 | 2nd term* | Previously served from 2007 to 2009. |
| 347 | Sandy Adams | R | FL-24 | January 3, 2011 | 1st term | Defeated in 2012 primary. |
| 348 | Justin Amash | R | MI-03 | January 3, 2011 | 1st term | |
| 349 | Lou Barletta | R | PA-11 | January 3, 2011 | 1st term | |
| 350 | Karen Bass | D | CA-33 | January 3, 2011 | 1st term | |
| 351 | Dan Benishek | R | MI-01 | January 3, 2011 | 1st term | |
| 352 | Rick Berg | R | ND-AL | January 3, 2011 | 1st term | Retired in 2013. |
| 353 | Diane Black | R | TN-06 | January 3, 2011 | 1st term | |
| 354 | Mo Brooks | R | AL-05 | January 3, 2011 | 1st term | |
| 355 | Larry Bucshon | R | IN-08 | January 3, 2011 | 1st term | |
| 356 | Ann Marie Buerkle | R | NY-25 | January 3, 2011 | 1st term | Defeated in 2012 general election. |
| 357 | Quico Canseco | R | TX-23 | January 3, 2011 | 1st term | Retired in 2013. |
| 358 | John Carney | D | DE-AL | January 3, 2011 | 1st term | |
| 359 | David Cicilline | D | RI-01 | January 3, 2011 | 1st term | |
| 360 | Hansen Clarke | D | MI-13 | January 3, 2011 | 1st term | Retired in 2013. |
| 361 | Chip Cravaack | R | MN-08 | January 3, 2011 | 1st term | Defeated in 2012 general election. |
| 362 | Rick Crawford | R | AR-01 | January 3, 2011 | 1st term | |
| 363 | Jeff Denham | R | CA-19 | January 3, 2011 | 1st term | |
| 364 | Scott DesJarlais | R | TN-04 | January 3, 2011 | 1st term | |
| 365 | Bob Dold | R | IL-10 | January 3, 2011 | 1st term | Defeated in 2012 general election. |
| 366 | Sean Duffy | R | WI-07 | January 3, 2011 | 1st term | |
| 367 | Jeff Duncan | R | SC-03 | January 3, 2011 | 1st term | |
| 368 | Renee Ellmers | R | NC-02 | January 3, 2011 | 1st term | |
| 369 | Blake Farenthold | R | TX-27 | January 3, 2011 | 1st term | |
| 370 | Stephen Fincher | R | TN-08 | January 3, 2011 | 1st term | |
| 371 | Chuck Fleischmann | R | TN-03 | January 3, 2011 | 1st term | |
| 372 | Bill Flores | R | TX-17 | January 3, 2011 | 1st term | |
| 373 | Cory Gardner | R | CO-04 | January 3, 2011 | 1st term | |
| 374 | Bob Gibbs | R | OH-18 | January 3, 2011 | 1st term | |
| 375 | Chris Gibson | R | NY-20 | January 3, 2011 | 1st term | |
| 376 | Paul Gosar | R | AZ-01 | January 3, 2011 | 1st term | |
| 377 | Trey Gowdy | R | SC-04 | January 3, 2011 | 1st term | |
| 378 | Tim Griffin | R | AR-02 | January 3, 2011 | 1st term | |
| 379 | Morgan Griffith | R | VA-09 | January 3, 2011 | 1st term | |
| 380 | Michael Grimm | R | NY-13 | January 3, 2011 | 1st term | |
| 381 | Frank Guinta | R | NH-01 | January 3, 2011 | 1st term | Defeated in 2012 general election. |
| 382 | Colleen Hanabusa | D | HI-01 | January 3, 2011 | 1st term | |
| 383 | Richard L. Hanna | R | NY-24 | January 3, 2011 | 1st term | |
| 384 | Andy Harris | R | MD-01 | January 3, 2011 | 1st term | |
| 385 | Vicky Hartzler | R | MO-04 | January 3, 2011 | 1st term | |
| 386 | Nan Hayworth | R | NY-19 | January 3, 2011 | 1st term | Defeated in 2012 general election. |
| 387 | Joe Heck | R | NV-03 | January 3, 2011 | 1st term | |
| 388 | Jaime Herrera Beutler | R | WA-03 | January 3, 2011 | 1st term | |
| 389 | Tim Huelskamp | R | KS-01 | January 3, 2011 | 1st term | |
| 390 | Bill Huizenga | R | MI-02 | January 3, 2011 | 1st term | |
| 391 | Randy Hultgren | R | IL-14 | January 3, 2011 | 1st term | |
| 392 | Robert Hurt | R | VA-05 | January 3, 2011 | 1st term | |
| 393 | Bill Johnson | R | OH-06 | January 3, 2011 | 1st term | |
| 394 | Bill Keating | D | MA-10 | January 3, 2011 | 1st term | |
| 395 | Mike Kelly | R | PA-03 | January 3, 2011 | 1st term | |
| 396 | Adam Kinzinger | R | IL-11 | January 3, 2011 | 1st term | |
| 397 | Raúl Labrador | R | ID-01 | January 3, 2011 | 1st term | |
| 398 | Jeff Landry | R | LA-03 | January 3, 2011 | 1st term | Defeated in 2012 general election. |
| 399 | James Lankford | R | OK-05 | January 3, 2011 | 1st term | |
| 400 | Billy Long | R | MO-07 | January 3, 2011 | 1st term | |
| 401 | David McKinley | R | WV-01 | January 3, 2011 | 1st term | |
| 402 | Tom Marino | R | PA-10 | January 3, 2011 | 1st term | |
| 403 | Pat Meehan | R | PA-07 | January 3, 2011 | 1st term | |
| 404 | Mick Mulvaney | R | SC-05 | January 3, 2011 | 1st term | |
| 405 | Kristi Noem | R | SD-AL | January 3, 2011 | 1st term | |
| 406 | Rich Nugent | R | FL-05 | January 3, 2011 | 1st term | |
| 407 | Alan Nunnelee | R | MS-01 | January 3, 2011 | 1st term | |
| 408 | Steven Palazzo | R | MS-04 | January 3, 2011 | 1st term | |
| 409 | Mike Pompeo | R | KS-04 | January 3, 2011 | 1st term | |
| 410 | Ben Quayle | R | AZ-03 | January 3, 2011 | 1st term | Defeated in 2012 primary. |
| 411 | Jim Renacci | R | OH-16 | January 3, 2011 | 1st term | |
| 412 | Reid Ribble | R | WI-08 | January 3, 2011 | 1st term | |
| 413 | Cedric Richmond | D | LA-02 | January 3, 2011 | 1st term | |
| 414 | Scott Rigell | R | VA-02 | January 3, 2011 | 1st term | |
| 415 | David Rivera | R | FL-25 | January 3, 2011 | 1st term | Defeated in 2012 general election. |
| 416 | Martha Roby | R | AL-02 | January 3, 2011 | 1st term | |
| 417 | Todd Rokita | R | IN-04 | January 3, 2011 | 1st term | |
| 418 | Dennis Ross | R | FL-12 | January 3, 2011 | 1st term | |
| 419 | Jon Runyan Sr. | R | NJ-03 | January 3, 2011 | 1st term | |
| 420 | Bobby Schilling | R | IL-17 | January 3, 2011 | 1st term | Defeated in 2012 general election. |
| 421 | David Schweikert | R | AZ-05 | January 3, 2011 | 1st term | |
| 422 | Austin Scott | R | GA-08 | January 3, 2011 | 1st term | |
| 423 | Tim Scott | R | SC-01 | January 3, 2011 | 1st term | Resigned on January 2, 2013. |
| 424 | Terri Sewell | D | AL-07 | January 3, 2011 | 1st term | |
| 425 | Steve Southerland | R | FL-02 | January 3, 2011 | 1st term | |
| 426 | Steve Stivers | R | OH-15 | January 3, 2011 | 1st term | |
| 427 | Scott Tipton | R | CO-03 | January 3, 2011 | 1st term | |
| 428 | Joe Walsh | R | IL-08 | January 3, 2011 | 1st term | Defeated in 2012 general election. |
| 429 | Daniel Webster | R | FL-08 | January 3, 2011 | 1st term | |
| 430 | Allen West | R | FL-22 | January 3, 2011 | 1st term | Retired in 2013. |
| 431 | Frederica Wilson | D | FL-17 | January 3, 2011 | 1st term | |
| 432 | Steve Womack | R | AR-03 | January 3, 2011 | 1st term | |
| 433 | Rob Woodall | R | GA-07 | January 3, 2011 | 1st term | |
| 434 | Kevin Yoder | R | KS-03 | January 3, 2011 | 1st term | |
| 435 | Todd Young | R | IN-09 | January 3, 2011 | 1st term | |
| | Kathy Hochul | D | NY-26 | June 1, 2011 | 1st term | Defeated in 2012 general election. |
| | Janice Hahn | D | CA-36 | July 12, 2011 | 1st term | |
| | Mark Amodei | R | NV-02 | September 13, 2011 | 1st term | |
| | Bob Turner | R | NY-09 | September 13, 2011 | 1st term | Left the House in 2013. |
| | Suzanne Bonamici | D | OR-01 | January 31, 2012 | 1st term | |
| | Ron Barber | D | AZ-08 | June 12, 2012 | 1st term | |
| | David Curson | D | MI-11 | November 6, 2012 | 1st term | Left the House in 2013. |
| | Suzan DelBene | D | WA-01 | November 6, 2012 | 1st term | |
| | Thomas Massie | R | KY-04 | November 6, 2012 | 1st term | |
| | Donald Payne Jr. | D | NJ-10 | November 6, 2012 | 1st term | |

== Delegates ==
| Rank | Delegate | Party | District | Seniority date (Previous service, if any) | Term # | Notes |
|---|---|---|---|---|---|---|
| 1 | Eni Faleomavaega | D | AS | January 3, 1989 | 12th term | |
| 2 | Eleanor Holmes Norton | D | DC | January 3, 1991 | 11th term | |
| 3 | Donna Christian-Christensen | D | VI | January 3, 1997 | 8th term | |
| 4 | Madeleine Bordallo | D | GU | January 3, 2003 | 5th term | |
| 5 | Pedro Pierluisi | D | PR | January 3, 2009 | 2nd term | |
| 6 | Gregorio Sablan | D | NMI | January 3, 2009 | 2nd term | |

== See also ==
- 112th United States Congress
- List of United States congressional districts
- List of United States senators in the 112th Congress
