= List of United States senators in the 112th Congress =

This is a complete list of United States senators during the 112th United States Congress listed by seniority from January 3, 2011, to January 3, 2013. It is a historical listing and will contain people who have not served the entire two-year Congress should anyone resign, die, or be expelled.

Order of service is based on the commencement of the senator's first term. Behind this is former service as a senator (only giving the senator seniority within their new incoming class), service as vice president, a House member, a cabinet secretary, or a governor of a state. The final factor is the population of the senator's state.

Senators who were sworn in during the middle of the two-year Congress (up until the last senator who was not sworn in early after winning the November 2012 election) are listed at the end of the list with no number.

In the 112th Congress, Tom Harkin is the most senior junior senator, and Jeanne Shaheen is the most junior senior senator.

== Terms of service ==
Class	Terms of service of senators that expired in years
Class 1	Terms of service of senators that expired in 2013 (AZ, CA, CT, DE, FL, HI, IN, MA, MD, ME, MI, MN, MO, MS, MT, ND, NE, NJ, NM, NV, NY, OH, PA, RI, TN, TX, UT, VA, VT, WA, WI, WV and WY.)
Class 2	Terms of service of senators that expired in 2015 (AK, AL, AR, CO, DE, GA, IA, ID, IL, KS, KY, LA, MA, ME, MI, MN, MS, MT, NC, NE, NH, NJ, NM, OK, OR, RI, SC, SD, TN, TX, VA, WV, and WY.)
Class 3	Terms of service of senators that expired in 2017 (AK, AL, AR, AZ, CA, CO, CT, FL, GA, HI, IA, ID, IL, IN, KS, KY, LA, MD, MO, NC, ND, NH, NV, NY, OH, OK, OR, PA, SC, SD, UT, VT, WA, and WI.)

== U.S. Senate seniority list ==
Rank	Historical rank	Senator	Party	State	Seniority date	Other factors
1	1614	Daniel Inouye (Note: In Hawaii, Daniel Inouye (D) died on December 17, 2012. He was replaced by Brian Schatz (D), who was appointed by Governor Neil Abercrombie in the final weeks of the Congress.)	Democratic	Hawaii	January 3, 1963	
2	1692	Patrick Leahy	Democratic	Vermont	January 3, 1975	
3	1705	Richard Lugar	Republican	Indiana	January 3, 1977	Indiana 11th in population (1970)
4	1708	Orrin Hatch	Republican	Utah	January 3, 1977	Utah 36th in population (1970)
5	1717	Max Baucus	Democratic	Montana	December 15, 1978	
6	1719	Thad Cochran	Republican	Mississippi	December 27, 1978	
7	1730	Carl Levin	Democratic	Michigan	January 3, 1979	
8	1743	Chuck Grassley	Republican	Iowa	January 3, 1981	
9	1758	Jeff Bingaman	Democratic	New Mexico	January 3, 1983	
10	1761	John Kerry	Democratic	Massachusetts	January 2, 1985	
11	1763	Tom Harkin	Democratic	Iowa	January 3, 1985	Former member of the U.S. House of Representatives
12	1766	Mitch McConnell	Republican	Kentucky	January 3, 1985	
13	1767	Jay Rockefeller	Democratic	West Virginia	January 15, 1985	
14	1773	Barbara Mikulski	Democratic	Maryland	January 3, 1987	Former member of the U.S. House of Representatives (10 years)
15	1775	Richard Shelby	Republican	Alabama	January 3, 1987	Former member of the U.S. House of Representatives (8 years)
16	1777	John McCain	Republican	Arizona	January 3, 1987	Former member of the U.S. House of Representatives (4 years); Arizona 29th in population (1980)
17	1778	Harry Reid	Democratic	Nevada	January 3, 1987	Former member of the U.S. House of Representatives (4 years); Nevada 43rd in population (1980)
18	1781	Kent Conrad	Democratic	North Dakota	January 3, 1987	
19	1790	Herb Kohl	Democratic	Wisconsin	January 3, 1989	Wisconsin 16th in population (1980)
20	1791	Joe Lieberman (Note: Despite Joe Lieberman's 2006 party change, he retains his seniority since there is no break in his Senate service.)	Independent Democrat	Connecticut	January 3, 1989	Connecticut 25th in population (1980)
21	1793	Daniel Akaka	Democratic	Hawaii	May 16, 1990	
22	1801	Dianne Feinstein	Democratic	California	November 10, 1992	
23	1804	Barbara Boxer	Democratic	California	January 3, 1993	Former member of the U.S. House of Representatives
24	1812	Patty Murray	Democratic	Washington	January 3, 1993	
25	1815	Kay Bailey Hutchison	Republican	Texas	June 14, 1993	
26	1816	Jim Inhofe	Republican	Oklahoma	November 17, 1994	
27	1818	Olympia Snowe	Republican	Maine	January 3, 1995	Former member of the U.S. House of Representatives (16 years)
28	1819	Jon Kyl	Republican	Arizona	January 3, 1995	Former member of the U.S. House of Representatives (8 years)
29	1827	Ron Wyden	Democratic	Oregon	February 6, 1996	
30	1830	Pat Roberts	Republican	Kansas	January 3, 1997	Former member of the U.S. House of Representatives (16 years)
31	1831	Dick Durbin	Democratic	Illinois	January 3, 1997	Former member of the U.S. House of Representatives (14 years)
32	1833	Tim Johnson	Democratic	South Dakota	January 3, 1997	Former member of the U.S. House of Representatives (10 years)
33	1835	Jack Reed	Democratic	Rhode Island	January 3, 1997	Former member of the U.S. House of Representatives (6 years)
34	1838	Mary Landrieu	Democratic	Louisiana	January 3, 1997	Louisiana 21st in population (1990)
35	1839	Jeff Sessions	Republican	Alabama	January 3, 1997	Alabama 22nd in population (1990)
36	1842	Susan Collins	Republican	Maine	January 3, 1997	Maine 38th in population (1990)
37	1843	Mike Enzi	Republican	Wyoming	January 3, 1997	Wyoming 50th in population (1990)
38	1844	Chuck Schumer	Democratic	New York	January 3, 1999	Former member of the U.S. House of Representatives (18 years)
39	1846	Mike Crapo	Republican	Idaho	January 3, 1999	Former member of the U.S. House of Representatives (6 years)
40	1854	Bill Nelson	Democratic	Florida	January 3, 2001	Former member of the U.S. House of Representatives (12 years)
41	1855	Tom Carper	Democratic	Delaware	January 3, 2001	Former member of the U.S. House of Representatives (10 years)
42	1856	Debbie Stabenow	Democratic	Michigan	January 3, 2001	Former member of the U.S. House of Representatives (4 years); Michigan 8th in population (1990)
43	1857	John Ensign (Note: In Nevada, John Ensign (R) resigned on May 3, 2011 due to an investigation by the Ethics Committee. He was replaced by Dean Heller (R), who was appointed by Governor Brian Sandoval.)	Republican	Nevada	January 3, 2001	Former member of the U.S. House of Representatives (4 years); Nevada 39th in population (1990)
44	1859	Maria Cantwell	Democratic	Washington	January 3, 2001	Former member of the U.S. House of Representatives (2 years)
45	1860	Ben Nelson	Democratic	Nebraska	January 3, 2001	Former governor
46	1867	John Cornyn	Republican	Texas	December 2, 2002	
47	1868	Lisa Murkowski	Republican	Alaska	December 20, 2002	
48	1755 (Note: Frank Lautenberg (D) previously served a term as U.S. senator from New Jersey from December 1982 to January 2001, but does not retain seniority from that prior service. Lautenberg has sought restoration of his seniority based on his prior service, but has not received it. Second Time Isn't as Lovely for Lautenberg, New York Times)	Frank Lautenberg	Democratic	New Jersey	January 3, 2003	Former senator
49	1869	Saxby Chambliss	Republican	Georgia	January 3, 2003	Former member of the U.S. House of Representatives (8 years); Georgia 10th in population (2000)
50	1870	Lindsey Graham	Republican	South Carolina	January 3, 2003	Former member of the U.S. House of Representatives (8 years); South Carolina 26th in population (2000)
51	1872	Lamar Alexander	Republican	Tennessee	January 3, 2003	Former cabinet member
52	1875	Mark Pryor	Democratic	Arkansas	January 3, 2003	
53	1876	Richard Burr	Republican	North Carolina	January 3, 2005	Former member of the U.S. House of Representatives (10 years)
54	1877	Jim DeMint (Note: In South Carolina, Jim DeMint (R) resigned on January 2, 2013 nearly the end of this Congress after being appointed President of the Heritage Foundation. He was replaced by Tim Scott (R), who was appointed by Governor Nikki Haley.)	Republican	South Carolina	January 3, 2005	Former member of the U.S. House of Representatives (6 years); South Carolina 26th in population (2000)
55	1878	Tom Coburn	Republican	Oklahoma	January 3, 2005	Former member of the U.S. House of Representatives (6 years); Oklahoma 27th in population (2000)
56	1879	John Thune	Republican	South Dakota	January 3, 2005	Former member of the U.S. House of Representatives (6 years); South Dakota 46th in population (2000)
57	1880	Johnny Isakson	Republican	Georgia	January 3, 2005	Former member of the U.S. House of Representatives (5 years, 10 months)
58	1881	David Vitter	Republican	Louisiana	January 3, 2005	Former member of the U.S. House of Representatives (5 years, 7 months)
59	1885	Bob Menendez	Democratic	New Jersey	January 17, 2006	
60	1886	Ben Cardin	Democratic	Maryland	January 3, 2007	Former member of the U.S. House of Representatives (20 years)
61	1887	Bernie Sanders	Independent	Vermont	January 3, 2007	Former member of the U.S. House of Representatives (16 years)
62	1888	Sherrod Brown	Democratic	Ohio	January 3, 2007	Former member of the U.S. House of Representatives (14 years)
63	1889	Bob Casey, Jr.	Democratic	Pennsylvania	January 3, 2007	Pennsylvania 6th in population (2000)
64	1890	Jim Webb (Note: Jim Webb's service as Secretary of the Navy does not affect his seniority because it was not a cabinet-level position during or after his term.)	Democratic	Virginia	January 3, 2007	Virginia 12th in population (2000)
65	1891	Bob Corker	Republican	Tennessee	January 3, 2007	Tennessee 16th in population (2000)
66	1892	Claire McCaskill	Democratic	Missouri	January 3, 2007	Missouri 17th in population (2000)
67	1893	Amy Klobuchar	Democratic	Minnesota	January 3, 2007	Minnesota 21st in population (2000)
68	1894	Sheldon Whitehouse	Democratic	Rhode Island	January 3, 2007	Rhode Island 43rd in population (2000)
69	1895	Jon Tester	Democratic	Montana	January 3, 2007	Montana 44th in population (2000)
70	1896	John Barrasso	Republican	Wyoming	June 25, 2007	
71	1897	Roger Wicker	Republican	Mississippi	December 31, 2007	
72	1898	Mark Udall	Democratic	Colorado	January 3, 2009	Former member of the U.S. House of Representatives (10 years); Colorado 24th in population (2000)
73	1899	Tom Udall	Democratic	New Mexico	January 3, 2009	Former member of the U.S. House of Representatives (10 years); New Mexico 36th in population (2000)
74	1900	Mike Johanns	Republican	Nebraska	January 3, 2009	Former cabinet member
75	1901	Jeanne Shaheen	Democratic	New Hampshire	January 3, 2009	Former governor (6 years)
76	1902	Mark Warner	Democratic	Virginia	January 3, 2009	Former governor (4 years)
77	1903	Jim Risch	Republican	Idaho	January 3, 2009	Former governor (7 months)
78	1904	Kay Hagan	Democratic	North Carolina	January 3, 2009	North Carolina 11th in population (2000)
79	1905	Jeff Merkley	Democratic	Oregon	January 3, 2009	Oregon 28th in population (2000)
80	1906	Mark Begich	Democratic	Alaska	January 3, 2009	Alaska 48th in population (2000)
81	1909	Michael Bennet	Democratic	Colorado	January 21, 2009	
82	1910	Kirsten Gillibrand	Democratic	New York	January 26, 2009	
83	1911	Al Franken	Democratic	Minnesota	July 7, 2009	
84	1914	Scott Brown	Republican	Massachusetts	February 4, 2010	
85	1916	Joe Manchin	Democratic	West Virginia	November 15, 2010	Former governor
86	1917	Chris Coons	Democratic	Delaware	November 15, 2010	
87	1918	Mark Kirk	Republican	Illinois	November 29, 2010	
88	1785 (Note: Dan Coats (R) previously served as a U.S. senator from January 1989 to January 1999.)	Dan Coats	Republican	Indiana	January 3, 2011	Former U.S. senator
89	1919	Roy Blunt	Republican	Missouri	January 3, 2011	Former member of the U.S. House of Representatives (14 years); Missouri 17th in population (2000)
90	1920	Jerry Moran	Republican	Kansas	January 3, 2011	Former member of the U.S. House of Representatives (14 years); Kansas 32nd in population (2000)
91	1921	Rob Portman	Republican	Ohio	January 3, 2011	Former member of the U.S. House of Representatives (12 years)
92	1922	John Boozman	Republican	Arkansas	January 3, 2011	Former U.S. Representative (9 years)
93	1923	Pat Toomey	Republican	Pennsylvania	January 3, 2011	Former U.S. Representative (6 years)
94	1924	John Hoeven	Republican	North Dakota	January 3, 2011	Former governor
95	1925	Marco Rubio	Republican	Florida	January 3, 2011	Florida 4th in population (2000)
96	1926	Ron Johnson	Republican	Wisconsin	January 3, 2011	Wisconsin 18th in population (2000)
97	1927	Rand Paul	Republican	Kentucky	January 3, 2011	Kentucky 25th in population (2000)
98	1928	Richard Blumenthal	Democratic	Connecticut	January 3, 2011	Connecticut 29th in population (2000)
99	1929	Mike Lee	Republican	Utah	January 3, 2011	Utah 34th in population (2000)
100	1930	Kelly Ayotte	Republican	New Hampshire	January 3, 2011	New Hampshire 41st in population (2000)
	1931	Dean Heller	Republican	Nevada	May 9, 2011	
	1932	Brian Schatz	Democratic	Hawaii	December 26, 2012	
	1933	Tim Scott	Republican	South Carolina	January 2, 2013	

The most senior senators by class were Richard Lugar (R-Indiana) from Class 1, Max Baucus (D-Montana) from Class 2, and Daniel Inouye (D-Hawaii) from Class 3. Inouye died on December 17, 2012, with Patrick Leahy (D-Vermont) became the senior senator in his class on the final days of the current congress.

== See also ==
- 112th United States Congress
- List of United States representatives in the 112th Congress
