= 2010 United States House of Representatives election ratings =

Predictions for select races in the 2010 U.S. House elections

The 2010 United States House of Representatives elections were held on November 2, 2010, with early voting taking place in some states in the weeks preceding that date. Voters chose representatives from all 435 congressional districts across each of the 50 U.S. states. Non-voting delegates from the District of Columbia and four of the five inhabited U.S. territories (Note: Not including the Resident Commissioner of Puerto Rico, who serves a four-year term.) were also elected. These midterm elections took place nearly halfway through the first term of Democratic President Barack Obama. The winners served in the 112th United States Congress, with seats apportioned among the states based on the 2000 United States census. On Election Day, Democrats had held a House majority since January 2007 as a result of the 2006 elections.

== Predictions on overall outcome ==

These were predictions of the outcome of the 2010 United States House of Representatives elections.

- RealClearPolitics.
  - As of November 2, 2010, RCP projected the Republicans would take 224 seats, the Democrats would take 167, and 44 races were toss-ups.
- Nate Silver, FiveThirtyEight (New York Times)
  - As of November 2, 2010, Nate Silver's prediction model projected the Republicans would win (on average) 232.2 seats, and the Democrats would win 202.8.
- Patrick Ishmael, Hot Air.com
  - Ishmael predicted on October 31, 2010, that Republicans would win a net of 63 seats, +/- 3 seats. Rasmussen Reports cited Ishmael's calls in its election preview. The week before, Ishmael predicted a net Republican pickup of 62–65 seats.
- Crystal Ball
  - As of November 1, 2010, Larry Sabato predicted, "If the election were held today: + 55 Republican House seats".
- Charlie Cook
  - On October 26, 2010, The Cook Political Report raised its House forecast to "a Democratic net loss of 48 to 60 seats, with higher losses possible."
  - In a February 2010 interview with National Journal, he said that "it's very hard to come up with a scenario where Democrats don't lose the House. It's very hard."
- Rasmussen Reports
  - On November 1, 2010, Scott Rasmussen predicted the Democrats "will likely lose 55 or more seats in the House."
- Rothenberg Political Report.
  - On October 28, 2010, Rothenberg Political Report predicted "Likely Republican gain of 55–65 seats, with gains at or above 70 seats possible."
  - In April 2010, Stuart Rothenberg wrote on his blog that "...the atmospherics remain strongly behind the GOP, and major Republican House gains are extremely likely" and that "it's clear that the battleground is almost entirely on Democratic soil. Obviously, control of the House is at risk."
- Congressional Quarterly.
  - In October 2010, Congressional Quarterly projected the Democrats would take 195 seats, the Republicans 199, and they considered 41 races too close to call.
  - In July 2010, Congressional Quarterly projected the Democrats would take 205 seats, the Republicans 190, and they considered 40 races too close to call.

== Election ratings ==
Several sites and individuals publish ratings of competitive seats. The seats listed below were considered competitive (not "safe" or "solid") by at least one of the rating groups. These ratings are based upon factors such as the strength of the incumbent (if the incumbent is running for re-election), the strength of the candidates, and the partisan history of the district (the Cook Partisan Voting Index is one example of this metric). Each rating describes the likelihood of a given outcome in the election.

Most election ratings use:

- Tossup: no advantage
- Tilt (sometimes used): slight advantage
- Lean: clear advantage
- Likely: strong, but not certain advantage
- Safe: outcome is nearly certain

The following table contains the final ratings of the competitiveness of selected races according to noted political analysts. Races which were considered safe for the incumbent's party are not included. Incumbents who did not run for re-election have parentheses around their name.

District	CPVI	Incumbent	Previous result	Cook November 1, 2010	Rothenberg November 1, 2010	Sabato November 1, 2010	RCP November 1, 2010	CQ Politics October 28, 2010	NYT November 1, 2010	538 November 1, 2010	Winner
Alabama 2	R+16	Bobby Bright (D)	50.23% D	Tossup	Tilt R (flip)	Lean D	Tossup	Tossup	Tossup	Lean R (flip)	Martha Roby (R)
Alabama 5	R+12	Parker Griffith (R) (lost renomination)	51.52% D	Likely R	Safe R	Likely R	Likely R	Safe R	Safe R	Likely R	Mo Brooks (R)
Arizona 1	R+6	Ann Kirkpatrick (D)	55.88% D	Lean R (flip)	Lean R (flip)	Lean R (flip)	Lean R (flip)	Lean R (flip)	Lean R (flip)	Likely R (flip)	Paul Gosar (R)
Arizona 3	R+9	John Shadegg (R) (retiring)	54.07% R	Lean R	Safe R	Lean R	Lean R	Lean R	Tossup	Likely R	Ben Quayle (R)
Arizona 5	R+5	Harry Mitchell (D)	53.15% D	Tossup	Tilt R (flip)	Lean R (flip)	Lean R (flip)	Tossup	Tossup	Lean R (flip)	David Schweikert (R)
Arizona 7	D+6	Raúl Grijalva (D)	63.26% D	Tossup	Lean D	Lean D	Lean D	Tossup	Tossup	Likely D	Raúl Grijalva (D)
Arizona 8	R+4	Gabby Giffords (D)	54.72% D	Tossup	Tossup	Lean D	Tossup	Tossup	Tossup	Lean D	Gabby Giffords (D)
Arkansas 1	R+8	Robert Marion Berry (D) (retiring)	100.0% D	Lean R (flip)	Tilt R (flip)	Lean R (flip)	Lean R (flip)	Tossup	Lean R (flip)	Likely R (flip)	Rick Crawford (R)
Arkansas 2	R+5	Vic Snyder (D) (retiring)	76.54% D	Likely R (flip)	Likely R (flip)	Likely R (flip)	Likely R (flip)	Likely R (flip)	Safe R (flip)	Safe R (flip)	Tim Griffin (R)
Arkansas 4	R+7	Mike Ross (D)	86.17% D	Likely D	Safe D	Safe D	Likely D	Safe D	Lean D	Safe D	Mike Ross (D)
California 3	R+6	Dan Lungren (R)	49.49% R	Lean R	Lean R	Lean R	Lean R	Lean R	Lean R	Likely R	Dan Lungren (R)
California 11	R+1	Jerry McNerney (D)	55.27% D	Tossup	Tossup	Lean R (flip)	Lean R (flip)	Tossup	Tossup	Lean R (flip)	Jerry McNerney (D)
California 18	D+4	Dennis Cardoza (D)	100.0% D	Likely D	Safe D	Likely D	Lean D	Safe D	Lean D	Safe D	Dennis Cardoza (D)
California 20	D+5	Jim Costa (D)	74.33% D	Tossup	Lean D	Lean D	Lean R (flip)	Lean D	Lean D	Tossup	Jim Costa (D)
California 44	R+6	Ken Calvert (R)	51.19% R	Safe R	Safe R	Likely R	Safe R	Safe R	Safe R	Safe R	Ken Calvert (R)
California 45	R+3	Mary Bono (R)	58.29% R	Safe R	Safe R	Likely R	Likely R	Safe R	Safe R	Safe R	Mary Bono (R)
California 47	D+4	Loretta Sanchez (D)	69.49% D	Lean D	Lean D	Likely D	Lean D	Lean D	Lean D	Likely D	Loretta Sanchez (D)
Colorado 3	R+5	John Salazar (D)	61.61% D	Tossup	Tilt R (flip)	Lean R (flip)	Lean R (flip)	Tossup	Tossup	Lean R (flip)	Scott Tipton (R)
Colorado 4	R+6	Betsy Markey (D)	56.20% D	Lean R (flip)	Likely R (flip)	Lean R (flip)	Lean R (flip)	Likely R (flip)	Lean R (flip)	Likely R (flip)	Cory Gardner (R)
Colorado 7	D+4	Ed Perlmutter (D)	63.48% D	Lean D	Likely D	Likely D	Safe D	Likely D	Lean D	Likely D	Ed Perlmutter (D)
Connecticut 1	D+13	John Larson (D)	71.55% D	Safe D	Safe D	Safe D	Likely D	Safe D	Safe D	Safe D	John Larson (D)
Connecticut 2	D+6	Joe Courtney (D)	65.67% D	Safe D	Safe D	Safe D	Likely D	Safe D	Safe D	Safe D	Joe Courtney (D)
Connecticut 4	D+4	Jim Himes (D)	51.32% D	Lean D	Likely D	Lean D	Tossup	Lean D	Lean D	Lean D	Jim Himes (D)
Connecticut 5	D+2	Chris Murphy (D)	59.86% D	Lean D	Likely D	Lean D	Tossup	Likely D	Lean D	Tossup	Chris Murphy (D)
Delaware at-large	D+7	Mike Castle (R) (retiring) (Note: Retired to run for senate)	61.08% R	Likely D (flip)	Lean D (flip)	Lean D (flip)	Lean D (flip)	Likely D (flip)	Lean D (flip)	Safe D (flip)	John Carney (D)
Florida 2	R+6	Allen Boyd (D)	62.23% D	Lean R (flip)	Likely R (flip)	Lean R (flip)	Lean R (flip)	Lean R (flip)	Lean R (flip)	Safe R (flip)	Steve Southerland (R)
Florida 8	R+2	Alan Grayson (D)	52.02% D	Likely R (flip)	Likely R (flip)	Lean R (flip)	Lean R (flip)	Lean R (flip)	Lean R (flip)	Likely R (flip)	Daniel Webster (R)
Florida 12	R+6	Adam Putnam (R) (retiring)	57.46% R	Lean R	Tilt R	Lean R	Lean R	Lean R	Safe R	Likely R	Dennis A. Ross (R)
Florida 22	D+1	Ron Klein (D)	54.67% D	Tossup	Tossup	Lean R (flip)	Lean R (flip)	Lean D	Tossup	Lean R (flip)	Allen West (R)
Florida 24	R+4	Suzanne Kosmas (D)	55.69% D	Lean R (flip)	Likely R (flip)	Lean R (flip)	Lean R (flip)	Likely R (flip)	Lean R (flip)	Likely R (flip)	Sandy Adams (R)
Florida 25	R+5	Mario Díaz-Balart (R) (retiring)	53.05% R	Lean R	Lean R	Likely R	Lean R	Lean R	Tossup	Likely R	David Rivera (R)
Georgia 2	D+1	Sanford Bishop (D)	68.94% D	Tossup	Lean D	Lean R (flip)	Lean R (flip)	Tossup	Tossup	Tossup	Sanford Bishop (D)
Georgia 8	R+10	Jim Marshall (D)	57.24% D	Lean R (flip)	Lean R (flip)	Lean R (flip)	Lean R (flip)	Tossup	Tossup	Likely R (flip)	Austin Scott (R)
Georgia 12	D+1	John Barrow (D)	66.00% D	Likely D	Safe D	Safe D	Likely D	Safe D	Lean D	Safe D	John Barrow (D)
Hawaii 1	D+11	Charles Djou (R)	39.68% R	Tossup	Tossup	Lean R	Tossup	Tossup	Tossup	Lean D (flip)	Colleen Hanabusa (D)
Idaho 1	R+18	Walt Minnick (D)	50.60% D	Tossup	Tilt D	Lean R (flip)	Tossup	Lean D	Tossup	Lean D	Raúl Labrador (R)
Illinois 8	R+1	Melissa Bean (D)	60.72% D	Likely D	Safe D	Likely D	Lean D	Safe D	Lean D	Likely D	Joe Walsh (R)
Illinois 10	D+6	Mark Kirk (R) (retiring)	52.56% R	Lean D (flip)	Tilt D (flip)	Lean D (flip)	Tossup	Lean D (flip)	Lean D (flip)	Lean D (flip)	Bob Dold (R)
Illinois 11	R+1	Debbie Halvorson (D)	58.40% D	Lean R (flip)	Likely R (flip)	Lean R (flip)	Likely R (flip)	Likely R (flip)	Lean R (flip)	Likely R (flip)	Adam Kinzinger (R)
Illinois 14	R+1	Bill Foster (D)	57.75% D	Tossup	Tilt R (flip)	Lean R (flip)	Lean R (flip)	Tossup	Tossup	Tossup	Randy Hultgren (R)
Illinois 17	D+3	Phil Hare (D)	99.77% D	Tossup	Tilt R (flip)	Lean R (flip)	Lean R (flip)	Tossup	Tossup	Lean R (flip)	Bobby Schilling (R)
Indiana 2	R+2	Joe Donnelly (D)	67.09% D	Tossup	Lean D	Lean D	Tossup	Lean D	Tossup	Lean D	Joe Donnelly (D)
Indiana 8	R+8	Brad Ellsworth (D) (retiring)	64.74% D	Likely R (flip)	Likely R (flip)	Likely R (flip)	Lean R (flip)	Likely R (flip)	Safe R (flip)	Likely R (flip)	Larry Bucshon (R)
Indiana 9	R+6	Baron Hill (D)	57.77% D	Tossup	Tilt R (flip)	Lean R (flip)	Lean R (flip)	Tossup	Tossup	Lean R (flip)	Todd Young (R)
Iowa 1	D+5	Bruce Braley (D)	64.61% D	Lean D	Likely D	Likely D	Lean D	Likely D	Lean D	Safe D	Bruce Braley (D)
Iowa 2	D+7	Dave Loebsack (D)	57.24% D	Lean D	Likely D	Likely D	Lean D	Lean D	Lean D	Likely D	Dave Loebsack (D)
Iowa 3	D+1	Leonard Boswell (D)	56.40% D	Lean D	Likely D	Lean D	Lean D	Lean D	Lean D	Likely D	Leonard Boswell (D)
Kansas 3	R+3	Dennis Moore (D) (retiring)	56.44% D	Likely R (flip)	Likely R (flip)	Likely R (flip)	Likely R (flip)	Likely R (flip)	Safe R (flip)	Safe R (flip)	Kevin Yoder (R)
Kentucky 3	D+2	John Yarmuth (D)	59.37% D	Likely D	Likely D	Likely D	Lean D	Likely D	Lean D	Safe D	John Yarmuth (D)
Kentucky 6	R+9	Ben Chandler (D)	64.66% D	Tossup	Lean D	Lean D	Tossup	Lean D	Tossup	Tossup	Ben Chandler (D)
Louisiana 2	D+25	Joseph Cao (R)	49.54% R	Likely D (flip)	Likely D (flip)	Lean D (flip)	Lean D (flip)	Likely D (flip)	Lean D (flip)	Likely D (flip)	Cedric Richmond (D)
Louisiana 3	R+12	Charlie Melançon (D) (retiring)	100.0% D	Likely R (flip)	Likely R (flip)	Likely R (flip)	Likely R (flip)	Safe R (flip)	Safe R (flip)	Likely R (flip)	Jeff Landry (R)
Maine 1	D+8	Chellie Pingree (D)	54.90% D	Tossup	Likely D	Lean D	Tossup	Likely D	Lean D	Likely D	Chellie Pingree (D)
Maine 2	D+3	Mike Michaud (D)	67.44% D	Lean D	Likely D	Safe D	Tossup	Safe D	Lean D	Likely D	Mike Michaud (D)
Maryland 1	R+13	Frank Kratovil (D)	49.12% D	Lean R (flip)	Lean R (flip)	Lean R (flip)	Lean R (flip)	Lean R (flip)	Lean R (flip)	Likely R (flip)	Andrew P. Harris (R)
Massachusetts 4	D+14	Barney Frank (D)	67.95% D	Lean D	Safe D	Likely D	Lean D	Likely D	Lean D	Safe D	Barney Frank (D)
Massachusetts 5	D+8	Niki Tsongas (D)	98.71% D	Likely D	Likely D	Safe D	Likely D	Likely D	Safe D	Safe D	Niki Tsongas (D)
Massachusetts 6	D+7	John F. Tierney (D)	70.40% D	Likely D	Safe D	Safe D	Likely D	Safe D	Safe D	Safe D	John F. Tierney (D)
Massachusetts 10	D+5	Bill Delahunt (D) (retiring)	98.64% D	Lean D	Tossup	Lean D	Tossup	Tossup	Tossup	Tossup	William R. Keating (D)
Michigan 1	R+3	Bart Stupak (D) (retiring)	65.04% D	Lean R (flip)	Tilt R (flip)	Lean R (flip)	Lean R (flip)	Lean R (flip)	Lean R (flip)	Likely R (flip)	Dan Benishek (R)
Michigan 7	R+2	Mark Schauer (D)	48.78% D	Tossup	Tossup	Lean R (flip)	Tossup	Tossup	Tossup	Tossup	Tim Walberg (R)
Michigan 9	D+2	Gary Peters (D)	52.08% D	Lean D	Lean D	Lean D	Tossup	Likely D	Lean D	Likely D	Gary Peters (D)
Michigan 15	D+13	John D. Dingell Jr. (D)	70.70% D	Safe D	Safe D	Safe D	Lean D	Safe D	Lean D	Safe D	John D. Dingell Jr. (D)
Minnesota 1	R+1	Tim Walz (D)	62.50% D	Lean D	Likely D	Lean D	Lean D	Lean D	Lean D	Likely D	Tim Walz (D)
Minnesota 6	R+7	Michele Bachmann (R)	46.41% R	Likely R	Safe R	Likely R	Likely R	Safe R	Lean R	Safe R	Michele Bachmann (R)
Minnesota 7	R+5	Collin Peterson (D)	72.20% D	Safe D	Safe D	Safe D	Likely D	Safe D	Safe D	Safe D	Collin Peterson (D)
Minnesota 8	D+3	Jim Oberstar (D)	67.69% D	Tossup	Likely D	Lean D	Tossup	Likely D	Safe D	Lean D	Chip Cravaack (R)
Mississippi 1	R+14	Travis Childers (D)	54.46% D	Tossup	Tilt R (flip)	Lean R (flip)	Lean R (flip)	Tossup	Lean R (flip)	Likely R (flip)	Alan Nunnelee (R)
Mississippi 2	D+12	Bennie Thompson (D)	69.05% D	Safe D	Safe D	Safe D	Likely D	Safe D	Safe D	Safe D	Bennie Thompson (D)
Mississippi 4	R+20	Gene Taylor (D)	74.54% D	Tossup	Tossup	Lean D	Tossup	Tossup	Tossup	Tossup	Steven Palazzo (R)
Missouri 3	D+7	Russ Carnahan (D)	66.36% D	Lean D	Likely D	Likely D	Lean D	Likely D	Safe D	Safe D	Russ Carnahan (D)
Missouri 4	R+14	Ike Skelton (D)	65.91% D	Tossup	Tossup	Lean D	Tossup	Tossup	Lean D	Tossup	Vicky Hartzler (R)
Missouri 5	D+10	Emanuel Cleaver (D)	64.37% D	Safe D	Safe D	Safe D	Likely D	Safe D	Safe D	Safe D	Emanuel Cleaver (D)
Nebraska 2	R+6	Lee Terry (R)	51.93% R	Likely R	Safe R	Likely R	Likely R	Safe R	Lean R	Safe R	Lee Terry (R)
Nevada 3	D+2	Dina Titus (D)	47.43% D	Lean R (flip)	Tilt R (flip)	Lean R (flip)	Lean R (flip)	Lean R (flip)	Tossup	Likely R (flip)	Joe Heck (R)
New Hampshire 1	Even	Carol Shea-Porter (D)	51.73% D	Lean R (flip)	Likely R (flip)	Lean R (flip)	Lean R (flip)	Lean R (flip)	Lean R (flip)	Likely R (flip)	Frank Guinta (R)
New Hampshire 2	D+3	Paul Hodes (D) (retiring)	56.44% D	Tossup	Tossup	Lean R (flip)	Tossup	Tossup	Tossup	Tossup	Charles Bass (R)
New Jersey 3	R+1	John Adler (D)	52.08% D	Tossup	Tilt R (flip)	Lean R (flip)	Lean R (flip)	Lean D	Tossup	Lean R (flip)	Jon Runyan (R)
New Jersey 6	D+8	Frank Pallone (D)	66.95% D	Likely D	Safe D	Safe D	Likely D	Safe D	Safe D	Safe D	Frank Pallone (D)
New Jersey 12	D+5	Rush Holt Jr. (D)	63.12% D	Likely D	Safe D	Likely D	Lean D	Safe D	Safe D	Safe D	Rush Holt Jr. (D)
New Mexico 1	D+5	Martin Heinrich (D)	55.65% D	Tossup	Tossup	Lean D	Tossup	Lean D	Lean D	Lean D	Martin Heinrich (D)
New Mexico 2	R+6	Harry Teague (D)	55.80% D	Lean R (flip)	Lean R (flip)	Lean R (flip)	Lean R (flip)	Tossup	Lean R (flip)	Likely R (flip)	Steve Pearce (R)
New Mexico 3	D+7	Ben Ray Lujan (D)	56.56% D	Likely D	Safe D	Safe D	Lean D	Safe D	Safe D	Safe D	Ben Ray Lujan (D)
New York 1	Even	Tim Bishop (D)	58.38% D	Tossup	Tilt D	Likely D	Tossup	Tossup	Lean D	Lean D	Tim Bishop (D)
New York 2	D+4	Steve Israel (D)	66.94% D	Safe D	Safe D	Safe D	Likely D	Safe D	Safe D	Safe D	Steve Israel (D)
New York 4	D+6	Carolyn McCarthy (D)	64.01% D	Likely D	Safe D	Safe D	Likely D	Likely D	Safe D	Safe D	Carolyn McCarthy (D)
New York 13	R+4	Michael McMahon (D)	60.95% D	Lean D	Likely D	Likely D	Tossup	Lean D	Lean D	Likely D	Michael Grimm (R)
New York 19	R+3	John Hall (D)	58.67% D	Tossup	Tilt R (flip)	Lean R (flip)	Tossup	Tossup	Tossup	Lean R (flip)	Nan Hayworth (R)
New York 20	R+2	Scott Murphy (D)	50.23% D	Tossup	Tilt R (flip)	Lean R (flip)	Lean R (flip)	Tossup	Tossup	Likely R (flip)	Chris Gibson (R)
New York 22	D+6	Maurice Hinchey (D)	64.44% D	Lean D	Safe D	Likely D	Lean D	Likely D	Lean D	Likely D	Maurice Hinchey (D)
New York 23	R+1	Bill Owens (D)	48.34% D	Tossup	Tossup	Lean R (flip)	Lean R (flip)	Tossup	Tossup	Tossup	Bill Owens (D)
New York 24	R+2	Mike Arcuri (D)	51.91% D	Tossup	Tossup	Lean D	Tossup	Tossup	Tossup	Lean D	Richard Hanna (R)
New York 25	D+3	Dan Maffei (D)	54.82% D	Lean D	Likely D	Likely D	Lean D	Likely D	Lean D	Likely D	Ann Marie Buerkle (R)
New York 27	D+4	Brian Higgins (D)	74.42% D	Safe D	Safe D	Safe D	Likely D	Safe D	Safe D	Safe D	Brian Higgins (D)
New York 29	R+5	Vacant	50.97% D	Likely R (flip)	Likely R (flip)	Likely R (flip)	Likely R (flip)	Safe R (flip)	Safe R (flip)	Safe R (flip)	Tom Reed (R)
North Carolina 2	R+2	Bob Etheridge (D)	66.93% D	Lean D	Tilt D	Likely D	Tossup	Likely D	Lean D	Tossup	Renee Ellmers (R)
North Carolina 4	D+8	David Price (D)	63.32% D	Safe D	Safe D	Safe D	Likely D	Safe D	Safe D	Safe D	David Price (D)
North Carolina 7	R+5	Mike McIntyre (D)	68.84% D	Tossup	Tilt D	Likely D	Tossup	Lean D	Lean D	Tossup	Mike McIntyre (D)
North Carolina 8	R+2	Larry Kissell (D)	55.38% D	Tossup	Lean D	Lean R (flip)	Tossup	Tossup	Tossup	Tossup	Larry Kissell (D)
North Carolina 11	R+6	Heath Shuler (D)	61.96% D	Lean D	Likely D	Likely D	Tossup	Likely D	Lean D	Likely D	Heath Shuler (D)
North Carolina 13	D+5	Brad Miller (D)	65.93% D	Safe D	Safe D	Safe D	Likely D	Safe D	Safe D	Safe D	Brad Miller (D)
North Dakota at-large	R+10	Earl Pomeroy (D)	61.97% D	Tossup	Tilt R (flip)	Lean R (flip)	Lean R (flip)	Tossup	Tossup	Likely R (flip)	Rick Berg (R)
Ohio 1	D+1	Steve Driehaus (D)	52.47% D	Lean R (flip)	Likely R (flip)	Lean R (flip)	Lean R (flip)	Likely R (flip)	Lean R (flip)	Likely R (flip)	Steve Chabot (R)
Ohio 6	R+2	Charlie Wilson (D)	63.88% D	Tossup	Tossup	Lean D	Tossup	Tossup	Tossup	Tossup	Bill Johnson (R)
Ohio 10	D+8	Dennis Kucinich (D)	57.02% D	Likely D	Safe D	Safe D	Likely D	Safe D	Safe D	Safe D	Dennis Kucinich (D)
Ohio 12	D+1	Pat Tiberi (R)	54.78% R	Likely R	Safe R	Likely R	Likely R	Safe R	Safe R	Safe R	Pat Tiberi (R)
Ohio 13	D+5	Betty Sutton (D)	64.55% D	Likely D	Likely D	Likely D	Lean D	Likely D	Lean D	Safe D	Betty Sutton (D)
Ohio 15	D+1	Mary Jo Kilroy (D)	45.76% D	Lean R (flip)	Likely R (flip)	Lean R (flip)	Likely R (flip)	Likely R (flip)	Lean R (flip)	Likely R (flip)	Steve Stivers (R)
Ohio 16	R+4	John Boccieri (D)	55.36% D	Tossup	Lean R (flip)	Lean R (flip)	Lean R (flip)	Tossup	Tossup	Lean R (flip)	Jim Renacci (R)
Ohio 18	R+7	Zack Space (D)	58.97% D	Tossup	Tilt R (flip)	Lean R (flip)	Lean R (flip)	Tossup	Tossup	Lean D	Bob Gibbs (R)
Oklahoma 2	R+14	Dan Boren (D)	70.47% D	Safe D	Safe D	Safe D	Likely D	Safe D	Safe D	Safe D	Dan Boren (D)
Oregon 1	D+8	David Wu (D)	71.50% D	Likely D	Safe D	Safe D	Likely D	Likely D	Safe D	Safe D	David Wu (D)
Oregon 4	D+2	Peter DeFazio (D)	82.34% D	Likely D	Safe D	Safe D	Lean D	Safe D	Safe D	Safe D	Peter DeFazio (D)
Oregon 5	D+1	Kurt Schrader (D)	54.25% D	Tossup	Tossup	Lean D	Tossup	Tossup	Tossup	Tossup	Kurt Schrader (D)
Pennsylvania 3	R+3	Kathy Dahlkemper (D)	51.24% D	Lean R (flip)	Likely R (flip)	Lean R (flip)	Lean R (flip)	Likely R (flip)	Lean R (flip)	Likely R (flip)	Mike Kelly (R)
Pennsylvania 4	R+6	Jason Altmire (D)	55.86% D	Lean D	Likely D	Likely D	Lean D	Likely D	Lean D	Likely D	Jason Altmire (D)
Pennsylvania 6	D+4	Jim Gerlach (R)	52.10% R	Likely R	Safe R	Likely R	Lean R	Safe R	Lean R	Safe R	Jim Gerlach (R)
Pennsylvania 7	D+3	Joe Sestak (D) (retiring)	59.59% D	Lean R (flip)	Tilt R (flip)	Lean R (flip)	Tossup	Tossup	Lean R (flip)	Lean R (flip)	Pat Meehan (R)
Pennsylvania 8	D+2	Patrick Murphy (D)	56.77% D	Tossup	Tilt R (flip)	Lean R (flip)	Tossup	Tossup	Tossup	Lean R (flip)	Mike Fitzpatrick (R)
Pennsylvania 10	R+8	Chris Carney (D)	56.33% D	Tossup	Tossup	Lean R (flip)	Lean R (flip)	Tossup	Tossup	Likely R (flip)	Tom Marino (R)
Pennsylvania 11	D+4	Paul Kanjorski (D)	51.63% D	Tossup	Tilt R (flip)	Lean R (flip)	Tossup	Lean R (flip)	Lean R (flip)	Tossup	Lou Barletta (R)
Pennsylvania 12	R+1	Mark Critz (D)	52.60% D	Lean D	Tossup	Lean D	Tossup	Lean D	Lean D	Lean D	Mark Critz (D)
Pennsylvania 13	D+7	Allyson Schwartz (D)	62.79% D	Safe D	Safe D	Safe D	Likely D	Safe D	Safe D	Safe D	Allyson Schwartz (D)
Pennsylvania 15	D+2	Charlie Dent (R)	58.57% R	Likely R	Likely R	Lean R	Likely R	Lean R	Lean R	Safe R	Charlie Dent (R)
Pennsylvania 17	R+6	Tim Holden (D)	63.68% D	Likely D	Safe D	Likely D	Likely D	Likely D	Lean D	Safe D	Tim Holden (D)
Rhode Island 1	D+13	Patrick J. Kennedy (D) (retiring)	68.52% D	Lean D	Lean D	Lean D	Tossup	Lean D	Safe D	Likely D	David Cicilline (D)
South Carolina 5	R+7	John Spratt (D)	61.64% D	Tossup	Lean R (flip)	Lean R (flip)	Lean R (flip)	Tossup	Tossup	Likely R (flip)	Mick Mulvaney (R)
South Dakota at-large	R+9	Stephanie Herseth Sandlin (D)	67.56% D	Tossup	Tilt R (flip)	Lean R (flip)	Lean R (flip)	Tossup	Tossup	Lean R (flip)	Kristi Noem (R)
Tennessee 4	R+13	Lincoln Davis (D)	58.76% D	Tossup	Tilt R (flip)	Lean R (flip)	Tossup	Tossup	Tossup	Lean R (flip)	Scott DesJarlais (R)
Tennessee 5	D+3	Jim Cooper (D)	65.84% D	Likely D	Safe D	Safe D	Likely D	Safe D	Safe D	Safe D	Jim Cooper (D)
Tennessee 6	R+13	Bart Gordon (D) (retiring)	74.42% D	Likely R (flip)	Likely R (flip)	Likely R (flip)	Likely R (flip)	Safe R (flip)	Safe R (flip)	Safe R (flip)	Diane Black (R)
Tennessee 8	R+6	John Tanner (D) (retiring)	99.97% D	Likely R (flip)	Likely R (flip)	Likely R (flip)	Likely R (flip)	Likely R (flip)	Safe R (flip)	Safe R (flip)	Stephen Fincher (R)
Texas 15	D+3	Rubén Hinojosa (D)	65.71% D	Safe D	Safe D	Safe D	Likely D	Safe D	Safe D	Safe D	Rubén Hinojosa (D)
Texas 17	R+20	Chet Edwards (D)	52.98% D	Lean R (flip)	Likely R (flip)	Lean R (flip)	Likely R (flip)	Likely R (flip)	Lean R (flip)	Safe R (flip)	Bill Flores (R)
Texas 23	R+4	Ciro Rodriguez (D)	55.76% D	Tossup	Tossup	Lean R (flip)	Lean R (flip)	Tossup	Tossup	Tossup	Quico Canseco (R)
Texas 25	D+6	Lloyd Doggett (D)	65.83% D	Safe D	Safe D	Safe D	Likely D	Safe D	Safe D	Safe D	Lloyd Doggett (D)
Texas 27	R+2	Solomon P. Ortiz (D)	57.95% D	Lean D	Likely D	Safe D	Tossup	Likely D	Lean D	Likely D	Blake Farenthold (R)
Utah 2	R+15	Jim Matheson (D)	63.35% D	Likely D	Safe D	Safe D	Likely D	Safe D	Safe D	Likely D	Jim Matheson (D)
Virginia 2	R+5	Glenn Nye (D)	52.40% D	Lean R (flip)	Lean R (flip)	Lean R (flip)	Lean R (flip)	Tossup	Lean R (flip)	Likely R (flip)	Scott Rigell (R)
Virginia 5	R+5	Tom Perriello (D)	50.09% D	Lean R (flip)	Tilt R (flip)	Lean R (flip)	Lean R (flip)	Tossup	Lean R (flip)	Likely R (flip)	Robert Hurt (R)
Virginia 9	R+11	Rick Boucher (D)	97.07% D	Tossup	Tilt D	Lean D	Lean D	Lean D	Lean D	Lean D	Morgan Griffith (R)
Virginia 11	D+2	Gerry Connolly (D)	54.69% D	Tossup	Lean D	Lean D	Tossup	Lean D	Tossup	Lean D	Gerry Connolly (D)
Washington 2	D+3	Rick Larsen (D)	62.39% D	Tossup	Lean D	Lean D	Tossup	Lean D	Lean D	Likely D	Rick Larsen (D)
Washington 3	Even	Brian Baird (D) (retiring)	64.01% D	Lean R (flip)	Tilt R (flip)	Lean R (flip)	Tossup	Lean R (flip)	Lean R (flip)	Likely R (flip)	Jaime Herrera Beutler (R)
Washington 6	D+5	Norm Dicks (D)	66.86% D	Safe D	Safe D	Safe D	Likely D	Safe D	Safe D	Safe D	Norm Dicks (D)
Washington 8	D+3	Dave Reichert (R)	52.78% R	Likely R	Likely R	Lean R	Lean R	Lean R	Lean R	Likely R	Dave Reichert (R)
Washington 9	D+5	Adam Smith (D)	65.45% D	Likely D	Safe D	Safe D	Tossup	Safe D	Safe D	Likely D	Adam Smith (D)
West Virginia 1	R+9	Alan Mollohan (D) (lost renomination)	99.93% D	Tossup	Tossup	Lean R (flip)	Tossup	Tossup	Tossup	Tossup	David McKinley (R)
West Virginia 3	R+6	Nick Rahall (D)	66.92% D	Likely D	Safe D	Likely D	Likely D	Likely D	Lean D	Likely D	Nick Rahall (D)
Wisconsin 3	D+4	Ron Kind (D)	63.19% D	Lean D	Likely D	Likely D	Tossup	Lean D	Lean D	Likely D	Ron Kind (D)
Wisconsin 7	D+3	Dave Obey (D) (retiring)	60.79% D	Tossup	Tilt R (flip)	Lean R (flip)	Lean R (flip)	Tossup	Tossup	Likely R (flip)	Sean Duffy (R)
Wisconsin 8	R+2	Steve Kagen (D)	54.00% D	Lean R (flip)	Lean R (flip)	Lean R (flip)	Lean R (flip)	Lean R (flip)	Lean R (flip)	Likely R (flip)	Reid Ribble (R)
Overall				R - 204; D - 181; 50 tossups	R - 223; D - 194; 18 tossups	R - 237; D - 198	R - 225; D - 168; 43 tossups	R - 199; D - 195; 41 tossups	D - 190; R - 174; 42 tossups	R - 216; D - 200; 19 tossups	R - 242; D - 193
