= 2012 United States House of Representatives election ratings =

Predictions for select races in the 2012 U.S. House elections

The 2012 United States House of Representatives elections were held November 6, 2012, to elect representatives from all 435 congressional districts across each of the 50 U.S. states. The six non-voting delegates from the District of Columbia and the inhabited U.S. territories will also be elected. Numerous federal, state, and local elections, including the 2012 presidential election and the 2012 Senate elections, were also held on this date.

== Election ratings ==
Several sites and individuals publish ratings of competitive seats. The seats listed below were considered competitive (not "safe" or "solid") by at least one of the rating groups. These ratings are based upon factors such as the strength of the incumbent (if the incumbent is running for re-election), the strength of the candidates, and the partisan history of the district (the Cook Partisan Voting Index is one example of this metric). Each rating describes the likelihood of a given outcome in the election.

Most election ratings use:

- Tossup: no advantage
- Tilt (sometimes used): slight advantage
- Lean: clear advantage
- Likely: strong, but not certain advantage
- Safe: outcome is nearly certain

District	CPVI	Incumbent	Previous result	Cook November 5, 2012	Rothenberg November 2, 2012	Sabato November 5, 2012	RCP November 4, 2012	Roll Call November 4, 2012	NYT November 4, 2012	The Hill November 4, 2012	Winner
Arizona 1	R+3	Paul Gosar (R) (switching seats) (Note: Contested the new 4th and won.)	49.7% R	Tossup	Tossup	Lean R	Tossup	Tossup	Tossup	Tossup	Ann Kirkpatrick (D)
Arizona 2	R+2	Ron Barber (D)	52.3% D	Lean D	Tilt D	Likely D	Lean D	Tossup	Tossup	Lean D	Ron Barber (D)
Arizona 9	R+1	David Schweikert (R) (switching seats) (Note: Contested the 6th and won.)	52.0% R	Lean D (flip)	Tilt D (flip)	Lean D (flip)	Lean D (flip)	Tossup	Lean D (flip)	Tossup	Kyrsten Sinema (D)
Arkansas 1	R+7	Rick Crawford (R)	51.8% R	Safe R	Safe R	Safe R	Safe R	Safe R	Safe R	Likely R	Rick Crawford (R)
Arkansas 4	R+9	Mike Ross (D) (retiring)	57.5% D	Likely R (flip)	Safe R (flip)	Safe R (flip)	Safe R (flip)	Safe R (flip)	Safe R (flip)	Likely R (flip)	Tom Cotton (R)
California 3	D+1	John Garamendi (D)	58.8% D	Likely D	Safe D	Safe D	Likely D	Likely D	Lean D	Lean D	John Garamendi (D)
California 7	R+3	Dan Lungren (R)	50.1% R	Tossup	Tilt D (flip)	Lean D (flip)	Tossup	Tossup	Lean D (flip)	Lean D (flip)	Ami Bera (D)
California 9	D+2	Jerry McNerney (D)	48.0% D	Tossup	Tilt D	Lean D	Tossup	Lean D	Lean D	Lean D	Jerry McNerney (D)
California 10	R+5	Jeff Denham (R)	64.6% R	Tossup	Tilt R	Lean R	Tossup	Tossup	Lean R	Tossup	Jeff Denham (R)
California 16	D+2	Jim Costa (D)	51.7% D	Safe D	Safe D	Safe D	Safe D	Safe D	Lean D	Likely D	Jim Costa (D)
California 21	R+3	(New seat)		Likely R	Safe R	Likely R	Likely R	Safe R	Lean R	Lean R	David Valadao (R)
California 24	D+3	Lois Capps (D)	57.8% D	Lean D	Tilt D	Lean D	Tossup	Tossup	Lean D	Tossup	Lois Capps (D)
California 26	D+2	Elton Gallegly (R) (retiring)	59.9% R	Tossup	Tossup	Lean D (flip)	Tossup	Tossup	Lean D (flip)	Tossup	Julia Brownley (D)
California 36	R+3	Mary Bono (R)	51.4% R	Tossup	Tilt R	Lean R	Tossup	Tossup	Lean R	Tossup	Raul Ruiz (D)
California 41	D+3	(New seat)		Lean D (flip)	Lean D (flip)	Lean D (flip)	Lean D (flip)	Lean D (flip)	Tossup	Lean D (flip)	Mark Takano (D)
California 47	D+5	(New seat)		Likely D	Likely D	Likely D	Likely D	Safe D	Lean D	Likely D	Alan Lowenthal (D)
California 52	R+1	Brian Bilbray (R)	56.6% R	Tossup	Tossup	Lean D (flip)	Tossup	Tossup	Tossup	Tossup	Scott Peters (D)
Colorado 3	R+4	Scott Tipton (R)	50.1% R	Lean R	Likely R	Likely R	Lean R	Tossup	Lean R	Lean R	Scott Tipton (R)
Colorado 6	R+1	Mike Coffman (R)	65.7% R	Tossup	Tilt R	Lean R	Tossup	Tossup	Lean R	Tossup	Mike Coffman (R)
Colorado 7	D+3	Ed Perlmutter (D)	53.4% D	Lean D	Lean D	Likely D	Lean D	Likely D	Safe D	Safe D	Ed Perlmutter (D)
Connecticut 4	D+5	Jim Himes (D)	53.1% D	Safe D	Safe D	Safe D	Likely D	Safe D	Safe D	Safe D	Jim Himes (D)
Connecticut 5	D+2	Chris Murphy (D) (retiring) (Note: Retired to run for senate)	54.1% D	Tossup	Tossup	Lean D	Tossup	Lean D	Tossup	Lean D	Elizabeth Esty (D)
Florida 2	R+3	Steve Southerland (R)	53.6% R	Lean R	Likely R	Lean R	Lean R	Lean R	Lean R	Likely R	Steve Southerland (R)
Florida 9	D+4	(New seat)		Likely D (flip)	Safe D (flip)	Safe D (flip)	Likely D (flip)	Safe D (flip)	Lean D (flip)	Likely D (flip)	Alan Grayson (D)
Florida 10	R+3	Daniel Webster (R)	56.1% R	Lean R	Lean R	Lean R	Lean R	Lean R	Lean R	Tossup	Daniel Webster (R)
Florida 13	R+1	Bill Young (R)	65.9% R	Safe R	Safe R	Safe R	Likely R	Safe R	Safe R	Lean R	Bill Young (R)
Florida 16	R+5	Vern Buchanan (R)	68.9% R	Likely R	Likely R	Likely R	Likely R	Likely R	Lean R	Likely R	Vern Buchanan (R)
Florida 18	R+1	Tom Rooney (R) (switching seats) (Note: Contested the new 17th and won. Allen West (R) ran in this seat and lost.)	66.9% R	Tossup	Tilt R	Lean R	Tossup	Lean R	Tossup	Tossup	Patrick Murphy (D)
Florida 24	D+5	Allen West (R) (switching seats) (Note: Contested the 18th and lost.)	54.4% R	Likely D (flip)	Likely D (flip)	Lean D (flip)	Lean D (flip)	Likely D (flip)	Lean D (flip)	Tossup	Lois Frankel (D)
Florida 26	R+3	David Rivera (R)	52.2% R	Lean D (flip)	Lean D (flip)	Lean D (flip)	Lean D (flip)	Lean D (flip)	Tossup	Likely D (flip)	Joe Garcia (D)
Georgia 12	R+9	John Barrow (D)	56.6% D	Tossup	Tilt D	Lean D	Tossup	Tossup	Tossup	Tossup	John Barrow (D)
Illinois 8	D+6	Peter Roskam (R) (switching seats) (Note: Contested the new 6th and won. Joe Walsh (R) ran in this seat and lost.)	63.7% R	Lean D (flip)	Lean D (flip)	Lean D (flip)	Lean D (flip)	Lean D (flip)	Tossup	Likely D (flip)	Tammy Duckworth (D)
Illinois 10	D+8	Bob Dold (R)	51.1% R	Tossup	Tossup	Lean R	Tossup	Tossup	Lean D (flip)	Tossup	Brad Schneider (D)
Illinois 11	D+6	Judy Biggert (R)	63.8% R	Tossup	Tossup	Lean D (flip)	Lean D (flip)	Tossup	Lean D (flip)	Lean D (flip)	Bill Foster (D)
Illinois 12	D+2	Jerry Costello (D)	59.8% D	Tossup	Tossup	Lean D	Tossup	Tossup	Tossup	Tossup	William Enyart (D)
Illinois 13	D+1	(New seat) (Note: Tim Johnson (R) ran in this seat but retired after the primaries.)		Tossup	Tossup	Lean D (flip)	Tossup	Tossup	Lean R	Tossup	Rodney Davis (R)
Illinois 17	D+6	Bobby Schilling (R)	52.6% R	Tossup	Tossup	Lean D (flip)	Tossup	Tossup	Lean D (flip)	Lean D (flip)	Cheri Bustos (D)
Indiana 2	R+7	Joe Donnelly (D) (retiring)	48.2% D	Likely R (flip)	Safe R (flip)	Likely R (flip)	Likely R (flip)	Likely R (flip)	Safe D	Lean R (flip)	Jackie Walorski (R)
Indiana 8	R+8	Larry Bucshon (R)	57.6% R	Lean R	Likely R	Lean R	Likely R	Safe R	Lean R	Lean R	Larry Bucshon (R)
Iowa 1	D+5	Bruce Braley (D)	49.5% D	Likely D	Safe D	Likely D	Likely D	Safe D	Safe D	Likely D	Bruce Braley (D)
Iowa 2	D+4	Dave Loebsack (D)	55.4% D	Likely D	Likely D	Likely D	Likely D	Likely D	Safe D	Lean D	Dave Loebsack (D)
Iowa 3	R+1	Leonard Boswell (D) (Note: Fellow incumbent Tom Latham (R) moved from the 4th to run in this seat.)	48.2% D	Lean R (flip)	Tilt R (flip)	Lean R (flip)	Tossup	Tossup	Tossup	Tossup	Tom Latham (R)
Iowa 4	R+4	Tom Latham (R) (switching seats) (Note: Latham moved to the 3rd to run there. Steve King moved from the old 5th to run in this seat.)	65.8% R	Lean R	Tilt R	Lean R	Tossup	Lean R	Lean R	Lean R	Steve King (R)
Kentucky 6	R+7	Ben Chandler (D)	50.1% D	Tossup	Tossup	Lean R (flip)	Tossup	Tossup	Lean D	Tossup	Andy Barr (R)
Maine 2	D+3	Mike Michaud (D)	55.1% D	Safe D	Safe D	Safe D	Lean D	Safe D	Safe D	Likely D	Mike Michaud (D)
Maryland 6	D+2	Roscoe Bartlett (R)	61.5% R	Likely D (flip)	Likely D (flip)	Likely D (flip)	Likely D (flip)	Likely D (flip)	Lean D (flip)	Lean D (flip)	John Delaney (D)
Massachusetts 6	D+7	John F. Tierney (D)	56.9% D	Lean R (flip)	Lean R (flip)	Lean R (flip)	Lean R (flip)	Lean R (flip)	Tossup	Lean R (flip)	John F. Tierney (D)
Michigan 1	R+4	Dan Benishek (R)	51.9% R	Tossup	Tossup	Lean D (flip)	Tossup	Tossup	Tossup	Tossup	Dan Benishek (R)
Michigan 3	R+5	Justin Amash (R)	59.7% R	Likely R	Safe R	Lean R	Likely R	Safe R	Lean R	Safe R	Justin Amash (R)
Michigan 6	R+1	Fred Upton (R)	62.0% R	Safe R	Safe R	Safe R	Safe R	Safe R	Safe R	Likely R	Fred Upton (R)
Michigan 7	R+3	Tim Walberg (R)	50.2% R	Safe R	Safe R	Safe R	Safe R	Safe R	Lean R	Safe R	Tim Walberg (R)
Michigan 11	R+4	(Vacant) (Note: Thad McCotter resigned in July 2012, David Curson (D) won a simultaneous special election to fill the remainder of McCotter's term.)	59.3% R	Lean R	Lean R	Lean R	Tossup	Likely R	Lean R	Likely R	Kerry Bentivolio (R)
Minnesota 2	R+2	John Kline (R)	63.3% R	Safe R	Safe R	Likely R	Safe R	Likely R	Lean R	Likely R	John Kline (R)
Minnesota 6	R+8	Michele Bachmann (R)	52.5% R	Lean R	Lean R	Likely R	Lean R	Lean R	Safe R	Lean R	Michele Bachmann (R)
Minnesota 7	R+5	Collin Peterson (D)	60.4% D	Safe D	Safe D	Safe D	Safe D	Safe D	Safe D	Likely D	Collin Peterson (D)
Minnesota 8	D+3	Chip Cravaack (R)	48.2% R	Tossup	Tossup	Lean D (flip)	Tossup	Tossup	Tossup	Tossup	Rick Nolan (D)
Montana at-large	R+7	Denny Rehberg (R) (retiring)	60.3% R	Likely R	Safe R	Likely R	Likely R	Likely R	Safe R	Likely R	Steve Daines (R)
Nebraska 2	R+6	Lee Terry (R)	60.8% R	Likely R	Safe R	Safe R	Lean R	Safe R	Safe R	Likely R	Lee Terry (R)
Nevada 3	Even	Joe Heck (R)	48.1% R	Lean R	Lean R	Lean R	Lean R	Lean R	Lean R	Tossup	Joe Heck (R)
Nevada 4	D+2	(New seat)		Tossup	Tossup	Lean D (flip)	Tossup	Tossup	Lean D (flip)	Tossup	Steven Horsford (D)
New Hampshire 1	Even	Frank Guinta (R)	54.0% R	Tossup	Tossup	Lean R	Tossup	Tossup	Lean R	Tossup	Carol Shea-Porter (D)
New Hampshire 2	D+3	Charles Bass (R)	48.3% R	Lean D (flip)	Tossup	Lean D (flip)	Lean D (flip)	Tossup	Tossup	Lean D (flip)	Annie Kuster (D)
New Jersey 3	R+3	Jon Runyan (R)	50.0% R	Lean R	Likely R	Likely R	Lean R	Safe R	Likely R	Likely R	Jon Runyan (R)
New Jersey 5	R+4	Scott Garrett (R)	65.0% R	Safe R	Safe R	Safe R	Safe R	Safe R	Safe R	Likely R	Scott Garrett (R)
New Jersey 7	R+6	Leonard Lance (R)	65.0% R	Safe R	Safe R	Safe R	Likely R	Safe R	Safe R	Safe R	Leonard Lance (R)
New Jersey 9	D+11	Bill Pascrell (D)	62.7% D	Safe D	Safe D	Safe D	Safe D	Safe D	Safe D	Likely D	Bill Pascrell (D)
New Mexico 1	D+5	Martin Heinrich (D) (retiring)	51.8% D	Safe D	Safe D	Safe D	Safe D	Safe D	Lean D	Likely D	Martin Heinrich (D)
New York 1	Even	Tim Bishop (D)	50.2% D	Lean D	Tilt D	Lean D	Tossup	Lean D	Tossup	Tossup	Tim Bishop (D)
New York 11	R+6	Michael Grimm (R)	51.3% R	Likely R	Lean R	Likely R	Likely R	Likely R	Tossup	Likely R	Michael Grimm (R)
New York 18	R+2	Nan Hayworth (R)	52.7% R	Tossup	Tilt R	Lean R	Lean R	Tossup	Lean R	Tossup	Sean Patrick Maloney (D)
New York 19	Even	Chris Gibson (R)	54.9% R	Tossup	Tilt R	Lean R	Lean R	Tossup	Lean R	Tossup	Chris Gibson (R)
New York 21	R+2	Bill Owens (D)	47.5% D	Lean D	Tilt D	Lean D	Tossup	Tossup	Lean D	Lean D	Bill Owens (D)
New York 22	R+3	Richard Hanna (R)	53.1% R	Safe R	Safe R	Safe R	Safe R	Safe R	Lean R	Likely R	Richard Hanna (R)
New York 23	R+3	Tom Reed (R)	52.1% R	Safe R	Safe R	Safe R	Safe R	Safe R	Lean R	Safe R	Tom Reed (R)
New York 24	D+3	Ann Marie Buerkle (R)	50.2% R	Lean D (flip)	Tilt D (flip)	Lean D (flip)	Lean D (flip)	Tossup	Tossup	Tossup	Dan Maffei (D)
New York 25	D+5	Louise Slaughter (D)	64.9% D	Likely D	Likely D	Lean D	Lean D	Likely D	Lean D	Likely D	Louise Slaughter (D)
New York 27	R+7	Kathy Hochul (D)	47.2% D	Lean R (flip)	Tilt R (flip)	Lean R (flip)	Tossup	Tossup	Tossup	Tossup	Chris Collins (R)
North Carolina 7	R+11	Mike McIntyre (D)	53.7% D	Tossup	Tossup	Lean R (flip)	Tossup	Tossup	Lean D	Tossup	Mike McIntyre (D)
North Carolina 8	R+12	Larry Kissell (D)	53.0% D	Likely R (flip)	Likely R (flip)	Likely R (flip)	Likely R (flip)	Likely R (flip)	Tossup	Likely R (flip)	Richard Hudson (R)
North Carolina 11	R+12	Heath Shuler (D) (retiring)	54.3% D	Likely R (flip)	Likely R (flip)	Likely R (flip)	Likely R (flip)	Safe R (flip)	Lean R (flip)	Likely R (flip)	Mark Meadows (R)
North Carolina 13	R+9	Brad Miller (D) (retiring)	55.5% D	Likely R (flip)	Likely R (flip)	Likely R (flip)	Likely R (flip)	Safe R (flip)	Lean R (flip)	Likely R (flip)	George Holding (R)
North Dakota at-large	R+10	Rick Berg (R) (retiring)	54.7% R	Likely R	Safe R	Likely R	Likely R	Likely R	Safe R	Likely R	Kevin Cramer (R)
Ohio 6	R+5	Bill Johnson (R)	50.2% R	Tossup	Lean R	Lean R	Tossup	Lean R	Tossup	Lean R	Bill Johnson (R)
Ohio 7	R+5	Bob Gibbs (R)	53.9% R	Likely R	Safe R	Safe R	Likely R	Safe R	Lean R	Likely R	Bob Gibbs (R)
Ohio 9	D+15	Marcy Kaptur (D)	59.4% D	Safe D	Safe D	Safe D	Safe D	Safe D	Safe D	Likely D	Marcy Kaptur (D)
Ohio 16	R+5	Jim Renacci (R) (Note: Fellow incumbent Betty Sutton (D) moved from the 18th to run in this seat.)	52.1% R	Lean R	Tilt R	Lean D (flip)	Tossup	Lean R	Tossup	Tossup	Jim Renacci (R)
Oklahoma 2	R+14	Dan Boren (D) (retiring)	56.5% D	Likely R (flip)	Safe R (flip)	Lean R (flip)	Likely R (flip)	Likely R (flip)	Safe R (flip)	Lean R (flip)	Markwayne Mullin (R)
Oregon 5	Even	Kurt Schrader (D)	51.3% D	Safe D	Safe D	Safe D	Safe D	Safe D	Lean D	Likely D	Kurt Schrader (D)
Pennsylvania 6	R+1	Jim Gerlach (R)	53.1% R	Likely R	Safe R	Likely R	Likely R	Safe R	Lean R	Likely R	Jim Gerlach (R)
Pennsylvania 7	Even	Pat Meehan (R)	54.9% R	Safe R	Safe R	Safe R	Safe R	Safe R	Lean R	Likely R	Pat Meehan (R)
Pennsylvania 8	D+1	Mike Fitzpatrick (R)	53.5% R	Lean R	Likely R	Likely R	Likely R	Safe R	Lean R	Lean R	Mike Fitzpatrick (R)
Pennsylvania 11	R+6	Lou Barletta (R)	54.7% R	Safe R	Safe R	Safe R	Safe R	Safe R	Safe R	Likely R	Lou Barletta (R)
Pennsylvania 12	R+6	Jason Altmire (D) (lost renomination) (Note: Fellow incumbent Mark Critz (D) moved from the 12th to run in this seat, but lost.)	50.8% D	Tossup	Tossup	Lean D	Tossup	Tossup	Tossup	Tossup	Keith Rothfus (R)
Pennsylvania 15	R+2	Charlie Dent (R)	53.5% R	Safe R	Safe R	Safe R	Safe R	Safe R	Safe R	Likely R	Charlie Dent (R)
Pennsylvania 18	R+6	Tim Murphy (R)	67.3% R	Safe R	Safe R	Safe R	Safe R	Safe R	Safe R	Likely R	Tim Murphy (R)
Rhode Island 1	D+14	David Cicilline (D)	50.6% D	Tossup	Tilt D	Lean D	Lean D	Tossup	Lean D	Tossup	David Cicilline (D)
South Dakota at-large	R+9	Kristi Noem (R)	48.1% R	Likely R	Safe R	Likely R	Safe R	Safe R	Safe R	Safe R	Kristi Noem (R)
Tennessee 4	R+13	Scott DesJarlais (R)	57.1% R	Tossup	Tilt R	Lean R	Lean R	Lean R	Safe R	Lean R	Scott DesJarlais (R)
Texas 10	R+11	Michael McCaul (R)	64.7% R	Safe R	Safe R	Safe R	Safe R	Safe R	Safe R	Likely R	Michael McCaul (R)
Texas 14	R+8	Ron Paul (R) (retiring)	76.0% R	Lean R	Lean R	Likely R	Lean R	Lean R	Safe R	Lean R	Randy Weber (R)
Texas 23	R+5	Quico Canseco (R)	49.4% R	Tossup	Tilt R	Lean D (flip)	Tossup	Tossup	Lean R	Tossup	Pete Gallego (D)
Texas 34	D+3	(New seat)		Safe D (flip)	Safe D (flip)	Safe D (flip)	Safe D (flip)	Safe D (flip)	Safe D (flip)	Likely D (flip)	Filemon Vela Jr. (D)
Utah 4	R+14	(New seat) (Note: Jim Matheson (D) moved from the 2nd district to run in this new seat.)		Lean R (flip)	Tilt R (flip)	Lean R (flip)	Tossup	Lean R (flip)	Tossup	Tossup	Jim Matheson (D)
Virginia 2	R+5	Scott Rigell (R)	53.1% R	Likely R	Likely R	Likely R	Likely R	Likely R	Lean R	Lean R	Scott Rigell (R)
Virginia 5	R+5	Robert Hurt (R)	50.8% R	Safe R	Safe R	Likely R	Safe R	Safe R	Safe R	Safe R	Robert Hurt (R)
Washington 1	D+3	(Vacant) (Note: Jay Inslee resigned in March 2012, Suzan DelBene (D) won a simultaneous special election to fill the remainder of Inslee's term.)	57.7% D	Likely D	Lean D	Likely D	Lean D	Likely D	Lean D	Lean D	Suzan DelBene (D)
Washington 3	R+2	Jaime Herrera Beutler (R)	53.0% R	Safe R	Safe R	Safe R	Safe R	Safe R	Safe R	Likely R	Jaime Herrera Beutler (R)
Washington 10	D+4	(New seat)		Safe D (flip)	Safe D (flip)	Safe D (flip)	Safe D (flip)	Safe D (flip)	Lean D (flip)	Likely D (flip)	Denny Heck (D)
West Virginia 3	R+6	Nick Rahall (D)	56.0% D	Likely D	Safe D	Likely D	Likely D	Likely D	Lean D	Likely D	Nick Rahall (D)
Wisconsin 7	Even	Sean Duffy (R)	52.1% R	Lean R	Lean R	Lean R	Lean R	Likely R	Lean R	Tossup	Sean Duffy (R)
Wisconsin 8	R+2	Reid Ribble (R)	55.9% R	Likely R	Safe R	Likely R	Likely R	Safe R	Lean R	Likely R	Reid Ribble (R)
Overall				R - 217; D - 174; 44 tossups	R - 233; D - 185; 18 tossups	R - 239; D - 196	R - 224; D - 178; 33 tossups	R - 227; D -175; 33 tossups	R - 227; D - 183; 25 tossups	Republican retain 35 tossups	R - 234; D - 201
