= 2006 United States House of Representatives elections in Iowa =

- November 7, 2006

All 5 Iowa seats to the United States House of Representatives
	Majority party	Minority party
Party	Democratic	Republican
Last election	1	4
Seats won	3	2
Seat change	▲2	▼2
Popular vote	492,937	522,388
Percentage	47.72%	50.57%

Democratic
40–50%
50–60%
Republican
40–50%
50–60%
60–70%
70–80%
80–90%

In Iowa, midterm elections for the state's five congressional seats took place November 7, 2006. Each race was contested, pitting the winners of the Republican and Democratic primaries conducted June 6.

The Democratic Party won three of the five seats up for grabs. In the 2nd district, 30-year incumbent Jim Leach, a Republican, was unseated by newcomer Dave Loebsack, a Democrat.

Iowa was one of seven states in which the party that won the state's popular vote did not win a majority of seats in 2006, the other states being New Mexico, Nevada, Michigan, Ohio, Indiana, and Wisconsin.

== Overview ==
United States House of Representatives elections in Iowa, 2006
Party	Votes	Percentage	Seats	+/−
Republican	522,388	50.57%	2	−2
Democratic	492,937	47.72%	3	+2
Independents	17,656	1.71%	0	—
Totals	1,032,981	100.00%	5	—

== District 1 ==
2006 Iowa's 1st congressional district election
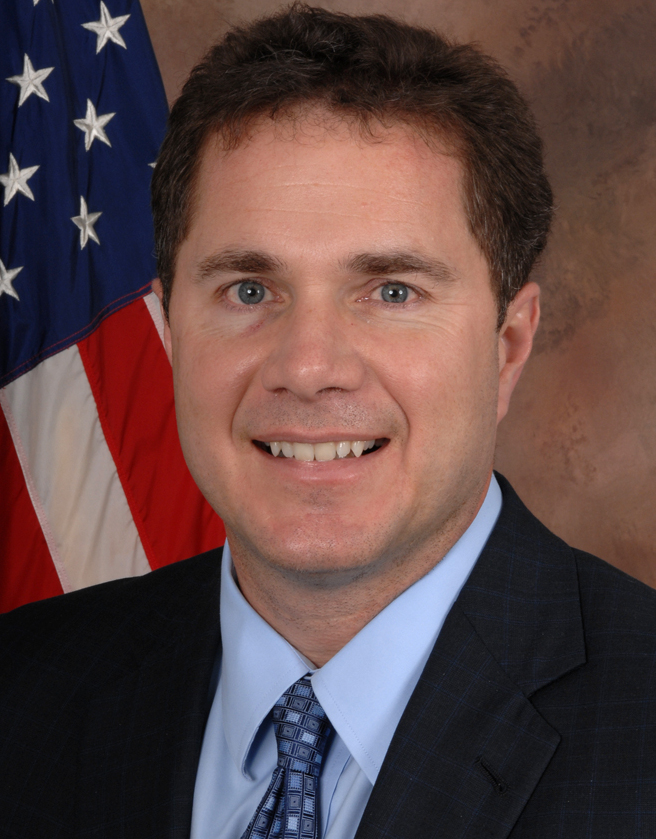

Nominee	Bruce Braley	Mike Whalen
Party	Democratic	Republican
Popular vote	114,322	89,729
Percentage	55.1%	43.3%
- County results Braley: 50–60% Whalen: 50–60%
U.S. Representatives before election
Jim Nussle
Republican
Elected U.S. Representatives
Bruce Braley
Democratic

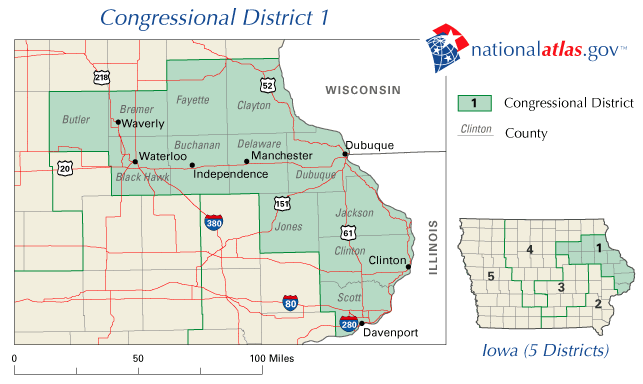

Regarded as one of the more hotly contested races in the nation, Republican nominee Mike Whalen of Bettendorf, the operator of the Heart of America Restaurants and Inns (HOARI) chain, took on Democratic candidate Bruce Braley, an attorney from Waterloo. The seat had been vacated when incumbent Jim Nussle announced his run for Iowa governor.

In the Democratic primary, Braley defeated Rick Dickinson, Bill Gluba and Denny Heath. Whalen got the GOP nod over Bill Dix and Brian Kennedy. Following an election that was peppered with negative attack ads from both sides, Braley defeated Whalen by a solid margin. Braley's victory meant that, for the first time since 1976, a Democrat would be serving the district.

=== Endorsements ===
Bruce Braley (D)

Individuals

- Wesley Clark, General, 2004 democratic presidential candidate

==== Predictions ====
Source	Ranking	As of
The Cook Political Report	Lean D (flip)	November 6, 2006
Rothenberg	Lean D (flip)	November 6, 2006
Sabato's Crystal Ball	Lean D (flip)	November 6, 2006
Real Clear Politics	Lean D (flip)	November 7, 2006
CQ Politics	Lean D (flip)	November 7, 2006

Iowa's 1st congressional district election, 2006
Party	Candidate	Votes	%
Democratic	Bruce Braley	114,322	55.10
Republican	Mike Whalen	89,729	43.25
Pirate	James F. Hill	2,201	1.06
Independent	Albert W. Schoeman	1,226	0.59
Total votes		207,478	100.00
Democratic gain from Republican			

== District 2 ==
2006 Iowa's 2nd congressional district election
- November 7th, 2006
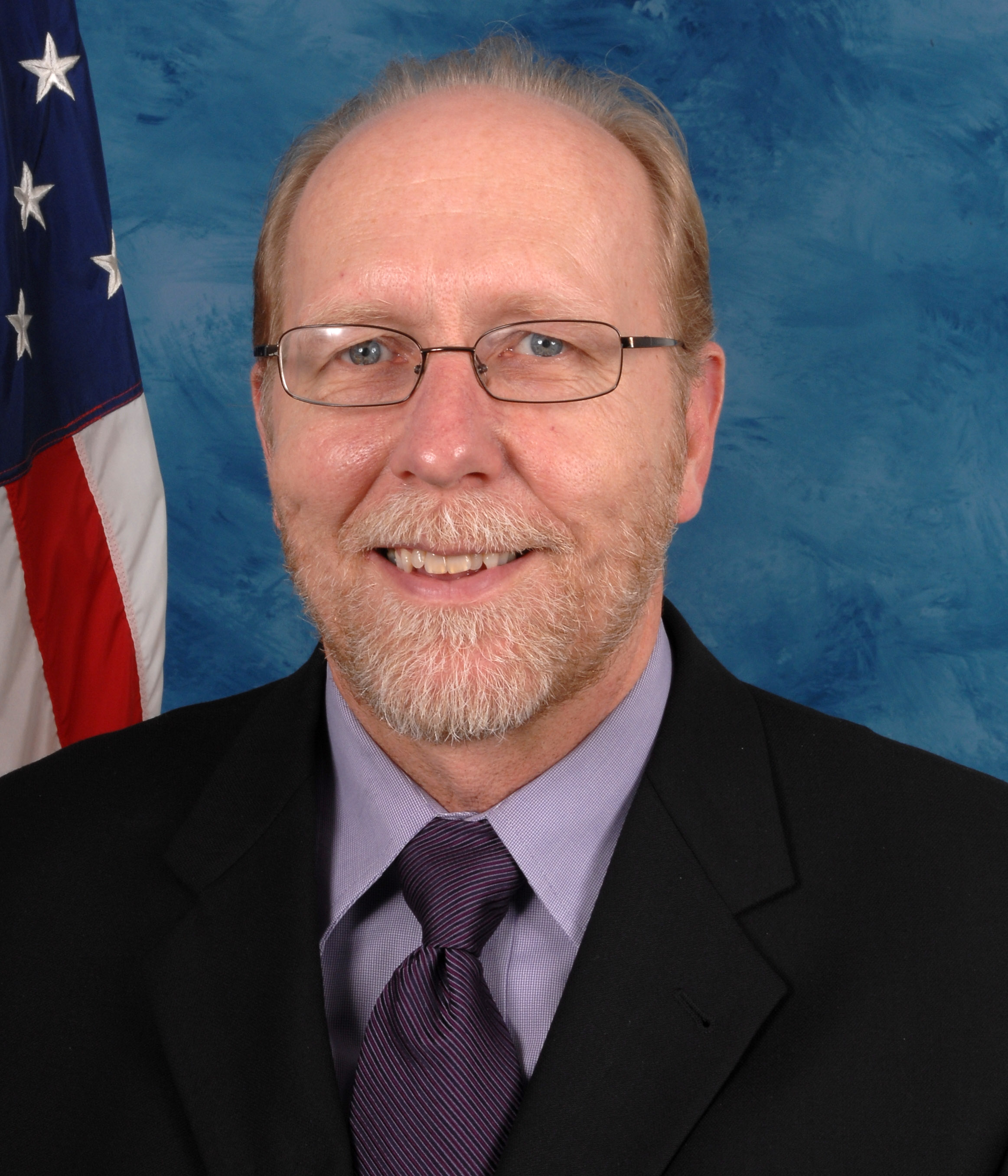

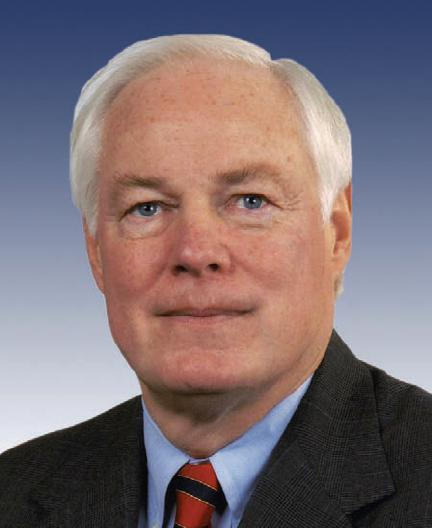
Nominee	Dave Loebsack	Jim Leach
Party	Democratic	Republican
Popular vote	107,683	101,707
Percentage	51.4%	48.6%
- County results Loebsack: 50–60% Leach: 50–60% 60–70%
U.S. Representative before election
Jim Leach
Republican
Elected U.S. Representative
Dave Loebsack
Democratic

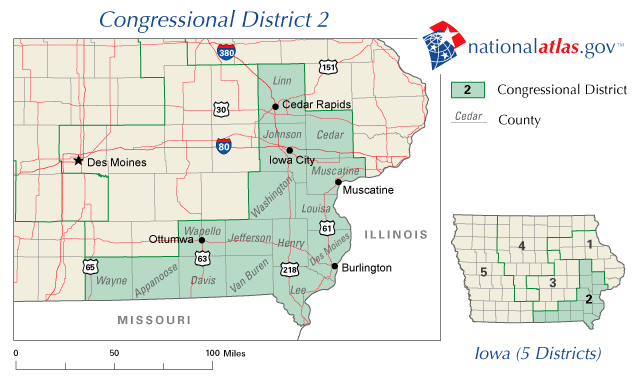

When the Iowa Secretary of State's office posted its list of primary candidates online in March, there was no Democratic candidate. However, Dave Loebsack of Mount Vernon, a political science professor at Cornell College, received write-in votes in the June 6 primary to become the Democratic nominee. Incumbent Jim Leach was the sole GOP candidate in the primary.

The campaign eventually heated up, as Loebsack was hoping to ride what he viewed as voter discontent with the Bush administration. Leach supporters continued to point to his strong integrity and status as one of the most liberal Republicans in the House.

On election night, Loebsack stunned many political observers by defeating Leach by a thin margin. Leach's defeat made him the most senior House member to lose re-election in 2006 and the most senior member to lose re-election since 42-year incumbent Jack Brooks lost to Steve Stockman in the 1994 Republican Revolution.

=== Predictions ===
Source	Ranking	As of
The Cook Political Report	Likely R	November 6, 2006
Rothenberg	Safe R	November 6, 2006
Sabato's Crystal Ball	Lean R	November 6, 2006
Real Clear Politics	Safe R	November 7, 2006
CQ Politics	Likely R	November 7, 2006

Iowa's 2nd congressional district election, 2006
Party	Candidate	Votes	%
Democratic	Dave Loebsack	107,683	51.43
Republican	Jim Leach (incumbent)	101,707	48.57
Total votes		209,390	100.00
Democratic gain from Republican			

== District 3 ==
2006 Iowa's 3rd congressional district election
- November 7th, 2006
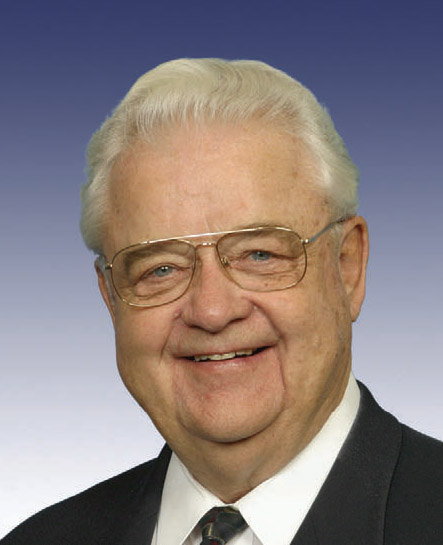

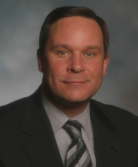
Nominee	Leonard Boswell	Jeff Lamberti
Party	Democratic	Republican
Popular vote	115,769	103,722
Percentage	51.9%	46.5%
- County results Boswell: 40–50% 50–60% Lamberti: 50–60% 60–70%
U.S. Representative before election
Leonard Boswell
Democratic
Elected U.S. Representative
Leonard Boswell
Democratic

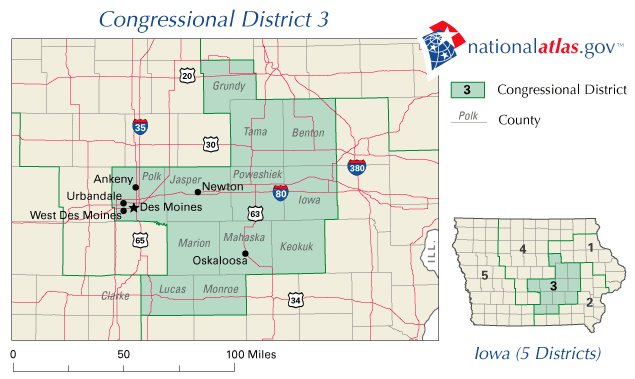

Five-term incumbent Leonard Boswell, a Democrat from Des Moines, took on Republican challenger Jeff Lamberti of Ankeny, a two-term state senator from the 35th District and the GOP's Senate leader. Both candidates were uncontested in the June 6 primary. Like in the first congressional district, the third district race was characterized by negative attack advertising and attention from national committees seeking to elect their candidate of choice. Boswell ultimately took advantage of the strong Democratic wave sweeping across the country and defeated Lamberti to win a sixth term.

2006 Iowa's 3rd congressional district debate
No.	Date	Host	Moderator	Link	Democratic	Republican
Key: P Participant A Absent N Not invited I Invited W Withdrawn						
Key: P Participant A Absent N Not invited I Invited W Withdrawn					Leonard Boswell	Jeff Lamberti
1	Oct. 3, 2006	Des Moines Register; KCCI	Kevin Cooney; Kathie Obradovich	C-SPAN	P	P

=== Endorsements ===
Leonard Boswell (D)

Individuals

- Wesley Clark, General, 2004 democratic presidential candidate

==== Predictions ====
Source	Ranking	As of
The Cook Political Report	Lean D	November 6, 2006
Rothenberg	Lean D	November 6, 2006
Sabato's Crystal Ball	Lean D	November 6, 2006
Real Clear Politics	Lean D	November 7, 2006
CQ Politics	Lean D	November 7, 2006

Iowa's 3rd congressional district election, 2006
Party	Candidate	Votes	%
Democratic	Leonard Boswell (incumbent)	115,769	51.90
Republican	Jeff Lamberti	103,722	46.50
Socialist Workers	Helen Meyers	3,591	1.61
Total votes		223,082	100.00
Democratic hold			

== District 4 ==
2006 Iowa's 4th congressional district election
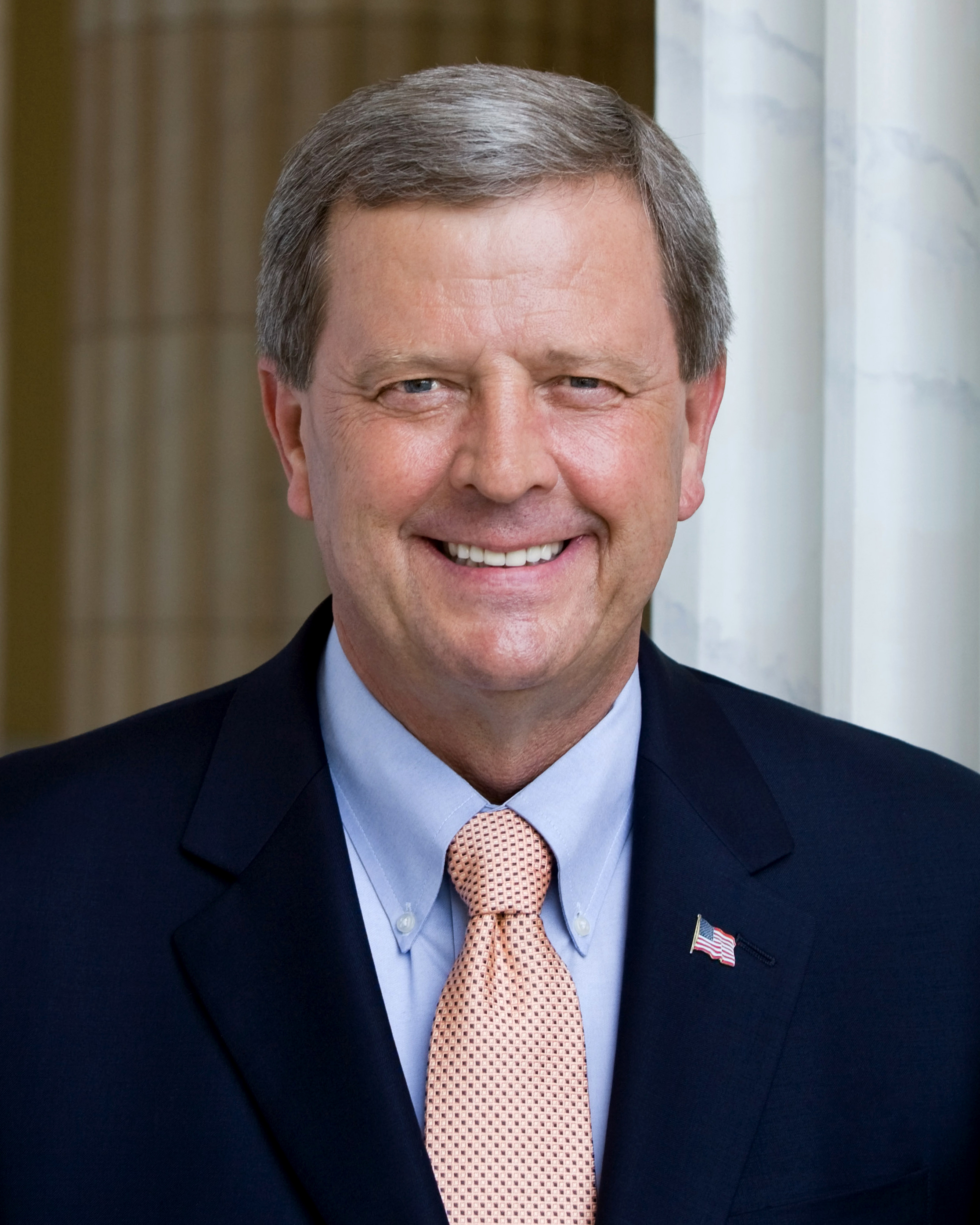

Nominee	Tom Latham	Selden Spencer
Party	Republican	Democratic
Popular vote	121,650	90,982
Percentage	57.2%	42.8%
- County results Latham: 50–60% 60–70% Spencer: 50–60%
U.S. Representative before election
Tom Latham
Republican
Elected U.S. Representative
Tom Latham
Republican

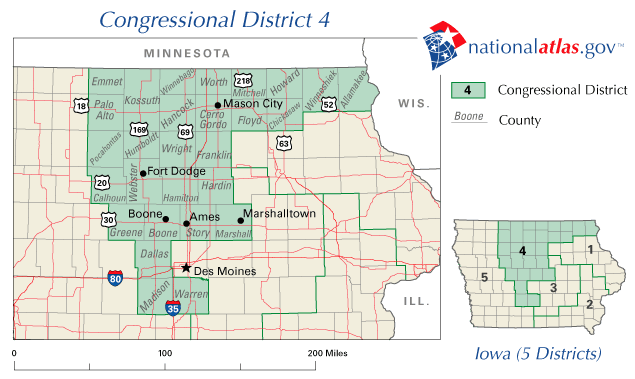

Seven-term Republican incumbent Tom Latham of Alexander faced Democratic nominee Selden Spencer, a neurologist from Huxley. Both candidates were unopposed in the June 6 primary. Although quiet by comparison to other races in Iowa, the Iraq War was a major point of contention between the candidates.

Though some political analysts expected the race to be a tough one, Latham defeated Spencer by a solid margin to win a seventh term.

=== Endorsements ===
Selden Spencer (D)

Individuals

- Wesley Clark, General, 2004 democratic presidential candidate

==== Predictions ====
Source	Ranking	As of
The Cook Political Report	Safe R	November 6, 2006
Rothenberg	Safe R	November 6, 2006
Sabato's Crystal Ball	Safe R	November 6, 2006
Real Clear Politics	Safe R	November 7, 2006
CQ Politics	Safe R	November 7, 2006

Iowa's 4th congressional district election, 2006
Party	Candidate	Votes	%
Republican	Tom Latham (incumbent)	121,650	57.21
Democratic	Selden E. Spencer	90,982	42.79
Total votes		212,632	100.00
Republican hold			

== District 5 ==
2006 Iowa's 5th congressional district election
- November 7th, 2006
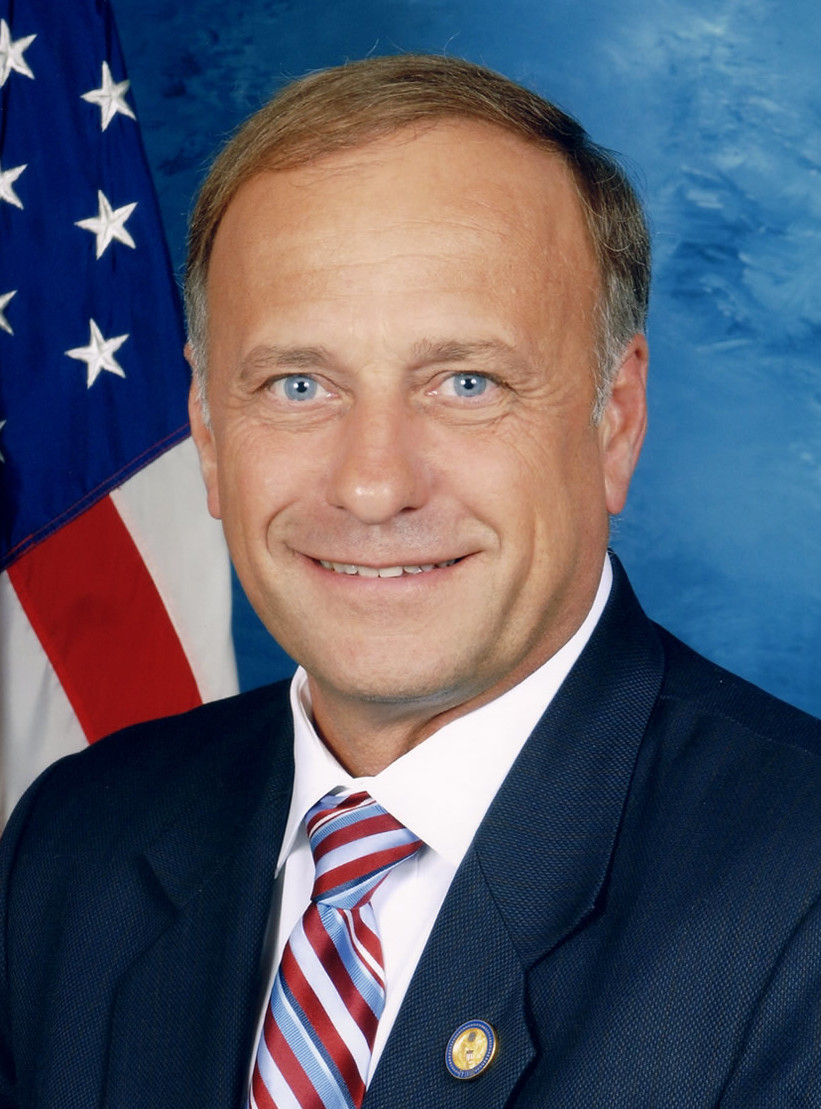

Nominee	Steve King	Joyce Schulte
Party	Republican	Democratic
Popular vote	105,580	64,181
Percentage	58.5%	35.6%
- County results King: 40–50% 50–60% 60–70% 70–80% 80–90% Schulte: 40–50%
U.S. Representative before election
Steve King
Republican
Elected U.S. Representative
Steve King
Republican

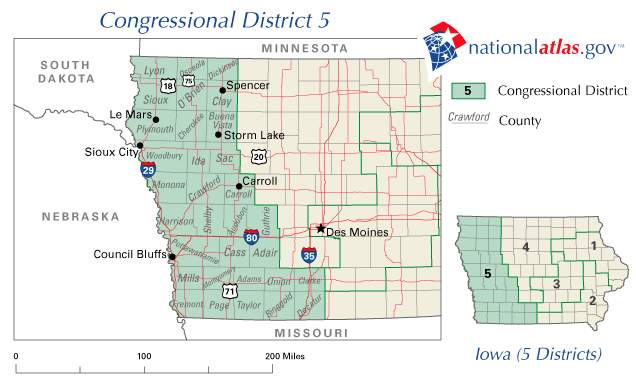

Republican Steve King of Kiron, a two-term incumbent, faced Democratic nominee Joyce Schulte of Creston. Schulte had defeated Robert Chambers in the June 6 primary, while King was unopposed. In the November 7 election, King defeated Schulte in a small landslide to win another term.

=== Predictions ===
Source	Ranking	As of
The Cook Political Report	Safe R	November 6, 2006
Rothenberg	Safe R	November 6, 2006
Sabato's Crystal Ball	Safe R	November 6, 2006
Real Clear Politics	Safe R	November 7, 2006
CQ Politics	Safe R	November 7, 2006

Iowa's 5th congressional district election, 2006
Party	Candidate	Votes	%
Republican	Steve King (incumbent)	105,580	58.53
Democratic	Joyce Schulte	64,181	35.58
Independent	Roy Nielsen	8,159	4.52
Independent	Cheryl L. Brodersen	2,479	1.37
Total votes		180,399	100.00
Republican hold			

== See also ==
- 2006 Iowa gubernatorial election
