= Populist Caucus =

United States political affiliation

The Populist Caucus refers to two short-lived caucuses that have been formed within the Democratic Party caucus in the United States House of Representatives. The first caucus was formed in February 1983 by 14 Democrats, primarily from rural areas. The second caucus was created in March 2009 by Democrat Bruce Braley of Iowa, who named the first caucus as a direct inspiration. The caucus included at least 33 members of the House, all of which are from the Democratic Party.

== Principles ==
Both versions of the caucus have cited an equitable tax structure as a main goal, including a strengthened graduated income tax.

The 1983 caucus also named breaking up monopolies, lowering oil and natural gas prices, appointing small business owners and farmers to the board of the Federal Reserve, insuring "reasonable" interest rates, curbing the power of special interest groups, and rolling back tax breaks for the wealthy and corporations as goals. After their formation, they encouraged their constituents to send them their gas bills to encourage Congress to fight for lower gas prices.

The 2009 caucus named universal health care, universal primary education, affordable college education, and fair trade principles such as "Buy American" provisions among their principles. Many of their positions, and ideology within the Democratic party were represented by the Bernie Sanders 2016 presidential campaign, and later his 2020 campaign, which were called progressive, or populist.

== Members of 1983 caucus ==
- Tom Harkin (D-IA) - Chair
- Jim Weaver (D-OR) - Chair
- Berkley Bedell (D-IA)
- Tom Daschle (D-SD)
- Byron Dorgan (D-ND)
- Lane Evans (D-IL)
- Al Gore (D-TN)
- Frank McCloskey (D-IN)
- Jim Oberstar (D-MN)
- Tim Penny (D-MN)
- Bill Richardson (D-NM)
- Gerry Sikorski (D-MN)
- Mike Synar (D-OK)
- Harold Volkmer (D-MO)
- Bob Wise (D-WV)

== Members of 2009 caucus ==
- Bruce Braley (D-IA) – Chair
- Mike Arcuri (D-NY) - Vice-Chair
- Peter DeFazio (D-OR) – Vice-Chair
- Rosa DeLauro (D-CT) – Vice-Chair
- Donna Edwards (D-MD) – Vice-Chair
- Keith Ellison (D-MN) - Vice-Chair
- Betty Sutton (D-OH) - Vice-Chair
- Leonard Boswell (D-IA)
- Steve Cohen (D-TN)
- Joe Courtney (D-CT)
- Lloyd Doggett (D-TX)
- Bob Filner (D-CA)
- John Garamendi (D-CA)
- Phil Hare (D-IL)
- Mazie Hirono (D-HI)
- Hank Johnson (D-GA)
- Steve Kagen (D-WI)
- Marcy Kaptur (D-OH)
- Dan Lipinski (D-IL)
- Dave Loebsack (D-IA)
- Ben Ray Luján (D-NM)
- Eric Massa (D-NY)
- Michael Michaud (D-ME)
- Tom Perriello (D-VA)
- Linda Sánchez (D-CA)
- Jan Schakowsky (D-IL)
- Carol Shea-Porter (D-NH)
- Brad Sherman (D-CA)
- Louise Slaughter (D-NY)
- Jackie Speier (D-CA)
- Paul Tonko (D-NY)
- Henry Waxman (D-CA)
- Peter Welch (D-VT)
- John Yarmuth (D-KY)
