= Dave Loebsack =

American politician (born 1952)

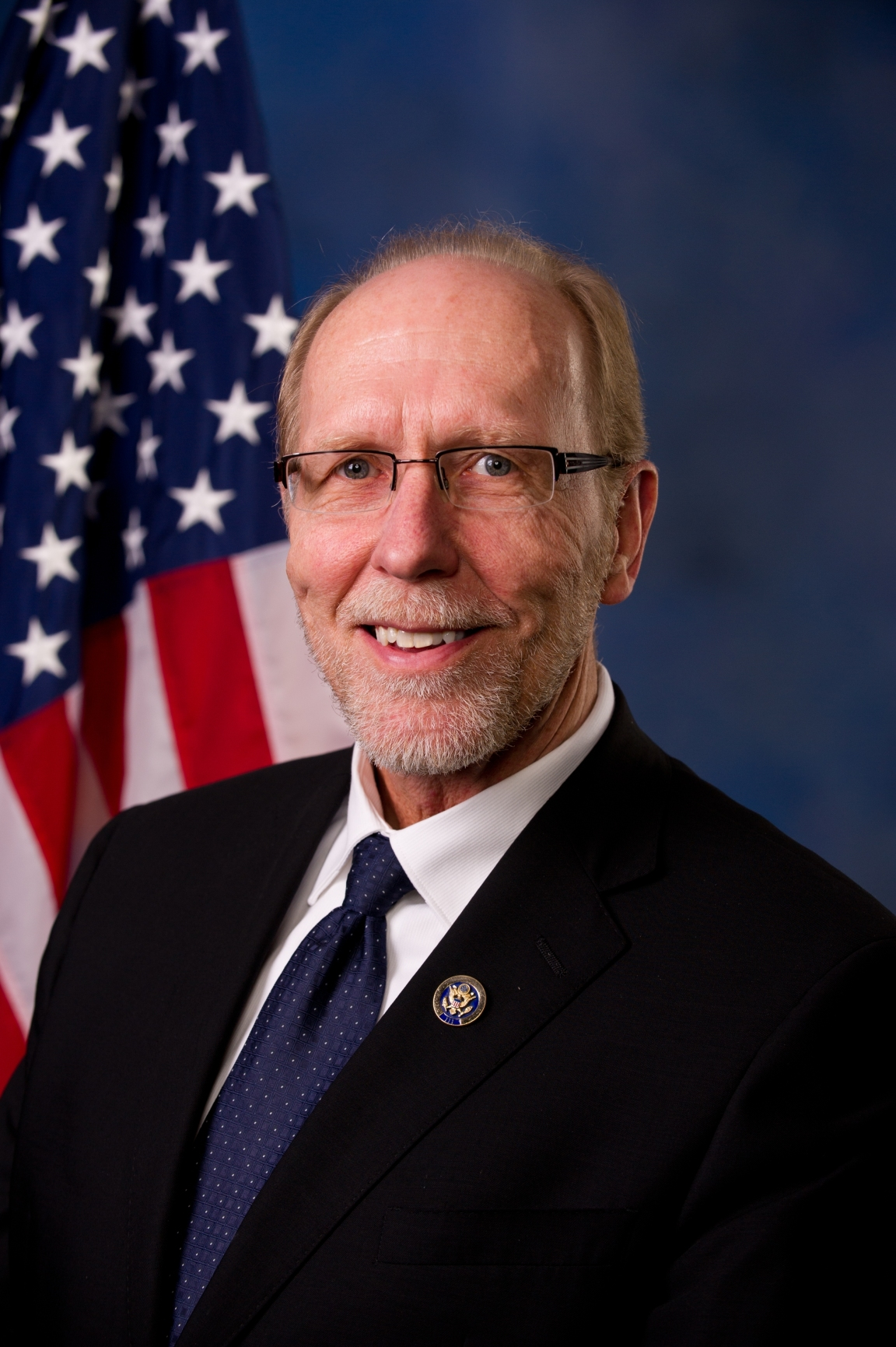

Member of the U.S. House of Representatives from Iowa's 2nd district
- In office January 3, 2007 – January 3, 2021
- Preceded by: Jim Leach
- Succeeded by: Mariannette Miller-Meeks

Personal details
- Born: David Wayne Loebsack; December 23, 1952 (age 73) Sioux City, Iowa, U.S.
- Party: Democratic
- Spouse: Terry Loebsack
- Children: 4
- Education: Iowa State University (BA, MA); University of California, Davis (PhD)
- Loebsack's voice Loebsack honoring Virginia Stratton, a retiring staffer. Recorded December 6, 2016

David Wayne Loebsack (/ˈloʊbˌsæk/; born December 23, 1952) is an American politician and political scientist who served as the U.S. representative for Iowa's 2nd congressional district from 2007 to 2021. A member of the Democratic Party, he also is an emeritus professor of political science at Cornell College, where he had taught since 1982. On April 12, 2019, Loebsack announced he would not seek reelection.

== U.S. House of Representatives ==
=== Committee assignments ===
- Committee on Armed Services
  - Subcommittee on Military Personnel
  - Subcommittee on Readiness
- Committee on Education and the Workforce
  - Subcommittee on Higher Education and Workforce Training
  - Subcommittee on Health, Employment, Labor, and Pensions

=== Caucus memberships ===
- Congressional Cement Caucus
- Congressional Progressive Caucus
- Congressional Arts Caucus
- Afterschool Caucuses

== Political campaigns ==
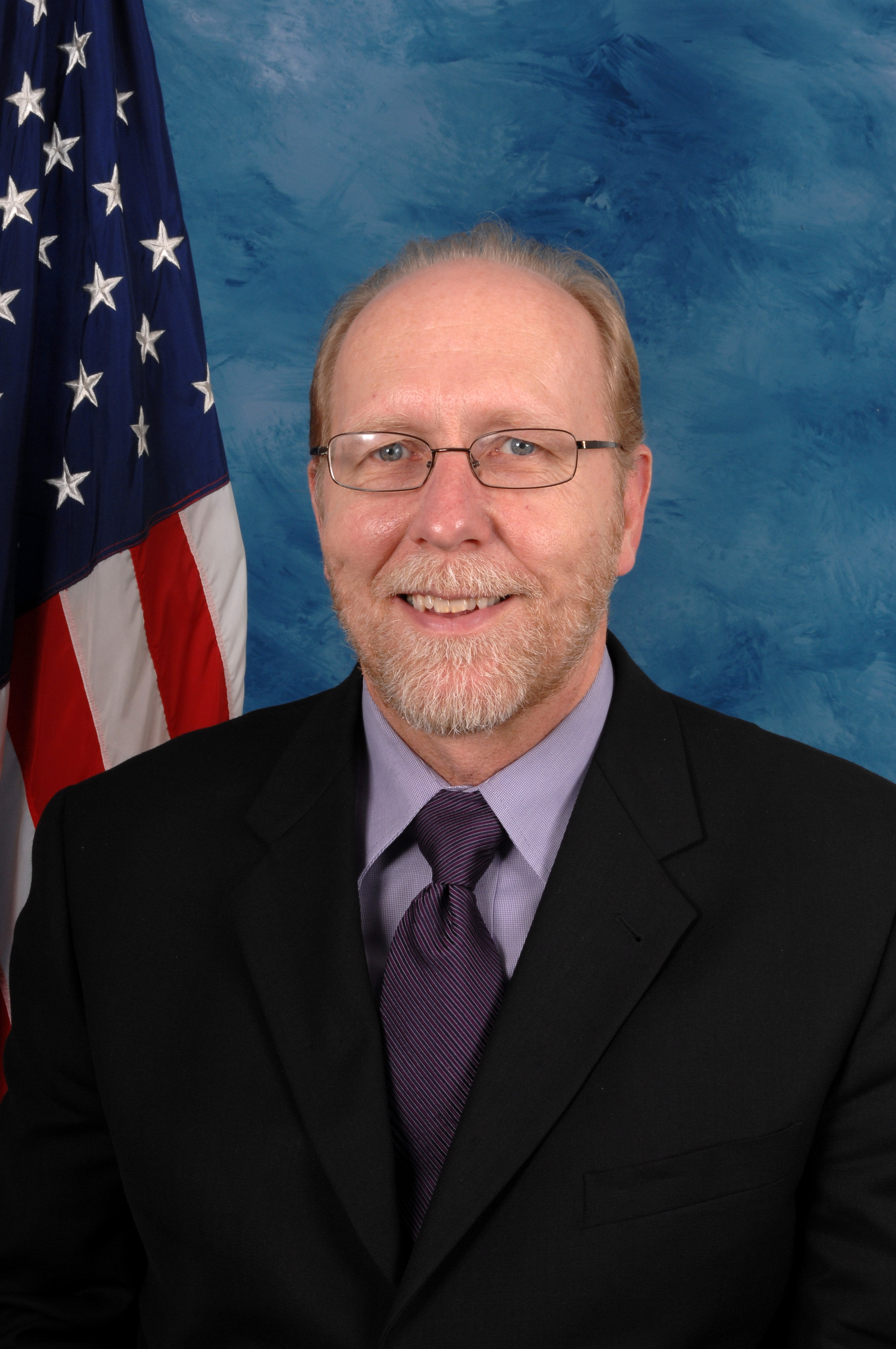
Loebsack during the 110th Congress, 2007

=== 2006 ===
In 2006, Loebsack narrowly defeated 15-term Republican incumbent Jim Leach in one of the biggest upsets of the cycle. Loebsack was nominated by a special convention of the 2nd District after failing to get the required number of signatures to be on the primary ballot. Since there was no one qualified for the ballot, the convention was called to determine the nomination. The 2nd had been trending Democratic for some time (a Republican presidential candidate had not carried it since 1984), and was considered the most Democratic-leaning district in the state. It was taken for granted that Leach would be succeeded by a Democrat once he retired, but he was not considered particularly vulnerable due to his moderate voting record, popularity, and longtime incumbency. Loebsack won largely by running up an 8,395-vote margin in Johnson County, home to Iowa City.

=== 2008 ===
Loebsack was easily reelected in 2008, taking 57 percent of the vote over Mariannette Miller-Meeks, a doctor from Ottumwa and the former president of the state medical society.

=== 2010 ===
Loebsack faced Miller-Meeks again in 2010 and had a much more difficult time of it than he had two years earlier. He prevailed with only 51% of the vote, largely by running up a 13,900-vote margin in Johnson County. Terry Branstad easily carried the district in his successful bid to reclaim the governorship. Chuck Grassley carried every county in the district except Johnson; in fact, Johnson was the only county Grassley lost in his bid for another term.

=== 2012 ===
After redistricting moved Loebsack's longtime home in Mount Vernon to the 1st District of fellow Democrat Bruce Braley, Loebsack moved to Iowa City in the reconfigured 2nd. The redrawn district is less Democratic than its predecessor; it regained Davenport, which had been the anchor of the 2nd and its predecessors for decades before being shifted out of the district in the 2000s round of redistricting.

Loebsack won the election with 55.4% of the vote. His Republican opponent, John Archer, got 42.5%; Alan Aversa, an independent candidate, received 2.2%. Braley won the 1st district with 56.9% of the vote.

=== 2014 ===
Loebsack beat Miller-Meeks, 52.5% to 47.5%. The 1st district went Republican, leaving Loebsack the only Democratic House member from Iowa.

=== 2016 ===
In October 2016, the Daily Iowan endorsed Loebsack, saying that while he was "not perfect" he displayed a "willingness to work with the other side" and had "maintained some degree of competence in office." Loebsack defeated surgeon Christopher Peters, 54% to 46%. Again, Loebsack was the only Democrat that Iowa sent to the House in 2016. The state was won by Donald Trump by a comfortable margin, and Republican Chuck Grassley was re-elected to the U.S. Senate by a landslide. Despite the Republican swing in Iowa, Loebsack managed to hold his position as a Democrat.

=== 2018 ===
In a rematch of the 2016 election, Loebsack defeated Peters by a comfortable margin with 54.8% of the vote. Democrats also flipped the 1st and 3rd districts in this election cycle; therefore, Loebsack was no longer the sole Democratic member of Iowa's congressional delegation.

== Tenure ==
=== Taxation ===
In November 2017, Loebsack was the only House member from Iowa to vote against the GOP tax reform bill, claiming the "tax plan that was rushed through the House of Representatives will hurt everyday Iowans."

=== Immigration ===
In September 2017, Loebsack told Ottumwa voters that he supports Dreamers. He said, "We've got to do everything we can to protect them."

=== 2020 presidential election ===
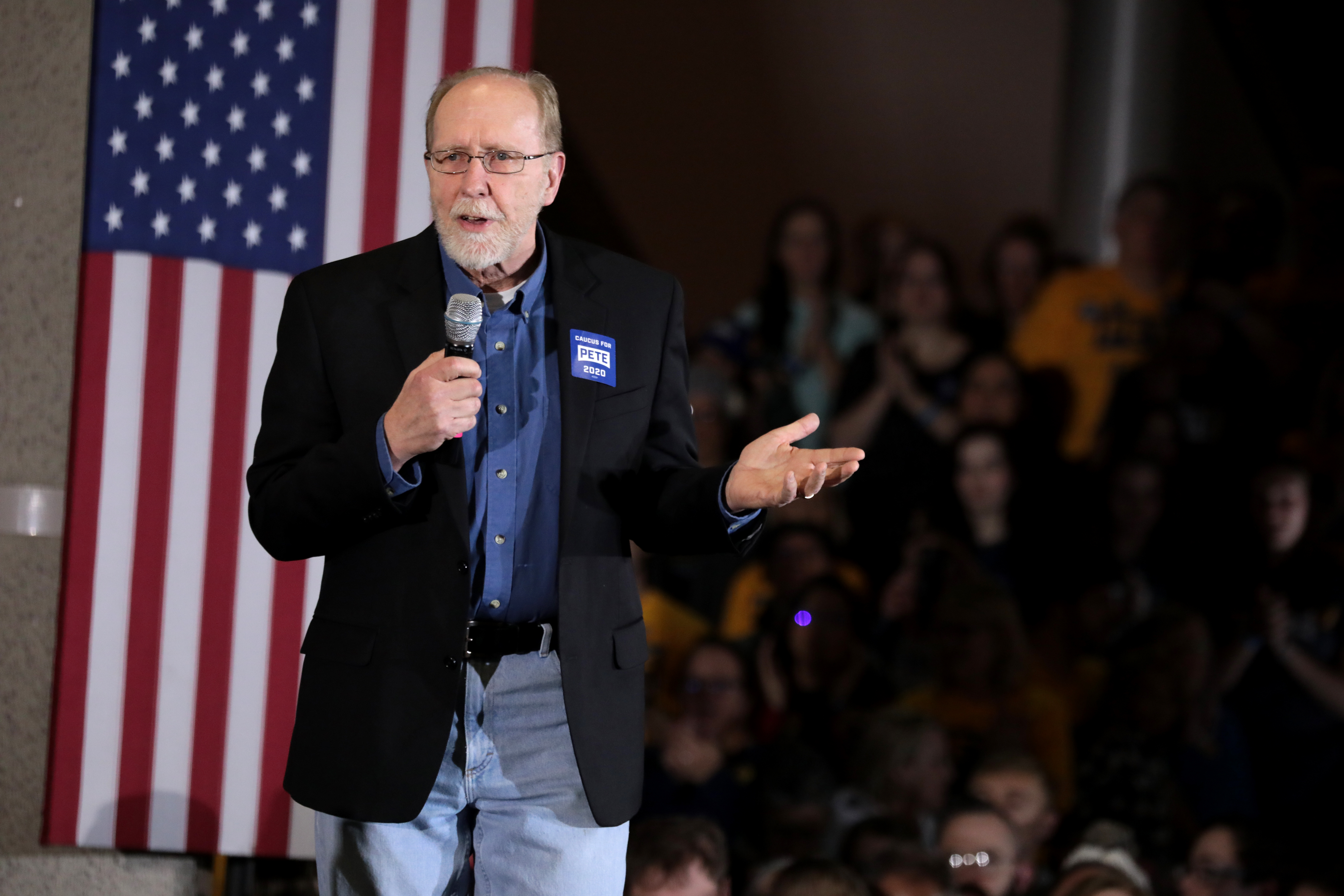
Loebsack speaking at a rally for Pete Buttigieg, January 2020

Ahead of the 2020 Iowa Democratic caucuses, Loebsack endorsed former South Bend, Indiana, mayor Pete Buttigieg for President of the United States. After Buttigieg withdrew from the primaries, he endorsed eventual Democratic nominee Joe Biden on March 12, 2020.

== Electoral history ==
=== 2006 ===
Iowa's 2nd congressional district election, 2006
Party	Candidate	Votes	%
Democratic	Dave Loebsack	107,683	51.38
Republican	James A. Leach (incumbent)	101,707	48.53
No party	Others	196	0.09
Total votes		209,586	100.00
Turnout			
Democratic gain from Republican			

=== 2008 ===
Iowa's 2nd congressional district election, 2008
Party	Candidate	Votes	%
Democratic	Dave Loebsack (incumbent)	175,218	57.19
Republican	Mariannette Miller-Meeks	118,778	38.77
Green	Wendy Barth	6,664	2.18
Independent	Brian White	5,437	1.78
No party	Others	261	0.09
Total votes		306,358	100.00
Turnout			
Democratic hold			

=== 2010 ===
Iowa's 2nd congressional district election, 2010
Party	Candidate	Votes	%
Democratic	Dave Loebsack (incumbent)	115,839	50.99
Republican	Mariannette Miller-Meeks	104,319	45.92
Libertarian	Gary Joseph Sicard	4,356	1.92
Constitution	Jon Tack	2,463	1.08
No party	Others	198	0.09
Total votes		227,175	100.00
Turnout			
Democratic hold			

=== 2012 ===
Iowa's 2nd congressional district election, 2012
Party	Candidate	Votes	%
Democratic	Dave Loebsack (incumbent)	211,863	55.57
Republican	John Archer	161,977	42.48
Independent	Alan Aversa	7,112	1.87
No party	Others	323	0.08
Total votes		381,275	100.00
Turnout			
Democratic hold			

=== 2014 ===
Iowa's 2nd congressional district election, 2014
Party	Candidate	Votes	%
Democratic	Dave Loebsack (incumbent)	143,431	52.48
Republican	Mariannette Miller-Meeks	129,455	47.36
Write-ins		443	0.16
Total votes		273,329	100
Democratic hold			

=== 2016 ===
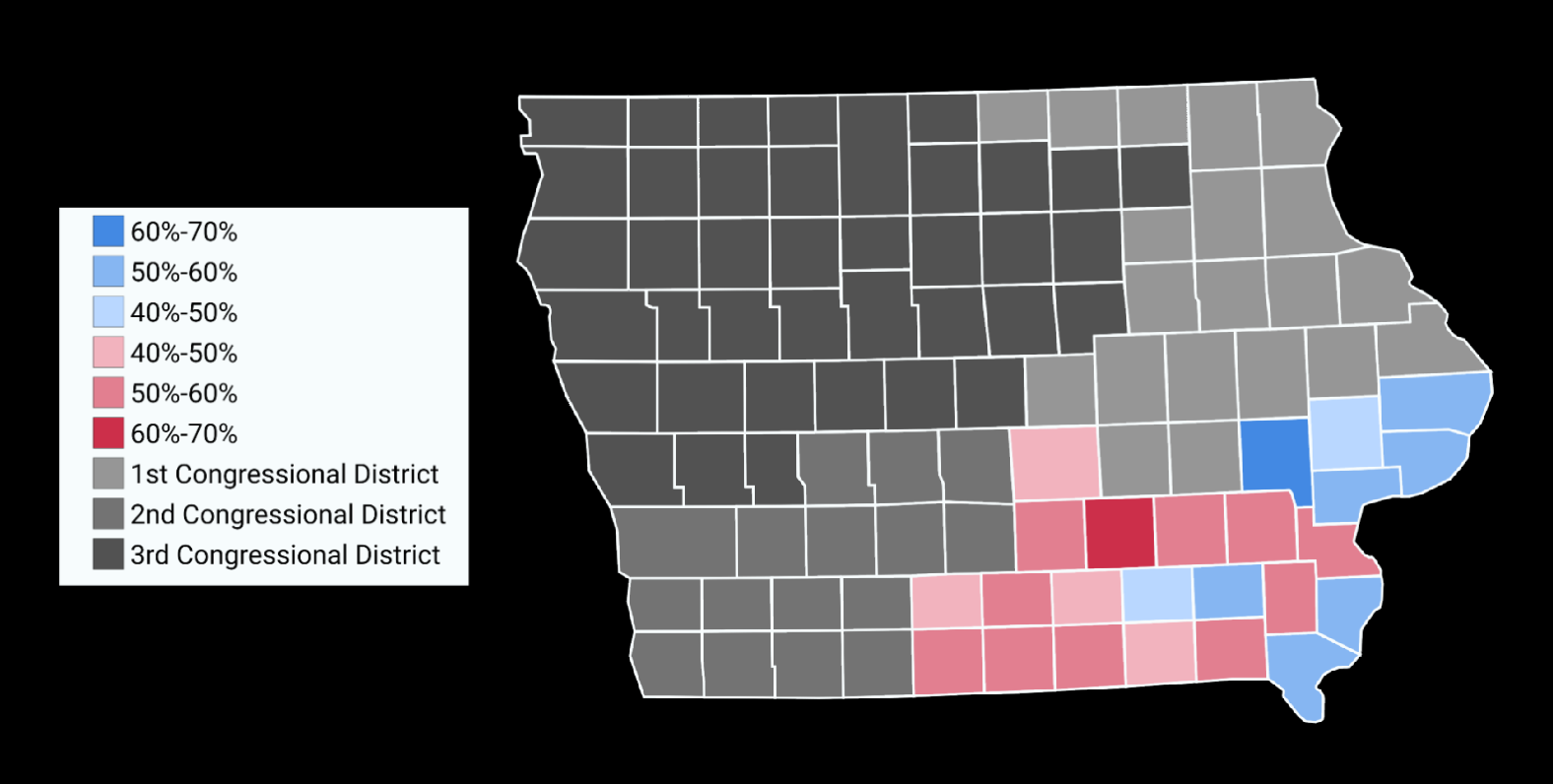
Map showing the results of the 2016 election in Iowa's second congressional district by county

Iowa's 2nd congressional district election, 2016
Party	Candidate	Votes	%
Democratic	Dave Loebsack (incumbent)	198,571	53.66
Republican	Christopher Peters	170,933	46.19
Write-ins		528	0.15
Total votes		370,032	100.00
Democratic hold			

=== 2018 ===
Iowa's 2nd congressional district, 2018
Party	Candidate	Votes	%
Democratic	Dave Loebsack (incumbent)	171,446	54.8
Republican	Christopher Peters	133,287	42.6
Libertarian	Mark Strauss	6,181	2.0
Independent	Daniel Clark	1,837	0.6
Write-ins		162	0.0
Total votes		312,913	100.0
Democratic hold			

U.S. House of Representatives
Preceded by Jim Leach	Member of the U.S. House of Representatives from Iowa's 2nd congressional district 2007–2021	Succeeded by Mariannette Miller-Meeks
U.S. order of precedence (ceremonial)
Preceded by Ted Poe as Former U.S. Representative	Order of precedence of the United States as Former U.S. Representative	Succeeded by Barry Goldwater Jr. as Former U.S. Representative
