= Bruce Braley =

American politician (born 1957)

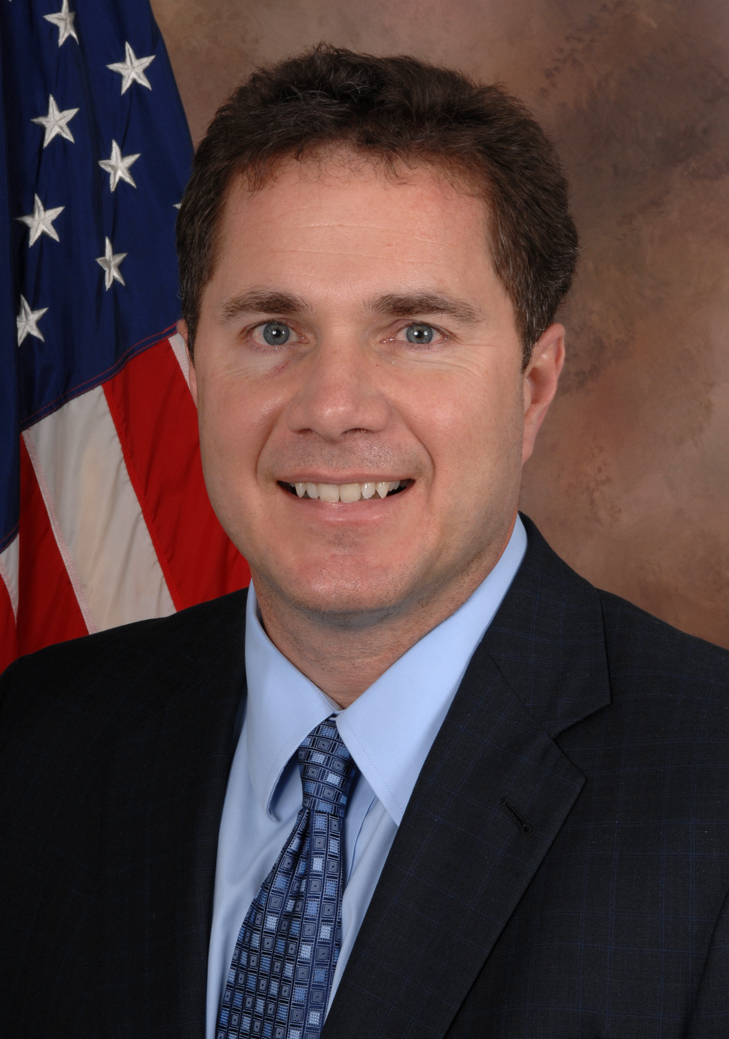
- Official portrait, 2007

Member of the U.S. House of Representatives from Iowa's 1st district
- In office January 3, 2007 – January 3, 2015
- Preceded by: Jim Nussle
- Succeeded by: Rod Blum

Personal details
- Born: Bruce Lowell Braley; October 30, 1957 (age 68) Grinnell, Iowa, U.S.
- Party: Democratic
- Spouse: Carolyn Braley
- Children: 3
- Education: Iowa State University (BA); University of Iowa (JD)

Bruce Lowell Braley (born October 30, 1957) is an American politician and attorney who served as the U.S. representative for Iowa's 1st congressional district from 2007 to 2015. A member of the Democratic Party, he was defeated in his attempt to win an open seat in the 2014 United States Senate election in Iowa.

== Early life, education, and law career ==
Braley was born in Grinnell, Iowa, the son of Marcia L. (née Sherwood) and Byard C. Braley. He has English, Scots-Irish, and German ancestry. His family owned a farm in nearby Brooklyn, Iowa. Braley attended college at Iowa State University where he was a member of Phi Kappa Psi fraternity. He earned his Juris Doctor from the University of Iowa College of Law. Braley worked as a trial lawyer in Waterloo with Dutton, Braun, Staack, & Hellman, PLC (now known as Dutton, Daniels, Hines, Kalkoff, Cook, & Swanson, P.L.C) for 23 years, beginning in 1983.

== U.S. House of Representatives ==
=== Elections ===
Braley won an open seat battle in the 1st district after eight-term Republican congressman Jim Nussle stepped down to make an unsuccessful run for Governor in 2006. The 1st district had been in Republican hands since 1979. However, eastern Iowa has swung heavily Democratic since the 1990s. The district has supported the Democratic candidate for President in every election since 1988 until the 2016 United States presidential election. The district, which was numbered as the 2nd District for most of the period from Iowa's statehood until 2003, became even more Democratic when much of the Quad Cities area, including Davenport and Bettendorf was shifted into it from the old 1st District (now the 2nd).

2006

In the 2006 midterm election, Braley defeated Republican opponent Mike Whalen, a Quad City businessman.

2008

Braley became the second member of Iowa's congressional delegation to issue an endorsement in the 2008 presidential race, announcing his support on December 5, 2007, for former North Carolina Senator John Edwards in a press conference in Waterloo. On April 30, 2008, Braley threw his support behind Senator Barack Obama following Edwards' withdrawal from the race.

2010

In 2010 Braley defeated GOP challenger Ben Lange, an attorney from Independence, by only about 4,000 votes out of more than 215,000 cast. Ultimately, a 4,300 vote margin in Braley's home county, Black Hawk County, allowed him to overcome coattails from Terry Branstad and Chuck Grassley and secure a third term. Grassley carried every county in the district; Branstad carried all but three.

2012

On April 3, 2012, Braley announced his reelection campaign in his hometown of Brooklyn, Iowa. Due to redistricting, Braley lost heavily Democratic Davenport but picked up equally Democratic Cedar Rapids and several other northeastern Iowa counties. Lange and Dubuque businessman Rod Blum announced their candidacy to run in a 1st District Republican primary to face Braley in a general election.

According to OpenSecrets, Braley led all Iowa Congressional candidates in out-of-state contributions, receiving about 3.5 times the amount of donations from out-of-state contributions as he has from in-state; a Republican activist and Braley's political opponent both filed House ethics complaints against Braley as a result, but the charges were found to be without merit. Braley raised an approximate total of $2.46 million for his re-election campaign, The sectors following two and three behind the lawyers and lobbyists were labor groups, and health groups, raising approximately $223,000 and $157,000 respectively. Braley spent approximately $2.11 million of what he raised being spent during the course of the campaign.

Lange won the Republican primary, and faced Braley in a rematch. In the general election, Braley won reelection by a much wider margin than in 2010.

=== Positions ===
The non-partisan, non-profit website OnTheIssues.org labels Braley a "Populist-Leaning Liberal."

Climate change

Braley told the Des Moines Register in a December 23, 2008 article that Congress cannot wait to enact reductions in greenhouse gas emissions, saying "We have ignored this problem for far too long."

On June 26, 2009, Braley voted to pass an emissions trading measure in order to limit greenhouse gas emissions and set new requirements for electric utilities.

Economy

Braley voted to pass the American Recovery and Reinvestment Act of 2009.

Braley supports raising the federal minimum wage from $7.25 to $10.10 per hour.

According to a press release from four-term Pennsylvania Republican Charlie Dent, in a display of bipartisanship, Braley sat with Dent at President Obama's 2012 State of the Union address. Afterwards Braley praised the address, saying: “I’m glad the President so strongly emphasized strengthening the middle class tonight. I was especially encouraged by his focus on economic fairness, creating jobs, and investing in education. The American middle class is being squeezed more than ever, yet Wall Street bankers and big corporations are making record profits.”

Braley opposes the construction of the Keystone XL pipeline.

Health care

On November 7, 2009, Braley voted for House passage of H.R. 3962, the Affordable Health Care for America Act, which included a public health insurance option.

On March 21, 2010, Braley voted for the final version of the Patient Protection and Affordable Care Act (PPACA).

Abortion

Braley has taken a pro-choice stance, having received 100% ratings from Planned Parenthood in 2008, 2010, and 2012, as well as 100% position ratings from NARAL Pro-Choice America in 2007, and 2009 through 2012. On May 4, 2011 Braley voted against HR 3, No Taxpayer Funding for Abortion Act, which passed the House 251 to 175. On October 13, 2011 he voted against HR 358, Amends Patient Protection and Affordable Care Act to Prohibit Abortion Coverage. This bill passed the House and was referred by the Senate to Committee. On May 31, 2012 Braley voted against HR 3541, the Prenatal Nondiscrimination Act of 2012. This bill failed to pass the House.

Firearms

Braley has received an "F" rating from the National Rifle Association of America.

Agriculture

Braley has received varied agricultural interest group ratings in his time in office. In 2007 he received a 90% rating from the National Association of Wheat Growers, as well as a 2007-08 91% rating from the American Farm Bureau Federation and a '07-08 100 Family Advocacy Score from the National Farmers Union. His ratings were maintained for the most part in 2008 with an 86% from the National Association of Wheat Growers, and a 2009-2010 score of 100% from the National Farmers Union. However he has recently fallen out of favor with the American Farm Bureau Federation, with his 2009-2010 rating being only 43% and his 2011 rating dropping a further ten points to 33%. On February 29, 2012, Braley voted against HR 1837 - Water Resources in the Sacramento-San Joaquin Valley which passed the House, and would require the Secretary of the Interior to reallocate water for irrigation purposes. On August 2, 2012, he voted for HR 6233 - Agricultural Disaster Assistance Act of 2012 which has passed the house and would provide supplemental agricultural disaster financial assistance for the 2012 fiscal year. Braley came under harsh criticism after it emerged that he had criticized Republican Senator Chuck Grassley as "a farmer from Iowa, who never went to law school"; a later press release emphasizing his background in the agricultural sector contained misspellings of basic farming terminology.

Tort reform

Braley has been a long time opponent of tort reform.

Government shutdown

Braley defended keeping the House gym open for members and lamented the cutbacks to the gym's services, including cancellation of towel service. Braley noted that gym was one of the few places where Democrats and Republicans could build relationships. He further noted, "...we pay a fee to belong to the House gym. So this is no different than if you're working for an employer that offers a wellness program."

Foreign policy

During a debate in September 2014, Braley stated that he had recently voted to authorize strikes against terrorists in Syria and Iraq. However, according to "The Weekly Standard," the vote cited by Braley was actually to arm Syrian rebels who are fighting ISIS. On June 19, 2014, Braley voted for an amendment to prohibit the use of funds for combat operations in Iraq.

=== Legislation ===
Braley sponsored 101 bills, including:

==== 110th Congress (2007–2008) ====
- H.R. 872, a bill to create a competitive grant program to promote education and training in bioenergy and other agricultural renewable energy sources, introduced February 7, 2007
- H.R. 1873, a bill to revise and expand small business contracts, introduced April 17, 2007
- H.R. 3381, a bill to prohibit the suspension of military active-duty deployment limits by the President for national security purposes from being used to deny the payment of a high-deployment allowance to a member of the Armed Forces if the member is otherwise qualified, introduced August 3, 2007
- H.R. 3548, a bill to require federal executive agencies to use Plain English in official documents, introduced September 17, 2007, reintroduced in the 111th Congress as H.R. 946. H.R. 946 was signed into law October 13, 2010.
- H.R. 5167, a bill to prohibit the President from granting immunity to the Iraqi government for torture and terrorism committed during the Gulf War unless certain conditions are met, introduced January 29, 2008
- H.R. 5620, a bill to establish minimum standards for good manufacturing practices for the minimal processing of produce, including sanitation and water standards, introduced March 13, 2008
- H.R. 6235, a bill to require that all flags used by the federal government be entirely manufactured in the United States, introduced June 11, 2008, reintroduced in the 111th Congress as H.R. 2853, in the 112th Congress as H.R. 1344, and in the 113th Congress as H.R. 2355
- H.R. 6861, a bill to increase punishments for employers who willfully violate child labor requirements, introduced September 10, 2008

==== 111th Congress (2009–2010) ====
- H.R. 508, a bill to allow for a $40 refundable tax credit, up to $80 per individual, for the purchasing of digital-to-analog converter boxes, introduced January 14, 2009
- H.R. 2891, a bill to create a loan repayment program for individuals who serve as health care professionals in underserved areas, introduced June 16, 2009, reintroduced in the 112th Congress as H.R. 531 and in the 113th Congress as H.R. 702. A modified version of this bill's program is included in the PPACA.
- H.R. 3051, a bill to require documents released by health insurance providers, including the government, to be written in Plain English, introduced June 25, 2009
- H.R. 4442, a bill to increase security measures for detecting explosive devices in airports and airplanes, introduced January 13, 2010
- H.R. 4512, a bill to require motor vehicle fuel be labeled with its country of origin and that such information be disclosed to consumers, introduced January 26, 2010, reintroduced in the 112th Congress as H.R. 2073 and in the 113th Congress as H.R. 5123
- H.R. 4584, a bill to support the development of wind energy, introduced February 3, 2010
- H.R. 5022, a bill to create a competitive grant program for expanding master's degree physical education programs, introduced April 14, 2010, reintroduced in the 112th Congress as H.R. 3597
- H.R. 5435, a bill to deny a tax deduction for income attributable to the domestic production, refining, processing, transportation, or distribution of oil and oil products, introduced May 27, 2010. An expanded version of this bill was introduced in the 112th Congress by Braley as H.R. 851.

==== 112th Congress (2011–2012) ====
- H.R. 319, a bill to allow veterans to have a day off from work on Veterans Day if they would otherwise be working, introduced January 19, 2011, reintroduced in the 113th Congress as H.R. 3368
- H.R. 1517, a bill to require the Department of Defense to develop a policy of preventing and responding to sexual assault and domestic violence, introduced April 13, 2011
- H.R. 2826, a bill to allow non-government employers to reduce their payroll taxes for a temporary time period and allow for a tax credit for employing former members of the National Guard and the Reserves and retaining such employment, introduced August 26, 2011. A similar bill was introduced in the 113th Congress by Braley as H.R. 3648.
- H.R. 3786, a bill to require federal executive agencies to use Plain English when revising or issuing new regulations, introduced January 18, 2012, reintroduced in the 113th Congress as H.R. 1557
- H.R. 4136, a bill to withhold 10% of federal highway fund allotments to any state that does not have laws prohibiting the passing of stopped school buses, introduced March 21, 2012, reintroduced in the 113th Congress as H.R. 4595
- H.R. 4284, a bill to prohibit livestock packers from owning, controlling, or feeding livestock to the extent that the producer no longer materially participates in such operations, with certain exceptions, introduced March 28, 2012
- H.R. 4373, a bill to reinstate and expand tax credits for adoption expenses, introduced April 17, 2012
- H.R. 5796, a bill to establish a fund for former hostages in Iran, to be funded through fines and penalties imposed on individuals linked to the hostage-taking, introduced May 17, 2012, reintroduced in the 113th Congress as H.R. 904 and H.R. 3200
- H.R. 6237, a bill to establish a grant program for small business development centers, with a maximum grant of $250,000, introduced July 31, 2012, reintroduced in the 113th Congress as H.R. 1283

==== 113th Congress (2013–2014) ====
- H.R. 3906, a bill to require congressional districts to be drawn by nonpartisan independent commissions, introduced January 16, 2014
- H.R. 4044, a bill to expand the child tax credit, introduced February 11, 2014
- H.R. 5509, a bill to expand the tax credits and deductions for college expenses and student loan interest rates, introduced September 17, 2014
- H.R. 5560, a bill to provide financial assistance to select individuals who would otherwise discontinue pursuing a degree because of lack of financial assistance, introduced September 18, 2014

=== Committee assignments ===
- House Committee on Oversight and Government Reform
- House Committee on Veterans' Affairs

=== Caucus memberships ===
Since 2008, Braley has been a member of the House Armenian Caucus. In 2009, Braley founded his own House caucus, the Populist Caucus. The caucus, which he chairs, now has 27 members. According to The Washington Post, it "is devoted to economic issues of interest to the middle-class, from the promotion of fair trade to the creation of well-paying jobs."

== 2014 U.S. Senate election ==
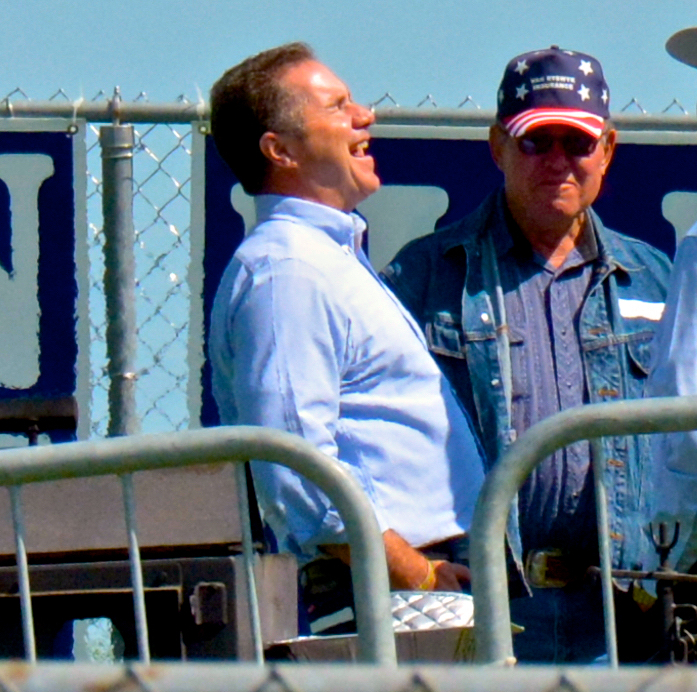
Braley campaigning for the U.S. Senate

In February 2013, Braley announced that he would seek the United States Senate seat held by retiring Senator Tom Harkin. Braley's entrance cleared the field of all potential Democratic challengers and he raised $2.6 million by the end of 2013. By February 2014, Braley had campaigned in all 99 counties of Iowa. On November 4, Braley was defeated by Republican state Senator Joni Ernst in the general election. Despite expectations of a close race, Ernst pulled away in the last week, and won by over eight percentage points, helped by a series of gaffes by Braley. Braley even lost his own district by less than a point.

=== House gym and towels comment ===
In October 2013, the government shutdown caused the House gym to lay off staff, including the towel attendants. Braley complained publicly about the lack of service in spite of paying to use the House gym, remarked, "There’s no towel service, and so we’re doing our own laundry down there." During the 2014 general election, Republicans brought this to the voters' attention.

=== "Farmer from Iowa" comment ===
In March 2014, video footage was discovered from a January 2014 fundraising event of trial lawyers in Texas in which Braley assured the audience that he would be a spokesman in Congress for trial lawyers, and commented that Republican Senator Chuck Grassley could become the next chair of the Senate Judiciary Committee if Democrats lose control of the Senate majority. In the video Braley criticized Grassley as "a farmer from Iowa, who never went to law school".

Following the release of the video, Braley issued an apology to Grassley. In response to the negative coverage generated by his comments, Braley issued a press release which touted his farming background. The press release included two misspellings of common farming terms. After the errors were pointed out, Braley's spokesman stated that he had "lost his fourth-grade spelling bee by mis-spelling 'journey.' I guess my old habits are hard to break." His gaffe was not only seen as an insult to Grassley, but also to Iowa's large farming population, prompting The Hill to name him as one of the "top 10 worst candidates of 2014."

=== Joni Ernst attack advertisement ===
In June 2014, Braley released a 30-second ad spot attacking Republican opponent Joni Ernst. The ad stated that despite the fact that Ernst was running as a fiscal conservative, when she “had the chance to do something in Iowa, we didn't hear a peep.” The ad stated that Ernst never sponsored a bill to cut pork or reduce spending during her time in the Iowa state Senate. Footage of a baby chicken chirping was shown during the ad, interpreted by some as comparing her to a chick. University of Iowa political science professor Timothy Hagle stated that there was a double standard of sexism between Republicans and Democrats, saying "Imagine if a GOP candidate had used a 'chick' in an ad against a female opponent."

=== VA committee attendance ===
In the wake of the Veterans Health Administration scandal of 2014, it was reported that Braley missed 15 of the 20 United States House Committee on Veterans' Affairs hearings in 2011 and 2012, including one hearing on a day in which he attended three fundraisers for his 2012 campaign, but which did not overlap with the hearing schedule. Braley's campaign responded by saying that he is an outspoken advocate for veterans. The campaign also said that Braley missed the hearing the day of the three fundraisers because he was at another hearing. The Des Moines Register reported that Braley was marked “present” at the other hearing but did not ask a question. The paper also reported that Braley was not seen on video of the hearing, although Braley's chair could not be seen at all times in the video. In examining an attack ad against Braley on this issue, PolitiFact called claims that Braley skipped hearings for fundraisers on September 20, 2012, "Mostly False" but said that Braley did miss close to 79 percent of committee hearings.

=== Dispute over chickens ===
In August 2014, Braley was criticized by Republicans for a dispute he had with his neighbor at his vacation home over the neighbor's "therapeutic" chickens, which Braley said were always in his yard. When the neighbor brought some eggs as a gift, his wife Carolyn turned them down and said she, Braley, and a few other homeowners complained about the chickens to the neighborhood homeowners’ association board. Braley was accused of threatening a lawsuit against the neighbor, which he emphatically denied, and said he handled the situation properly. However, the incident added to the damage caused by his derogatory remark about Senator Grassley being "a farmer from Iowa."

== Post-political career ==
In 2015, Braley joined the law firm Leventhal & Puga PC (now known as Leventhal Puga Braley PC) in Denver, Colorado.

== Electoral history ==
Year	Party	Incumbent	Status	Party	Candidate	Votes	%
2006	Republican	Jim Nussle	ran for United States House of Representatives	Democratic	Bruce Braley	113,724	55%
2006	Republican	Jim Nussle	ran for United States House of Representatives	Republican	Mike Whalen	89,471	43%
2008	Democratic	Bruce Braley	re-elected	Democratic	Bruce Braley	178,229	64%
2008	Democratic	Bruce Braley	re-elected	Republican	David Hartsuch	99,447	35%
2010	Democratic	Bruce Braley	re-elected	Democratic	Bruce Braley	104,428	49.51%
2010	Democratic	Bruce Braley	re-elected	Republican	Ben Lange	100,219	47.52%
2010	Democratic	Bruce Braley	re-elected	Libertarian	Rob J. Petsche	4,087	1.94%
2010	Democratic	Bruce Braley	re-elected	Independent	Jason A. Faulkner	2,092	0.99%
2012	Democratic	Bruce Braley	re-elected	Democratic	Bruce Braley	222,422	56.9%
2012	Democratic	Bruce Braley	re-elected	Republican	Ben Lange	162,465	41.6%
2012	Democratic	Bruce Braley	re-elected	Independent	Gregory Hughes	4,772	1.2%
2012	Democratic	Bruce Braley	re-elected	Independent	George Todd Krail II	931	0.2%

United States Senate election in Iowa, 2014
Party	Candidate	Votes	%	±%
Republican	Joni Ernst	588,575	52.10%	+14.84%
Democratic	Bruce Braley	494,370	43.76%	−18.90%
Independent	Rick Stewart	26,815	2.37%	N/A
Libertarian	Douglas Butzier	8,232	0.73%	N/A
Independent	Bob Quast	5,873	0.52%	N/A
Independent	Ruth Smith	4,724	0.42%	N/A
Write-in		1,111	0.10%	+0.02%
Total votes		1,129,700	100.00%	N/A
Republican gain from Democratic				

U.S. House of Representatives
Preceded by Jim Nussle	Member of the U.S. House of Representatives from Iowa's 1st congressional district 2007–2015	Succeeded by Rod Blum
Party political offices
Preceded by Tom Harkin	Democratic nominee for U.S. Senator from Iowa (Class 2); 2014	Succeeded by Theresa Greenfield
U.S. order of precedence (ceremonial)
Preceded by Greg Ganske as Former U.S. Representative	Order of precedence of the United States as Former U.S. Representative	Succeeded by Scott Klug as Former U.S. Representative
