= Executive Chamber of David Paterson =

The cabinet of Governor of New York David Paterson consisted of the executive chamber, and the heads of the various departments of the Government of New York. On Paterson's first day as governor, he asked for letters of resignation from all of the top staff members and state agency commissioners appointed by previous Governor Eliot Spitzer. This typical action does not mean the holdovers from the Spitzer administration will be replaced, and Paterson said that "having the letters gives him the flexibility to make changes if he decides to".

Paterson was responsible for appointing his Executive Chamber. These appointments did not require the confirmation of the New York State Senate. Most political advisors report to the Secretary to the Governor, while most policy advisors report to the Director of State Operations, who also answers to the Secretary to the Governor, making that position, in practice, the true Chief of Staff and most powerful position in the Cabinet. In the Executive Chamber of Eliot Spitzer, the literal Chief of Staff was in charge of the Office of Scheduling and held no authority over other cabinet officials. Paterson took a different approach, appointing Jon R. Cohen as titular Chief of Staff, although his function would be as a policy advisor.

The governor is also charged with naming the heads of the various departments, divisions, boards, and offices within the state government. These nominees require confirmation by the state Senate. While some appointees may share the title of commissioner, director, etc., only department-level heads are considered members of the actual state cabinet, although the heads of the various divisions, boards, and offices may attend cabinet level meetings from time to time.

== Executive Chamber ==
- Secretary to the Governor Charles J. O'Byrne (2008–)
  - First Deputy Secretary Val Grey (2008–)
  - Appointments Secretary Marty Mack
  - General Counsel Peter Kiernan (2008–)
    - First Assistant Counsel David Weinstein
    - Assistant Counsel to the Governor, Ethics Officer for the Executive Chamber and Records Access Officer Jeffrey Pearlman
  - Communications Director Peter Kauffman (2008–)
    - Press Secretary Marissa Shorenstein (2008–)
    - Director of Washington D.C. Office TBA
  - Chief of Staff (Senior Advisor) Charlotte Hitchcock (2008–)
  - Director of State Operations Dennis P. Whalen (2008–2009) Val Grey (2008–2009)
    - Deputy Director of State Operations Mark Lienung (2008–)
    - Policy Director TBA
    - Deputy Secretary for Education Duffy Palmer
    - Deputy Secretary for Economic Development and Infrastructure Tim Gilcrist
    - Deputy Secretary for Energy TBA
    - Deputy Secretary for the Environment TBA
    - Deputy Secretary For Government Operations And Labor Relations TBA
    - Deputy Secretary for Health Dennis P. Whalen (2008) Kristen Proud
    - Deputy Secretary for Public Safety TBA
    - Deputy Secretary for Intergovernmental Affairs Cathy Calhoun
    - Deputy Secretary for Public Finance and Local Governments TBA
    - Assistant Deputy Secretary for Health and Human Services TBA
    - Assistant Secretary for Criminal Justice TBA
    - Assistant Secretary for Energy TBA
    - Assistant Secretary for Homeland Security TBA

== Office of the Lieutenant Governor ==
- Richard Ravitch, 2009-2011

== Agencies, Departments and Divisions ==
- Office for the Aging, Director Michael J. Burgess (2008–)
- Department of Agriculture and Markets, Commissioner Patrick M. Hooker (2008–2011)
- Office of Alcoholism and Substance Abuse Services, Commissioner Karen M. Carpenter-Palumbo (2008–2011)
- Division of Budget, Director Robert L. Megna (2009–)
- Banking Department, Superintendent of Banking Richard H. Neiman (2008–2011)
- Office of Children and Family Services, Commissioner Gladys Carrion (2008–2011)
- Department of Civil Service, Commissioner Nancy Groenwegen (2008–)
- Division of Criminal Justice Services, Commissioner Denise O'Donnell (2008–2011)
- Department of Correctional Services, Commissioner Brian Fischer (2008–2011)
- Department of Education, Commissioner Richard P. Mills (2007–2008)
- Governor's Office of Employee Relations, Director Gary Johnson (2008–2011)
- Department of Environmental Conservation, Commissioner Alexander B. "Pete" Grannis (2008–2011)
- Office of General Services, Commissioner John C. Egan (2008–2011)
- Office of the Chief Information Officer, Chief Information Officer Melodie Mayberry-Stewart (2008–2011)
- Office of Health Insurance Programs & State Medicaid Director, Deputy Commissioner Deborah Bachrach (2008–2011)
- Housing Finance Agency and New York Mortgage Agency, President Priscilla Almodovar (2008–2011)
- Housing Finance Agency and New York Mortgage Agency Board, Chairman Judd Levy (2008–2011)
- Division of Housing and Community Renewal, Commissioner Deborah Van Amerongen (2008–2011)
- Department of Health, Commissioner Richard F. Daines (2008–2011)
- Division of Human Rights, Commissioner Galen Kirkland (2008–2011)
- Office of the State Inspector General, vacant
- Department of Insurance, Superintendent of Insurance Eric R. Dinallo (2008–2022)
- Department of Labor, Commissioner M. Patricia Smith (2008–2011)
- Office Of The Medicaid Inspector General, James G. Sheehan, Medicaid Inspector General (2008–2011)
- Office of Mental Health, Commissioner Michael F. Hogan (2008–)
- Office of Mental Retardation and Developmental Disabilities, Commissioner Diana Jones Ritter (2008–2011)
- Division of Military and Naval Affairs, Major General Joseph Taluto (2008–2011)
- Department of Motor Vehicles, Commissioner David Swarts (2008–)
- Office of Parks, Recreation & Historic Preservation, Commissioner Carol Ash (2008–2011)
- Office of the Prevention of Domestic Violence, Amy Barasch, executive director (2008–2011)
- Division of Parole, George B. Alexander, chief executive officer (2008–)
- Division of Probation and Correctional Alternatives, Director Robert Maccarone (2008–2011)
- Department of Public Service, Commissioner Garry A. Brown (2008–2011)
- Governor's Office Of Regulatory Reform, Director Robert Hermann (2008–2011)
- The Division Of State Police, Superintendent of Police Harry J. Corbitt (2008–2011)
- Department of Taxation and Finance, Acting Commissioner Jamie Woodward (2009–)
- Department of State, Secretary of State Ruth Noemí Colón (Acting) (2010–2011)
- Office of Temporary and Disability Assistance, Commissioner David A. Hansell (2008–2011)
- Department of Transportation, Acting Commissioner Stanley Gee (2009-), Commissioner Astrid C. Glynn (2008–2009)
- Office for Fire Prevention and Control, Floyd Madison, Fire Administrator (2008–2011)
