= Executive Chamber of Eliot Spitzer =

The cabinet of former New York Governor Eliot Spitzer consisted of his Executive Chamber, as well as the heads of the various departments of the Government of New York.

Spitzer was responsible for appointing his Executive Chamber. These appointments did not require the confirmation of the New York State Senate. Most political advisors report to the Secretary to the Governor of New York, who is the most powerful appointed cabinet official. Most policy advisors report to the Director of State Operations, who also answers to the Secretary to the Governor. The Chief of Staff is in charge of the Office of Scheduling and holds no authority over other cabinet officials.

== Executive Chamber ==
- Secretary to the Governor of New York Rich Baum (2007–2008)
  - First Deputy Secretary Sean Patrick Maloney (2007–2008)
  - Appointments Secretary Francine James (2007–2008)
  - General Counsel David Nocenti (2007–2008)
    - First Assistant Counsel Terryl Brown Clemons (2007–2008)
  - Communications Director Darren Dopp (2007), Christine Anderson (2007–2008)
    - Press Secretary Christine Anderson (2007), Errol Cockfield, Jr. (2007–2008)
    - Director of Washington D.C. Office Derek Douglas (2007–2008)
  - Chief of Staff Marlene Turner (2007–2008)
  - Director of State Operations Olivia Golden (2007–2008), Paul Francis (2008–2008)
    - Deputy Director of State Operations Kristin Proud (2007–2008)
    - Policy Director Peter Pope (2007–2008)
      - Senior Advisor Lloyd Constantine (2007–2008)
      - Senior Advisor Bruce Gyory (2007–2008)
      - Senior Advisor for Intergovernmental Affairs Mike Schell (2007–2008)
      - Special Counsel Richard Rifkin (2007–2008)
    - Deputy Secretary for Education Manuel Rivera (2007–2008)
    - Deputy Secretary for Economic Development and Infrastructure Timothy J. Gilchrist (2007–2008)
    - Deputy Secretary for Energy Paul DeCotis (2007–2008)
    - Deputy Secretary for the Environment Judith Enck (2007–2008)
    - Deputy Secretary For Government Operations And Labor Relations Sylvia B. Hamer (2007–2008)
    - Deputy Secretary for Health and Human Services Dennis P. Whalen (2007–2008)
    - Deputy Secretary for Public Safety Michael Balboni (2007–2008)
    - Deputy Secretary for Intergovernmental Affairs Marty Mack (2007–2008)
    - Deputy Secretary for Public Finance and Local Governments Lora Lefebvre (2007–2008)
    - Assistant Deputy Secretary for Health and Human Services Joe Baker (2007–2008)
    - Assistant Secretary for Criminal Justice Denise O'Donnell (2007–2008)
    - Assistant Secretary for Energy Tom Congdon (2007–2008)
    - Assistant Secretary for Homeland Security Lai Sun Yee (2007–2008)

== Office of the Lieutenant Governor ==
- Lieutenant Governor David Paterson (2007–2008)
- Chief of Staff to the Lieutenant Governor Charles J. O'Byrne (2007–2008)
  - Deputy Chief of Staff to the Lieutenant Governor Sarah Lewis (2007–2008)
  - Press Secretary to the Lieutenant Governor Armen Meyer (2007–2008)
- Counsel to the Lieutenant Governor Jeff Pearlman (2007–2008)
- Director of Policy, Office of the Lieutenant Governor Mark Leinung (2007–2008)
