= Errol Cockfield Jr. =

Personal details
- Born: September 14, 1973 (age 53) Georgetown, Guyana
- Party: Democratic
- Profession: Communications Director

Errol A. Cockfield Jr. (born September 14, 1973) currently serves as Senior Vice President of Communications at MSNBC where he is responsible for setting the communications and media strategy and partnering with editorial and business leads at the network. He also serves as lead spokesperson. Previously, he served as the Press Secretary to former Governor of New York Eliot Spitzer and his successor David Paterson. He was also the Chief of Staff in the New York State Senate Democratic Conference. Prior to that, Cockfield served as the Albany bureau chief for Newsday.

== Early life ==
He was born in Georgetown, Guyana. He graduated from Stony Brook University with a bachelor's degree in English. When he finished university, he took part in Tribune Company's prestigious Minority Editorial Training Program and after that became a member of the Los Angeles Times as a staff reporter.

Living and working in Los Angeles, Cockfield interviewed famous hip hop artists, and wrote about white power skinhead attacks on blacks, encouraging the Commission on Human Relations to pay attention to this trend.

== Journalistic career ==
Later he joined one of the biggest Connecticut's daily newspaper's Hartford Courant and after that Newsday, He worked there as a political reporter for Nassau County, New York, then he changed his position to New York City economic development reporter, and finally became Albany Bureau Chief.

In New York he also made some important professional achievements such as chronicling events World Trade Center after the attacks of September 11, 2001; He also detailed a plan to build a taxpayer-financed stadium for the New York Jets in Manhattan and wrote about reform of New York's stringent sentencing rules under its Rockefeller drug laws. He also documented the state's effort to reinstate the death penalty and became the first reporter to document information about insufficient actions of state government in the topic of assisted living facilities.

He had served as the President of New York Association of Black Journalists from 2001 to 2003, and also sat on the board of the National Association of Black Journalists, and has been a member of both since 1994. He has been a freelance contributor to magazines such as The Source, Upscale, and Vibe, has appeared on television and radio as a commentator on media, journalism and writing, and his original work has won several New York City poetry slam competitions.

== Political career ==
In 2007 Cockield was employed by former Governor Eliot Spitzer as Press Secretary for the Empire State Development Corporation. Then he got a promotion to Press Secretary, a position that reports to the Communications Director in the executive chamber. The job opened up when Spitzer suspended his communications director Darren Dopp following his involvement in a controversy, and the previous Press Secretary Christine Anderson was elevated to Communications Director.

In September 2007, he was named one of City Hall's "40 under 40" for being a young influential member of New York State politics.

In 2013, Cockfield was working as Vice President of crisis and issues at public relations firm Edelman New York when he was reported to be representing Peter Lanza, father of Sandy Hook Elementary School shooting perpetrator Adam Lanza.
