= Sean Patrick Maloney =

American politician (born 1966)

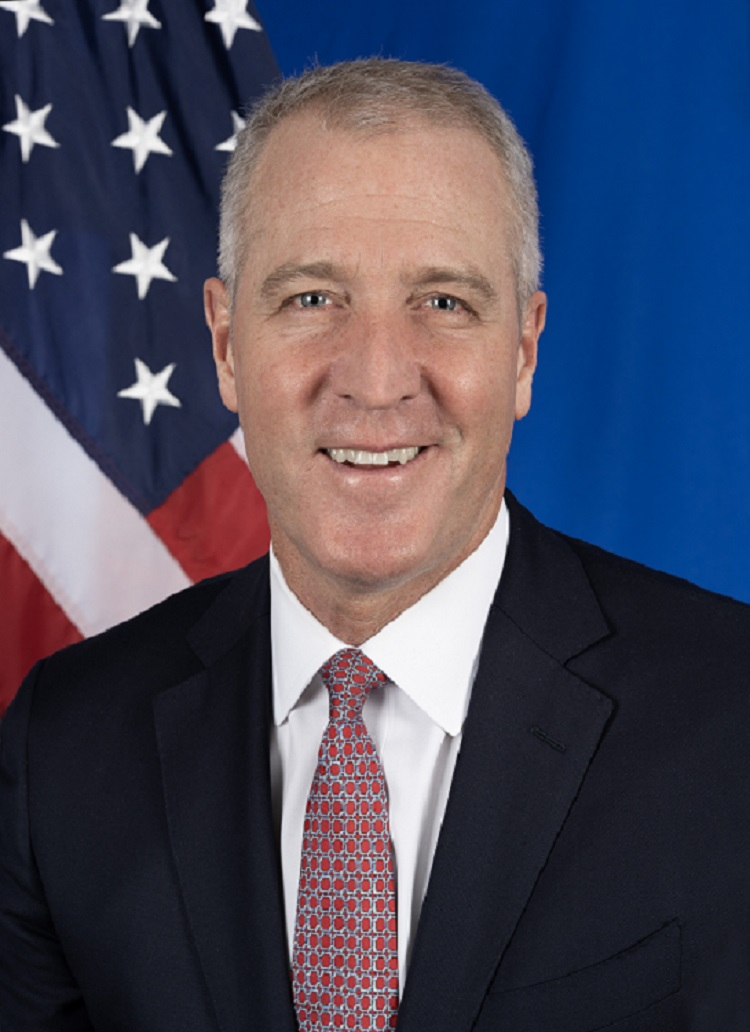
- Official portrait, 2024

United States Ambassador to the Organisation for Economic Co-operation and Development
- In office April 2, 2024 – January 20, 2025
- President: Joe Biden
- Preceded by: Jack Markell
- Succeeded by: John Hurley

Chair of the Democratic Congressional Campaign Committee
- In office January 3, 2021 – January 3, 2023
- Leader: Nancy Pelosi
- Preceded by: Cheri Bustos
- Succeeded by: Suzan DelBene

Member of the U.S. House of Representatives from New York's 18th district
- In office January 3, 2013 – January 3, 2023
- Preceded by: Nan Hayworth (redistricted)
- Succeeded by: Pat Ryan (redistricted)

White House Staff Secretary
- In office September 14, 1999 – January 20, 2000
- President: Bill Clinton
- Preceded by: Phillip Caplan
- Succeeded by: Lisel Loy

Personal details
- Born: July 30, 1966 (age 60) Sherbrooke, Quebec, Canada
- Party: Democratic
- Spouse: Randy Florke (m. 2014)
- Children: 3
- Education: University of Virginia (BA, JD)

Sean Patrick Maloney (born July 30, 1966) is an American attorney and politician who served as the U.S. ambassador to the Organisation for Economic Co-operation and Development from 2024 to 2025. He previously served five terms as the U.S. representative from New York's 18th congressional district from 2013 to 2023.

Maloney campaigned as a moderate and was a member of the centrist New Democratic Coalition while serving in Congress. He is the first openly gay person elected to Congress from New York State. He served as chair of the Democratic Congressional Campaign Committee from 2021 to 2023. In 2022, he lost re-election in New York's 17th congressional district to Republican Mike Lawler.

== Early life ==
Maloney was born on July 30, 1966, in Sherbrooke, Quebec, Canada, to American parents. His father's job as a lumberjack had temporarily brought them to Canada. Maloney grew up in Hanover, New Hampshire. He was raised with his six siblings in what he describes as a "small Irish Catholic family". Maloney graduated from Hanover High School in 1984.

After attending Georgetown University for two years, Maloney transferred to the University of Virginia, graduating with a Bachelor of Arts in international relations in 1988. He then spent a year volunteering with Jesuit priests in the slums of Chimbote, Peru, after which he returned to the U.S. and attended the University of Virginia School of Law, graduating with a Juris Doctor in 1992.

== Early political career ==
=== Clinton administration ===
In 1991, Maloney began working on Bill Clinton's first campaign for president as deputy to chief scheduler Susan Thomases. In Clinton's 1996 reelection campaign Maloney worked as Director of Surrogate Travel. After Clinton was reelected, Maloney was offered a position in the White House staff and served as a senior advisor and White House Staff Secretary from 1999 to 2000, among the youngest to serve in that capacity.

Following the killing of gay University of Wyoming student Matthew Shepard, Maloney was one of two representatives Clinton sent to his funeral. In an article about the event, a newspaper noted that Maloney often called himself "the highest-ranking openly homosexual man on the White House staff".

=== Attorney General campaigns ===
==== 2006 ====
Maloney ran for the Democratic nomination for New York Attorney General in 2006. According to Gay City News, his "competitive fundraising and wide travels across the state during the past year have impressed many party professionals with the seriousness of his run." During the campaign, Maloney was endorsed by the New-York-state-based gay rights organization Empire State Pride Agenda and Karen Burstein, the first lesbian to run for attorney general, in 1994.

Consistently polling in the single digits, Maloney was offered a chance to run for the office on the Liberal Party ticket but declined, saying he would support whoever won the Democratic nomination. Maloney finished third in the September 12 primary, with 9.4% of the vote. Former U.S. Secretary of Housing and Urban Development Andrew Cuomo won. In his concession speech, Maloney said, "[T]his day may not be the outcome we hope, but I make you a promise that there will be another day."

==== 2018 ====
In June 2018, Maloney again sought the Democratic nomination for attorney general of New York. He also sought re-election to the U.S. House of Representatives. Maloney indicated that, had he won the primary, he would have run for attorney general and ended his House re-election bid.

In the Democratic primary for attorney general, Maloney finished third. New York City Public Advocate Letitia James, who was endorsed by Governor Andrew Cuomo, won. Zephyr Teachout, a law professor endorsed by Senator Bernie Sanders and The New York Times, finished second. Maloney was endorsed by Beto O'Rourke, among other public figures.

=== First Deputy Secretary to the Governor of New York ===
Maloney joined Governor Eliot Spitzer's administration in January 2007 as First Deputy Secretary under top adviser Rich Baum.

The Eliot Spitzer political surveillance controversy (popularly known as "Troopergate") broke out on July 23, 2007, when Cuomo's office admonished Spitzer's administration for ordering the State Police to create special records of Senate Majority Leader Joseph Bruno's whereabouts when he traveled with police escorts in New York City. A New York Times editorial suggested that Maloney might have been involved by withholding emails during the investigation, and the Times endorsed Maloney's 2012 election opponent because of its concerns about Maloney's handling of the investigation. The Wall Street Journal wrote in July 2012, "[G]enerally, those involved in the investigation on both sides defend Mr. Maloney's conduct. Mr. Cuomo's chief of staff at the time, Steve Cohen, called the idea that Mr. Maloney got in the way of the Attorney General's inquiry 'misinformed to the point of being laughable.'"

Maloney continued in the same role as a top adviser to Governor David Paterson's administration under his top adviser, Charles O'Byrne. While working for Paterson, Maloney worked on Paterson's effort to increase state aid to education. On December 3, 2008, Maloney announced that he would leave Paterson's office to join the law firm of Kirkland & Ellis.

== Private sector work ==
From 2000 to 2003, Maloney served as chief operating officer of Kiodex, Inc. He was a senior attorney at the law firm Willkie Farr & Gallagher, during which time he represented the Matthew Shepard Foundation. Maloney became a partner in the law firm of Kirkland & Ellis LLP in 2009. In March 2011 he joined the law firm Orrick, Herrington & Sutcliffe as a partner. He is currently a Senior Advisor at the MarTech startup, Applecart.

== U.S. House of Representatives ==
=== Elections ===
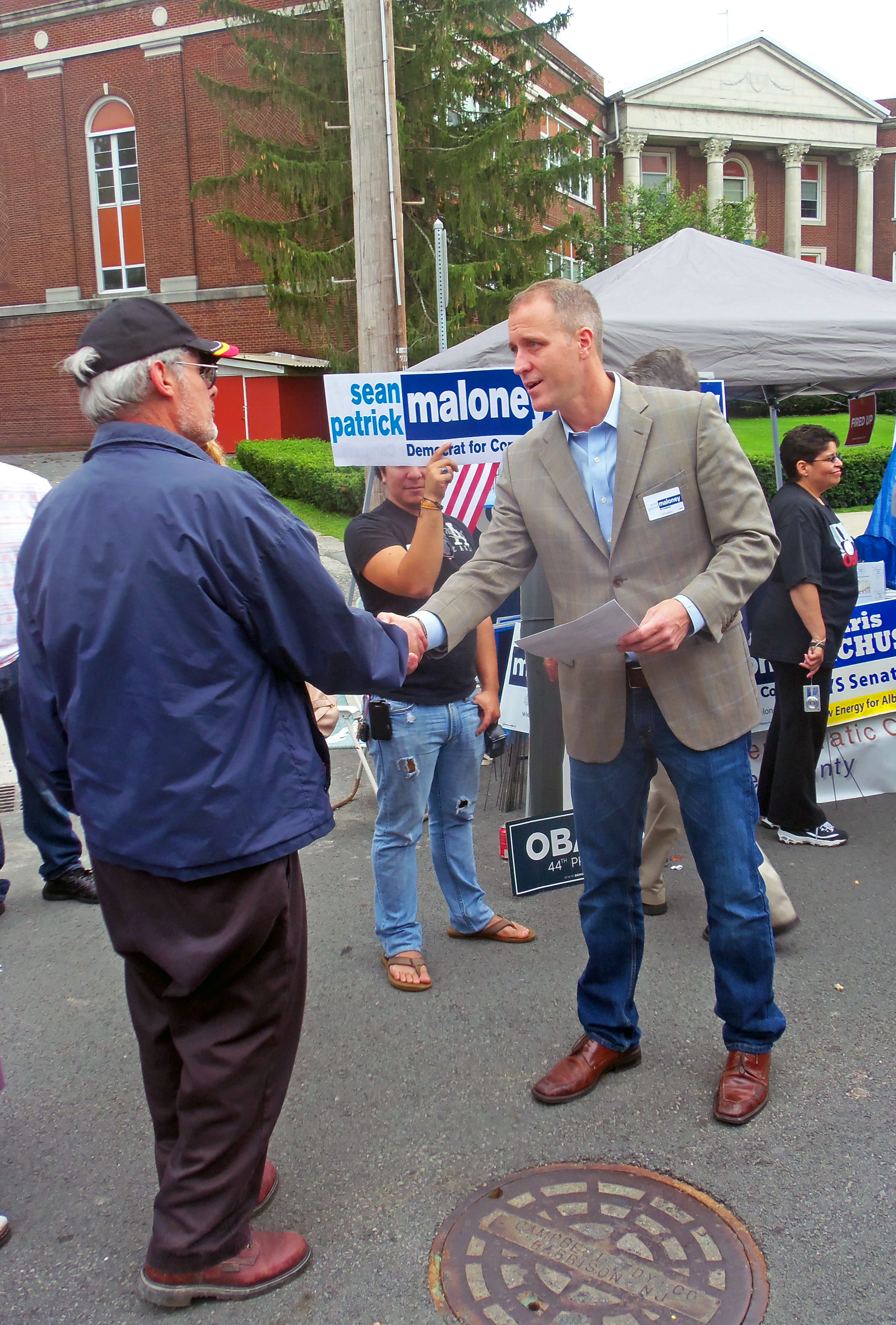
Maloney campaigning in Walden

==== 2012 ====
In March 2012, Maloney announced his intention to run for Congress in the 18th district. The district had previously been the 19th, represented by freshman Republican Nan Hayworth. Maloney won the Democratic primary on June 26 with 48% of the vote against four other challengers. In addition to the Democratic Party line, Maloney also ran on the Working Families Party ticket with New York's fusion voting.

Maloney drew criticism for buying a house in Cold Spring before the election, never having previously lived in the district.

Maloney was endorsed by Bill Clinton, The New York Times, Planned Parenthood, the AFL–CIO and New York State United Teachers (NYSUT).

During the general election campaign, Maloney campaigned as a moderate. One issue in the campaign was whether the candidates would vote to repeal the Defense of Marriage Act (DOMA). Hayworth was considered more progressive on gay rights than most Republicans, but did not explicitly say whether she would vote to repeal; instead, Hayworth opined that New York law allowing same-sex marriage made it a settled issue. Maloney criticized Hayworth for taking this position. On Election Day, Maloney defeated Hayworth, 52–48%. In his victory speech, Maloney said, "I think people want change in Washington. They're tired of the fighting and the bickering." Maloney is the first openly gay person to be elected to Congress from New York.

==== 2014 ====
Maloney ran for reelection in 2014, again facing Hayworth. He was a member of the Democratic Congressional Campaign Committee's Frontline Program, designed to help protect vulnerable Democratic incumbents in the 2014 election. Maloney lost the Independence Party primary to Hayworth, but defeated her in the general election by under 3,000 votes, with 84,415 votes (47.58%) to Hayworth's 81,625 (46.01%).

==== 2016 ====
Maloney ran for reelection in 2016. Fellow Democrat Diana Hird announced her intention to challenge him in the primary election on June 28, 2016, but failed to obtain the necessary number of signatures and file a petition to get on the ballot in time. Maloney handily defeated Republican Phil Oliva, with 162,060 votes (55.6%) to Oliva's 129,369 (44.4%).

==== 2018 ====
In June 2018, Maloney became the Democratic nominee for reelection to the House. He was also a candidate for the Democratic nomination for attorney general of New York, finishing third. Maloney stated that had he won the primary for attorney general, he would have ended his House re-election bid.

Remaining on the ballot for the House election, Maloney defeated Republican James O'Donnell, an Orange County legislator, with 139,564 votes (55.5%) to O'Donnell's 112,035 (44.5%).

==== 2020 ====
Maloney was reelected in 2020, with 54.8% of the vote to Republican nominee Chele Farley's 43.2%. On the day Maloney began his new term in Congress, January 3, 2021, he became chair of the Democratic Congressional Campaign Committee.

==== 2022 ====
Following redistricting, Maloney's residence was located in the 17th district, which was represented by Democrat Mondaire Jones. In 2022, Maloney chose to seek election in the 17th district rather than his longtime 18th district. According to City & State, “Jones was forced to make a choice with no great options. Run a primary against Maloney – powerful, experienced, with tons of money. Run a primary against Rep. Jamaal Bowman – a fellow Black progressive lawmaker [in the 16th district into which Jones’ home was now located]. Or not run at all.” Maloney's decision to seek election in the 17th district "angered many within his party" and "was considered controversial given Maloney’s role as the chair of the House Democrats’ campaign arm was to boost incumbents and protect the Democrats’ majority in the lower chamber". According to The Hill, Maloney's decision "infuriated Jones and his allies, particularly those in the Congressional Black Caucus, who accused Maloney of putting his own political survival over the interests of the party". Jones chose not to challenge Maloney. Instead, on May 20, 2022, Jones announced that he would seek election in the 10th district in New York City.

In 2024, sources from the Mondaire Jones campaign reported that Maloney had actually offered to withdraw from the race and hand the district to Mondaire, but the offer was denied by Mondaire Jones, who had polled against Jamaal Bowman in New York's 16th congressional district.

Displeased with Maloney's decision to seek election in the district represented by Jones, progressive state Sen. Alessandra Biaggi opted to run against Maloney in a Democratic primary. Maloney defeated Biaggi by a wide margin. After the primary, Biaggi endorsed Maloney in the 2022 general election.

During the campaign, Maloney relied heavily on his accomplishments through his time in Congress, including his work on addressing climate change and drinking water infrastructure.

Shortly before the election, Maloney claimed that voters worried about rising costs should save money by eating Chef Boyardee. Lawler and his supporters immediately denounced the remarks, claiming that it showed how elitist and out of touch with ordinary people Maloney is. The remark became a regular Republican talking point.

Leading up to Election Day, Maloney visited various European cities "for gatherings billed as DCCC fundraising events". Maloney also dismissed Republican campaign spending in his district as "'lighting [money] on fire'". While Maloney helped his fellow Democrats with their elections during the 2022 cycle, he eventually rushed back to his own district for last-minute campaigning once he realized that Republican Assemblyman Mike Lawler might defeat him.

Lawler narrowly defeated Maloney in the general election in an upset. Lawler's victory marked "the first general election defeat for a campaign chair of either party since 1980". Maloney's defeat was "a major upset" and "a humiliating loss for Democrats". Maloney's loss, together with other Republican wins in New York districts, helped Republicans win a majority in the House of Representatives in 2022.

=== Tenure ===
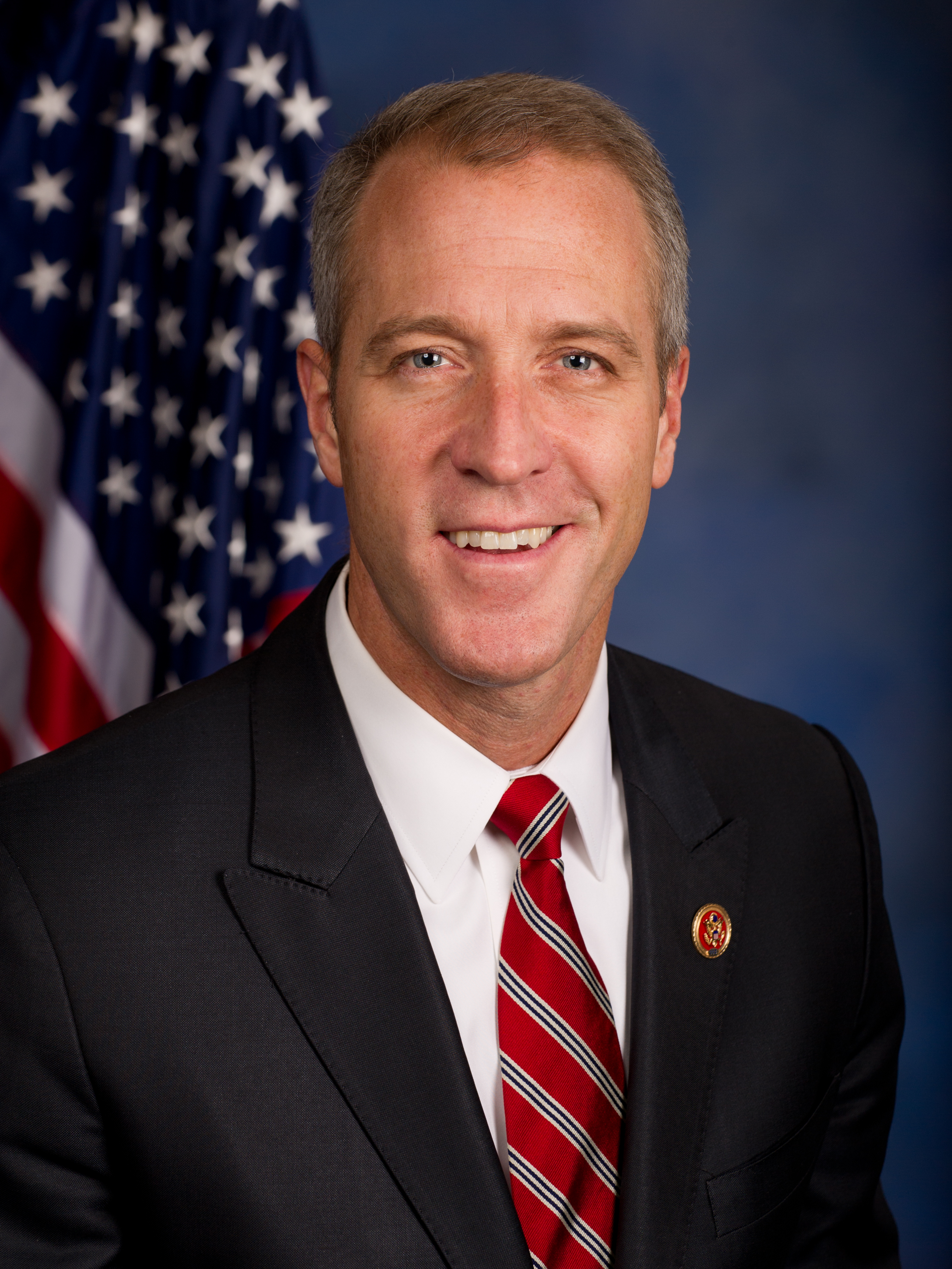
Sean Patrick Maloney, Official Portrait, 113th Congress

On January 3, 2013, Maloney was sworn into the 113th United States Congress. On his second day in office, he spoke on the House floor, criticizing a delay in federal Hurricane Sandy aid and urging House Speaker John Boehner and his colleagues to pass an aid package.

After joining the "No Labels" Problem Solvers Caucus, Maloney supported the "No Budget, No Pay Act of 2013". Leading up to the 2013 government shutdown, he faced criticism for voting with Republicans to pass a budget that included provisions delaying the implementation of the Patient Protection and Affordable Care Act. His vote drew the ire of LGBT groups, some accusing him of being a "Democrat in Name Only" ("DINO"). He has been an outspoken critic of sequestration and the harmful effects it would have on the United States Military Academy at West Point, and he sent President Barack Obama and Secretary of Defense Chuck Hagel a letter asking for flexibility in his district. During the shutdown, Maloney requested that his pay be withheld in solidarity with federal workers.

In October 2013, the House passed the Disabled Veterans Red Tape Reduction Act with near unanimous support. The bill would allow disabled veterans to have their medical examinations performed by physicians outside the Veterans Affairs system.

In July 2013, Maloney voted against the Farm Bill. The bill failed in the House due largely to the votes of eight Democratic House members who joined the Republican majority.

On banking issues, Maloney voted in 2014 to repeal the section of Dodd-Frank that would prevent bank bailouts by the public. He voted for the Economic Growth, Regulatory Relief, and Consumer Protection Act in 2018; Elizabeth Warren nicknamed this bill the "Bank Lobbyist Act". Maloney called one opponent's characterization of the latter vote "unhinged", which earned him a rebuke for making remarks that could be considered sexist.

After the Supreme Court struck down provisions of the Defense of Marriage Act, Maloney said at a press conference that he was "no longer seen as less-than in the eyes of my country", having previously faced discrimination in the House, with his partner not eligible for benefits while members' opposite-sex partners were.

On April 10, 2014, Maloney introduced the Human Trafficking Prevention Act (H.R. 4449; 113th Congress), a bill that would require regular training and briefings for some federal government personnel to raise awareness of human trafficking and help employees spot cases of it. The bill passed the House on July 23, 2014.

In July 2014, the FAA began an investigation into whether unmanned aircraft used for Maloney's wedding violated the agency's ban on drone flights. A spokesman for Maloney, who was a member of the House Transportation and Infrastructure Committee's aviation subcommittee, which oversees the FAA, acknowledged that drones were hired.

Maloney positioned himself as an opponent of President Donald Trump and his agenda; however, he had voted in support of that agenda 23.3% of the time as of December 2019. According to City & State New York, Maloney had voted with Trump 35% of the time as of August 2018; at that time, Maloney referred to the statistic as a "bullshit metric".

As of June 2022, Maloney had voted in line with Joe Biden's stated position 100% of the time.

In 2021, Maloney became the first openly gay person to be elected chair of the Democratic Congressional Campaign Committee.

In March 2021, Maloney called for New York Governor Andrew Cuomo's resignation following allegations of sexual harassment and underreporting of COVID-19 nursing home deaths.

==== Hudson Highlands Conservation Reauthorization Act ====
Maloney's Highlands Conservation Reauthorization Act enabled the reauthorization and update of the original 2004 legislation. Hudson Valley Press wrote: "The legislation reauthorizes the Highlands Conservation Act through 2029, ensuring important work continues to preserve local lands, promote tourism, and protect wildlife and clean water sources across the region." The bill included approval for $10 million a year for the next six years to protect land in the 3.5-million-acre swath of the Highlands-Appalachian Mountains running through Pennsylvania, New Jersey, New York and northwestern Connecticut.

==== Hudson River Anchorage Ban ====
In June 2016, the U.S. Coast Guard released a plan to establish 10 additional anchorages between Yonkers, New York and Kingston, New York that would allow commercial vessels to anchor on the Hudson River. Proponents of this plan were seeking to formally codify industry practices which were already in place. Environmentalists, particularly Riverkeeper, argued against the expansion in anchorages; arguing that the plan would lead to ships and barges using the anchorages as "long-term parking lots". Residents were also concerned with increased noise and light pollution from anchored units. In 2021, Maloney-sponsored legislation banning current and future anchorage-site proposals on the Hudson was included in the Elijah E. Cumming Coast Guard Authorization Act and signed into law by President Joe Biden. Notably, Republican Orange County Executive Steve Neuhaus praised Maloney, saying "This is 100 percent Sean. The congressman got this done fighting for us in Washington".

=== Committee assignments ===
- Permanent Select Committee on Intelligence
  - Subcommittee on Counterterrorism, Counterintelligence and Counterproliferation
  - Subcommittee on Defense Intelligence and Warfighter Support
- Committee on Agriculture
  - Subcommittee on General Farm Commodities and Risk Management
  - Subcommittee on Horticulture, Research, Biotechnology, and Foreign Agriculture
- Committee on Transportation and Infrastructure
  - Subcommittee on Aviation
  - Subcommittee on Highways and Transit
  - Subcommittee on Water Resources and Environment

=== Caucus memberships ===
- New Democrat Coalition
- Problem Solvers Caucus
- LGBT Equality Caucus, Co-chair
- Children's Health Care Caucus
- Congressional Lupus Caucus
- Congressional Arts Caucus
- Congressional Autism Caucus
- Congressional Task Force on Alzheimer's Disease
- Congressional Taiwan Caucus
- Congressional Anti-Bullying Caucus
- CAN Caucus
- House Hellenic Caucus
- House Impact Aid Caucus

== Post-congressional career ==
On May 12, 2023, President Joe Biden nominated Maloney to become U.S. ambassador to the Organisation for Economic Co-operation and Development. With bipartisan support, he was confirmed by the United States Senate on March 12, 2024, by a vote of 63 to 31. He arrived in Paris on April 2, 2024, and presented his credentials to Secretary-General Mathias Cormann on the same day. He left the organization in January 2025.

In January 2026, Maloney became president and CEO of the Coalition for Prediction Markets, a pro-prediction market lobbying group.

== Personal life ==
Maloney has been with his husband, Randy Florke, since 1992; they met in New York City, where Maloney was helping plan the Democratic National Convention. Florke is an interior decorator who has been featured in O, The Oprah Magazine.

Maloney and Florke became engaged on December 25, 2013. They married in Cold Spring, New York, on June 21, 2014. Maloney became the second member of Congress to legally marry his same-sex partner while in office, the first being former Massachusetts Congressman Barney Frank in 2012.

Maloney and Florke have adopted three children; the family lives in Cold Spring.

Maloney is Roman Catholic.

== Electoral history ==
=== U.S. House of Representatives ===
New York's 18th congressional district, 2012 Democratic primary
Party	Candidate	Votes	%
Democratic	Sean Patrick Maloney	7,493	48.22%
Democratic	Richard H. Becker	5,036	32.44%
Democratic	Matthew C. Alexander	1,857	11.96%
Democratic	Duane Jackson	780	5.03%
Democratic	Thomas Wilson	356	2.29%
Total votes		15,522	100.0%

New York's 18th congressional district, 2012 general election
Party	Candidate	Votes	%
Democratic	Sean Patrick Maloney	132,456	47.84%
Working Families	Sean Patrick Maloney	11,389	4.11%
Total	Sean Patrick Maloney	143,845	51.95%
Republican	Nan Hayworth	113,386	40.95%
Conservative	Nan Hayworth	19,663	7.10%
Total	Nan Hayworth (incumbent)	133,049	48.05%
Total votes		276,894	100.0%
Democratic gain from Republican			

New York's 18th congressional district, 2014 Independence primary
Party	Candidate	Votes	%
Independence	Nan Hayworth	780	53.35%
Independence	Sean Patrick Maloney (incumbent)	682	46.65%
Total votes		1,462	100.0%

New York's 18th congressional district, 2014 general election
Party	Candidate	Votes	%
Democratic	Sean Patrick Maloney	76,235	42.60%
Working Families	Sean Patrick Maloney	12,758	7.13%
Total	Sean Patrick Maloney (incumbent)	88,993	49.73%
Republican	Nan Hayworth	66,523	37.17%
Conservative	Nan Hayworth	15,714	8.78%
Independence	Nan Hayworth	3,423	1.91%
Total	Nan Hayworth	85,660	47.87%
Independent	Scott A. Smith	4,294	2.40%
Total votes		178,947	100.0%
Democratic hold			

New York's 18th congressional district, 2016 general election
Party	Candidate	Votes	%
Democratic	Sean Patrick Maloney	140,951	48.37%
Independence	Sean Patrick Maloney	10,356	3.55%
Working Families	Sean Patrick Maloney	8,771	3.01%
Women's Equality	Sean Patrick Maloney	1,982	0.68%
Total	Sean Patrick Maloney (incumbent)	162,060	55.61%
Republican	Phil Oliva	111,117	38.13%
Conservative	Phil Oliva	16,968	5.82%
Reform	Phil Oliva	1,284	0.44%
Total	Phil Oliva	129,369	44.39%
Total votes		291,429	100.0%
Democratic hold			

New York's 18th congressional district, 2018 general election
Party	Candidate	Votes	%
Democratic	Sean Patrick Maloney	126,368	50.23%
Independence	Sean Patrick Maloney	7,726	3.07%
Working Families	Sean Patrick Maloney	3,929	1.56%
Women's Equality	Sean Patrick Maloney	1,541	0.61%
Total	Sean Patrick Maloney (incumbent)	139,564	55.47%
Republican	James O'Donnell	96,345	38.29%
Conservative	James O'Donnell	14,484	5.76%
Reform	James O'Donnell	1,206	0.48%
Total	James O'Donnell	112,035	44.53%
Total votes		251,599	100.0%
Democratic hold			

New York's 18th congressional district, 2020 general election
Party	Candidate	Votes	%
Democratic	Sean Patrick Maloney	170,899	50.95%
Working Families	Sean Patrick Maloney	12,914	3.85%
Independence	Sean Patrick Maloney	3,356	1.00%
Total	Sean Patrick Maloney (incumbent)	187,169	55.80%
Republican	Chele Farley	128,568	38.33%
Conservative	Chele Farley	16,530	4.93%
Total	Chele Farley	145,098	43.26%
Libertarian	Scott Smith	2,686	0.80%
SAM	Scott Smith	476	0.14%
Total	Scott Smith	3,162	0.94%
Total votes		335,429	100.0%
Democratic hold			

New York's 17th congressional district, 2022 general election
Party	Candidate	Votes	%
Democratic	Sean Patrick Maloney	130,999	45.6
Working Families	Sean Patrick Maloney	8,083	2.8
Total	Sean Patrick Maloney (Incumbent)	139,082	48.5
Republican	Mike Lawler	124,148	43.3
Conservative	Mike Lawler	17,573	6.1
Total	Mike Lawler	141,721	49.4
Write-in		5,885	2.0
Total votes		286,688	100.0
Republican gain from Democratic			

=== New York Attorney General ===
2006 New York Attorney General Democratic primary
Party	Candidate	Votes	%
Democratic	Andrew Cuomo	404,086	53.52%
Democratic	Mark Green	244,554	32.39%
Democratic	Sean Patrick Maloney	70,106	9.29%
Democratic	Charlie King	36,262	4.80%
Total votes		755,008	100%

2018 New York Attorney General Democratic Primary
Party	Candidate	Votes	%
Democratic	Letitia James	608,308	38.53%
Democratic	Zephyr Teachout	468,083	29.65%
Democratic	Sean Patrick Maloney	379,099	24.02%
Democratic	Leecia Eve	52,367	3.32%
Total votes		1,578,588	100%

== See also ==
- List of American politicians of Irish descent
- List of LGBT members of the United States Congress

Political offices
Preceded by Phillip Caplan	White House Staff Secretary; 1999–2000	Succeeded by Lisel Loy
U.S. House of Representatives
Preceded by Nita Lowey	Member of the U.S. House of Representatives from New York's 18th congressional district 2013–2023	Succeeded by Pat Ryan
Party political offices
Preceded by Cheri Bustos	Chair of the Democratic Congressional Campaign Committee; 2021–2023	Succeeded by Suzan DelBene
Diplomatic posts
Preceded by Jack Markell	United States Ambassador to the Organisation for Economic Co-operation and Development; 2024–2025	Succeeded by John Hurley
U.S. order of precedence (ceremonial)
Preceded by Tom Reed as Former U.S. Representative	Order of precedence of the United States as Former U.S. Representative	Succeeded by Eva Clayton as Former U.S. Representative
