= Jeffrey Pearlman =

American lawyer and judge

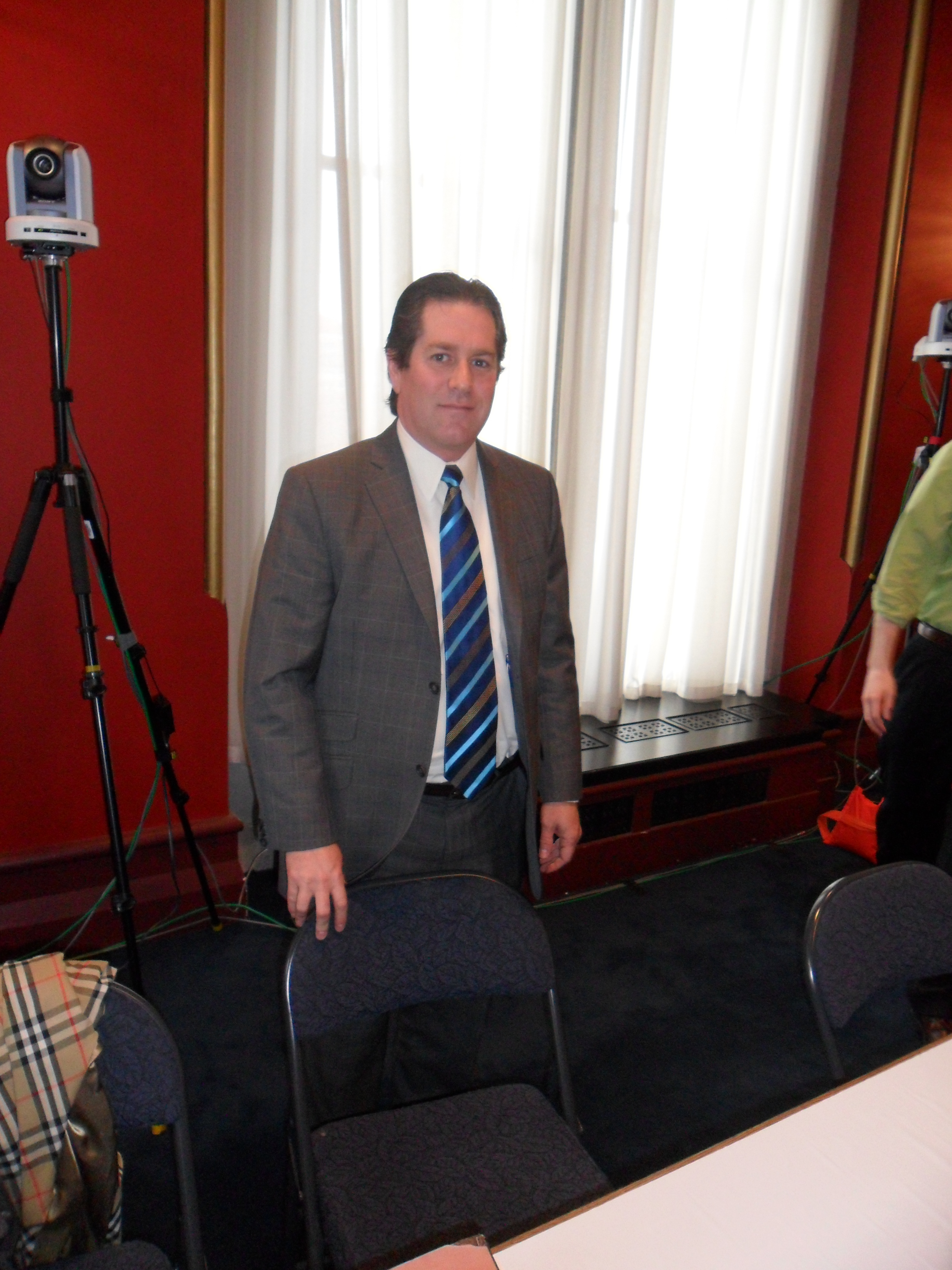
- Pearlman in 2013

Judge of the New York Court of Claims
- Incumbent
- Assumed office June 5, 2024
- Nominated by: Kathy Hochul

Personal details
- Born: Jeffrey Hayes Pearlman; 1966 (age 59–60) New York City, U.S.
- Party: Democratic
- Education: State University of New York at New Paltz
- Occupation: Judge

Jeffrey Hayes Pearlman (born 1966) is an Acting Supreme Court Justice in New York County and was formerly the director of the Authorities Budget Office

He previously served as Special Counsel to the Governor, Kathy Hochul and as Special Counsel to the Transition following the resignation of Governor Andrew Cuomo. Pearlman was previously chief of staff and Counsel to the Lieutenant Governor. Prior to this, Jeff served as chief of staff to the New York State Senate Democratic Conference. Also, Jeff was formerly Of Counsel to the law firm Greenberg Traurig, where his field of practice included Government Affairs and litigation, specializing in Ethics, Freedom of Information Law, Election Law and other client related matters. Pearlman also was an Assistant Counsel to Governor David Paterson of New York. He resides in Albany, New York.

== Education and early career ==
A 1989 graduate of SUNY New Paltz, Pearlman also graduated from Albany Law School in 2000. He served as a staff person in the New York State Assembly and New York State Senate from 1987 through 2006. During this time, he worked for member of the assembly Ivan Lafayette, and state senators Martin Connor, David Paterson, Jeremy Weinstein, Liz Krueger, Donald Halperin, and Manfred Ohrenstein. Pearlman also served as a judicial intern to New York Supreme Court Justice Louis Benza.

Pearlman was visiting clinical professor of law and director of the Low Income Taxpayer Clinic at Albany Law School until his appointment as assistant counsel to Governor Paterson in May 2008. He was interviewed by The Business Review for his work with the clinic. He currently serves as an adjunct professor at Albany Law School and The University at Albany, teaching Government Ethics.

He served as a vice president of the New York Democratic Lawyers Council. In 2004 and 2006 he represented State Senator Andrea Stewart-Cousins in her bid to unseat State Senator Nicholas Spano. He prepared and organized a ballot protection effort that uncovered attempts by the opposition to suppress the vote on Election Day. In 2006, 2009 and 2010, he successfully represented the Democratic Party in its election law challenges to designating petitions. He has also served as a member of the Albany County, New York Democratic Committee.

== Assistant Counsel to Governor Paterson ==
On December 31, 2006, then Lieutenant Governor-elect David Paterson appointed as his counsel. In March 2008, after Paterson became governor, Pearlman was appointed Assistant Counsel to the Governor, Ethics Officer for the Executive Chamber and Records Access Officer, in charge of all Freedom of Information Act requests for the executive chamber.

== Special Counsel to Governor Hochul ==
On August 24, 2021, Kathy Hochul assumed the Governorship of New York. Hochul brought on Pearlman to serve as her special counsel. Pearlman served in this year for one year before returning to the Authorities Budget Office. Pearlman had previously served as her chief of staff when Hochul was lieutenant governor.

== Court of Claims ==
On June 3, 2024, Kathy Hochul nominated Pearlman to sit on the Court of Claims. The NYS Senate confirmed him on June 5, 2024.

He was also appointed an acting Justice on New York's trial court. His decision to declare the district's lines unconstitutional, in January 2026, was upheld by the intermediate appeals court in February 2026. On March 3, the Supreme Court of the United States issued a stay, in effect stopping the lawsuit.

== See also ==
- Charles J. O'Byrne, former Secretary to the Governor
- Christopher O. Ward
- New York State Authorities Budget Office
