= Nan Hayworth =

American politician (born 1959)

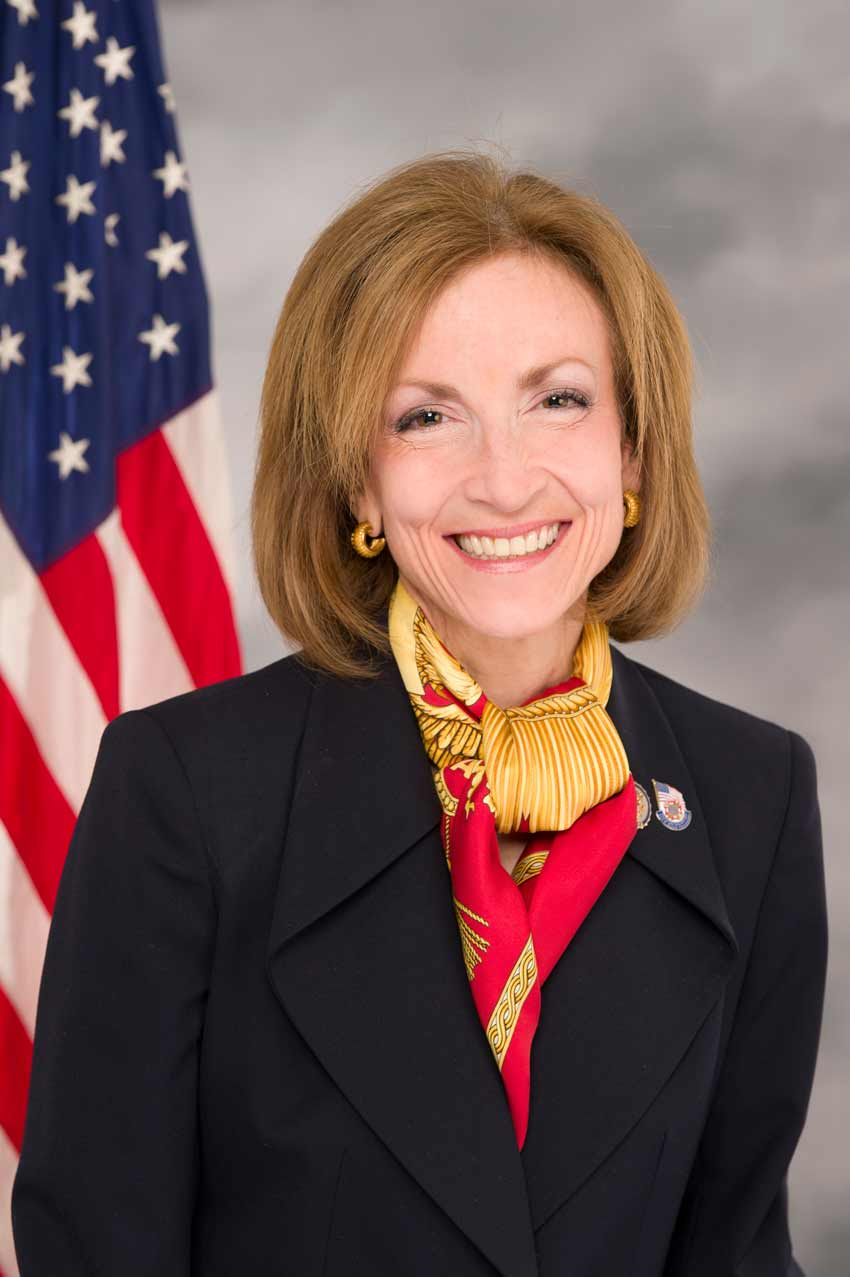

Member of the U.S. House of Representatives from New York's 19th district
- In office January 3, 2011 – January 3, 2013
- Preceded by: John Hall
- Succeeded by: Sean Patrick Maloney (redistricted)

Personal details
- Born: Nan Alison Sutter; December 14, 1959 (age 66) Chicago, Illinois, U.S.
- Party: Republican
- Spouse: Scott Hayworth
- Children: 2
- Education: Princeton University (AB); Cornell University (MD)

Nan Alison Hayworth (née Sutter; born December 14, 1959) is an American ophthalmologist and former congresswoman for New York's 19th congressional district. A Republican, she was elected in 2010.

In 2012, after redistricting, Hayworth ran for reelection in the new 18th district. She lost to Democrat and former Clinton White House staff secretary Sean Patrick Maloney that year and again in a 2014 rematch.

== Early life, education, and medical career ==
Nan Alison Sutter was born on December 14, 1959, in Chicago and was raised in Munster, Indiana, to parents who were both World War II veterans. Her mother Sarah Margaret Badley immigrated to the United States from England in 1948. A graduate of Munster High School, she went on to graduate from Princeton University with an A.B. in biology in 1981 after completing a 53-page long senior thesis titled "Studies of the Interphase Development of Dictyostelium Discoideum on Gradients of Cyclic 3':5' - Adenosine Monophosphate in Agar." She then studied at Cornell University Medical College, after which she trained in ophthalmology at Mount Sinai Hospital, New York. She first worked in a solo practice and in 1996 joined the Mount Kisco Medical Group.

== U.S. House of Representatives ==
=== Elections ===
2010

On September 14, 2010, Hayworth defeated Neil DiCarlo in the Republican primary, with 69% of the vote. She defeated Democratic incumbent, John Hall, with 53% of the vote in the 2010 general election.

Hayworth was one of 41 Republican physicians who ran for Congress in 2010. During the campaign, she posted her medical diploma on her website. She was the only female physician in Congress. She was a member of the GOP Young Guns and the GOP's Republican Main Street Partnership. She was a member of the LGBT Equality Caucus.

District 19 (2002–2010) had a Cook Partisan Voting Index of R+3. President George W. Bush carried this district with 54% in 2004 and President Barack Obama carried it with 51% in 2008. The district lay north of New York City and was composed of parts of Dutchess, Orange, Rockland, Westchester and Putnam Counties. District 18 (2012–present) is composed of all of Orange and Putnam Counties, as well as parts of Dutchess and Westchester Counties.

2012

As part of redistricting after the 2010 census, Hayworth's district was renumbered as the 18th District. In terms of voter population, the new district is composed of the old 18th District (1%); the old 19th (76%); the old 20th (2%); and the old 22nd (21%). She lost the election to Sean Patrick Maloney, former White House Staff Secretary to President Bill Clinton, 52%–48%.

2014

Hayworth filed papers with the FEC to lay the groundwork for a 2014 campaign against Maloney and suggested in media reports that she was strongly considering running. The race was one of the most competitive in New York. Late in the campaign, Hayworth released a campaign advertisement featuring her gay son, who told voters that his mother was "not an extremist." The ad drew criticism from LGBT groups, who said that Hayworth did not do enough to support pro-LGBT legislation while in office. Maloney, who was on the ballots of the Democratic and Working Families parties, won the election by a plurality with a 47.66% to 45.88% split. Hayworth had won the primary nominations of the Republican, Conservative, and Independence parties.

=== Tenure ===
During her time in Congress, Hayworth focused on fiscal issues, while avoiding divisive stances on issues such as abortion and same-sex marriage. She endorsed Mitt Romney in November 2011. She supported repeal of the Patient Protection and Affordable Care Act, and generally opposed additional gun control measures.

==== Hurricane Irene ====
Following Hurricane Irene in 2011, Hayworth made the following statement after touring her district: "I've written to the President to support Governor Cuomo's request for the farthest-reaching disaster declaration for the counties, to ensure that residents are eligible for individual assistance and municipalities are eligible for public assistance programs." She added that any additions to the disaster relief fund must be offset by federal budget cuts elsewhere.

Hayworth voted for Paul Ryan's budget in 2011 and 2012. During an interview on Early Start on CNN, she reiterated her support for Ryan, calling him a "teacher and mentor" for the House Republicans when it comes to "a budget plan that actually will work for the United States." In 2011, she was one of several House Republicans who sent a letter to President Obama urging him to expedite the permitting process for safe offshore energy exploration.

The majority of Hayworth's votes were related to budget, spending and tax issues. Some bills that passed in the House that Hayworth voted for include the Budget Control Act of 2011 and the Cut, Cap and Balance Act of 2011. Hayworth voted against the motion to increase the debt limit. On January 1, 2013, she voted in favor of the final bill preventing the Fiscal Cliff.

==== Fundraising ====
Hayworth had a debt totaling half a million dollars following her campaign. The top industries that contributed to Hayworth's campaign included health professionals, securities and investment, and health services companies. Her top contributors were Mount Kisco Medical Group, Vestar Capital Partners, and Elliott Management.

=== Committee assignments ===
- Committee on Financial Services
  - Subcommittee on Capital Markets and Government-Sponsored Enterprises
  - Subcommittee on Domestic Monetary Policy and Technology
  - Subcommittee on Oversight and Investigations

== Personal life ==
She met her husband, Scott Hayworth, at Princeton University. He is the president and CEO of Mount Kisco Medical Group, associate dean at the Icahn School of Medicine at Mount Sinai, and the former chair of the board of directors for the American Medical Group Association. They married in 1981 and have two sons. She is a member of the Lutheran Church – Missouri Synod, and is on the board of 501(c)4 political action committee ConservAmerica.

On November 23, 2021, Hayworth announced on Twitter that her son John had died.

== See also ==
- Women in the United States House of Representatives

U.S. House of Representatives
Preceded by John Hall	Member of the U.S. House of Representatives from New York's 19th congressional district 2011–2013	Succeeded by Chris Gibson
U.S. order of precedence (ceremonial)
Preceded by Ann Marie Buerkle as Former U.S. Representative	Order of precedence of the United States as Former U.S. Representative	Succeeded by John Faso as Former U.S. Representative
