= Randy Florke =

American real estate, design executive (born 1962)

- Born: December 17, 1962 (age 63); Iowa, U.S.
- Occupations: Real estate and design executive
- Spouse: Sean Patrick Maloney (m. 2014)
- Children: 3

Randy Florke (born December 19, 1962) is an American real estate and design executive specializing in country style. He is the owner of a real estate business, The Rural Connection, based in Sullivan County, New York and has written books on interior design.

== Early life and career ==
Florke was born on a farm in Iowa to a family of German descent. He graduated from Washington High School in 1981. Florke moved to New York City at the age of eighteen to model and enroll in a fashion course. He later started a real estate business, The Rural Connection, which sells homes in Sullivan County, New York. Florke has written articles for Country Living. He has authored books on interior design.

A spring 2007 profile in O, The Oprah Magazine reported that Florke, a decorator and author, manages six houses and owned a brokerage business and construction company. Florke starred in an A&E reality show about his real estate business.

== Personal life ==
Florke has been with his husband Sean Patrick Maloney since 1992, when they met in New York City, where Maloney was helping plan the Democratic National Convention. They have adopted three children and live in Cold Spring, New York. Florke and Maloney became engaged on December 25, 2013. They married in Cold Spring on June 21, 2014.

== Selected works ==
- Florke, Randy; Becker, Nancy Jane (2005). Country Living Your House, Your Home: Randy Florke's Decorating Essentials. Hearst Books. ISBN 978-1-58816-411-7.
- Florke, Randy; Becker, Nancy Jane (2010). Restore. Recycle. Repurpose: Create a Beautiful Home. Hearst Books. ISBN 978-1-58816-769-9.
- Florke, Randy; Becker, Nancy J. (2012). Country Living Simple Sustainable Style: Ways to Make a House Your Home. Hearst Books. ISBN 978-1-61837-052-5.
