= Nancy G. Groenwegen =

American politician (born 1957)

Nancy Gleason Groenwegen (1957 - ) is the former General Counsel for the Office of the New York State Comptroller. She was appointed General Counsel on December 21, 2010 by New York State Comptroller Thomas P. DiNapoli. Groenwegen led a staff of 40 lawyers, and her responsibilities included oversight of the comptroller's investigations and ethics compliance units. She has since retired.

Groenwegen was formally the head of the New York Department of Civil Service and served as President of the Civil Service Commission. She was appointed by Governor of New York Eliot Spitzer in 2007. The three-member commission, examines and creates rules governing a state civil service matters, including testing, disciplinary actions, and pay grades. As commissioner of the civil service department, she oversaw the department that manages human resources for executive branches of the state of New York for over 170,000 employees, and provides support to county and local civil service agencies.

Groewegen was previously the Assistant Attorney General of New York from 2001 to 2006. She received a B.A. from SUNY Albany and her J.D. from Boston University.

Nancy married Paul Groenwegen in 1988. They have one son, Philip, born in 1995.
