= Patrick Hooker =

American politician

Patrick M. Hooker was the Commissioner of Agriculture and Markets for the state of New York. He was nominated by former Governor of New York Eliot Spitzer in January 2007.

Prior to being appointed, Hooker served as the Director of the Public Policy Division at the New York Farm Bureau. Hooker was previously the Deputy Director of Governmental Relations at the New York Farm Bureau from 1990 to 1999. From 1987 to 1990, he served as Director of the New York State Senate Agriculture Committee. He was also a Rural Affairs Advisor to the New York State Assembly in the Office of the Minority Leader from 1985 to 1987. Mr. Hooker received his B.S. from Cornell University and his A.A.S. from the State University of New York at Morrisville.
