= Eliot Spitzer political surveillance controversy =

Allegations made in 2007 regarding New York Governor Eliot Spitzer

The Eliot Spitzer political surveillance controversy (also known as Troopergate) broke out on July 23, 2007 when New York State Attorney General Andrew Cuomo's office admonished Governor of New York Eliot Spitzer's administration for ordering the State Police to create special records of Senate majority leader Joseph Bruno's whereabouts when he traveled with police escorts in New York City.

Investigations of the event, dubbed Troopergate by media outlets, were not affected by Spitzer's resignation. As of March 2008, four probes by the state Attorney General's office, the State Senate Investigations Committee, the Albany County District Attorney's office, and the Spitzer-appointed state ethics board, the New York Commission on Public Integrity, were ongoing.

== Creation of documents ==
At the direction of top officials of the Spitzer administration, the New York State Police created documents meant to cause political damage to Bruno. The governor's staff had stated they were responding to a Freedom of Information request from the Albany Times Union in late June. On May 23, Spitzer's Communications Director Darren Dopp wrote an e-mail to Rich Baum, a senior Spitzer adviser, stating that "records exist going way back" about Bruno's use of state aircraft, and that "also, I think there is a new and different way to proceed re media. Will explain tomorrow." Dopp later wrote another e-mail to Baum after a story ran in the Times Union about a federal grand jury investigation of Bruno's investments in thoroughbred racing horses, and wrote: "Think travel story would fit nicely in the mix." The first Freedom of Information Act request about Bruno's travel was filed by the Times Union on June 27.

== Attorney General's report ==
A lengthy report issued by the Attorney General's office concluded that Spitzer engaged in creating media coverage concerning Senator Bruno's travel before any Freedom of Information Law request was made. The investigation looked into both Bruno's travel and the Senate leader's allegation that Spitzer used State Police to spy on him. Cuomo concluded that "These e-mails show that persons in the governor's office did not merely produce records under a FOIL request, but were instead engaged in planning and producing media coverage concerning Senator Bruno's travel on state aircraft before any FOIL request was made." It noted that the Times Union's initial FOIL request did not even ask for the records involving Bruno that the paper was later given by aides to Spitzer. It also suggests that the governor's staff lied when they tried to explain what they had done and forced the State Police to go far beyond their normal procedures in documenting Mr. Bruno's whereabouts.

The Times Union's requests sought documents on use of state aircraft by seven officials, including Spitzer, Bruno and Lieutenant Governor David Paterson, yet Spitzer's office released only Bruno's itinerary. The Spitzer administration and the State Police provided far more details about Bruno than about other officials to the Times Union, including records to reply to a request under the state's Freedom of information laws, though no such request had even been made. The report noted that the state acted outside the laws in what it released, such as documents that resembled official state travel records, "which they were not" according to Ellen Nachtigall Biben, a former prosecutor in the Manhattan District Attorney's office, who contributed to the report. The report stated that the Times Union request came after the story about Bruno's travels was published, and was "not consistent" with Spitzer administration claims that all it did was respond to a FOIL request. No other officials were subject to the same scrutiny as Bruno, and in some cases, the reports created by State Police were pieced together long after the trips, based sometimes on the memory of the police escorts involved.

The report cleared Bruno of any misuse of the state's air fleet, which had been alleged. Spitzer also used the state aircraft during the first six months of his term as governor for political purposes, including a stop in Rochester to attend an event for the Monroe County Democratic Committee on a day in which he had a number of stops related to public business. The report criticized Spitzer's office for using State Police resources to gather information about Bruno's travel and releasing the information to the media. New York Republican State Committee Chairman Joseph Mondello claimed that "Today's explosive report by Attorney General Andrew Cuomo validates the frightening charges that Governor Spitzer's administration abused the New York State Police and New York's FOIL laws in an attempt to set up Senate Majority Leader Joseph Bruno" and that "This disturbing abuse of power by a Governor is unprecedented." The findings of the report were endorsed by Mr. Spitzer's own Inspector General, Kristine Hamann.

== Governor's response ==
Spitzer responded at a July 23 press conference that "As governor, I am accountable for what goes on in the executive branch and I accept responsibility for the actions of my office" and that his administration had "grossly mishandled" the situation. The Governor issued an apology to Senator Bruno and stated that "I apologized to Senator Bruno and I did so personally this morning." He added "In addition, I apologized to the men and women of the State Police, and to acting Superintendent Preston Felton personally for allowing this esteemed institution to be drawn into this matter." Felton said he did not realize he was part of a political scheme, and claimed in a written statement that "I have never, in my 26-year career with the state police, knowingly undertaken any such action and never would," and that "To the extent that circumstances previously not known to me have now given rise to that appearance, I am particularly saddened."

Spitzer subsequently announced that he would indefinitely suspend his communications director, Darren Dopp, and reassign another top official. When questioned about his promise to bring a new dawn of ethical responsibility to state politics, Spitzer responded by saying "I will not tolerate this behavior", "ethics and accountability must and will remain rigorous in my administration," and that "I have always stated that I want ethics and integrity to be the hallmarks of my administration. That is why I requested that the State Inspector General review the allegations with respect to my office, and that is why we have fully cooperated with both inquiries." As of July 2007, Cuomo's office was considering recommending disciplinary action against the Governor's office.

== Reaction ==
On July 27, 2007, the New York Post reported on Dopp's past interactions with the press on behalf of Spitzer. Reporter Charles Gasparino claimed that he was threatened by Dopp while covering then Attorney General Spitzer's investigation of the over-compensation of former New York Stock Exchange Chairman Richard Grasso. Gasparino feels he was targeted by Dopp after publishing a piece claiming that Attorney General's office did not also pursue Spitzer ally H. Carl McCall who, as the compensation-committee chief, guided the board when it approved Grasso's compensation package. The New York State Supreme Court summarily ordered Grasso to repay a significant amount of the $188M package.

Republican State Senator Dean Skelos asked, "Did the governor know?" and stated that the report "leaves many questions open in terms of how far up the chain of command were the acts of — at least the acts of Dopp and Howard — known?". Mr. Skelos added that he believed it would be "totally appropriate" for the Senate Committee on Investigations and Government Operations, which has subpoena power and of which Skelos is a member, to review the matter. Skelos called the matter "the makings of a real conspiracy here", and was echoed by Assemblyman Keith Wright, a Harlem Democrat who said the findings of the report sound "very Nixonian." Douglas Muzzio, a Baruch College political scientist, commented that "The Watergate analogy is inescapable." Republican George Winner, Chairman of the Senate Investigations Committee, stated that the governor was "stonewalling" and remarked that it "Sounds like he didn't learn too much from Nixon, that the cover-up is worse than the crime." Assembly Speaker Sheldon Silver, the Legislature's top Democrat, called what was done to Mr. Bruno "horrendous", and added "The real question here is how much did the governor know and when did he know it."

Skelos noted Cuomo's investigators never questioned Spitzer or a top aide mentioned in the report, Secretary to the Governor Rich Baum, who received e-mails related to the plot. Cuomo spokesman Jeffrey Lerner said Spitzer's counsel provided the e-mails and that Baum and Dopp refused requests to be interviewed, opting instead to provide sworn written statements. He added that speaking to Spitzer would be unnecessary because there was little evidence of criminal or improper activity. Democrat Amy Paulin, an Assemblywoman, acknowledged that "The general public wants to know who knew what when," noting that "Until we put this behind us, there will be a credibility gap." Assemblyman William Parment, also a Democrat, added that "Coming clean would be the best thing to do."

Spitzer defended the decision not to provide testimony, saying that it was not necessary for Baum and Dopp to be questioned after Cuomo determined no crime was committed. The attorney general's office said investigators rejected the sworn statements of Dopp and Baum since both men refused to testify, and some observers have noted this has left several questions unanswered. These omissions have prompted speculation that the governor may have been involved in some way. Jeffrey Lerner, a spokesman for the Attorney General, stated that "We told the Governor's Counsel's office that we wanted to interview Darren Dopp and Richard Baum. The Governor's Counsel's office declined and instead sent sworn written statements. We had no power to compel testimony," and that "our investigators decided not (to) include the written statements as they did not have the chance to interview Dopp and Baum." The Governor said that the written statements by Baum and Dopp were "sufficient for the attorney general to close its investigation," and reiterated that he was not involved in the decision to not have Baum and Dopp testify before Cuomo. Still, their sworn statements were not accepted for use in the report.

== Senate investigation ==
Both the state Ethics Commission and the Senate investigations committee have announced they have requested all interview transcripts, notes, e-mail and other material from Attorney General Andrew Cuomo's investigation and would review the matter. The Governor said he would allow both senior aides to testify, and testify himself if subpoenaed by the State Ethics Commission. When asked about the possibility, Spitzer said "that might happen. I don't know what path to take," and that "if there are investigations, we cooperate with investigations. I'm not sure where this will go." The State Assembly is not expected to conduct its own inquire or participate in any joint legislative investigation, after Speaker Silver stated that "I have no need to hold any hearings to go further," and that "We heard from the top law enforcement officer in the state, Andrew Cuomo. A lot of misjudgments were made, but there was no criminality."

State Senate Majority Leader Bruno did not rule out using subpoena powers to get under oath Spitzer's statements on the matter, telling reporters that the facts will "speak for themselves as they unfold." While some have questioned the Senate's motives and constitutional authority to conduct an investigation, Assembly Democrat Richard Brodsky explained that the Governor's office may not be able to claim executive privilege to resist an investigation, stating "Assertions of executive privilege have usually not been upheld under New York law and in the most recent litigation, which I conducted, the governor's office appeared asserting executive privilege and was unsuccessful," in reference to a 2004 case in which a State Supreme Court judge rejected Governor George Pataki's claim of executive privilege, saying the governor's staff could not withhold documents from a legislative committee seeking information about a controversial contract to develop property along the Erie Canal. Bruno concluded that "What I want is the truth, and there are others that are third parties who are going to be objective, pragmatic. All we want is the truth. And people will, once they know the truth, then we'll know what the guilt is on the part of whoever's been involved."

== Albany County District Attorney investigation ==
On August 1, 2007, Albany County District Attorney P. David Soares announced that his office would start investigations of possible wrongdoing by the Spitzer administration. That investigation concluded September 20, finding "no illegal conduct. To the contrary, we found that the governor, his staff and the New York State Police were acting within their authority in compiling and releasing documents to the media concerning the use of state aircraft." The New York Times reported that "Republicans questioned Mr. Soares's approach, particularly conducting the interviews without putting the subjects under oath and without issuing subpoenas", but that Soares, while a Democrat, "has shown a willingness to prosecute corruption cases aggressively against fellow party members." Then on November 12, the New York Post alleged that various Spitzer aides had been directed to lie to investigators by their superiors. On December 17, 2007, Spitzer's office acknowledged it had received additional subpoenas, in a second investigation by the Albany D.A.'s office.

On March 29, 2008, The Buffalo News reported that "former Gov. Eliot L. Spitzer lied to prosecutors" about his role in Troopergate but "the Albany County district attorney said he will not pursue any criminal charges against the already-disgraced ex-governor."
