= Charles J. O'Byrne =

American lawyer

Secretary to the Governor of New York
- In office March 17, 2008 – October 24, 2008
- Preceded by: Rich Baum
- Succeeded by: William J. Cunningham III

Personal details
- Born: 1959 (age 66–67) Manhattan, New York
- Party: Democratic
- Education: Columbia University (B.A. '81); Columbia Law School (J.D. '84); Weston School of Theology (M.Div. '96, S.T.L. '96)
- Occupation: Lawyer

Charles J. O'Byrne (born 1959) is an American lawyer, former Jesuit priest, and former political staffer to Governor of New York David Paterson. O'Byrne served as Secretary to the Governor—the highest unelected position in New York government—during the Paterson administration. He stepped down from that position in October 2008 after admitting to having failed to pay five years' worth of taxes.

O'Byrne previously served as Chief of Staff to Paterson when Paterson served as a member of the New York State Senate and as Lieutenant Governor of New York. He also worked as a speechwriter for Howard Dean's 2004 presidential campaign. Prior to entering politics, O'Byrne practiced law and was a member of the Society of Jesus for 12 years before departing his order and authoring a controversial 2002 article about Catholic priests and seminarians.

== Early life, education, and early career ==
O'Byrne was born into an Irish Catholic family in New York City. His father was a teacher and then a principal in New York public schools, and his mother was a psychologist. O'Byrne graduated from Red Bank Catholic High School in New Jersey in 1977.

O'Byrne attended Columbia University and graduated summa cum laude in 1981, majoring in history with a concentration in the Medieval and Renaissance periods. During college, he took a summer job in the New Jersey Attorney General's office, and at 22, became acting superintendent of elections and acting commissioner of registration in Monmouth County. He went on to Columbia Law School, graduating with a J.D. in 1984. At Columbia, O'Byrne became close friends with Stephen Smith Jr., a member of the Kennedy family. After law school, he worked as a corporate litigator at the Manhattan office of Rosenman & Colin LLP.

== Priesthood ==
O'Byrne left corporate law for a vocation to the priesthood in 1989 and attended Saint John Neumann Residence and Hall, a preparatory school for seminarians under the Archdiocese of New York. O'Byrne was later admitted into Saint Andrew Hall, the Jesuit Novitiate in Syracuse for his primary formation as a Jesuit. He professed his vows as a Jesuit at the LeMoyne College Chapel in Syracuse, New York in 1991 and completed his philosophy studies at Loyola University Chicago. O'Byrne went on to seminary at Weston Jesuit School of Theology in Cambridge, Massachusetts in 1994 and received two master's degrees. During his studies in Cambridge, he acted as Harvard Law School's chaplain and worked as a teaching fellow at Harvard University with Robert Coles, the Pulitzer-prize winning author. In 1996, O'Byrne was ordained as a priest. He received a voluntary Decree of Dismissal from the Society of Jesus in 2002 when his superiors determined that he no longer wished to remain in the Order.

A friend of the Kennedy family, O'Byrne acted as a spiritual adviser during the 1991 rape trial of Stephen Smith's brother, William Kennedy Smith, and officiated at the marriage of John F. Kennedy Jr. and Carolyn Bessette in 1996. In 1999, he presided over the funeral of Kennedy and Bessette in New York City after they died in a plane crash. As of 2008, he was a trustee of the Jean K. Smith Trust, the Kennedy Smith Foundation and the Smith Family Trust. In a 2006 financial disclosure, he listed gifts in excess of $1,000 and trustee commissions from members of the Smith family.

=== Aftermath ===
O'Byrne authored "Sex & Sexuality: One Man's Story About Religious Life and What Seminaries Really Teach About Sex", a controversial September 2002 article in Playboy magazine that alleged hypocrisy and sexual dysfunction in the Catholic Church. The article caused some controversy, portraying O'Byrne's fellow seminarians as men who entered the religious life with "little or no sexual experience" who made up for lost time. O'Byrne asserted that there was "sex all around me, including relationships between Jesuits." He also asserted that there was a prevalence of priests who held an unnatural interest in young male parishioners.

O'Byrne, who after his dismissal from the Jesuits came out as gay, later left the Catholic Church and became a practicing Episcopalian.

== Political career ==
In 2003, O'Byrne joined Howard Dean's presidential campaign as Policy Director for New York, and was then hired as a speechwriter. After Dean dropped out of the race, O'Byrne went to work for State Senate Minority Leader David Paterson as a speechwriter and policy analyst. In 2006, O'Byrne became Paterson's Chief of Staff.

O'Byrne maintained his position as Chief of Staff when Paterson was elected Lieutenant Governor of New York, and was elevated to Secretary to the Governor (the functional equivalent of a Chief of Staff) when Paterson was sworn in as Governor in March 2008 following the resignation of Eliot Spitzer. O'Byrne was variously described as Paterson's "quarterback", "gatekeeper", "alter ego", "confidant", and "enforcer", and as "the glue that held the administration together". O'Byrne was responsible for hiring Christopher O. Ward as executive director of the Port Authority of New York and New Jersey.

On October 24, 2008, O'Byrne resigned from his post following the revelation that he owed nearly $300,000 in back taxes. O'Byrne admitted to having failed to pay taxes for five years. After O'Byrne's unpaid taxes became public knowledge, he contended that his failure to pay was caused by depression. In an interview, O'Byrne's psychiatrist, Dr. Howard Kremen, said he had treated O'Byrne for depression from 2001 through 2006 and said he attributed Mr. O'Byrne's tax problems to his condition.

== Later career ==
O'Byrne serves as Executive Vice President for Policy at Related Cos, where he focuses on government relations with Washington DC, Albany, and City Hall.

O'Byrne is also known as an advocate for LGBTQ+ advancement in New York. In 2021, he was ranked #39 on the City&State of NY’s "Pride Power 50," and was listed among Politics NY’s "LGBTQ+ Power Players of 2023."

Preceded by Rich Baum	New York State Secretary to the Governor; 2008	Succeeded by William J. Cunningham III
