= David Paterson =

Governor of New York from 2008 to 2010

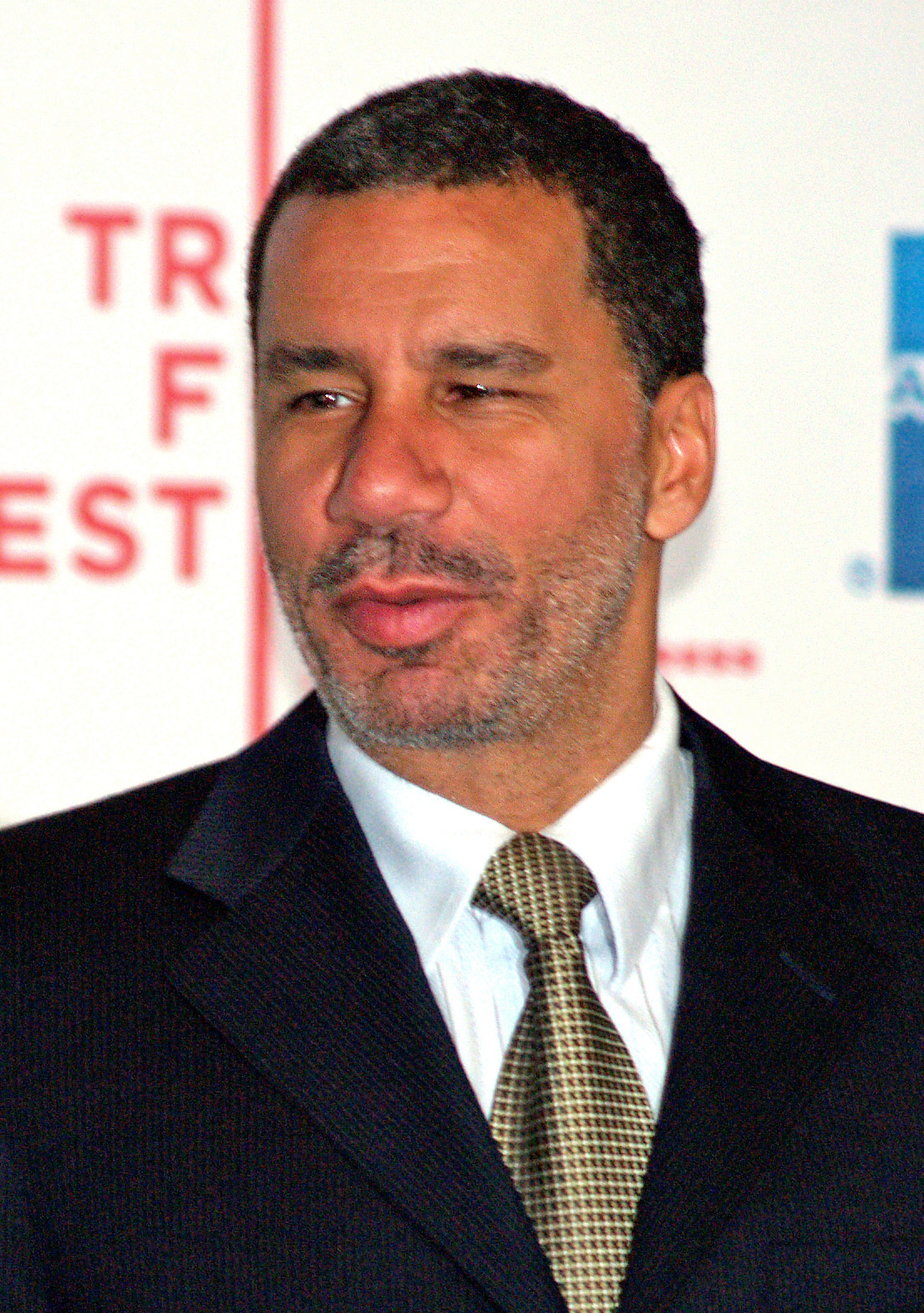
- Paterson at the 2008 Tribeca Film Festival

Chair of the New York Democratic Party
- In office May 21, 2014 – November 4, 2015
- Preceded by: Keith L. T. Wright
- Succeeded by: Sheila Comar

55th Governor of New York
- In office March 17, 2008 – December 31, 2010
- Lieutenant: Joseph Bruno (acting); Dean Skelos (acting); Malcolm Smith (acting); Pedro Espada Jr. (acting); Richard Ravitch
- Preceded by: Eliot Spitzer
- Succeeded by: Andrew Cuomo

Lieutenant Governor of New York
- In office January 1, 2007 – March 17, 2008
- Governor: Eliot Spitzer
- Preceded by: Mary Donohue
- Succeeded by: Joseph Bruno (acting)

Minority Leader of the New York State Senate
- In office January 1, 2003 – December 31, 2006
- Preceded by: Martin Connor
- Succeeded by: Malcolm Smith

Member of the New York State Senate
- In office December 10, 1985 – December 31, 2006
- Preceded by: Leon Bogues
- Succeeded by: Bill Perkins
- Constituency: 29th district (1985–2002); 30th district (2003–2006)

Personal details
- Born: David Alexander Paterson; May 20, 1954 (age 72) New York City, New York, U.S.
- Party: Democratic
- Spouses: Michelle Paige (m. 1993; div. 2014); Mary Galda (m. 2019)
- Children: 2
- Parent: Basil Paterson
- Education: Columbia University (BA); Hofstra University (JD)
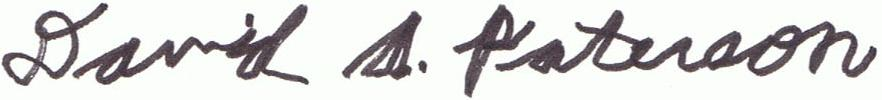
- Signature

David Alexander Paterson (born May 20, 1954) is an American attorney and politician who served as the 55th governor of New York, succeeding Eliot Spitzer, who resigned, and serving out nearly three years of Spitzer's term from March 2008 to December 2010. A member of the Democratic Party, he was the first legally blind person to be sworn in as governor of a U.S. state, and the first African-American governor of New York.

Following his graduation from Hofstra Law School, Paterson worked in the District Attorney's office of Queens County, New York, and on the staff of Manhattan borough president David Dinkins. In 1985, he was elected to the New York State Senate to a seat once held by his father, former New York Secretary of State Basil Paterson. In 2003, he rose to the position of Senate minority leader. Paterson was selected to be the running mate of Democratic gubernatorial nominee Eliot Spitzer in the 2006 New York gubernatorial election. Spitzer and Paterson were elected with 65% of the vote, and Paterson took office as lieutenant governor on January 1, 2007.

After Spitzer resigned in the wake of a prostitution scandal, Paterson was sworn in as governor of New York state on March 17, 2008. Paterson held the office of governor during the Great Recession, and he implemented state budget cuts. He also made two significant appointments: In January 2009, he appointed then-U.S. representative Kirsten Gillibrand to a vacant U.S. Senate seat (a position she has held since), and, in July 2009, he appointed Richard Ravitch as lieutenant governor. Paterson launched a campaign for a full term as governor in the 2010 New York gubernatorial election, but he announced on February 26, 2010, that he would bow out of the race. During the final year of his administration, Paterson faced allegations of soliciting improper gifts and making false statements; he was eventually fined in excess of $62,000 for accepting free New York Yankees tickets. He was not charged with perjury.

Since leaving office, Paterson has been a radio talk show host and chairman of the New York Democratic Party from May 2014 to November 2015. In late 2020, he published his first book, entitled Black, Blind, & in Charge: A Story of Visionary Leadership and Overcoming Adversity.

== Early life and education ==
Paterson was born in Brooklyn, New York, to Portia Hairston Paterson, a homemaker, and Basil Paterson, a labor law attorney. Basil Paterson was later a New York state senator for Harlem, secretary of state under Hugh Carey, and deputy mayor of New York City for Ed Koch. According to a New York Now interview, Paterson traces his roots on his mother's side of the family to pre–Civil War African American slaves in the states of North Carolina and South Carolina. His paternal grandmother Evangeline Rondon Paterson, a Jamaican, was secretary to Black Nationalist leader Marcus Garvey. His paternal grandfather was Leonard James Paterson, a native of Carriacou who arrived in the United States aboard the S.S. Vestris on May 16, 1917. It was reported by The Genetic Genealogist in March 2008 that Paterson had recently undergone genetic genealogy testing. Part of his father's ancestry consists of immigrants from England, Ireland, and Scotland, while his mother's side includes Eastern European Jewish ancestry, as well as ancestors from the Guinea-Bissau region of West Africa.

At the age of three months, Paterson contracted an ear infection that spread to his optic nerve, leaving him sightless in his left eye and with severely limited vision in his right. Since New York City public schools would not guarantee him an education without placing him in special education classes, his family bought a home in the Long Island suburb of South Hempstead so that he could attend mainstream classes there. Paterson was the first student with a disability in the Hempstead public schools, graduating from Hempstead High School in 1971.

Paterson earned a Bachelor of Arts in history from Columbia College of Columbia University in 1977 and a Juris Doctor from Hofstra Law School in 1983. After law school, he went to work for the Queens District Attorney's Office, but he did not pass the New York bar examination, which prevented him from becoming an attorney at law. He claimed that his failing the New York bar was partially the result of insufficient accommodation for his visual impairment, and has since advocated for changes in bar exam procedures.

== New York State Senate (1985–2006) ==
On August 6, 1985, state senator Leon Bogues died, and Paterson obtained the Democratic party nomination for the seat. In mid-September, a meeting of 648 Democratic committee members on the first ballot gave Paterson 58% of the vote, giving him the party nomination. That October, Paterson won the virtually uncontested special State Senate election. At the time, the 29th Senate district covered the Manhattan neighborhoods of Harlem, Manhattan Valley, and the Upper West Side, the same district that Paterson's father had represented. He was re-elected ten times, and remained in the state senate until 2006, sitting in the 186th, 187th, 188th, 189th, 190th, 191st, 192nd, 193rd, 194th, 195th, and 196th New York State Legislatures.

Paterson briefly ran in the Democratic primary for the office of New York City Public Advocate in 1993, but he was defeated by Mark Green.

=== Senate minority leader (2003–2006) ===
Paterson was elected Minority Leader by the Senate Democratic Conference on November 20, 2002, becoming both the first non-white state legislative leader and the highest-ranking black elected official in the history of New York. Paterson unseated the incumbent minority leader, Martin Connor. Paterson became known for his consensus-building style and sharp political skills.

Describing Paterson's tenure in the Senate, The New York Times cited his "wit, flurries of reform proposals and unusual bursts of candor".

== 2006 gubernatorial election ==
In 2006, Paterson was selected by New York attorney general and Democratic gubernatorial candidate Eliot Spitzer as his running mate. The news stunned the New York political world, as the Democratic minority was poised to possibly take over the state legislature. Paterson traded the possibility of becoming Senate majority leader for the opportunity to hold the largely ceremonial lieutenant governor post. During their 2006 campaign, Paterson resolved a dispute with Spitzer over turf wars between staff members. The Spitzer–Paterson ticket won a landslide victory in the election, with 65.7% of the vote. It was the largest margin of victory in a gubernatorial race in New York history, and the second-largest for any statewide race in New York history.

In late December 2006, shortly before being sworn in as lieutenant governor, Paterson said that, if he ever succeeded Spitzer as governor, he and Nelson A. Rockefeller would have something besides the governorship in common: great difficulty in reading. Rockefeller was dyslexic, and Paterson compared this to his own blindness.

== Lieutenant Governor of New York (2007–2008) ==
Paterson took office as lieutenant governor on January 1, 2007.

=== Stem-cell research ===
Paterson led Spitzer's successful 2007 legislative effort to approve a bond issue to provide at least $1 billion toward stem-cell research. Spitzer and Paterson touted the measure partly for its economic development benefits, following California's $3 billion effort, which in turn had been prompted by the U.S. federal government halting funding for such research.

=== Voting rights ===
In September 2007, Paterson weighed in on a proposal before the New York City Council to extend voting rights to noncitizens. He told a crowd gathered at the West Indian American Day Carnival Parade that he believed noncitizens should be granted voting rights. He stressed that he was asking for a change in policy, rather than a new law, citing that, although 22 states and territories between 1776 and 1920 allowed the practice, none do now. Spitzer issued a statement expressing that he did not agree with Paterson's position, and he said that he was unaware that Paterson would be speaking on the matter. Paterson had tried to introduce legislation granting voting rights to noncitizens as a State Senator fifteen years earlier.

=== Racial discrimination lawsuit ===
In February 2008, a U.S. District Judge denied a motion to dismiss a racial-discrimination lawsuit naming Paterson. A white photographer claimed he was fired by Paterson due to his race. The lawsuit was settled in 2009 for $300,000.

== Governor of New York (2008–2010) ==
In the midst of a prostitution scandal, Governor Eliot Spitzer resigned his position effective March 17, 2008. Following Spitzer's resignation, Paterson was sworn in as the 55th governor of New York, at the New York State Capitol on March 17, 2008, by New York chief judge Judith Kaye.

Paterson is the first black governor in the history of the state of New York and the fourth black governor in the history of the United States (the first three being the Reconstruction-era P. B. S. Pinchback of Louisiana, Virginia's Douglas Wilder, and Massachusetts's Deval Patrick). The lieutenant governor's office remained vacant until September 22, 2009, when the New York Court of Appeals ruled in a 4–3 decision that Paterson's appointment of Richard Ravitch was constitutional.

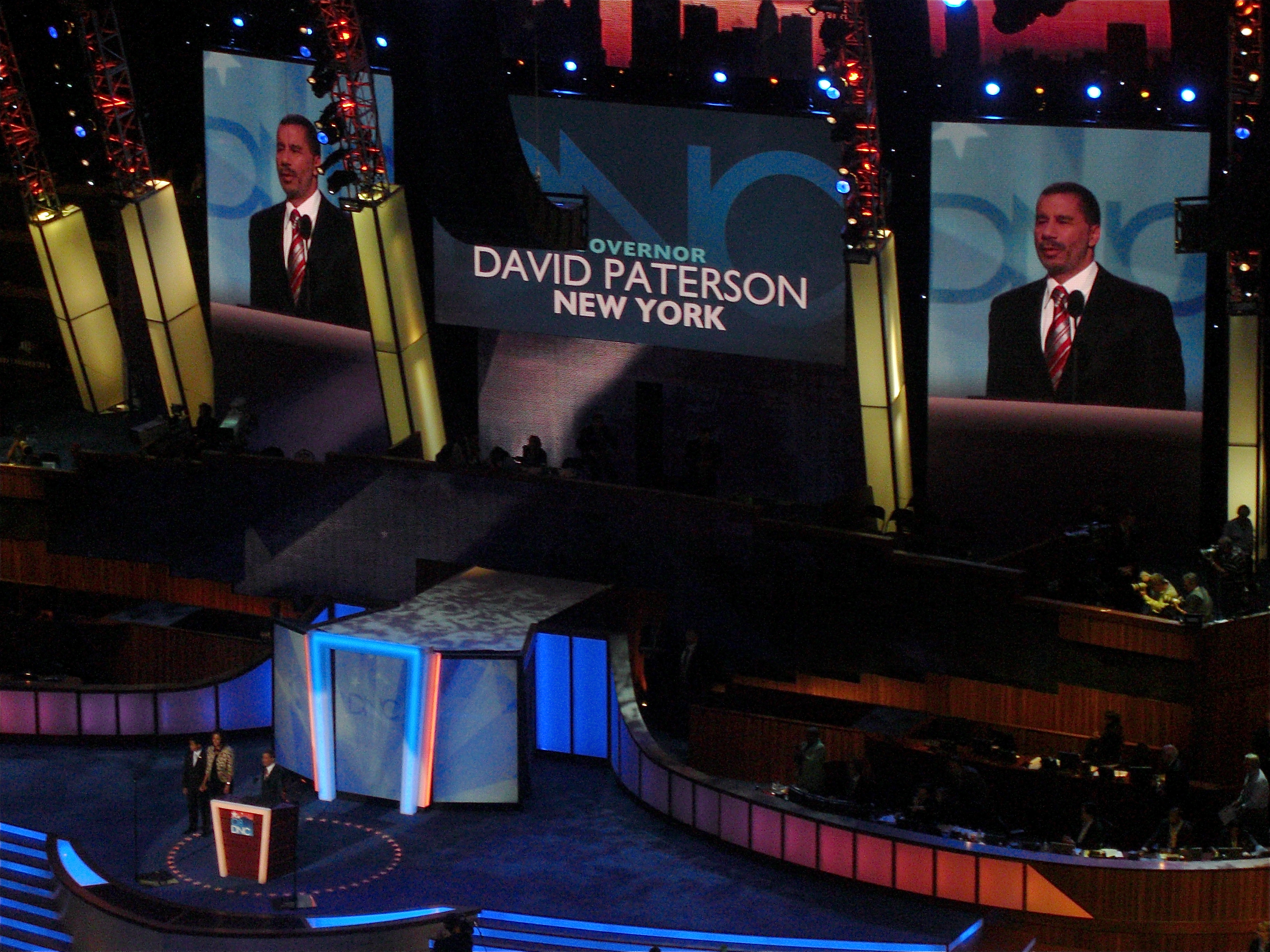
Paterson speaks during the 2008 Democratic National Convention.

Paterson is the second legally blind governor of a U.S. state (the first was Bob C. Riley, who was acting governor of Arkansas for 11 days in January 1975). During his tenure, Paterson's staff read documents to him over voice mail.

On July 17, 2008, Paterson was the keynote speaker addressing the 99th annual convention of the NAACP in Cincinnati, Ohio.

On October 24, 2008, Paterson's top aide, Charles J. O'Byrne, resigned from his post following the revelation that he owed nearly $300,000 in back taxes. O'Byrne admitted to having failed to pay taxes for five years.

Although Paterson is a lifelong Democrat who was considered a liberal in the state Senate, he earned praise from some conservatives during his time as governor for making major spending cuts; for providing mandate relief; and for his appointment of Blue Dog Democrat Kirsten Gillibrand to a vacant seat in the United States Senate.

The Paterson Executive Chamber
| Office | Name | Term |
| Governor | David Paterson | 2008–2010 |
| Lieutenant Governor | Richard Ravitch | 2009–2010 |
| Secretary to the Governor | Charles J. O'Byrne | 2008–2008 |
| General Counsel | Terryl Brown-Clemens | 2008–2010 |
| Communications Director | Risa Heller | 2008–2010 |
| Director of State Operations | Dennis Whalen | 2008–2010 |
| Chief of Staff | Jon Cohen | 2008–2010 |
| Office of the Attorney General | Andrew Cuomo | 2008–2010 |
| Office of the Inspector General | Joseph Fisch | 2008–2010 |
| Office of the Comptroller | Thomas DiNapoli | 2008–2010 |
| Department of Agriculture and Markets | Patrick Hooker | 2008–2010 |
| Department of Banking | Richard H. Neiman | 2008–2010 |
| Department of Civil Service | Nancy G. Groenwegen | 2008–2010 |
| Department of Corrections and Community Supervision | Brian Fischer | 2008–2010 |
| Department of Environmental Conservation | Alexander Pete Grannis | 2008–2010 |
| Education Department | Richard P. Mills | 2008–2010 |
| Department of Health | Richard F. Daines | 2008–2010 |
| Insurance Department | Eric R. Dinallo | 2008–2010 |
| Department of Labor | M. Patricia Smith | 2008–2010 |
| Department of Motor Vehicles | David Swarts | 2008–2010 |
| Department of Military & Naval Affairs | Maj. Gen. Joseph J. Taluto | 2008–2010 |
| Department of Public Service | Gary A. Brown | 2008–2010 |
| Secretary of State | Ruth Noemí Colón (Acting) | 2010–2010 |
| Department of Taxation and Finance | Robert L. Megna | 2008–2010 |
| Department of Transportation | Astrid C. Glynn | 2008–2009 |

=== First days as governor ===
Paterson ascended to the governor's office during the busiest legislative period of the year. The state is required by law to pass its budget prior to April 1. He had only two weeks to negotiate with lawmakers a proposal to close a $4.7 billion deficit and pass a $124 billion budget from the Spitzer administration. He stated in his inauguration speech that it would be his top priority.

Paterson made reference in his speech to the economic woes being faced in the United States, calling them a "crisis", and promised to "adjust the budget accordingly". Since 1984, New York State had only passed a budget on time once, in 2005, leading Paterson to call for an "end to the dysfunction in Albany" in his speech, echoing a 56-page study from the nonpartisan New York University School of Law's Brennan Center for Justice, which referred to the legislature as "the least deliberative and most dysfunctional in the nation".

Paterson quickly signed five pieces of legislation on his first day in office: to add the New York State Department of Labor to the New York City Transit Track Safety Task Force; to eliminate a law that discouraged employers from holding blood drives; to change the way in which members are appointed to a state health and research board; to restore eligibility caps to certain senior employment programs; and to grant tax exemptions to several local development corporations in New York State. Paterson appointed Christopher O. Ward to be executive director of the Port Authority on May 22, 2008. Ward was successful in turning around construction at World Trade Center Site, and started the process of turning Farley Post Office into Moynihan Station.

One day after Paterson's inauguration as the governor of New York, both he and his wife acknowledged having had extramarital affairs. Paterson stated that he had engaged in multiple affairs and added that he had one affair with a state employee. Paterson's affairs reportedly occurred during a period when he and his wife were separated. Paterson also acknowledged that he had used marijuana in his younger years and had tried cocaine.

=== Same-sex marriage ===
In May 2008, Paterson informed New York State agencies that they were required to recognize same-sex marriage licenses from other jurisdictions for purposes of employee benefits. The governor's directive was purportedly based upon a decision from New York Supreme Court, Appellate Division's Fourth Department. The governor's directive did not receive widespread public attention until weeks after the directive was given. At that time, the governor's decision provoked public reaction on both sides of the issue. While Paterson's directive received widespread approval from same-sex marriage supporters, it was met with criticism from conservative legislators and from same-sex marriage opponents, one of whom referred to the directive as Paterson's "first major blunder" as governor. Then-Senate Majority Leader Joseph Bruno and others accused Paterson of having overstepped his bounds and usurped the authority of the legislature. Paterson reportedly described same-sex marriage as "beautiful", and contended that his decision was "the right thing to do"; the governor was enthusiastically cheered when he attended the 2008 gay-pride parade in Manhattan.

On June 3, 2008, a lawsuit was filed by the Alliance Defense Fund challenging the governor's directive. On September 2, 2008, Justice Lucy A. Billings of the State Supreme Court in the Bronx issued a decision that Paterson acted within his powers when he required state agencies to recognize same-sex marriages from outside New York State. In her dismissal of the Alliance Defense Fund suit, Justice Billings found that the governor's order was consistent with state laws on the recognition of marriages from outside the state.

In April 2009, it was revealed that Paterson would propose legislation to legalize same-sex marriage in New York. Paterson later tapped former Senate Majority Leader and former political foe Joseph Bruno to support same-sex marriage in Albany. On December 2, 2009, same-sex marriage legislation was "overwhelmingly" defeated on the floor of the New York State Senate by a vote of 24 to 38; no Republican voted yes, eight Democrats voted no. The Daily News described the defeat as a "major blow", while The New York Times stated that the defeat "all but ensures that the issue is dead in New York until at least 2011, when a new Legislature will be installed."

In late 2010, before the January 2011 expiration of his term as governor, Paterson reached out to members of the New York State Senate in an attempt to gauge support for the passage of same-sex marriage legislation during a lame-duck session of the Legislature; however, the governor came to the conclusion that passage of the bill during the lame-duck session was not feasible. When asked what would have to occur for same-sex marriage to be legalized in New York, Paterson responded, "Get rid of the lobbyists," and added that same-sex marriage advocates had "forced" a Senate floor vote prematurely in December 2009.

=== New York fiscal crisis ===
In March 2008, Paterson warned that New York state faced its worst fiscal crisis since 2001. On July 29, Paterson gave a rare televised address that was broadcast on all of New York's major news networks, stating that the state budget deficit had gone up $1.4 billion over the 90 days since his original budget submission, citing rising costs due to the poor economy and a struggling Wall Street, and calling the state legislature back to Albany for an emergency session starting on August 19, 2008. He also warned that the budget deficit was estimated to grow 22 percent by 2011. With AIG on the verge of collapse on September 16, 2008, and in the aftermath of Lehman Brothers filing for bankruptcy, Paterson publicly lobbied for a government bailout of the insurance giant. He hit the cable networks early and was quoted by media around the world.

Paterson revised Spitzer's record-size executive budget proposal to cut spending. Budget negotiations carried over past the deadline, causing the new governor to lament that too many lawmakers were "unwilling to make serious cuts to our budget". On April 10, 2008, a $121.7 billion budget package was passed by both houses of the state legislature. The budget closed a projected $4.6 billion deficit with $1.8 billion of spending cuts, $1.5 billion in additional revenue from increased taxes and fees and $1.3 billion of one time transfers, and did not tap into the state's $1.2 billion of reserves or increase the top income tax rate on those earning $1 million or more. Paterson's budget provided property tax relief, delivered aid to municipalities, and restored hundreds of millions in property tax rebates for middle-class homeowners and $1 billion for upstate economic development. The budget provided for a tuition remission program for military veterans, offering them free tuition at both SUNY and CUNY institutions.

In April 2008, Paterson asked the heads of all state agencies to cut their budgets by 3.35%, threatened a hiring freeze, and asked legislative leaders to follow suit.

At his first State of the State address in January 2009, Paterson said "My fellow New Yorkers: let me come straight to the point—the state of our state is perilous. New York faces an historic economic challenge, the gravest in nearly a century. ... The pillars of Wall Street have crumbled. The global economy is reeling. Trillions of dollars of wealth have vanished." Paterson's budget proposal called for dramatic across-the-board cuts to various state agencies; he described those cuts as "deep and painful". Paterson proposed to close the 81-year-old Reynolds Game Farm, in Tompkins county, the state's only remaining pheasant facility, but changed course following criticism from sportsmen's groups.

In March 2009, Paterson announced that in light of the fiscal crisis, he would take a 10% pay cut.

=== Appointment of U.S. senator ===
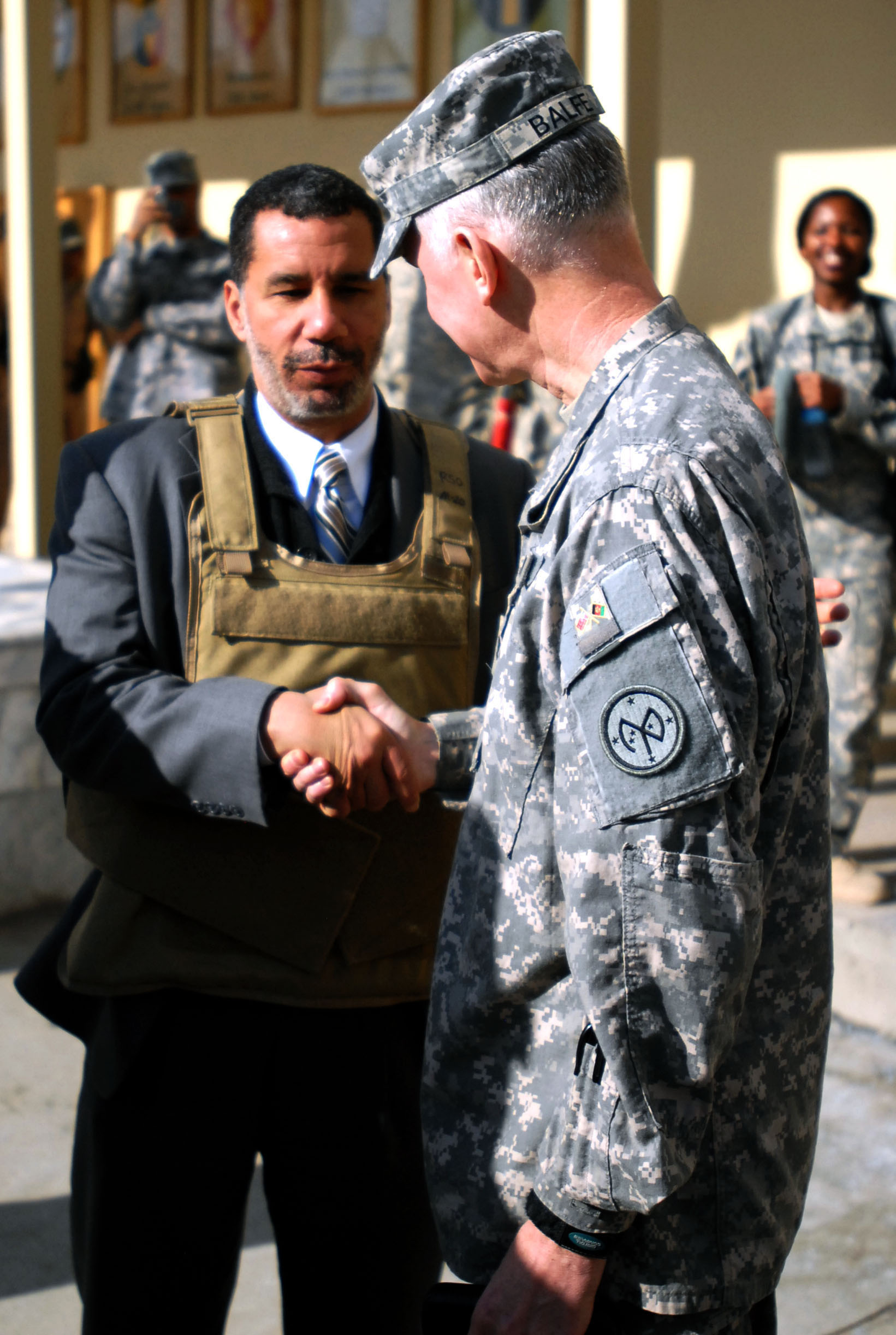
Paterson visiting Kabul in December 2008.

After being nominated for the position on December 1, 2008, Senator Hillary Clinton was confirmed as United States Secretary of State by the United States Senate. Clinton resigned her Senate seat on January 21, 2009, to assume the Cabinet post. By mandate of the New York Constitution, Paterson was tasked with appointing a temporary replacement until a special election in 2010 for the conclusion of the term of her Class 1 seat.

Persons mentioned in the media as potential appointees included U.S. Representative Gregory Meeks, former State Comptroller H. Carl McCall, Bill Thompson, Byron Brown, Representative José E. Serrano, Representative Nydia M. Velázquez, Representative Nita Lowey, Representative Carolyn B. Maloney, former Hillary Clinton aide Leecia Eve, United Federation of Teachers president Randi Weingarten, Representative Kirsten Gillibrand, and political heiress Caroline Kennedy. While New York Attorney General and former United States Secretary of Housing and Urban Development Andrew Cuomo refused to publicly declare his interest in the seat, he attracted a plurality of support from polled New Yorkers to take the seat. Cuomo was cited by some analysts as a savvy Senate appointee because his appointment might dissuade him from mounting a primary challenge against Paterson in the 2010 gubernatorial election. Paterson acknowledged on January 20, 2009, that Cuomo was indeed under consideration for the appointment.

It was reported on December 5, 2008, that Paterson had spoken with Kennedy regarding her interest in the Senate seat. However, Kennedy abruptly withdrew her name from consideration on January 21, 2009. Up until her withdrawal, which Kennedy said was based on "personal reasons", the high-profile, well-connected daughter of former President John F. Kennedy was widely considered the front-runner for the appointment. After Kennedy removed herself from consideration, some reports indicated that Paterson "never intended" to pick Kennedy, having come to consider her "unready" for the seat after a series of media misfires. Some sources and analysts doubted the reports' veracity, calling the Paterson camp's denials of any interest in appointing Kennedy "misdirection".

On January 23, 2009, Paterson chose Gillibrand—a moderate upstate representative from a largely conservative district—to fill Clinton's vacated seat. The Kennedy family criticized Paterson's handling of the appointment. Although Gillibrand's appointment was praised by some (including Chuck Schumer, New York's senior senator; President Obama; and Clinton herself) others criticized Paterson's choice, calling Gillibrand "sharp-elbowed", "too conservative", and "unliked". Others, including liberal New York Times editorialist Maureen Dowd and New York Magazine writer Chris Smith, criticized Paterson's "peculiar" and "dithering" handling of the Senate appointment and suggested it was a cynical way of rallying upstate support for re-election. Paterson later admitted that he personally ordered his staff to contest Caroline Kennedy's version of events in the hours after she withdrew from consideration to be United States senator.

=== Appointment of new lieutenant governor ===
Due to the ongoing leadership crisis in the New York State Senate, in which the Senate tied with 31 Democratic votes and 31 Republican votes, with no presiding officer to break the tie, Paterson announced on July 8, 2009, that he would appoint Richard Ravitch, a former chairman of the Metropolitan Transportation Authority, to be lieutenant governor. On August 20, 2009, however, a four-judge panel of the New York State Appellate Division, Second Judicial Department, ruled that Paterson had no legal authority to name a lieutenant governor, and that the lieutenant governor position could not be filled in any way other than via an election. On September 23, 2009, the New York Court of Appeals reversed the Appellate Division's decision, holding Paterson's appointment of Ravitch to be constitutional.

=== Allegations of corruption ===
In January 2010, Paterson awarded a contract to operate a 4,500-slot machine racino at the Aqueduct Race Track to Aqueduct Race Track Entertainment Group (AEG) in Queens. The selection of AEG led to accusations of favoritism. The New York State inspector general, Joseph Fisch, said the state government showed "militant indifference" to the public's best interest. Fisch criticized Paterson for delegating the process to his aides, who Fisch said did not keep him properly informed. On March 9, 2010, Paterson recused himself from the case, saying that he was doing so on the advice of his lawyers. On the same day, investors Floyd Flake and Jay-Z withdrew from AEG. Flake had a 0.6% share.

In February 2010, The New York Times reported that Paterson may have been involved in witness tampering in a domestic-abuse case involving staffer David W. Johnson after New York State Police and Paterson allegedly talked to the complainant in an attempt to persuade her to drop the case. Paterson was said to have asked the woman if she needed any help a day before the case was dropped. On February 26, 2010, Paterson withdrew his bid for a full term as governor of New York.

In March 2010, the New York State Commission on Public Integrity asked Attorney General Andrew Cuomo to investigate allegations that Paterson had solicited an unlawful gift of free New York Yankees tickets. He also faced allegations that he had lied under oath to the Commission on Public Integrity in 2010 during an investigation about the Yankees tickets.

Following the "twin scandals", a poll showed that fewer than half of New Yorkers believed Paterson should remain in office. Despite this, Paterson announced on March 5, 2010, that he intended to remain in his post until his term in office concluded at the end of the year.

Paterson was not criminally charged in connection with his witness interaction in the Johnson domestic abuse matter. On December 20, 2010, the Commission on Public Integrity found that Paterson had lied about accepting five free World Series tickets and fined him $62,125.

=== Saturday Night Live ===
After the Weekend Update sketch featuring David Paterson aired in 2009 on the NBC show Saturday Night Live, Paterson was upset by the way the sketch portrayed him, stating that it was an offensive stereotype to those who were visually impaired. On the 36th-season premiere of Saturday Night Live (aired September 25, 2010), Paterson appeared in the Weekend Update sketch alongside Fred Armisen, who was comedically portraying Paterson.

== 2010 gubernatorial election ==
In October 2008, Paterson launched a campaign website and announced his intention to run for a full term as governor in 2010. Paterson's prime Republican opponent was expected to be former New York City mayor Rudy Giuliani. By February 2009, after the prolonged Senate appointment process, a Siena College poll indicated that Paterson was losing popularity among New Yorkers and showed Giuliani with a fifteen-point lead in a hypothetical contest. In April 2009, a Quinnipiac poll found that 60% of voters disapproved of Paterson's performance (the worst-ever rating for a New York governor); 53% believed that Paterson should withdraw his candidacy for the gubernatorial election. In an August 21, 2009, radio interview, Paterson suggested that his low popularity was caused by racism and added that Gov. Deval Patrick of Massachusetts had received a similar reception. Paterson added that President Barack Obama would be the next African-American elected official to suffer from poor approval due to his skin color. The White House asked Paterson to tone down his comments on race, but less than 24 hours later, Paterson said: "[One] very successful minority is permissible; but when you see too many success stories, then some people get nervous." Giuliani never ran for Governor. Eventually, Republicans nominated Carl Paladino.

On September 18, 2009, advisors to President Barack Obama informed Paterson that the President believed Paterson should withdraw his 2010 gubernatorial candidacy and clear a path for "popular Attorney General Andrew Cuomo" to run. According to The New York Times, Obama was worried that Paterson's continued unpopularity could hinder the campaigns of New York's Democratic congressmembers and could also topple Democratic control of the state legislature. The Times cited a potential gubernatorial run by Giuliani as another reason for the Obama administration's request. On September 19, 2009, Paterson insisted he was still running. He reiterated his position on February 9, 2010, saying, "[The] only way I'm not going to be governor next year is at the ballot box and the only way I'll be leaving office before is in a box". On February 26, 2010, however, Paterson withdrew his bid for a full term as governor of New York "amid crumbling support from his party and an uproar over his administration's intervention in a domestic violence case involving a close aide". Later in 2010, Cuomo became the Democratic nominee for governor of New York and won the election in a landslide over Paladino.

== Later career ==
After leaving office at the end of 2010, Paterson appeared on New York radio station WOR on a number of occasions as a substitute talk-show host, filling in for morning host John Gambling. On September 1, 2011, the station announced that Paterson would become the regular weekday afternoon drive-time host beginning on September 6. He replaced Steve Malzberg. In December 2012, Paterson was let go from his radio show at WOR after Clear Channel purchased the station.

In 2012, then-governor Andrew Cuomo appointed Paterson to the board of the Metropolitan Transit Authority. Paterson was confirmed to this post in June 2012.

In July 2013, Paterson said that he might run for Congress if U.S. Representative Charles Rangel retired. In December 2013, however, Paterson stated that he had "no intention of running for Congress in the 13th District, either now or in the future".

Paterson was appointed in 2013 to be a distinguished professor of health care and public policy, at Touro College, in Harlem, and to advise the Touro College of Osteopathic Medicine on public policy issues. Paterson was a director for investments with Stifel, Nicolaus & Company, a financial services holding company.

In early 2014, Paterson unveiled his portrait that hangs in the Hall of Governors in the New York State Capitol.

In May 2014, Andrew Cuomo appointed Paterson chairman of the New York Democratic Party. On October 7, 2015, Paterson announced that he would leave that position following the November elections. Paterson oversaw victories in the 2014 state elections, where Democrats held the governor, attorney general, and comptroller positions.

Paterson released his book Black, Blind, & In Charge: A Story of Visionary Leadership and Overcoming Adversity in late 2020. The book discussed not only his life, but the figures around him and the history that affected him.

In the 2021 New York City Democratic mayoral primary, Paterson endorsed the eventual winner of the primary, Eric Adams.

In August 2022, New York Governor Kathy Hochul planted a tree in Paterson's honor at the New York State Executive Mansion. Paterson endorsed Kathy Hochul in the 2022 New York gubernatorial election.

In March 2023, a building on Eagle Street, in Albany, New York was named after Governor Paterson to commemorate the 15th anniversary of assuming the governorship. In 2024, Paterson and his band played a show in the building named after him in Albany.

In June 2025, Paterson endorsed Andrew Cuomo in the 2025 New York City mayoral election. After Zohran Mamdani defeated Cuomo in the Democratic primary, Paterson called on members of the Democratic party to join forces to defeat Mamdani in the general election.

== Personal life ==
In 1992, Paterson and Michelle Paige married. Two years later, they had a son. After Paterson's inauguration as the governor of New York, both he and his wife acknowledged having had extramarital affairs. Paterson stated that he had engaged in multiple affairs and added that he had one affair with a state employee. Paterson's affairs reportedly occurred during a period when he and his wife were separated. David and Michele Paterson separated in 2012 and filed for divorce in January 2014.

In 2019, Paterson married Mary Sliwa (née Galda) in New York City in a ceremony officiated by former New York Mayor David Dinkins at The Water Club. Mary Paterson was formerly married to Curtis Sliwa, with whom Paterson once co-hosted the morning AM radio show "Curtis and the Gov".

Paterson has acknowledged that he used marijuana in his younger years and has tried cocaine.

In October 2024, Paterson and his stepson Anthony Sliwa suffered minor injuries from an assault in New York City's Upper East Side by a group of four men and one woman. Two adults and two minors were later charged in the incident.

Paterson is Catholic.

== Works ==
- Paterson, David A. (September 29, 2020). Black, Blind, & in Charge: A Story of Visionary Leadership and Overcoming Adversity. New York: Skyhorse Publishing. ISBN 9781510756335. OCLC 1201201412.

== See also ==
- List of minority governors and lieutenant governors in the United States

New York State Senate
| Preceded by Martin Connor | Minority Leader of the New York State Senate; 2003–2006 | Succeeded by Malcolm Smith |
Party political offices
| Preceded by Dennis Mehiel | Democratic nominee for Lieutenant Governor of New York; 2006 | Succeeded by Robert Duffy |
| Preceded by Mary Donohue | Independence nominee for Lieutenant Governor of New York; 2006 | Succeeded by Robert Duffy |
| Preceded by Keith L. T. Wright | Chair of the New York Democratic Party; 2014–2015 | Succeeded by Sheila Comar |
Political offices
| Preceded by Mary Donohue | Lieutenant Governor of New York; 2007–2008 | Succeeded by Joseph Bruno; Acting |
| Preceded by Eliot Spitzer | Governor of New York; 2008–2010 | Succeeded by Andrew Cuomo |
U.S. order of precedence (ceremonial)
| Preceded by Eliot Spitzer as Former Governor | Order of precedence of the United States; Within New York | Succeeded by Jack Markell as Former Governor |
| Preceded by Eliot Spitzer as Former Governor | Order of precedence of the United States; Outside New York | Succeeded by James G. Martin as Former Governor |
