= 2014 United States House of Representatives elections in New York =

- November 4, 2014

All 27 New York seats to the United States House of Representatives
	Majority party	Minority party
Party	Democratic	Republican
Last election	21	6
Seats won	18	9
Seat change	▼3	▲3
Popular vote	2,009,444	1,554,274
Percentage	55.13%	42.65%
Swing	▼2.87%	▲11.00%

Democratic hold
Republican hold Republican gain
Democratic
40–50%
50–60%
60–70%
70–80%
80–90%
90–100%
Republican
40–50%
50–60%
60–70%
70–80%
80–90%
90–100%

The 2014 United States House of Representatives elections in New York were held on Tuesday, November 4, 2014, to elect the 27 U.S. representatives from the state of New York, one from each of the state's 27 congressional districts. The elections coincided with other elections to the United States Senate and House of Representatives and various state and local elections, including the governor, attorney general, and comptroller of New York.

The candidate filing deadline was April 14 and the primary elections were held on June 24.

== Overview ==
United States House of Representatives elections in New York, 2014
Party	Votes	Percentage	Seats	+/–
Democratic	2,009,444	51.07%	18	-3
Republican	1,554,274	39.50%	9	+3
Conservative	37,622	0.96%	0	
Green	34,580	0.88%	0	
Others	298,785	7.59%	0	
Totals	3,934,705	100.00%	27	

Popular vote
Democratic	51.07%
Republican	39.50%
Other	9.43%

House seats by party nomination
Democratic	66.67%
Working Families	62.96%
Independence	37.04%
Republican	33.33%
Conservative	29.63%

House seats by party registration
Democratic	66.67%
Republican	33.33%

=== By district ===
Results of the 2014 United States House of Representatives elections in New York by district:

District	Democratic		Republican		Others		Total	Result
District	Votes	%	Votes	%	Votes	%	Votes	Result
District 1	78,722	45.57%	94,035	54.43%	0	0.00%	172,757	Republican gain
District 2	41,814	30.02%	95,177	68.34%	2,281	1.64%	139,272	Republican hold
District 3	90,032	54.80%	74,269	45.20%	0	0.00%	164,301	Democratic hold
District 4	89,793	52.84%	80,127	47.16%	0	0.00%	169,920	Democratic hold
District 5	75,712	95.14%	0	0.00%	3,870	4.86%	79,582	Democratic hold
District 6	55,368	100.00%	0	0.00%	0	0.00%	55,368	Democratic hold
District 7	56,593	88.84%	5,713	8.97%	1,398	2.19%	63,704	Democratic hold
District 8	77,255	92.05%	0	0.00%	6,673	7.95%	83,928	Democratic hold
District 9	82,659	89.47%	0	0.00%	9,727	10.53%	92,386	Democratic hold
District 10	89,080	87.61%	0	0.00%	12,596	12.39%	101,676	Democratic hold
District 11	45,244	42.36%	58,886	55.13%	2,687	2.52%	106,817	Republican hold
District 12	90,603	79.94%	22,731	20.06%	0	0.00%	113,334	Democratic hold
District 13	68,396	87.46%	0	0.00%	9,806	12.54%	78,202	Democratic hold
District 14	50,352	88.20%	0	0.00%	6,735	11.80%	57,087	Democratic hold
District 15	54,906	97.14%	0	0.00%	1,615	2.86%	56,521	Democratic hold
District 16	99,658	100.00%	0	0.00%	0	0.00%	99,658	Democratic hold
District 17	98,150	56.43%	75,781	43.57%	0	0.00%	173,931	Democratic hold
District 18	88,993	49.73%	85,660	47.87%	4,294	2.40%	178,947	Democratic hold
District 19	72,470	35.51%	131,594	64.49%	0	0.00%	204,064	Republican hold
District 20	125,111	61.26%	79,104	38.74%	0	0.00%	204,215	Democratic hold
District 21	59,063	33.84%	96,226	55.14%	19,238	11.02%	174,527	Republican gain
District 22	0	0.00%	129,851	100.00%	0	0.00%	129,851	Republican hold
District 23	70,242	38.31%	113,130	61.69%	0	0.00%	183,372	Republican hold
District 24	80,304	40.40%	118,474	59.60%	0	0.00%	198,778	Republican gain
District 25	96,803	50.23%	95,932	49.77%	0	0.00%	192,735	Democratic hold
District 26	113,210	68.15%	52,909	31.85%	0	0.00%	166,119	Democratic hold
District 27	58,911	28.94%	144,675	71.06%	0	0.00%	203,586	Republican hold
Total	2,009,444	55.13%	1,554,274	42.65%	80,920	2.22%	3,644,638	

== District 1 ==
2014 New York's 1st congressional district election
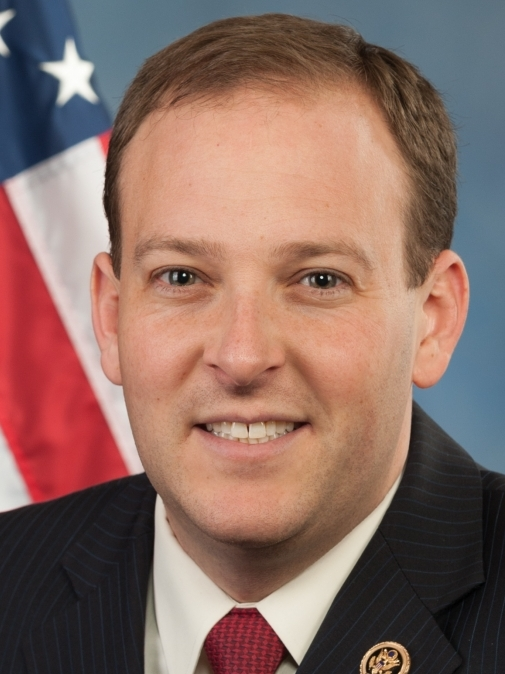

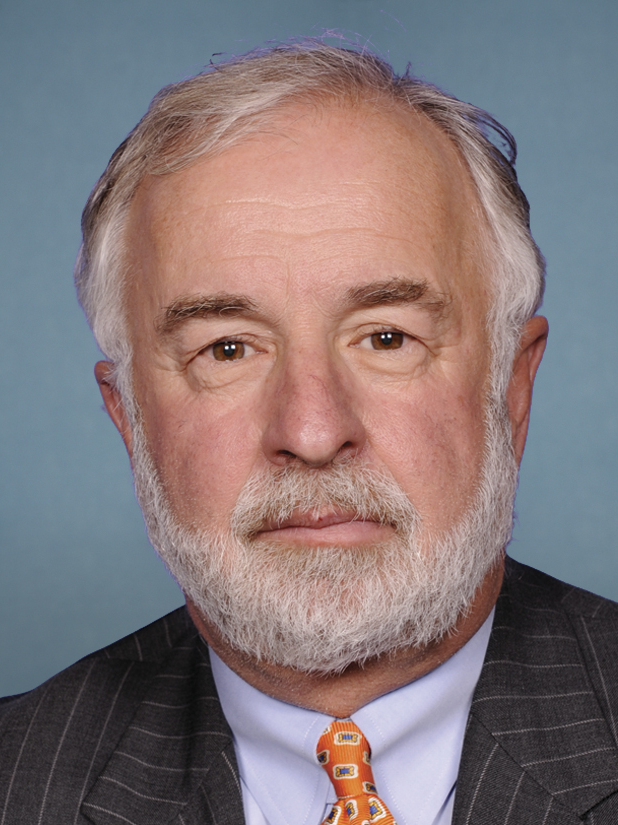
	Majority party	Minority party
Candidate	Lee Zeldin	Tim Bishop
Party	Republican	Democratic
Alliance	Conservative	Independence; Working Families
Popular vote	94,035	78,722
Percentage	54.4%	45.6%
- County results Zeldin: 50–60%
U.S. Representative before election
Tim Bishop
Democratic
Elected U.S. Representative
Lee Zeldin
Republican

The 1st district was located in eastern Long Island and includes most of central and eastern Suffolk County. The incumbent Democrat Tim Bishop, who had represented the district since 2003, ran for re-election. He was re-elected with 52% of the vote in 2012, and the district had a PVI of R+2.

=== Democratic primary ===
==== Candidates ====
===== Nominee =====
- Tim Bishop, incumbent U.S. Representative

Bishop also received the Independence and Working Families nominations.

=== Republican primary ===
County Republican committees designated State Senator Lee Zeldin, who was the nominee for the seat in 2008, as their nominee. On June 24, 2014, Zeldin defeated former prosecutor George Demos, who had challenged him in a primary.

==== Candidates ====
===== Nominee =====
- Lee Zeldin, state senator and nominee for this seat in 2008

===== Eliminated in primary =====
- George Demos, former Securities and Exchange Commission prosecutor and candidate for this seat in 2010

==== Endorsements ====
George Demos

State officials

- George Pataki, former Governor of New York

Local officials

- Rudy Giuliani, former Mayor of New York City
Lee Zeldin

U.S. Senators

- John McCain, U.S. Senator from Arizona and Republican presidential nominee in 2008
- Rick Santorum, U.S. Senator from Pennsylvania and Republican presidential candidate in 2012

Organizations

- United States Chamber of Commerce

==== Results ====
Republican primary results
Party	Candidate	Votes	%
Republican	Lee Zeldin	10,283	61.3
Republican	George Demos	6,482	38.7
Total votes		16,765	100.0

Zeldin also received the Conservative nomination.

=== General election ===
==== Campaign ====
In September 2013, the Office of Congressional Ethics recommended further review of an August 2012 incident in which Bishop was accused of soliciting a campaign contribution from hedge fund magnate Eric Semler in exchange for acting in an official capacity to obtain a fireworks permit for Semler's son's bar mitzvah on Long Island. Bishop denied the allegations as "outrageous, unfounded attacks on my character and my family". After the incident was picked up by the media, Semler called the allegations a "nonstory".

Despite the Federal Bureau of Investigation investigating the incident, in September the Justice Department closed its investigation without filing charges.

However, the NRCC and other right wing groups exploited the incident to paint Bishop as a corrupt Washington insider.

==== Endorsements ====
Tim Bishop (D)

Labor unions

- AFL-CIO
- International Brotherhood of Boilermakers
- National Association of Letter Carriers

Organizations

- Democratic Congressional Campaign Committee "Frontline" Program
- Everytown for Gun Safety
- Sierra Club
Lee Zeldin (R)

U.S. Senators

- John McCain, U.S. Senator from Arizona and Republican presidential nominee in 2008
- Rick Santorum, U.S. Senator from Pennsylvania and Republican presidential candidate in 2012

Organizations

- BIPAC
- National Federation of Independent Business
- National Republican Congressional Committee "Young Guns" Program
- National Rifle Association - Political Victory Fund
- National Right to Life Committee
- United States Chamber of Commerce

==== Polling ====
Poll source	Date(s) administered	Sample size	Margin of error	Tim Bishop (D)	Lee Zeldin (R)	Undecided
Siena College	October 26–29, 2014	670	± 3.8%	45%	50%	5%
New York Times/CBS News Battleground Tracker	October 16–23, 2014	324	± 9.0%	40%	45%	15%
Public Opinion Strategies	September 23–25, 2014	400	± 4.9%	46%	46%	8%
Harper Polling	September 21–22, 2014	568	± 4.1%	44%	44%	12%
Siena College	September 7–11, 2014	592	± 4%	51%	41%	8%

==== Predictions ====
Source	Ranking	As of
The Cook Political Report	Tossup	November 3, 2014
Rothenberg	Tossup	October 24, 2014
Sabato's Crystal Ball	Lean R (flip)	October 30, 2014
RCP	Tossup	November 2, 2014
Daily Kos Elections	Tossup	November 4, 2014

==== Results ====
New York's 1st congressional district, 2014
Party	Candidate	Votes	%
Republican	Lee Zeldin	77,062	44.6
Conservative	Lee Zeldin	16,973	9.8
Total	Lee Zeldin	94,035	54.4
Democratic	Tim Bishop	68,387	39.6
Working Families	Tim Bishop	5,457	3.2
Independence	Tim Bishop	4,878	2.8
Total	Tim Bishop (incumbent)	78,722	45.6
Total votes		172,757	100.0
Republican gain from Democratic			

== District 2 ==
2014 New York's 2nd congressional district election
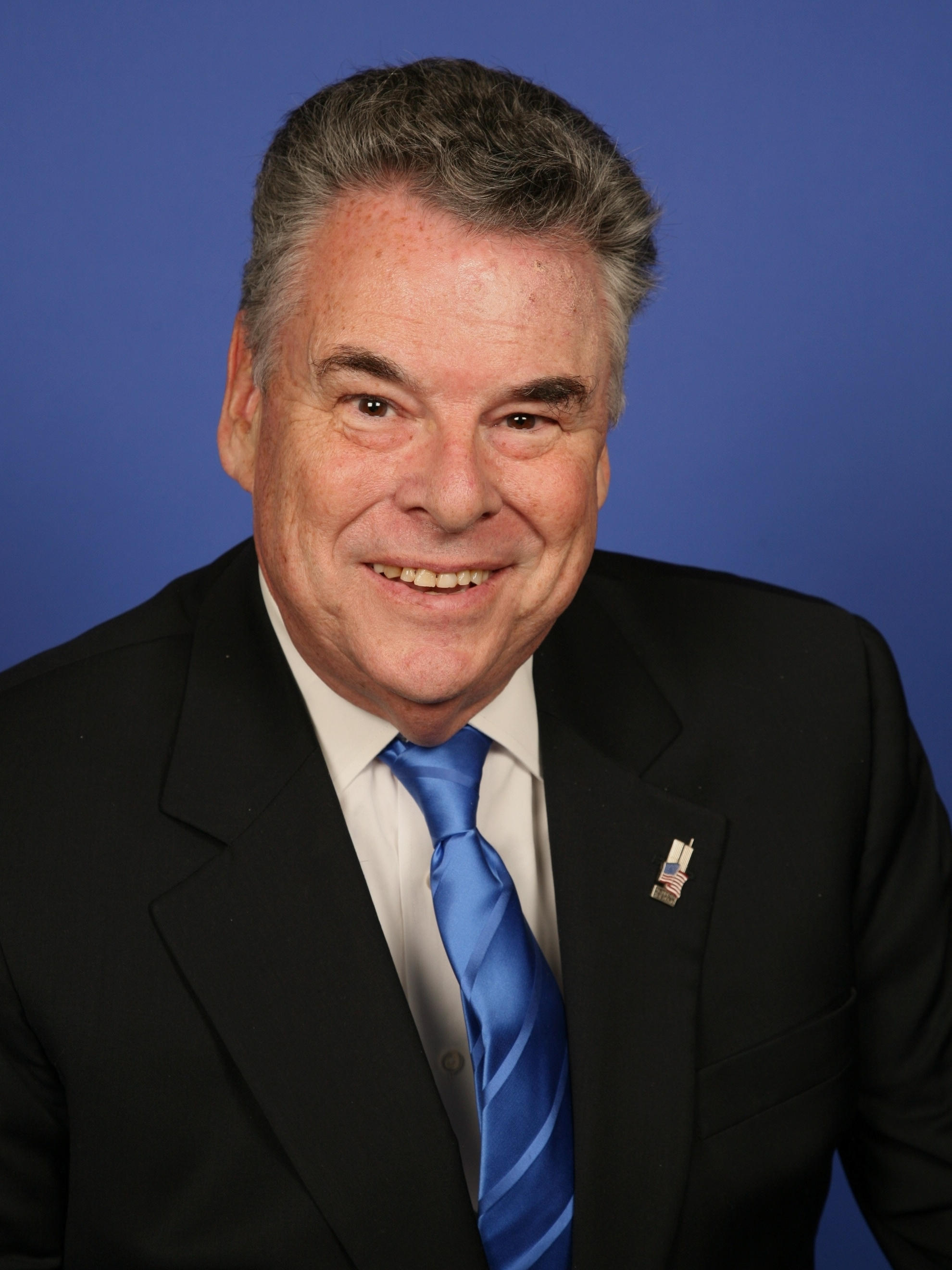

	Majority party	Minority party
Candidate	Peter T. King	Patricia Maher
Party	Republican	Democratic
Alliance	Conservative; Independence
Popular vote	95,177	41,814
Percentage	68.3%	30.0%
- County results King: 50–60% 70–80%
U.S. Representative before election
Peter T. King
Republican
Elected U.S. Representative
Peter T. King
Republican

The 2nd district was based along the South Shore of Long Island and includes southwestern Suffolk County and a small portion of southeastern Nassau County. The incumbent Republican Peter T. King, who had represented the district since 2013 and had previously represented the 3rd district from 1993 to 2013, ran for re-election. He was re-elected with 59% of the vote in 2012. The district had a PVI of R+1.

=== Republican primary ===
==== Candidates ====
===== Nominee =====
- Peter King, incumbent U.S. Representative

King also received the Conservative and Independence Party nominations.

=== Democratic primary ===
==== Candidates ====
===== Nominee =====
- Patricia Maher, civic association president and former health-care executive

===== Declined =====
- Kathleen Rice, Nassau County District Attorney

=== Green primary ===
==== Candidates ====
===== Nominee =====
- William D. Stevenson

=== General election ===
==== Endorsements ====
Peter King (R)

Labor unions

- International Brotherhood of Boilermakers
- National Association of Letter Carriers

Organizations

- Everytown for Gun Safety
- National Right to Life Committee

==== Polling ====
Poll source	Date(s) administered	Sample size	Margin of error	Peter King (R)	Patricia Maher (D)	William Stevenson (G)	Undecided
New York Times/CBS News Battleground Tracker	October 16–23, 2014	101	± 13.0%	54%	42%	1%	3%

==== Predictions ====
Source	Ranking	As of
The Cook Political Report	Safe R	November 3, 2014
Rothenberg	Safe R	October 24, 2014
Sabato's Crystal Ball	Safe R	October 30, 2014
RCP	Safe R	November 2, 2014
Daily Kos Elections	Safe R	November 4, 2014

==== Results ====
New York's 2nd congressional district, 2014
Party	Candidate	Votes	%
Republican	Peter T. King	76,659	55.0
Conservative	Peter T. King	13,789	9.9
Independence	Peter T. King	4,729	3.4
Total	Peter T. King (incumbent)	95,177	68.3
Democratic	Patricia Maher	41,814	30.0
Green	William D. Stevenson	2,281	1.7
Total votes		139,272	100.0
Republican hold			

== District 3 ==
2014 New York's 3rd congressional district election
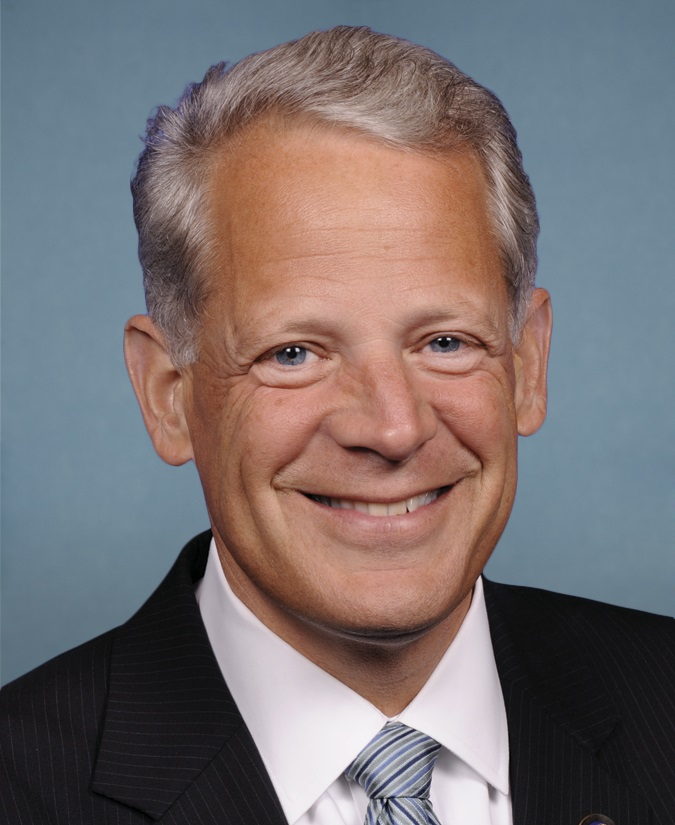

	Majority party	Minority party
Candidate	Steve Israel	Grant Lally
Party	Democratic	Republican
Alliance	Independence; Working Families	Conservative
Popular vote	90,032	74,269
Percentage	54.8%	45.2%
- County results Israel: 50–60%
U.S. Representative before election
Steve Israel
Democratic
Elected U.S. Representative
Steve Israel
Democratic

The 3rd district included most of the North Shore of Long Island. It extended from northwestern Suffolk County across northern Nassau County and into far northeastern Queens. Incumbent Democrat Steve Israel, who had represented the district since 2013 and previously represented the 2nd district from 2001 to 2013, ran for re-election. He was re-elected with 58% of the vote in 2012. The district had an even PVI.

Like King in the neighboring 2nd district, Israel had consistently performed well despite his district's swing nature.

=== Democratic primary ===
==== Candidates ====
===== Nominee =====
- Steve Israel, incumbent U.S. Representative

He also received the Independence and Working Families nominations.

=== Republican primary ===
==== Candidates ====
===== Nominee =====
- Grant Lally, attorney and nominee for the 5th district in 1994 & 1996

===== Eliminated in primary =====
- Stephen Labate, U.S. Army reservist, financial planning advisor and nominee for this seat in 2012

==== Results ====
Republican primary results
Party	Candidate	Votes	%
Republican	Grant M. Lally	3,439	50.1
Republican	Stephen A. Labate	3,428	49.9
Total votes		6,867	100.0

Lally also received the Conservative nomination.

=== General election ===
==== Endorsements ====
Steve Israel (D)

Labor unions

- AFL-CIO
- International Brotherhood of Boilermakers
- National Association of Letter Carriers

Organizations

- Everytown for Gun Safety
- Sierra Club

==== Polling ====
Poll source	Date(s) administered	Sample size	Margin of error	Steve Israel (D)	Grant Lally (R)	Undecided
New York Times/CBS News Battleground Tracker	October 16–23, 2014	108	± 13.0%	54%	29%	17%

==== Predictions ====
Source	Ranking	As of
The Cook Political Report	Safe D	November 3, 2014
Rothenberg	Safe D	October 24, 2014
Sabato's Crystal Ball	Safe D	October 30, 2014
RCP	Safe D	November 2, 2014
Daily Kos Elections	Safe D	November 4, 2014

==== Results ====
New York's 3rd congressional district, 2014
Party	Candidate	Votes	%
Democratic	Steve Israel	80,393	48.9
Working Families	Steve Israel	5,191	3.2
Independence	Steve Israel	4,448	2.7
Total	Steve Israel (incumbent)	90,032	54.8
Republican	Grant Lally	63,219	38.5
Conservative	Grant Lally	11,050	6.7
Total	Grant Lally	74,269	45.2
Total votes		164,301	100.0
Democratic hold			

== District 4 ==
2014 New York's 4th congressional district election
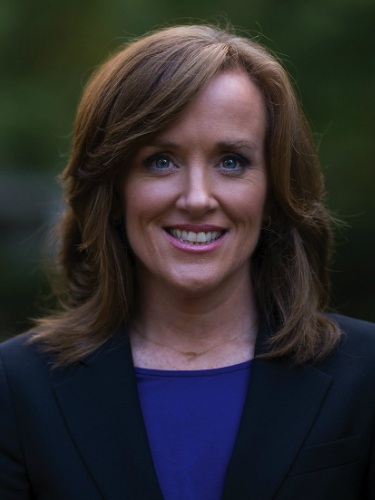

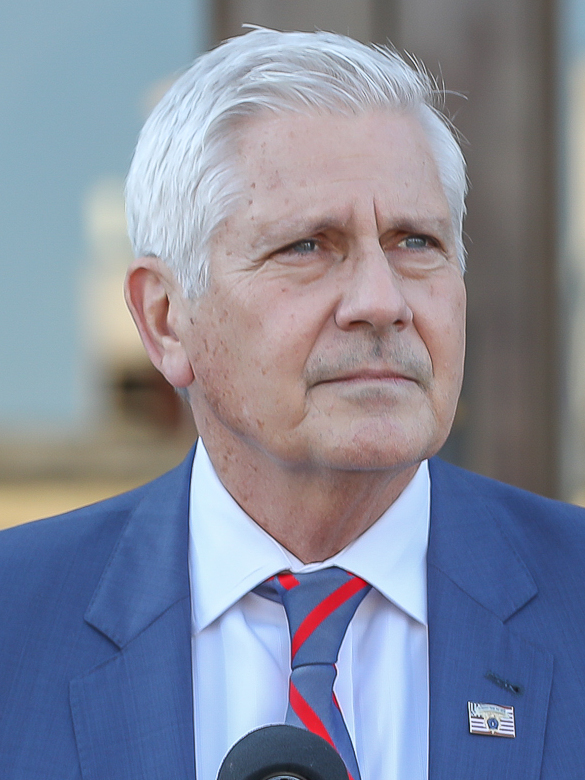
	Majority party	Minority party
Candidate	Kathleen Rice	Bruce Blakeman
Party	Democratic	Republican
Alliance	Working Families	Conservative; Independence
Popular vote	89,793	80,127
Percentage	52.8%	47.2%
- County results Rice: 50–60%
U.S. Representative before election
Carolyn McCarthy
Democratic
Elected U.S. Representative
Kathleen Rice
Democratic

The 4th district was located in central and southern Nassau County. Incumbent Democrat Carolyn McCarthy, who had represented the district since 1997, retired. She was re-elected with 62% of the vote in 2012. The district had a PVI of D+3.

=== Democratic primary ===
On January 8, 2014, McCarthy announced that she would not seek re-election due to complications from lung cancer. She would instead endorse Nassau County DA Kathleen Rice.

==== Candidates ====
===== Nominee =====
- Kathleen Rice, Nassau County District Attorney

===== Eliminated in primary =====
- Kevan Abrahams, Democratic Leader in the Nassau County Legislature

===== Declined =====
- Dave Denenberg, Nassau County Legislator
- Laura Gillen, attorney and nominee for Nassau County clerk in 2013
- Carolyn McCarthy, incumbent U.S. Representative
- Patricia Norris-McDonald, Mayor of Malverne
- Carmen Piñeyro, Freeport trustee

==== Results ====
Democratic primary results
Party	Candidate	Votes	%
Democratic	Kathleen M. Rice	7,770	57.3
Democratic	Kevan M. Abrahams	5,791	42.7
Total votes		13,561	100.0

Rice also received the Working Families nomination.

=== Republican primary ===
==== Candidates ====
===== Nominee =====
- Bruce Blakeman, former Nassau County Legislative Majority Leader and Presiding Officer, nominee for New York State Comptroller in 1998 and the Tax Revolt Party nominee for the U.S. Senate in 2010

===== Eliminated in primary =====
- Frank Scaturro, attorney, historian and candidate for this seat in 2010 & 2012

===== Declined =====
- Fran Becker, Nassau County Legislator and nominee for this seat in 2010 & 2012
- Kate Murray, Hempstead Town Supervisor

==== Results ====
Republican primary results
Party	Candidate	Votes	%
Republican	Bruce A. Blakeman	9,083	66.0
Republican	Frank J. Scaturro	4,687	34.0
Total votes		13,770	100.0

Scaturro, who was the Conservative Party nominee in 2012, received their nomination again, but dropped out of the race. Blakeman ultimately received both the Conservative and Independence Party nominations.

=== Conservative primary ===
==== Results ====
Conservative Party of New York State primary results
Party	Candidate	Votes	%
Conservative	Bruce A. Blakeman	664	66.6
Conservative	Opportunity To Ballot	333	33.4
Total votes		997	100.0

=== General election ===
==== Endorsements ====
Kathleen Rice (D)

Labor unions

- AFL-CIO
- International Brotherhood of Boilermakers
- National Association of Letter Carriers

Organizations

- Democratic Congressional Campaign Committee "Red to Blue" Program
- EMILY's List
- Everytown for Gun Safety
- Sierra Club
Bruce Blakeman (R)

Organizations

- National Republican Congressional Committee "Young Guns" Program

==== Polling ====
Poll source	Date(s) administered	Sample size	Margin of error	Kathleen Rice (D)	Bruce Blakeman (R)	Undecided
New York Times/CBS News Battleground Tracker	October 16–23, 2014	107	± 12.0%	52%	36%	6%
Siena College	October 16–20, 2014	628	± 3.9%	52%	42%	6%
Siena College	September 10–15, 2014	596	± 4.0%	55%	37%	8%

==== Predictions ====
Source	Ranking	As of
The Cook Political Report	Likely D	November 3, 2014
Rothenberg	Safe D	October 24, 2014
Sabato's Crystal Ball	Safe D	October 30, 2014
RCP	Likely D	November 2, 2014
Daily Kos Elections	Likely D	November 4, 2014

==== Results ====
New York's 4th congressional district, 2014
Party	Candidate	Votes	%
Democratic	Kathleen Rice	83,772	49.3
Working Families	Kathleen Rice	6,021	3.5
Total	Kathleen Rice	89,793	52.8
Republican	Bruce Blakeman	67,811	39.9
Conservative	Bruce Blakeman	9,879	5.9
Independence	Bruce Blakeman	2,437	1.4
Total	Bruce Blakeman	80,127	47.2
Total votes		169,920	100.0
Democratic hold			

== District 5 ==
2014 New York's 5th congressional district election
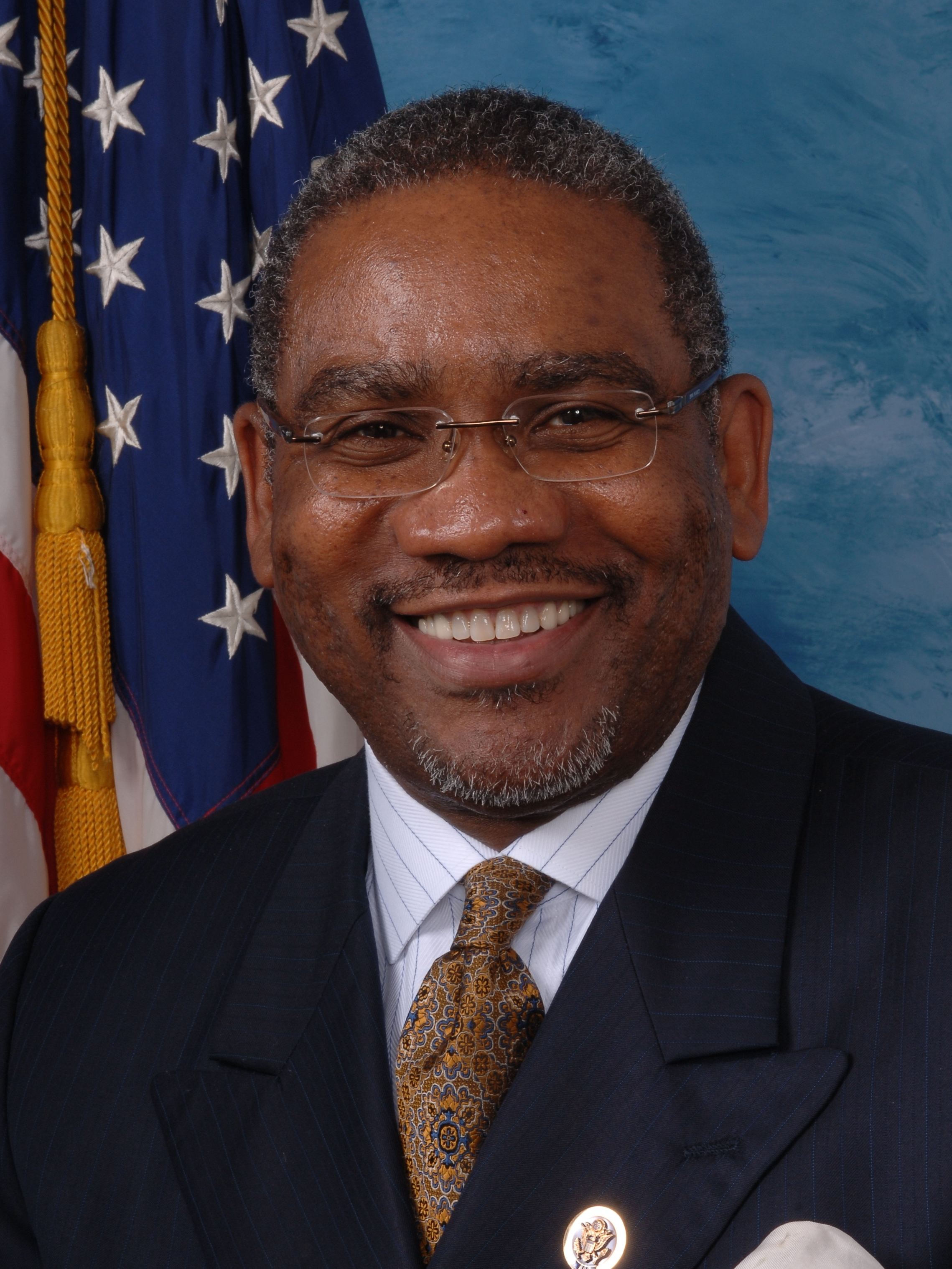
	Majority party
Candidate	Gregory Meeks
Party	Democratic
Alliance	Working Families
Popular vote	75,712
Percentage	95.1%
- County results Meeks: 60–70% 80–90%
U.S. Representative before election
Gregory Meeks
Democratic
Elected U.S. Representative
Gregory Meeks
Democratic

The 5th district was mostly located within Queens in New York City, but also included a small portion of Nassau County. Incumbent Democrat Gregory Meeks, who had represented the district since 2013 and previously represented the 6th district from 1998 to 2013, ran for re-election. He was re-elected in 2012 with 90% of the vote. The district had a PVI of D+35.

=== Democratic primary ===
==== Candidates ====
===== Nominee =====
- Gregory Meeks, incumbent U.S. Representative

===== Eliminated in primary =====
- Joseph Marthone, small-business owner and candidate for this seat in 2012

==== Results ====
Democratic primary results
Party	Candidate	Votes	%
Democratic	Gregory W. Meeks (incumbent)	8,119	80.1
Democratic	Joseph R. Marthone	2,023	19.9
Total votes		10,142	100.0

Meeks also received the Working Families Party nomination.

=== Republican primary ===
==== Candidates ====
No Republicans filed.

=== General election ===
==== Endorsements ====
Gregory Meeks (D)

Labor unions

- International Brotherhood of Boilermakers
- National Association of Letter Carriers

Organizations

- Sierra Club

==== Predictions ====
Source	Ranking	As of
The Cook Political Report	Safe D	November 3, 2014
Rothenberg	Safe D	October 24, 2014
Sabato's Crystal Ball	Safe D	October 30, 2014
RCP	Safe D	November 2, 2014
Daily Kos Elections	Safe D	November 4, 2014

==== Results ====
New York's 5th congressional district, 2014
Party	Candidate	Votes	%
Democratic	Gregory Meeks (incumbent)	75,712	95.1
Allen 4 Congress	Allen F. Steinhardt	3,870	4.9
Total votes		79,582	100.0
Democratic hold			

== District 6 ==
2014 New York's 6th congressional district election
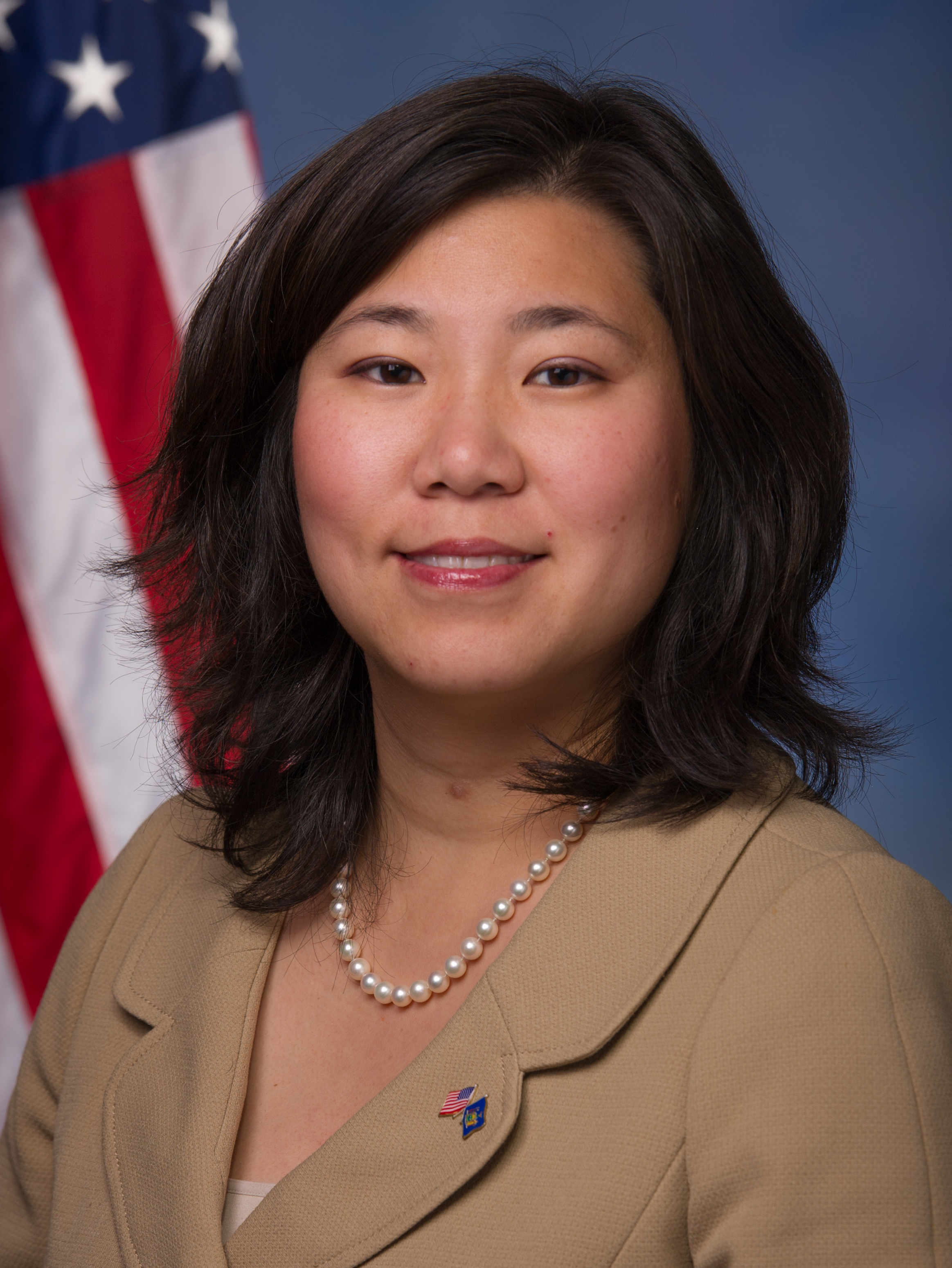
	Majority party
Candidate	Grace Meng
Party	Democratic
Alliance	Working Families
Popular vote	55,368
Percentage	100.0%
- County results Meng: 70–80%
U.S. Representative before election
Grace Meng
Democratic
Elected U.S. Representative
Grace Meng
Democratic

The 6th district is located entirely within Queens in New York City. Incumbent Democrat Grace Meng, who had represented the district since 2013, ran for re-election. She was elected in 2012, winning the Democratic primary with 53% of the vote and the general election with 68% of the vote. The district had a PVI of D+13.

=== Democratic primary ===
==== Candidates ====
===== Nominee =====
- Grace Meng, incumbent U.S. Representative

===== Declined =====
- John Liu, former New York City Comptroller and candidate for Mayor of New York City in 2013 (running for state senate and endorsed Meng)

She also received the Working Families nomination.

=== General election ===
Meng was unopposed for re-election.

==== Endorsements ====
Grace Meng (D)

Labor unions

- AFL-CIO
- International Brotherhood of Boilermakers
- National Association of Letter Carriers

Organizations

- Sierra Club

==== Predictions ====
Source	Ranking	As of
The Cook Political Report	Safe D	November 3, 2014
Rothenberg	Safe D	October 24, 2014
Sabato's Crystal Ball	Safe D	October 30, 2014
RCP	Safe D	November 2, 2014
Daily Kos Elections	Safe D	November 4, 2014

==== Results ====
New York's 6th congressional district, 2014
Party	Candidate	Votes	%
Democratic	Grace Meng	49,227	88.9
Working Families	Grace Meng	6,141	11.1
Total	Grace Meng (incumbent)	55,368	100.0
Total votes		55,368	100.0
Democratic hold			

== District 7 ==
2014 New York's 7th congressional district election
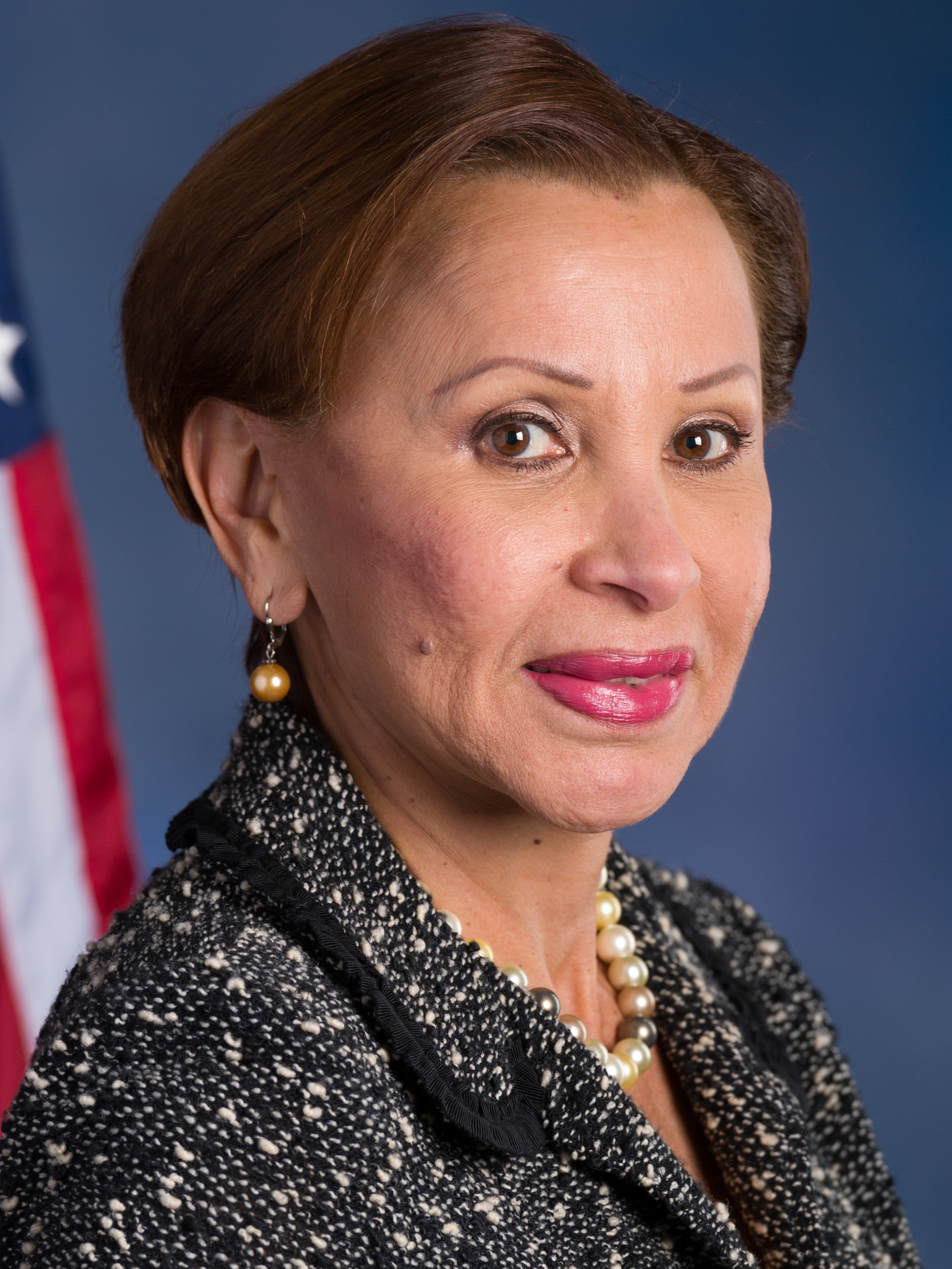

	Majority party	Minority party
Candidate	Nydia Velázquez	Jose Luis Fernandez
Party	Democratic	Republican
Alliance	Working Families
Popular vote	56,593	5,713
Percentage	88.8%	9.0%
- County results Velazquez: 70–80% 80–90% 90–100%
U.S. Representative before election
Nydia Velázquez
Democratic
Elected U.S. Representative
Nydia Velázquez
Democratic

The 7th district is located entirely in New York City and includes parts of Brooklyn, Queens, and Manhattan. Incumbent Democrat Nydia Velázquez, who had represented the district since 2013, and previously represented the 12th district from 1993 to 2013, ran for re-election. She was re-elected in 2012 with 95% of the vote, and the district had a PVI of D+34.

=== Democratic primary ===
==== Candidates ====
===== Nominee =====
- Nydia Velázquez, incumbent U.S. Representative

===== Declined =====
- John Liu, former New York City Comptroller and candidate for Mayor of New York City in 2013

==== Results ====
Democratic primary results
Party	Candidate	Votes	%
Democratic	Nydia M. Velázquez (incumbent)	7,627	80.9
Democratic	Jeffrey M. Kurzon	1,796	19.1
Total votes		9,423	100.0

Velázquez also received the nomination of the Working Families Party.

=== Republican primary ===
==== Candidates ====
===== Nominee =====
- Jose Luis Fernandez

=== Conservative primary ===
==== Candidates ====
===== Nominee =====
- Allan E. Romaguera

=== General election ===
==== Endorsements ====
Nydia Velázquez (D)

Labor unions

- AFL-CIO
- International Brotherhood of Boilermakers
- National Association of Letter Carriers

Organizations

- Sierra Club

==== Predictions ====
Source	Ranking	As of
The Cook Political Report	Safe D	November 3, 2014
Rothenberg	Safe D	October 24, 2014
Sabato's Crystal Ball	Safe D	October 30, 2014
RCP	Safe D	November 2, 2014
Daily Kos Elections	Safe D	November 4, 2014

==== Results ====
New York's 7th congressional district, 2014
Party	Candidate	Votes	%
Democratic	Nydia Velázquez	47,142	74.0
Working Families	Nydia Velázquez	9,451	14.8
Total	Nydia Velázquez (incumbent)	56,593	88.8
Republican	Jose Luis Fernandez	5,713	9.0
Conservative	Allan E. Romaguera	1,398	2.2
Total votes		63,704	100.0
Democratic hold			

== District 8 ==
2014 New York's 8th congressional district election
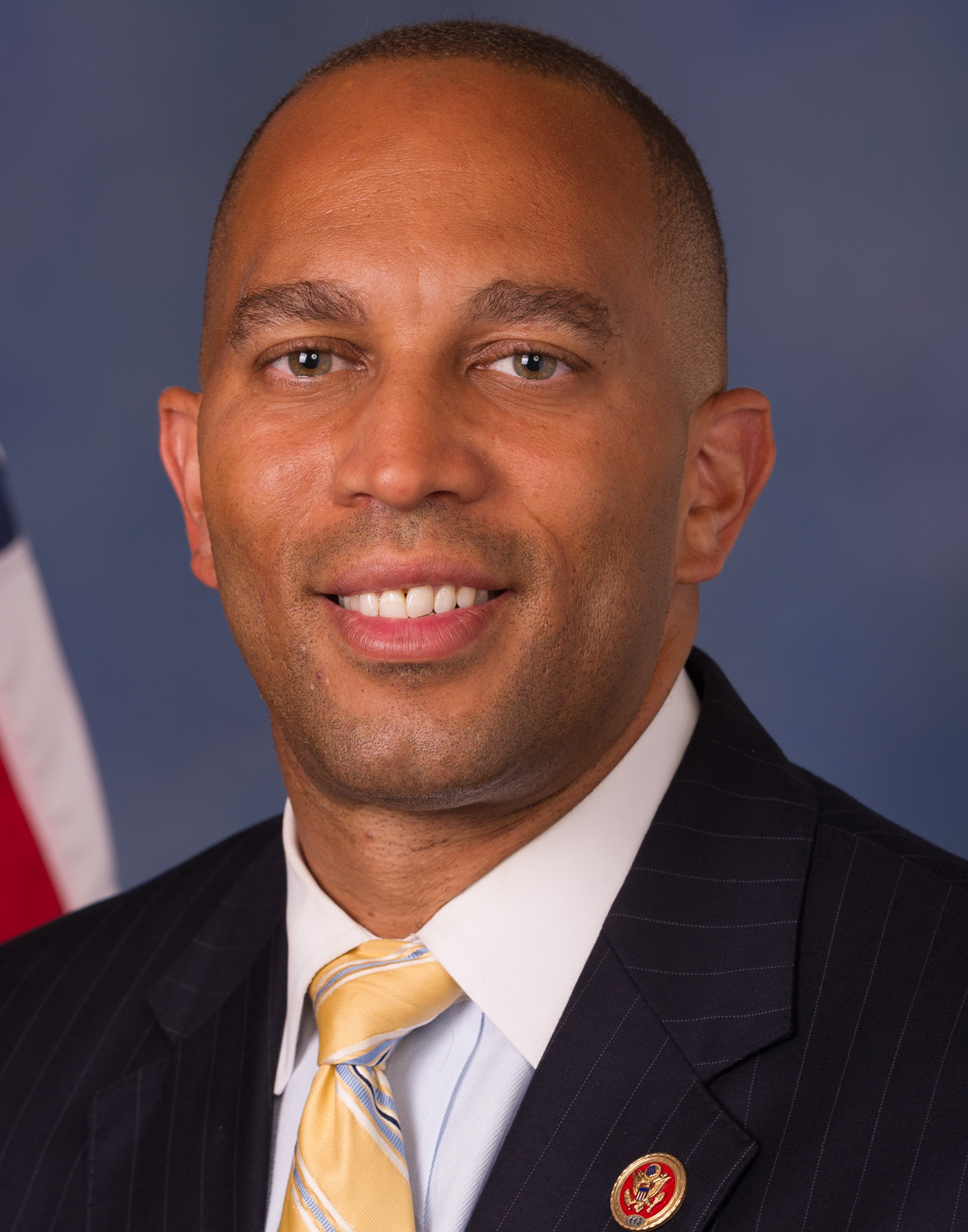

	Majority party	Minority party
Candidate	Hakeem Jeffries	Alan Bellone
Party	Democratic	Conservative
Alliance	Working Families
Popular vote	77,255	6,673
Percentage	92.1%	7.9%
- County results Jeffries: 40–50% 80–90%
U.S. Representative before election
Hakeem Jeffries
Democratic
Elected U.S. Representative
Hakeem Jeffries
Democratic

The 8th district is located entirely in the New York City boroughs of Brooklyn and Queens. Incumbent Democrat Hakeem Jeffries, who had represented the district since 2013, ran for re-election. He was elected in 2012, winning the Democratic primary with 71% of the vote and the general election with 90% of the vote, succeeding retiring Democrat Edolphus Towns. The district had a PVI of D+35.

=== Democratic primary ===
==== Candidates ====
===== Nominee =====
- Hakeem Jeffries, incumbent U.S. Representative

Jeffries also received the Working Families nomination.

=== Republican primary ===
No Republicans filed.

=== Conservative primary ===
==== Candidates ====
===== Nominee =====
- Alan Bellone, businessman, Republican nominee for the State Assembly in 2008 and 2010 and nominee for this seat in 2012

=== General election ===
==== Endorsements ====
Hakeem Jeffries (D)

Labor unions

- AFL-CIO
- International Brotherhood of Boilermakers
- National Association of Letter Carriers

Organizations

- Progressive Change Campaign Committee
- Sierra Club

==== Predictions ====
Source	Ranking	As of
The Cook Political Report	Safe D	November 3, 2014
Rothenberg	Safe D	October 24, 2014
Sabato's Crystal Ball	Safe D	October 30, 2014
RCP	Safe D	November 2, 2014
Daily Kos Elections	Safe D	November 4, 2014

==== Results ====
New York's 8th congressional district, 2014
Party	Candidate	Votes	%
Democratic	Hakeem Jeffries	70,469	84.0
Working Families	Hakeem Jeffries	6,786	8.1
Total	Hakeem Jeffries (incumbent)	77,255	92.1
Conservative	Alan Bellone	6,673	7.9
Total votes		83,928	100.0
Democratic hold			

== District 9 ==
2014 New York's 9th congressional district election
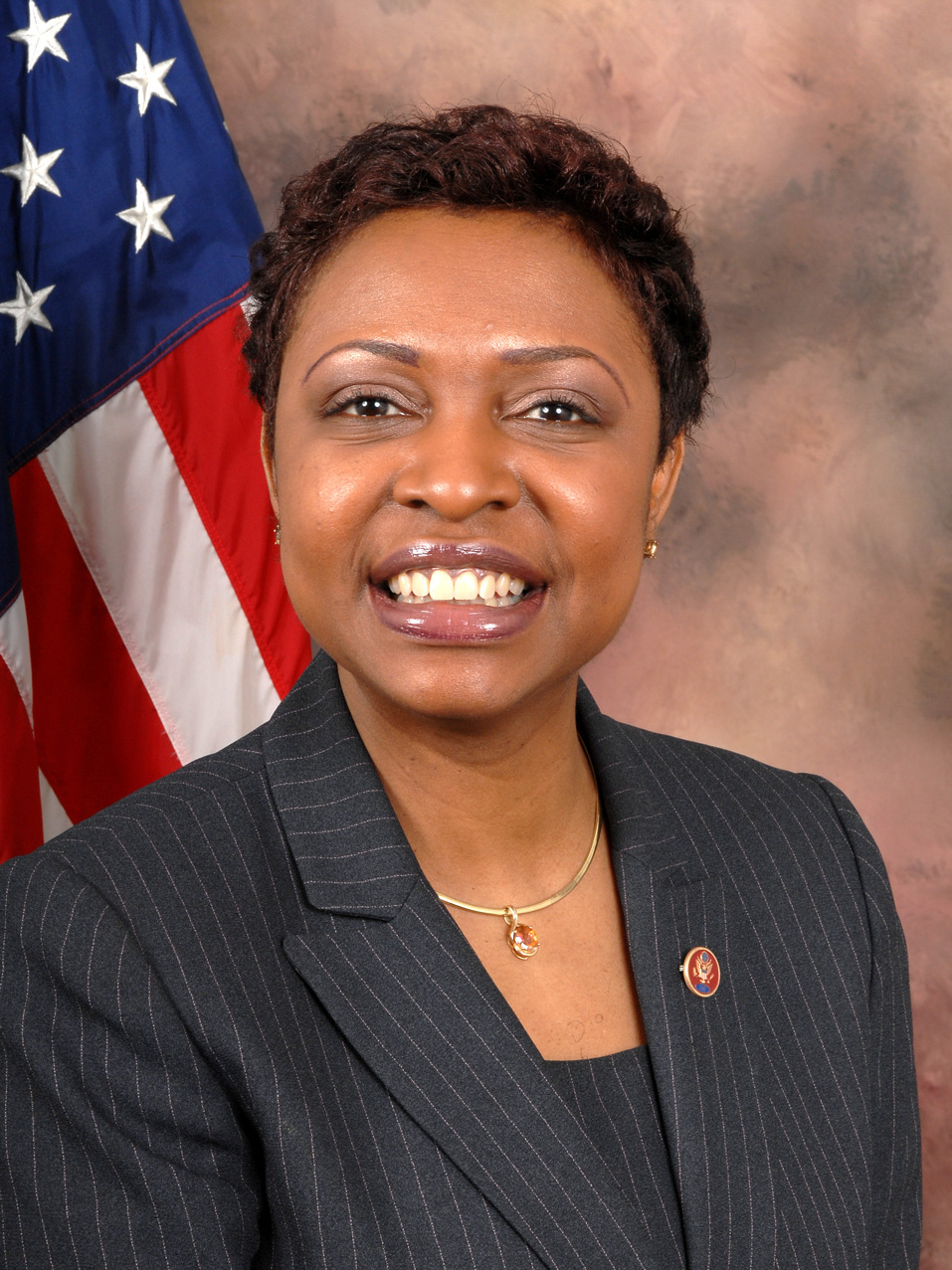

	Majority party	Minority party
Candidate	Yvette Clarke	Daniel J. Cavanagh
Party	Democratic	Conservative
Alliance	Working Families
Popular vote	82,659	9,727
Percentage	89.5%	10.5%
- County results Clarke: 80–90%
U.S. Representative before election
Yvette Clarke
Democratic
Elected U.S. Representative
Yvette Clarke
Democratic

The 9th district is located entirely within the New York City borough of Brooklyn. Incumbent Democrat Yvette Clarke, who had represented the district since 2013 and previously represented the 11th district from 2007 to 2013, ran for re-election. She was re-elected in 2012 with 87% of the vote, and the district had a PVI of D+32.

=== Democratic primary ===
==== Candidates ====
===== Nominee =====
- Yvette Clarke, incumbent U.S. Representative

Clarke also received the Working Families nomination.

=== Republican primary ===
No Republicans filed.

=== Conservative primary ===
==== Candidates ====
===== Nominee =====
- Daniel J. Cavanagh, Republican nominee for this seat in 2012

=== General election ===
==== Endorsements ====
Yvette Clarke (D)

Labor unions

- AFL-CIO
- International Brotherhood of Boilermakers
- National Association of Letter Carriers

Organizations

- Sierra Club

==== Predictions ====
Source	Ranking	As of
The Cook Political Report	Safe D	November 3, 2014
Rothenberg	Safe D	October 24, 2014
Sabato's Crystal Ball	Safe D	October 30, 2014
RCP	Safe D	November 2, 2014
Daily Kos Elections	Safe D	November 4, 2014

==== Results ====
New York's 9th congressional district, 2014
Party	Candidate	Votes	%
Democratic	Yvette Clarke	70,997	76.9
Working Families	Yvette Clarke	11,662	12.6
Total	Yvette Clarke (incumbent)	82,659	89.5
Conservative	Daniel J. Cavanagh	9,727	10.5
Total votes		92,386	100.0
Democratic hold			

== District 10 ==
2014 New York's 10th congressional district election
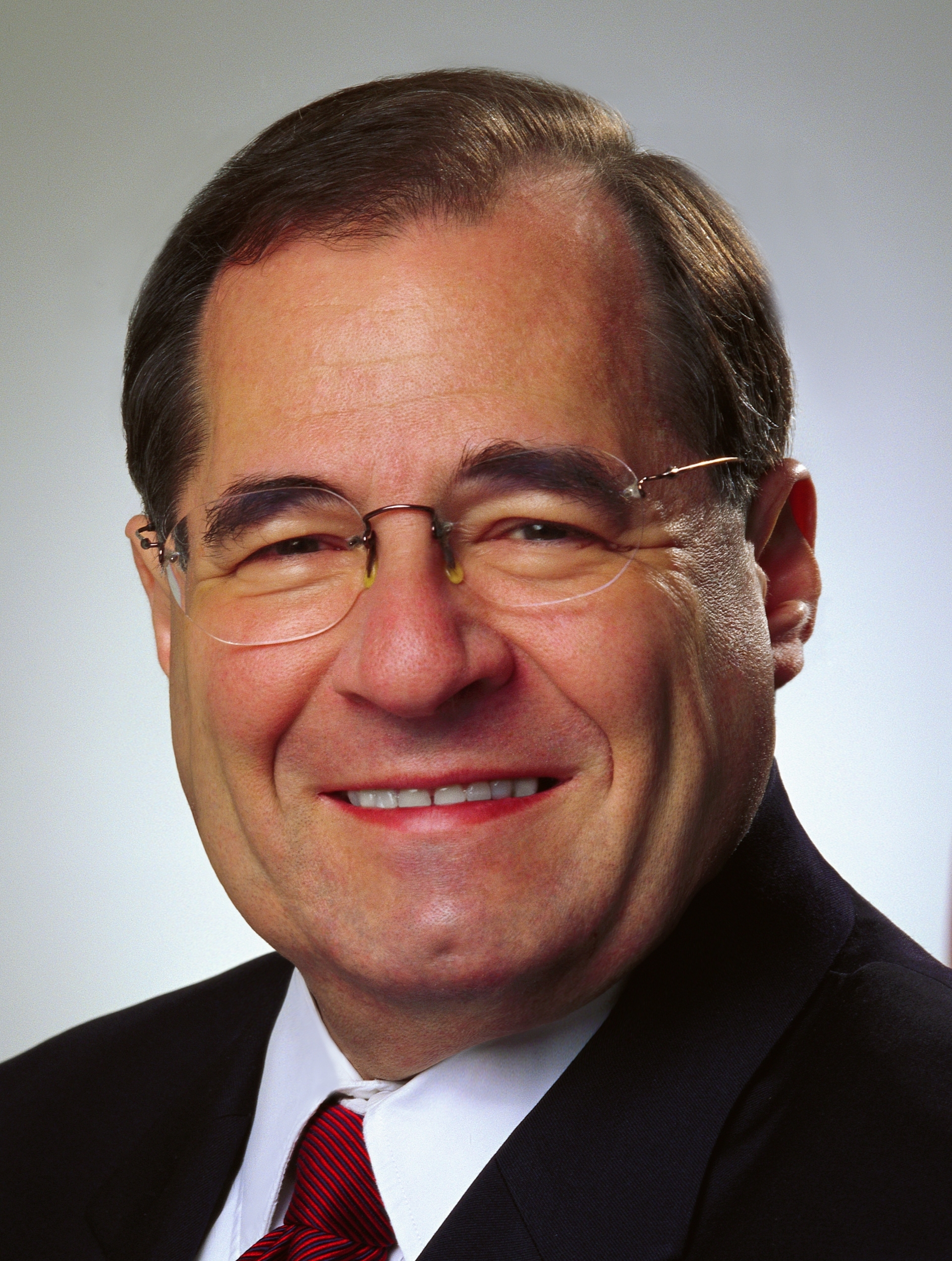

	Majority party	Minority party
Candidate	Jerrold Nadler	Ross Brady
Party	Democratic	Conservative
Alliance	Working Families
Popular vote	89,080	12,042
Percentage	87.6%	11.8%
- County results Nadler: 60–70% 80–90%
U.S. Representative before election
Jerrold Nadler
Democratic
Elected U.S. Representative
Jerrold Nadler
Democratic

The 10th district is located in New York City and includes the Upper West Side of Manhattan, the west side of Lower Manhattan, including Greenwich Village and the Financial District, and parts of Brooklyn, including Borough Park. Incumbent Democrat Jerrold Nadler, who had represented the district since 2013 and previously represented the 8th district from 1993 to 2013 and the 17th district from 1992 to 1993, ran for re-election. He was re-elected in 2012 with 90% of the vote, and the district had a PVI of D+23.

=== Democratic primary ===
==== Candidates ====
===== Nominee =====
- Jerrold Nadler, incumbent U.S. Representative

Nadler also received the Working Families nomination.

=== Republican primary ===
No Republicans filed.

=== Conservative primary ===
==== Candidates ====
===== Nominee =====
- Ross Brady, former Republican nominee for the State Assembly, former Conservative nominee for the state senate and the State Supreme Court

=== General election ===
==== Endorsements ====
Jerrold Nadler (D)

Labor unions

- AFL-CIO
- International Brotherhood of Boilermakers
- National Association of Letter Carriers

Organizations

- Sierra Club

==== Predictions ====
Source	Ranking	As of
The Cook Political Report	Safe D	November 3, 2014
Rothenberg	Safe D	October 24, 2014
Sabato's Crystal Ball	Safe D	October 30, 2014
RCP	Safe D	November 2, 2014
Daily Kos Elections	Safe D	November 4, 2014

==== Results ====
New York's 10th congressional district, 2014
Party	Candidate	Votes	%
Democratic	Jerrold Nadler	73,945	72.7
Working Families	Jerrold Nadler	15,135	14.9
Total	Jerrold Nadler (incumbent)	89,080	87.6
Conservative	Ross Brady	12,042	11.8
Flourish Every Person	Michael J. Dilger	554	0.6
Total votes		101,676	100.0
Democratic hold			

== District 11 ==
2014 New York's 11th congressional district election
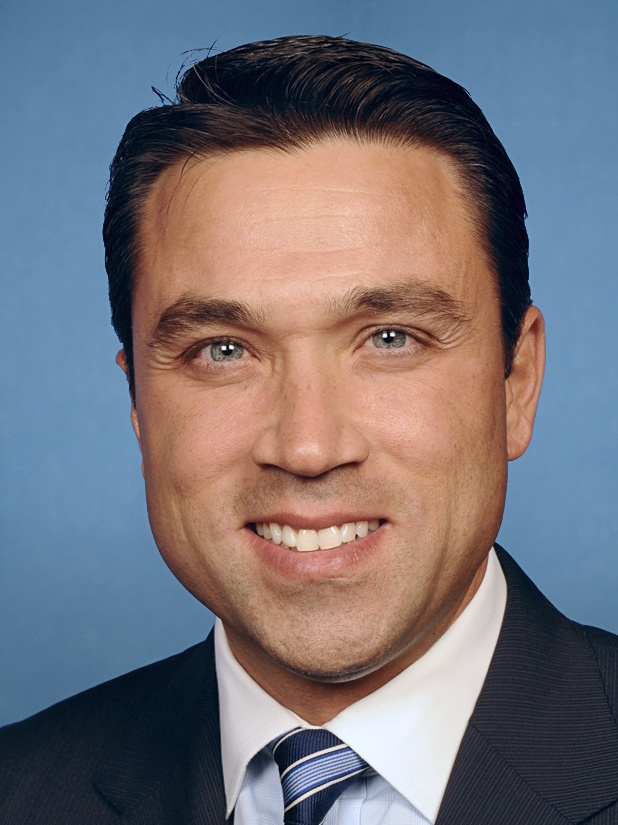

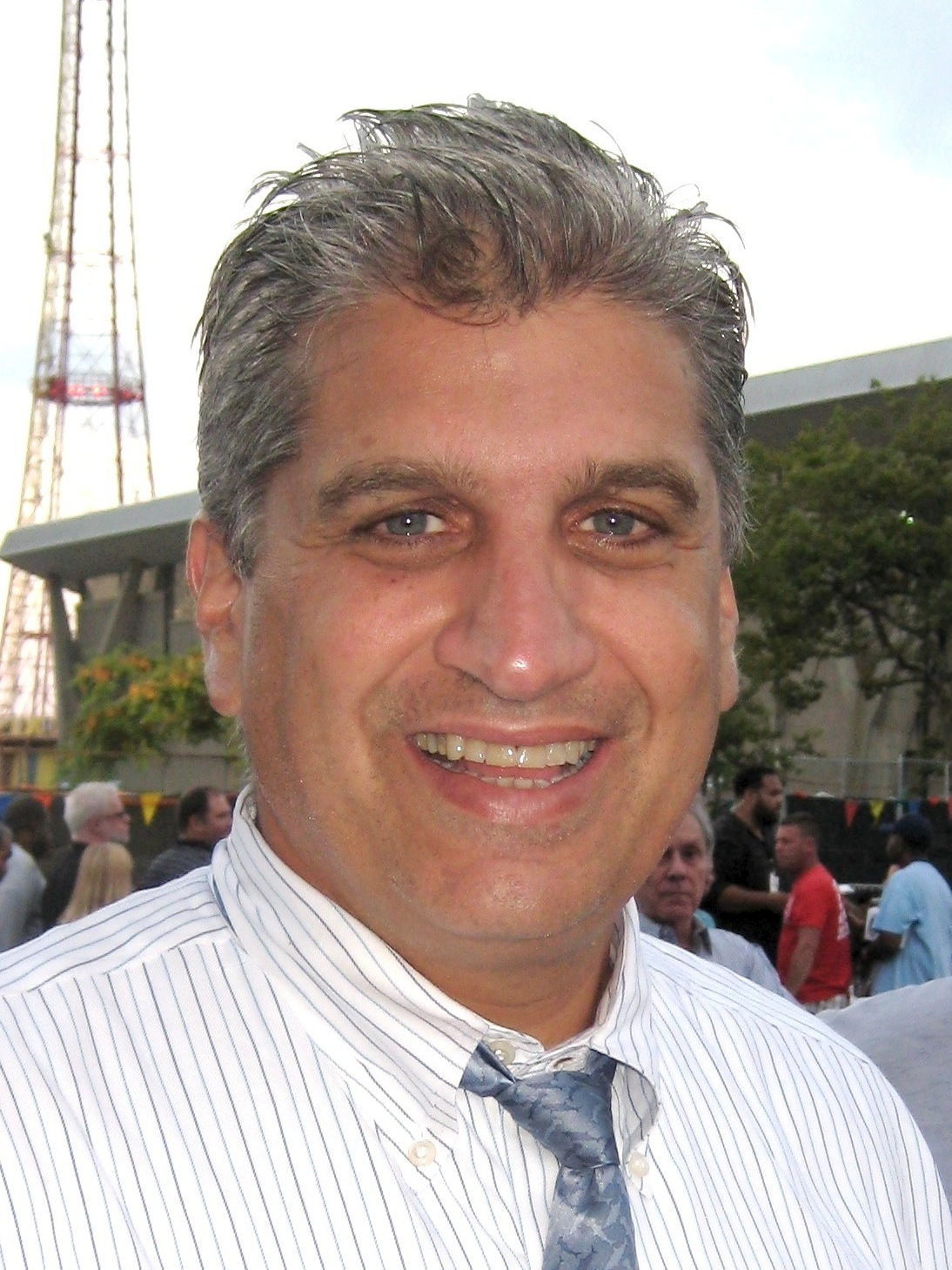
	Majority party	Minority party
Candidate	Michael Grimm	Domenic Recchia
Party	Republican	Democratic
Alliance	Conservative; Independence	Working Families
Popular vote	58,886	45,244
Percentage	55.1%	42.4%
- County results Domenic M. Recchia: 50–60% Grimm: 50–60%
U.S. Representative before election
Michael Grimm
Republican
Elected U.S. Representative
Michael Grimm
Republican

The 11th district is located entirely in New York City and includes all of Staten Island and parts of southern Brooklyn. Incumbent Republican Michael Grimm, who had represented the district since 2011, ran for re-election. The district had a PVI of R+2.

=== Republican primary ===
On April 25, two weeks after the filing deadline, Grimm was indicted on charges including mail fraud and wire fraud due to a campaign finance investigation from his successful run for the 13th district in 2010. The only way he could have been removed from the ballot was by moving out of the state, running for a judgeship or being convicted before the general election. If Grimm had been removed from the ballot, potential Republican candidates included former U.S. Representative Vito Fossella, State Senator Andrew Lanza, State Assemblywoman Nicole Malliotakis, State Assemblyman Joseph Borelli, former state assemblyman Matthew Mirones, Richmond County District Attorney and nominee for New York Attorney General in 2010 Daniel M. Donovan, Jr., Staten Island Borough President James Oddo, New York City Council Minority Leader Vincent M. Ignizio and New York City Councilman Steven Matteo.

==== Candidates ====
===== Nominee =====
- Michael Grimm, incumbent U.S. Representative

==== Results ====
Grimm, however, remained on the ballot and received the Republican, Conservative and Independence Party nominations.

=== Democratic primary ===
==== Candidates ====
===== Nominee =====
- Domenic Recchia, former member of the New York City Council

===== Disqualified =====
- Erick Salgado, pastor of the Church of Iglesia Jovenes Cristianos and candidate for mayor of New York City in 2013

===== Declined =====
- Michael Cusick, state assembly member
- Michael McMahon, former U.S. Representative
- Debi Rose, former New York City Council member
- Diane Savino, state senator
- Matthew Titone, state assembly member

==== Results ====
Recchia won the Democratic nomination unopposed, after Salgado was removed from the ballot after failing to file enough nominating petition signatures. He also received the Working Families nomination.

=== General election ===
==== Campaign ====
Despite running against a recently indicted opponent, Recchia and his campaign made a series of errors, some of which received national attention. He was criticized for being unable to explain his position on trade and labor issues, as well as seemingly not understanding what the Trans-Pacific Partnership was. The following day he stated that he had “great knowledge” of foreign affairs, by citing his experience in running a school exchange program more than a decade earlier and trips he had taken to Italy.

These events prompted Jon Stewart to dedicate a segment of The Daily Show to the 11th district's campaign, entitled “Wait, How the F@#k Does That Happen?”, in which he mocked Recchia for his repeated verbal flubs.

In its editorial endorsing Grimm, the New York Daily News described Recchia as "a candidate so dumb, ill-informed, evasive and inarticulate that voting for a thuggish Republican who could wind up in a prison jumpsuit starts to make rational sense".

==== Endorsements ====
Michael Grimm (R)

Labor unions

- International Brotherhood of Boilermakers
- National Association of Letter Carriers

Organizations

- National Republican Congressional Committee "Patriot" Program
- National Right to Life Committee

Newspapers

- New York Daily News
- Staten Island Advance
Domenic Recchia (D)

Labor unions

- AFL-CIO
- Retail, Wholesale and Department Store Union
- United Food and Commercial Workers

Organizations

- Democratic Congressional Campaign Committee "Red to Blue" Program
- Sierra Club

==== Debate ====
2014 New York's 11th congressional district debate
No.	Date	Host	Moderator	Link	Republican	Democratic
Key: P Participant A Absent N Not invited I Invited W Withdrawn						
Key: P Participant A Absent N Not invited I Invited W Withdrawn					Michael Grimm	Domenic Recchia
1	Oct. 17, 2014	WABC-TV	Diana Williams		P	P

==== Polling ====
Poll source	Date(s) administered	Sample size	Margin of error	Michael Grimm (R)	Domenic Recchia (D)	Henry Bardel (G)	Undecided
Siena College	October 26–28, 2014	713	± 3.7%	53%	34%	5%	7%
New York Times/CBS News Battleground Tracker	October 16–23, 2014	275	± 10.0%	42%	39%	1%	18%
GBA Strategies (D-Recchia)	September 2014	400	± 4.9%	46%	46%	—	8%
Siena College	September 9–14, 2014	585	± 4%	44%	40%	4%	12%

Hypothetical polling

Poll source	Date(s) administered	Sample size	Margin of error	Michael Grimm (R)	Generic Democrat	Undecided
Public Policy Polling (D)	October 3–4, 2013	646	± ?	45%	46%	9%

==== Predictions ====
Source	Ranking	As of
The Cook Political Report	Lean R	November 3, 2014
Rothenberg	Tilt R	October 24, 2014
Sabato's Crystal Ball	Lean R	October 30, 2014
RCP	Tossup	November 2, 2014
Daily Kos Elections	Lean R	November 4, 2014

==== Results ====
On election night, Grimm easily won a third term, defeating Recchia by nearly 13%, declaring in his victory speech that "It's not how hard you can hit, it's how hard you can get hit and keep moving forward. That's how winning is done". Due to his losing to an indicted congressman in a swing district by double figures, The Hill named Recchia as one of their "Top 10 worst candidates of 2014".

New York's 11th congressional district, 2014
Party	Candidate	Votes	%
Republican	Michael Grimm	48,291	45.2
Conservative	Michael Grimm	8,251	7.7
Independence	Michael Grimm	2,344	2.2
Total	Michael Grimm (incumbent)	58,886	55.1
Democratic	Domenic M. Recchia, Jr.	41,429	38.8
Working Families	Domenic M. Recchia, Jr.	3,815	3.6
Total	Domenic M. Recchia, Jr.	45,244	42.4
Green	Henry J. Bardel	2,687	2.5
Total votes		106,817	100.0
Republican hold			

=== Aftermath ===
On December 23, Grimm pled guilty to one charge of felony tax evasion. He initially refused to resign, but on December 29 confirmed that he would resign from Congress on January 5. A special election to replace him was held on May 5, 2015.

On July 17, 2015, Grimm was sentenced to eight months in prison. He surrendered on September 22, 2015, ultimately serving seven months before being released on May 20, 2016.

== District 12 ==
2014 New York's 12th congressional district election
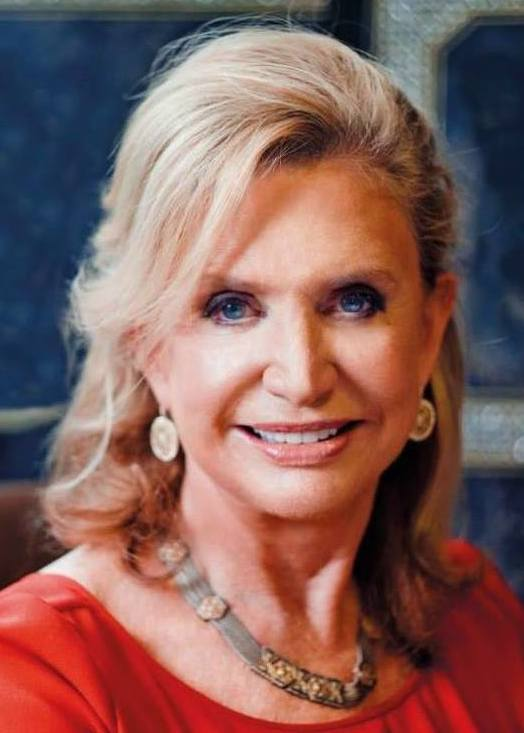

	Majority party	Minority party
Candidate	Carolyn Maloney	Nicholas S. Di Iorio
Party	Democratic	Republican
Alliance	Working Families	Conservative; Independence
Popular vote	90,603	22,731
Percentage	79.9%	20.1%
- County results Maloney: 70–80% 80–90%
U.S. Representative before election
Carolyn Maloney
Democratic
Elected U.S. Representative
Carolyn Maloney
Democratic

The 12th district is located entirely in New York City and includes several neighborhoods in the East Side of Manhattan, Greenpoint and western Queens. Incumbent Democrat Carolyn Maloney, who had represented the district since 2013, and previously represented the 14th district from 1993 to 2013, ran for re-election. She was re-elected in 2012 with 80% of the vote, and the district had a PVI of D+27.

=== Democratic primary ===
==== Candidates ====
===== Nominee =====
- Carolyn Maloney, incumbent U.S. Representative

Maloney also received the Working Families nomination.

=== Republican primary ===
==== Candidates ====
===== Nominee =====
- Nicholas Di Iorio

Di Iorio also received the Conservative and Independence Party nominations.

=== General election ===
==== Endorsements ====
Carolyn Maloney (D)

Labor unions

- AFL-CIO
- International Brotherhood of Boilermakers
- National Association of Letter Carriers

Organizations

- Everytown for Gun Safety
- Sierra Club

==== Predictions ====
Source	Ranking	As of
The Cook Political Report	Safe D	November 3, 2014
Rothenberg	Safe D	October 24, 2014
Sabato's Crystal Ball	Safe D	October 30, 2014
RCP	Safe D	November 2, 2014
Daily Kos Elections	Safe D	November 4, 2014

==== Results ====
New York's 12th congressional district, 2014
Party	Candidate	Votes	%
Democratic	Carolyn Maloney	78,440	69.2
Working Families	Carolyn Maloney	12,163	10.7
Total	Carolyn Maloney (incumbent)	90,603	79.9
Republican	Nicholas S. Di Iorio	19,564	17.3
Conservative	Nicholas S. Di Iorio	1,841	1.6
Independence	Nicholas S. Di Iorio	1,326	1.2
Total	Nicholas S. Di Iorio	22,731	20.1
Total votes		113,334	100.0
Democratic hold			

== District 13 ==
2014 New York's 13th congressional district election
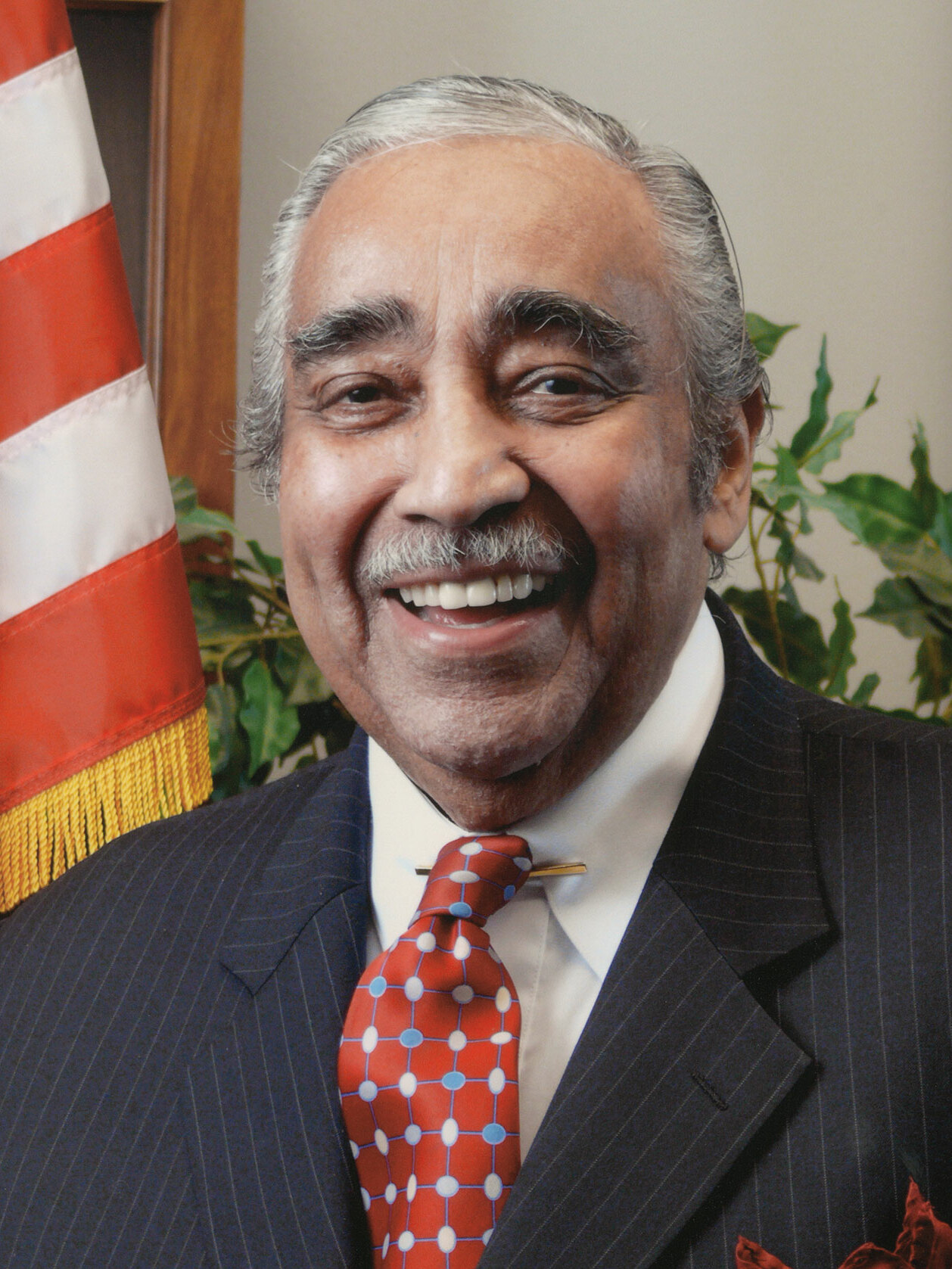

	Majority party	Minority party
Candidate	Charles Rangel	Daniel Vila Rivera
Party	Democratic	Green
Alliance	Working Families
Popular vote	68,396	9,806
Percentage	87.5%	12.5%
- County results Rangel: 70–80%
U.S. Representative before election
Charles Rangel
Democratic
Elected U.S. Representative
Charles Rangel
Democratic

The 13th district is located entirely in New York City and includes Upper Manhattan and a small portion of the western Bronx. Incumbent Democrat Charles Rangel, who had represented the district since 2013, after previously representing the 15th district since 1993, ran for re-election. The district had a PVI of D+42.

=== Democratic primary ===
==== Candidates ====
===== Nominee =====
- Charles Rangel, incumbent U.S. Representative

===== Eliminated in primary =====
- Adriano Espaillat, state senator and candidate for this seat in 2012
- Yolanda Garcia, community activist
- Michael Walrond, Jr., pastor

===== Declined =====
- Calvin O. Butts, pastor
- David Paterson, former Governor
- Adam Clayton Powell IV, former state assembly member and candidate for this seat in 1994 & 2010
- Keith Wright, state assembly member

==== Polling ====
Poll source	Date(s) administered	Sample size	Margin of error	Charlie Rangel	Adriano Espaillat	Yolonda Garcia	Mike Walrond	Other	Undecided
Siena College	June 14–18, 2014	707	± 3.7%	47%	34%	4%	7%	–	8%
Siena College	May 15–20, 2014	678	± 3.8%	41%	32%	5%	6%	1%	15%

==== Results ====
2014 Democratic primary results by precinct Rangel: 40–50%; 50–60%; 60–70%; 70–80%; 80–90%; Espaillat: 40–50%; 50–60%; 60–70%; 70–80%; 80–90%; 90–100%; Walrond, Jr.: 40–50%; Tie 40–50% No votes Interactive map version

Democratic primary results
Party	Candidate	Votes	%
Democratic	Charles B. Rangel (incumbent)	23,799	47.8
Democratic	Adriano Espaillat	21,477	43.1
Democratic	Michael A. Walrond, Jr.	3,954	7.9
Democratic	Yolanda Garcia	597	1.2
Total votes		49,827	100.0

Daniel Vila Rivera received the Green Party nomination. Kenneth D. Schaeffer, a candidate for the State Supreme Court in 2005 and 2010, received the Working Families Party nomination, until he was removed from the ballot shortly before the election, allowing Rangel to run on the Working Families Party line.

=== General election ===
==== Endorsements ====
Charles Rangel (D)

Labor unions

- AFL-CIO
- International Brotherhood of Boilermakers
- National Association of Letter Carriers

Organizations

- J Street
- Sierra Club

==== Polling ====
Poll source	Date(s) administered	Sample size	Margin of error	Charlie Rangel (D)	Daniel Vila Rivera (G)	Kennith D. Schaeffer (WF)	Undecided
New York Times/CBS News Battleground Tracker	October 16–23, 2014	71	± 17%	35%	44%	1%	20%

==== Predictions ====
Source	Ranking	As of
The Cook Political Report	Safe D	November 3, 2014
Rothenberg	Safe D	October 24, 2014
Sabato's Crystal Ball	Safe D	October 30, 2014
RCP	Safe D	November 2, 2014
Daily Kos Elections	Safe D	November 4, 2014

==== Results ====
New York's 13th congressional district, 2014
Party	Candidate	Votes	%
Democratic	Charles B. Rangel	63,437	81.1
Working Families	Kennith D. Schaeffer	4,959	6.4
Total	Charles Rangel (Incumbent)	68,396	87.5
Green	Daniel Vila Rivera	9,806	12.5
Total votes		78,202	100.0
Democratic hold			

== District 14 ==
2014 New York's 14th congressional district election
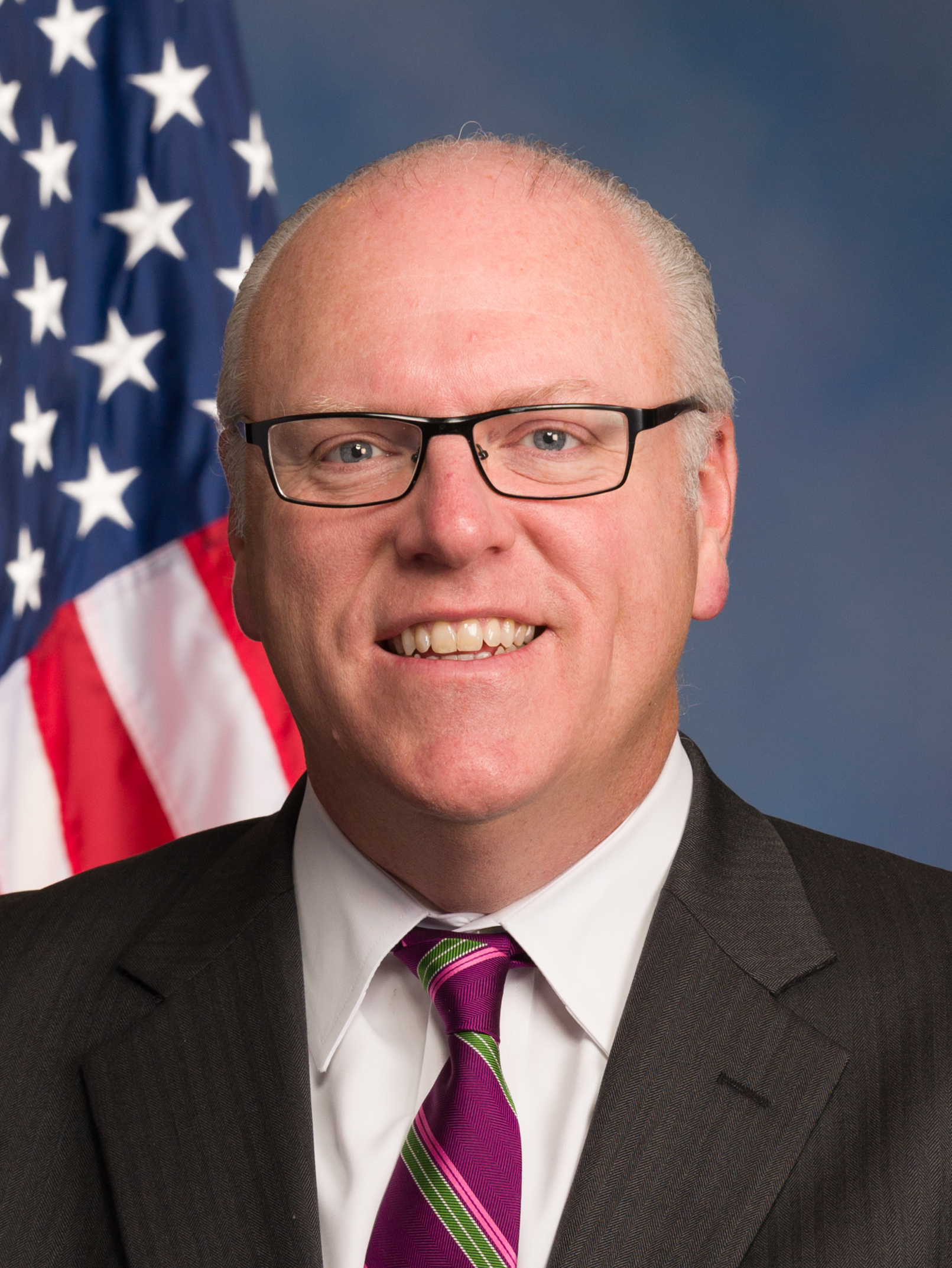

	Majority party	Minority party
Candidate	Joseph Crowley	Elizabeth Perri
Party	Democratic	Conservative
Alliance	Working Families
Popular vote	50,352	6,735
Percentage	88.2%	11.8%
- County results Crowley: 70–80%
U.S. Representative before election
Joseph Crowley
Democratic
Elected U.S. Representative
Joseph Crowley
Democratic

The 14th district is located in New York City and includes the eastern Bronx and part of north-central Queens. Incumbent Democrat, Joseph Crowley, who had represented the district since 2013, and previously represented the 7th district from 1999 to 2013, ran for re-election. He was re-elected in 2012 with 83% of the vote, and the district had a PVI of D+26.

=== Democratic primary ===
==== Candidates ====
===== Nominee =====
- Joseph Crowley, incumbent U.S. Representative

Crowley also received the Working Families nomination.

=== Conservative primary ===
==== Candidates ====
===== Nominee =====
- Elizabeth Perri, nominee for the state senate in 2012 and the Republican nominee for Bronx borough president in 2013

=== General election ===
==== Endorsements ====
Joseph Crowley (D)

Labor unions

- AFL-CIO
- International Brotherhood of Boilermakers
- National Association of Letter Carriers

Organizations

- Sierra Club

==== Predictions ====
Source	Ranking	As of
The Cook Political Report	Safe D	November 3, 2014
Rothenberg	Safe D	October 24, 2014
Sabato's Crystal Ball	Safe D	October 30, 2014
RCP	Safe D	November 2, 2014
Daily Kos Elections	Safe D	November 4, 2014

==== Results ====
New York's 14th congressional district, 2014
Party	Candidate	Votes	%
Democratic	Joseph Crowley	45,370	79.5
Working Families	Joseph Crowley	4,982	8.7
Total	Joseph Crowley (incumbent)	50,352	88.2
Conservative	Elizabeth Perri	6,735	11.8
Total votes		57,087	100.0
Democratic hold			

== District 15 ==
2014 New York's 15th congressional district election
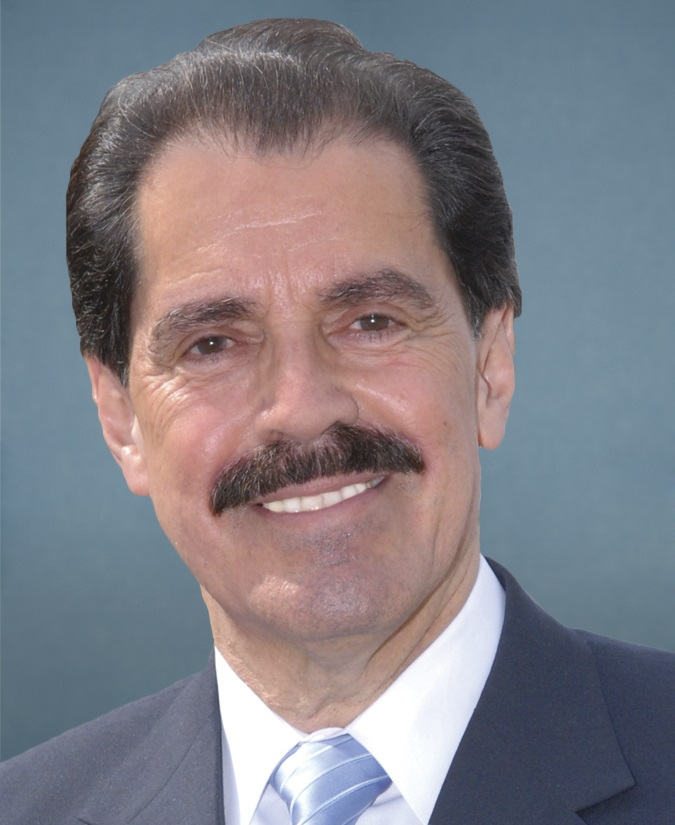
	Majority party
Candidate	José E. Serrano
Party	Democratic
Alliance	Working Families
Popular vote	54,906
Percentage	97.1%
- County results Serrano: 80–90%
U.S. Representative before election
José E. Serrano
Democratic
Elected U.S. Representative
José E. Serrano
Democratic

The 15th district is located entirely within The Bronx in New York City and is the smallest district by area in the entire country. Incumbent Democrat, José E. Serrano, who had represented the district since 2013, and previously represented the 16th district from 1993 to 2013 and the 18th district from 1990 to 1993, ran for re-election. He was re-elected in 2012 with 97% of the vote, and the district had a PVI of D+43.

=== Democratic primary ===
==== Candidates ====
===== Nominee =====
- José E. Serrano, incumbent U.S. Representative

===== Eliminated in primary =====
- Sam Sloan, chess player and perennial candidate

===== Declined =====
- Rubén Díaz Sr., state senator
- Annabel Palma, New York City Council member

==== Results ====
Democratic primary results
Party	Candidate	Votes	%
Democratic	Jose E. Serrano (incumbent)	10,346	91.9
Democratic	Sam Sloan	1,004	8.8
Total votes		11,350	100.0

Serrano also received the Working Families nomination.

=== Conservative primary ===
==== Candidates ====
===== Nominee =====
- Eduardo Ramirez, candidate for the State Assembly in 2012 and the New York City Council in 2013

=== Green primary ===
==== Candidates ====
===== Nominee =====
- William Edstrom, candidate for the State Assembly in 2012

=== General election ===
==== Endorsements ====
Jose Serrano (D)

Labor unions

- AFL-CIO
- International Brotherhood of Boilermakers
- National Association of Letter Carriers

Organizations

- Everytown for Gun Safety
- Sierra Club

==== Predictions ====
Source	Ranking	As of
The Cook Political Report	Safe D	November 3, 2014
Rothenberg	Safe D	October 24, 2014
Sabato's Crystal Ball	Safe D	October 30, 2014
RCP	Safe D	November 2, 2014
Daily Kos Elections	Safe D	November 4, 2014

==== Results ====
New York's 15th congressional district, 2014
Party	Candidate	Votes	%
Democratic	Jose E. Serrano	53,128	94.0
Working Families	Jose E. Serrano	1,778	3.1
Total	Jose E. Serrano (incumbent)	54,906	97.1
Conservative	Eduardo Ramirez	1,047	1.9
Green	William Edstrom	568	1.0
Total votes		56,521	100.0
Democratic hold			

== District 16 ==
2014 New York's 16th congressional district election
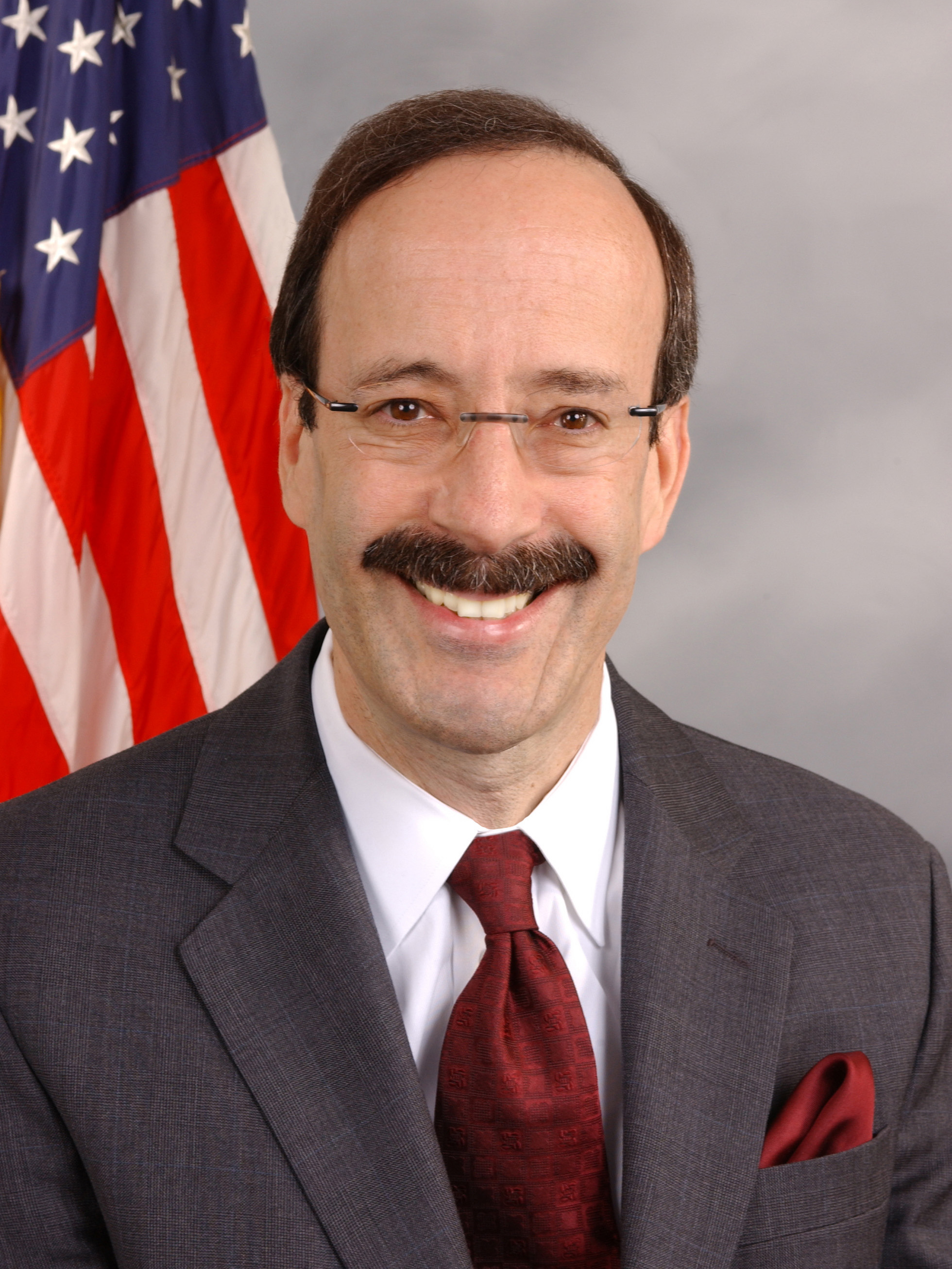
	Majority party
Candidate	Eliot Engel
Party	Democratic
Alliance	Working Families
Popular vote	99,658
Percentage	100.0%
- County results Engel: 60–70% 80–90%
U.S. Representative before election
Eliot Engel
Democratic
Elected U.S. Representative
Eliot Engel
Democratic

The 16th district is located in the northern part of The Bronx and the southern half of Westchester County, including the cities of Mount Vernon, Yonkers and Rye. Incumbent Democrat Eliot Engel, who had represented the district since 2013, and previously represented the 17th district from 1993 to 2013 and the 19th district from 1989 to 1993, ran for re-election. He was re-elected in 2012 with 76% of the vote, and the district had a PVI of D+21.

=== Democratic primary ===
==== Candidates ====
===== Nominee =====
- Eliot Engel, incumbent U.S. Representative

Engel also received the nomination of the Working Families party.

=== Conservative primary ===
Patrick A. McManus, perennial candidate for office, was the Conservative nominee, but the board rejected his petition as invalid, taking him off of the ballot for the primary election.

=== General election ===
==== Endorsements ====
Eliot Engel (D)

Labor unions

- AFL-CIO
- International Brotherhood of Boilermakers
- National Association of Letter Carriers

Organizations

- Sierra Club

==== Predictions ====
Source	Ranking	As of
The Cook Political Report	Safe D	November 3, 2014
Rothenberg	Safe D	October 24, 2014
Sabato's Crystal Ball	Safe D	October 30, 2014
RCP	Safe D	November 2, 2014
Daily Kos Elections	Safe D	November 4, 2014

==== Results ====
New York's 16th congressional district, 2014
Party	Candidate	Votes	%
Democratic	Eliot Engel	90,088	90.4
Working Families	Eliot Engel	9,570	9.6
Total	Eliot Engel (incumbent)	99,658	100.0
Total votes		99,658	100.0
Democratic hold			

== District 17 ==
2014 New York's 17th congressional district election
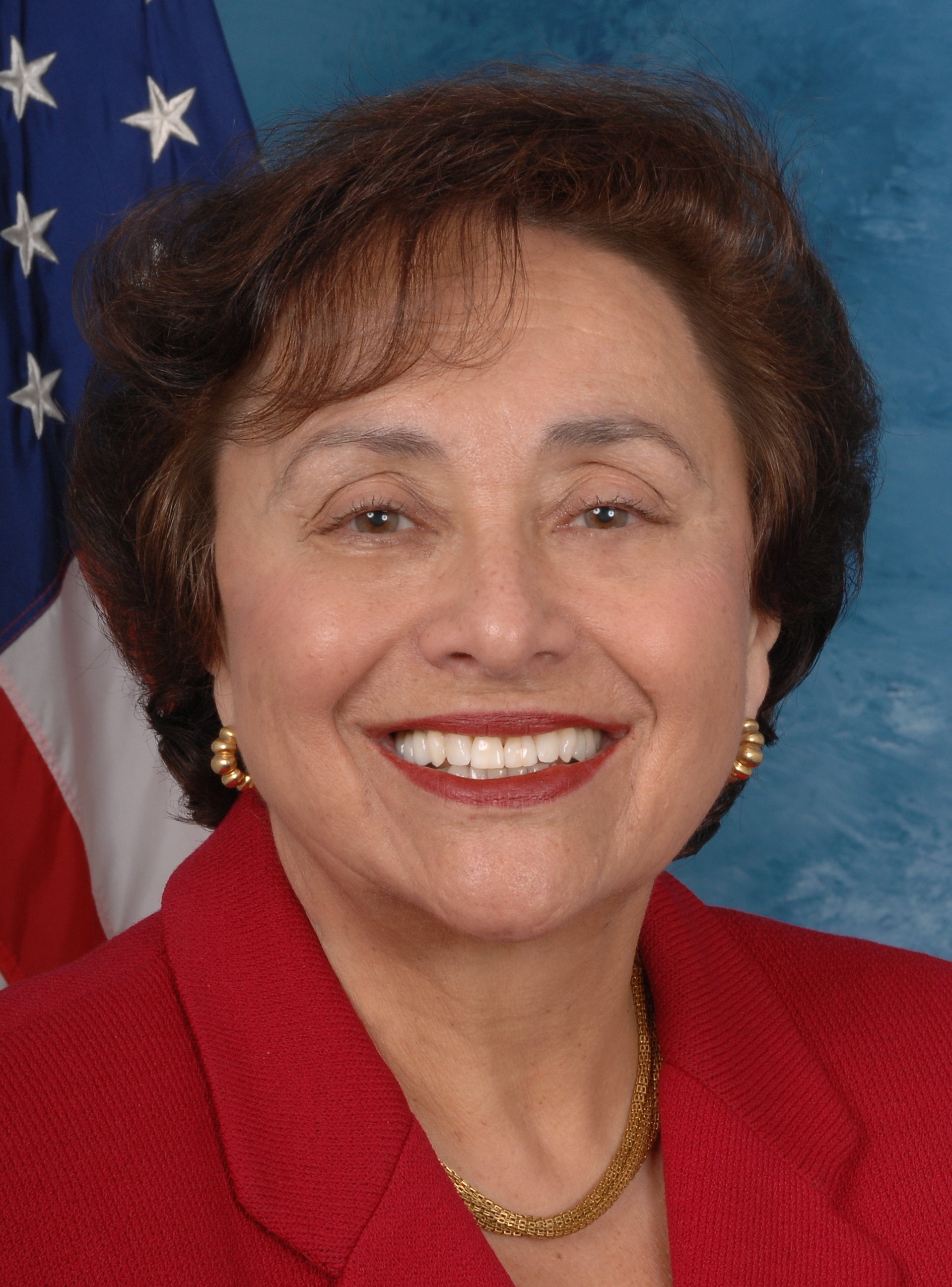

	Majority party	Minority party
Candidate	Nita Lowey	Christopher Day
Party	Democratic	Republican
Alliance	Working Families	Conservative
Popular vote	98,150	75,781
Percentage	56.4%	43.6%
- County results Lowey: 50–60%
U.S. Representative before election
Nita Lowey
Democratic
Elected U.S. Representative
Nita Lowey
Democratic

The 17th district contains all of Rockland County and the northern and central portions of Westchester County, including the cities of Peekskill and White Plains. Incumbent Democrat Nita Lowey, who had represented the district since 2013, and previously represented the 18th district from 1993 to 2013 and the 20th district from 1989 to 1993, ran for re-election. She was re-elected in 2012 with 64% of the vote, and the district had a PVI of D+5.

=== Democratic primary ===
==== Candidates ====
===== Nominee =====
- Nita Lowey, incumbent U.S. Representative

Lowey also received the Working Families Party nomination.

=== Republican primary ===
==== Candidates ====
===== Nominee =====
- Chris Day, Afghanistan/Iraq army veteran and private equity/venture capital investment professional

=== General election ===
==== Campaign ====
The Independence Party line was not active in this election after Lowey's ballot access petitions were rejected by the Board of Elections.

==== Endorsements ====
Nita Lowey (D)

Labor unions

- AFL-CIO
- International Brotherhood of Boilermakers
- National Association of Letter Carriers

Organizations

- Everytown for Gun Safety
- Sierra Club

==== Polling ====
Poll source	Date(s) administered	Sample size	Margin of error	Nita Lowey (D)	Christopher Day (R)	Undecided
New York Times/CBS News Battleground Tracker	October 16–23, 2014	124	± 11.0%	61%	37%	3%

==== Predictions ====
Source	Ranking	As of
The Cook Political Report	Safe D	November 3, 2014
Rothenberg	Safe D	October 24, 2014
Sabato's Crystal Ball	Safe D	October 30, 2014
RCP	Safe D	November 2, 2014
Daily Kos Elections	Safe D	November 4, 2014

==== Results ====
New York's 17th congressional district, 2014
Party	Candidate	Votes	%
Democratic	Nita Lowey	89,295	51.3
Working Families	Nita Lowey	8,855	5.1
Total	Nita Lowey (incumbent)	98,150	56.4
Republican	Christopher Day	63,549	36.6
Conservative	Christopher Day	12,232	7.0
Total	Christopher Day	75,781	43.6
Total votes		173,931	100.0
Democratic hold			

== District 18 ==
2014 New York's 18th congressional district election
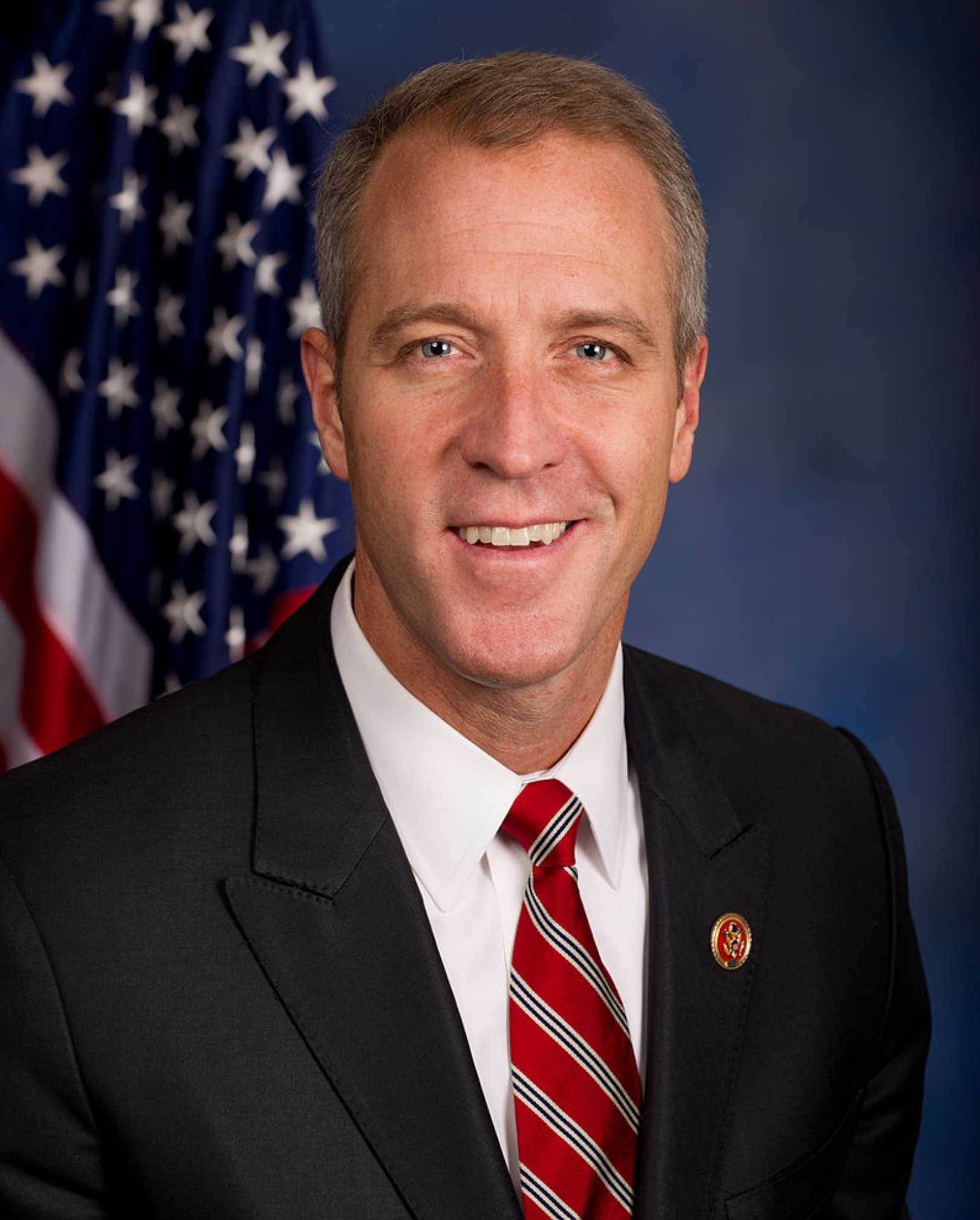

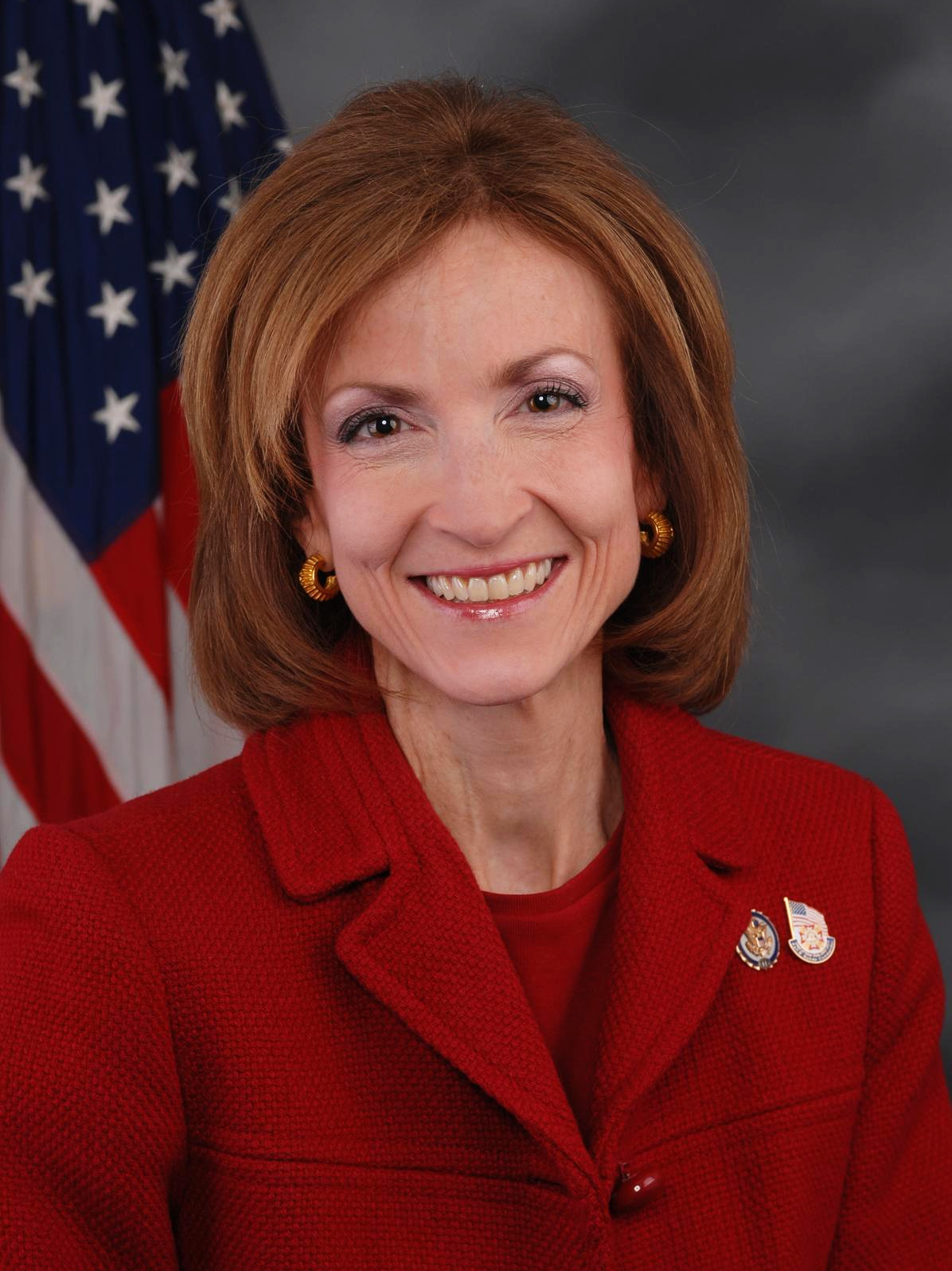
	Majority party	Minority party
Candidate	Sean Patrick Maloney	Nan Hayworth
Party	Democratic	Republican
Alliance	Working Families	Conservative; Independence
Popular vote	88,993	85,660
Percentage	49.7%	47.9%
- County results Maloney: 40–50% 50–60% Hayworth: 50–60%
U.S. Representative before election
Sean Patrick Maloney
Democratic
Elected U.S. Representative
Sean Patrick Maloney
Democratic

The 18th district is located in the northern suburbs and exurbs of New York City and includes all of Orange and Putnam counties, as well as parts of southern Dutchess and northeastern Westchester counties. Incumbent Democrat Sean Patrick Maloney, who had represented the district since 2013, ran for re-election. He was elected in 2012, defeating Republican incumbent Nan Hayworth with 52% of the vote, and the district had an even PVI.

=== Democratic primary ===
==== Candidates ====
===== Nominee =====
- Sean Patrick Maloney, incumbent U.S. Representative

Maloney also received the Working Families Party nomination.

=== Republican primary ===
Hayworth sought a rematch with Maloney. State Senator Greg Ball declined to seek the Republican nomination, praising Maloney in a statement: "We have a great working relationship and he and his office are to be applauded, for they have bent over backwards to mutually assist shared constituents."

==== Candidates ====
===== Nominee =====
- Nan Hayworth, former U.S. Representative

===== Disqualified =====
- Andre Barnett, businessman and Reform nominee for president of the United States in 2012

===== Declined =====
- Greg Ball, state senator

Hayworth also received the Conservative and Independence Party nomination.

=== Independence primary ===
==== Results ====
Independence primary results
Party	Candidate	Votes	%
Independence	Nan Hayworth	780	53.4
Independence	Sean Patrick Maloney (incumbent)	682	46.6
Total votes		1,462	100.0

=== General election ===
==== Campaign ====
Ball formally endorsed Maloney in September 2014, praising his work on veterans' issues. Another Republican state senator, Bill Larkin, also cited veterans' issues as the reason for his endorsing Maloney.

==== Endorsements ====
Sean Patrick Maloney (D)

State legislators

- Greg Ball, state senator (R)

Labor unions

- AFL-CIO
- International Brotherhood of Boilermakers
- National Association of Letter Carriers

Organizations

- Democratic Congressional Campaign Committee "Frontline" Program
- Everytown for Gun Safety
- J Street
Nan Hayworth (R)

Organizations

- National Republican Congressional Committee "Young Guns" Program
- National Rifle Association - Political Victory Fund

==== Debates ====
- Complete video of debate, October 16, 2014

==== Polling ====
Poll source	Date(s) administered	Sample size	Margin of error	Sean Patrick Maloney (D)	Nan Hayworth (R)	Scott Smith (I)	Undecided
Siena College	October 24–27, 2014	682	± 3.8%	49%	44%	—	7%
Public Opinion Strategies (R-Hayworth)	October 23–25, 2014	400	± 4.9%	42%	42%	3%	13%
New York Times/CBS News Battleground Tracker	October 16–23, 2014	344	± 8.0%	49%	41%	0%	10%
Siena College	October 15–16, 2014	253	± 4%	41%	52%	—	8%
Public Opinion Strategies (R-Hayworth)	October 12–13, 2014	400	± 4.9%	43%	39%	2%	16%
Gravis Marketing	September 2014	601	± 4%	46%	40%	—	15%
Siena College	September 12–17, 2014	590	± 4%	50%	42%	—	8%
Gravis Marketing	July 17–19, 2014	523	± 4%	40%	44%	—	16%

==== Predictions ====
Source	Ranking	As of
The Cook Political Report	Tossup	November 3, 2014
Rothenberg	Lean D	October 24, 2014
Sabato's Crystal Ball	Lean D	October 30, 2014
RCP	Lean D	November 2, 2014
Daily Kos Elections	Lean D	November 4, 2014

==== Results ====
New York's 18th congressional district, 2014
Party	Candidate	Votes	%
Democratic	Sean Patrick Maloney	76,235	42.6
Working Families	Sean Patrick Maloney	12,758	7.1
Total	Sean Patrick Maloney (incumbent)	88,993	49.7
Republican	Nan Hayworth	66,523	37.2
Conservative	Nan Hayworth	15,714	8.8
Independence	Nan Hayworth	3,423	1.9
Total	Nan Hayworth	85,660	47.9
Independent	Scott A. Smith	4,294	2.4
Total votes		178,947	100.0
Democratic hold			

== District 19 ==
2014 New York's 19th congressional district election
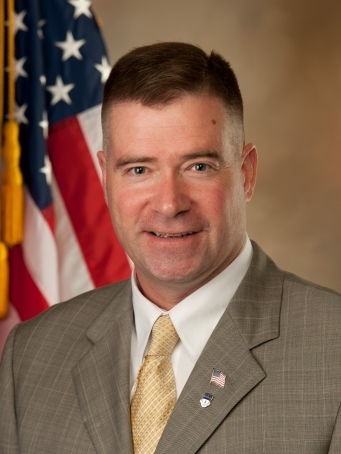

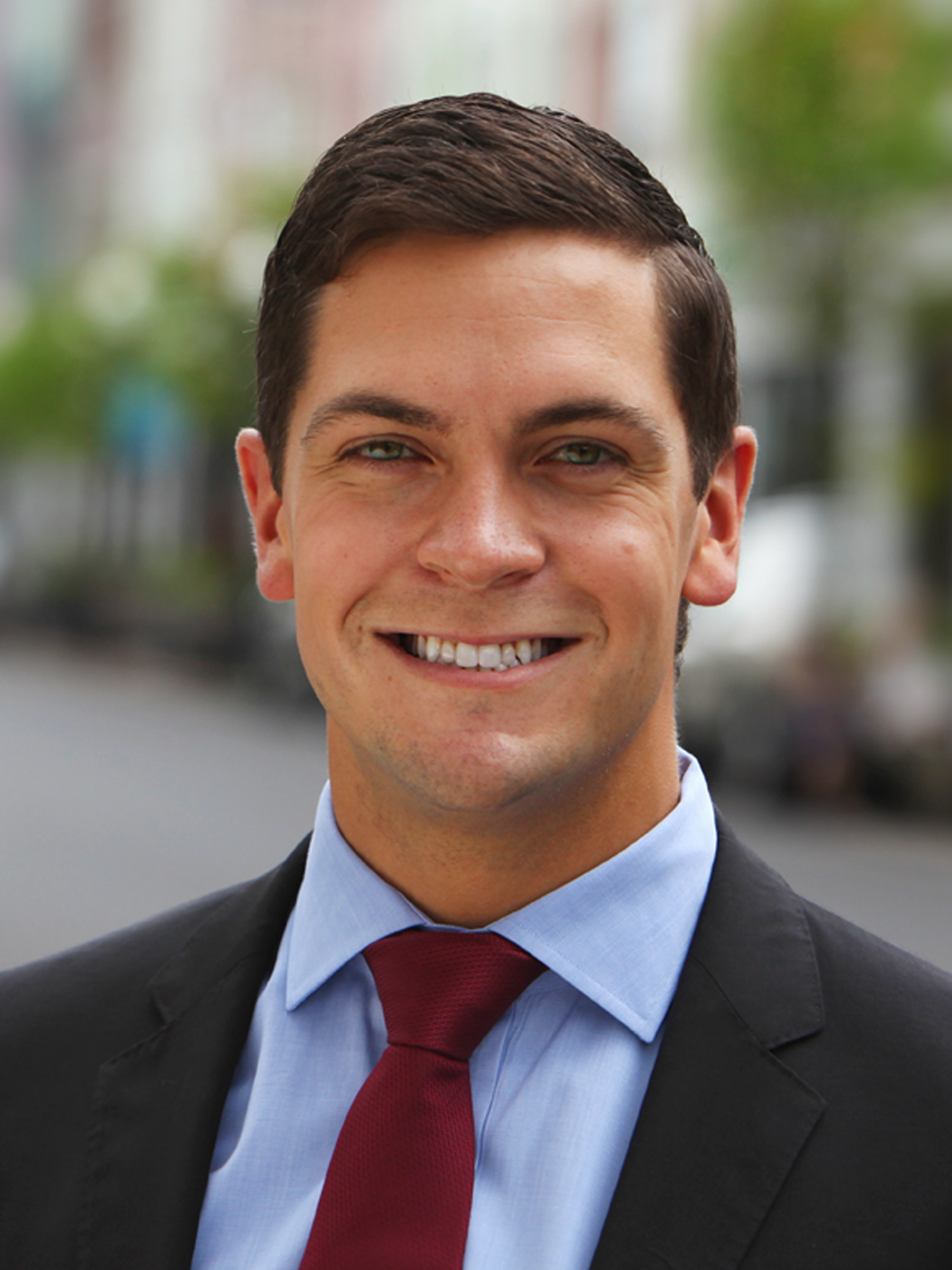
Nominee	Chris Gibson	Sean Eldridge
Party	Republican	Democratic
Alliance	Conservative; Independence	Working Families
Popular vote	131,594	72,470
Percentage	64.5%	35.5%
- County results Gibson: 50–60% 60–70% 70–80%
U.S. Representative before election
Chris Gibson
Republican
Elected U.S. Representative
Chris Gibson
Republican

The 19th district is located in New York's Hudson Valley and Catskills regions and includes all of Columbia, Delaware, Greene, Otsego, Schoharie, Sullivan and Ulster counties, and parts of Broome, Dutchess, Montgomery and Rensselaer counties. Incumbent Republican Chris Gibson, who had represented the district since 2013, and previously represented the 20th district from 2011 to 2013, ran for re-election. He was re-elected in 2012 with 53% of the vote, and the district had a PVI of D+1.

=== Republican primary ===
==== Candidates ====
===== Nominee =====
- Chris Gibson, incumbent U.S. Representative

Gibson also received the Conservative and Independence Party nominations.

=== Democratic primary ===
==== Candidates ====
===== Nominee =====
- Sean Eldridge, investment fund president and political activist

Eldridge also received the Working Families nomination.

=== General election ===
==== Campaign ====
Eldridge faced criticism for not living in the district, having only purchased a $2 million home with his husband Chris Hughes in 2013. They had previously bought a home $5 million in Garrison, New York, in preparation for a run for the 18th district, changing plans after Sean Patrick Maloney's victory in 2012. This prompted one local resident to describe his campaign to the New York Times as "It's a little bit presumptuous, in a community like this you like to know who your neighbors are. Having ties to your neighbors is important. How can he expect to represent people he doesn't know?" The NRCC responded, "The DCCC's prized candidate Sean Eldridge may have Nancy Pelosi on speed dial and close to a billion dollars at his disposal, but he knows absolutely nothing about the struggles and needs of the hard working families in the 19th District of New York."

By October 2014, with Eldridge having spent $2.8 million of his money on the campaign and being down by more than 20 points in the polls, the New York Times described him as "a first-time Democratic candidate with a thin résumé and a thick wallet"; Politico called his campaign a "catastrophe"; and Vanity Fair opined that his campaign was "overfunded and stacked with expensive consultants".

==== Endorsements ====
Chris Gibson (R)

Labor unions

- International Brotherhood of Boilermakers
- National Association of Letter Carriers

Organizations

- BIPAC
- National Republican Congressional Committee "Patriot" Program
- National Rifle Association - Political Victory Fund
- No Labels
Sean Eldridge (D)

Organizations

- Democratic Congressional Campaign Committee "Red to Blue" Program
- J Street
- Sierra Club

==== Debates ====
- Complete video of debate, October 22, 2014

==== Polling ====
Poll source	Date(s) administered	Sample size	Margin of error	Chris Gibson (R)	Sean Eldridge (D)	Undecided
Siena College	October 22–24, 2014	727	± 3.6%	58%	35%	7%
New York Times/CBS News Battleground Tracker	October 16–23, 2014	364	± 7.0%	53%	34%	12%
Public Opinion Strategies (R-Gibson)	October 14–15, 2014	400	± 4.9%	56%	30%	14%
Siena College	September 4, 7–9, 2014	609	± 4%	57%	33%	10%
DFM Research	July 7–12, 2014	405	± 4.9%	56%	29%	15%

Hypothetical polling

Poll source	Date(s) administered	Sample size	Margin of error	Chris Gibson (R)	Generic Democrat	Undecided
Public Policy Polling	October 3–4, 2013	897	± ?	42%	48%	11%

==== Predictions ====
Source	Ranking	As of
The Cook Political Report	Likely R	November 3, 2014
Rothenberg	Safe R	October 24, 2014
Sabato's Crystal Ball	Likely R	October 30, 2014
RCP	Likely R	November 2, 2014
Daily Kos Elections	Likely R	November 4, 2014

==== Results ====
On election day Gibson defeated Eldridge by 29 points, despite having been outspent nearly 3-to-1 in a district President Obama won by 6 percentage points. The Hill named Eldridge as one of their "Top 10 worst candidates of 2014".

New York's 19th congressional district, 2014
Party	Candidate	Votes	%
Republican	Chris Gibson	102,118	50.1
Conservative	Chris Gibson	20,420	10.0
Independence	Chris Gibson	9,056	4.4
Total	Chris Gibson (incumbent)	131,594	64.5
Democratic	Sean Eldridge	60,533	29.7
Working Families	Sean Eldridge	11,937	5.8
Total	Sean Eldridge	72,470	35.5
Total votes		204,064	100.0
Republican hold			

== District 20 ==
2014 New York's 20th congressional district election
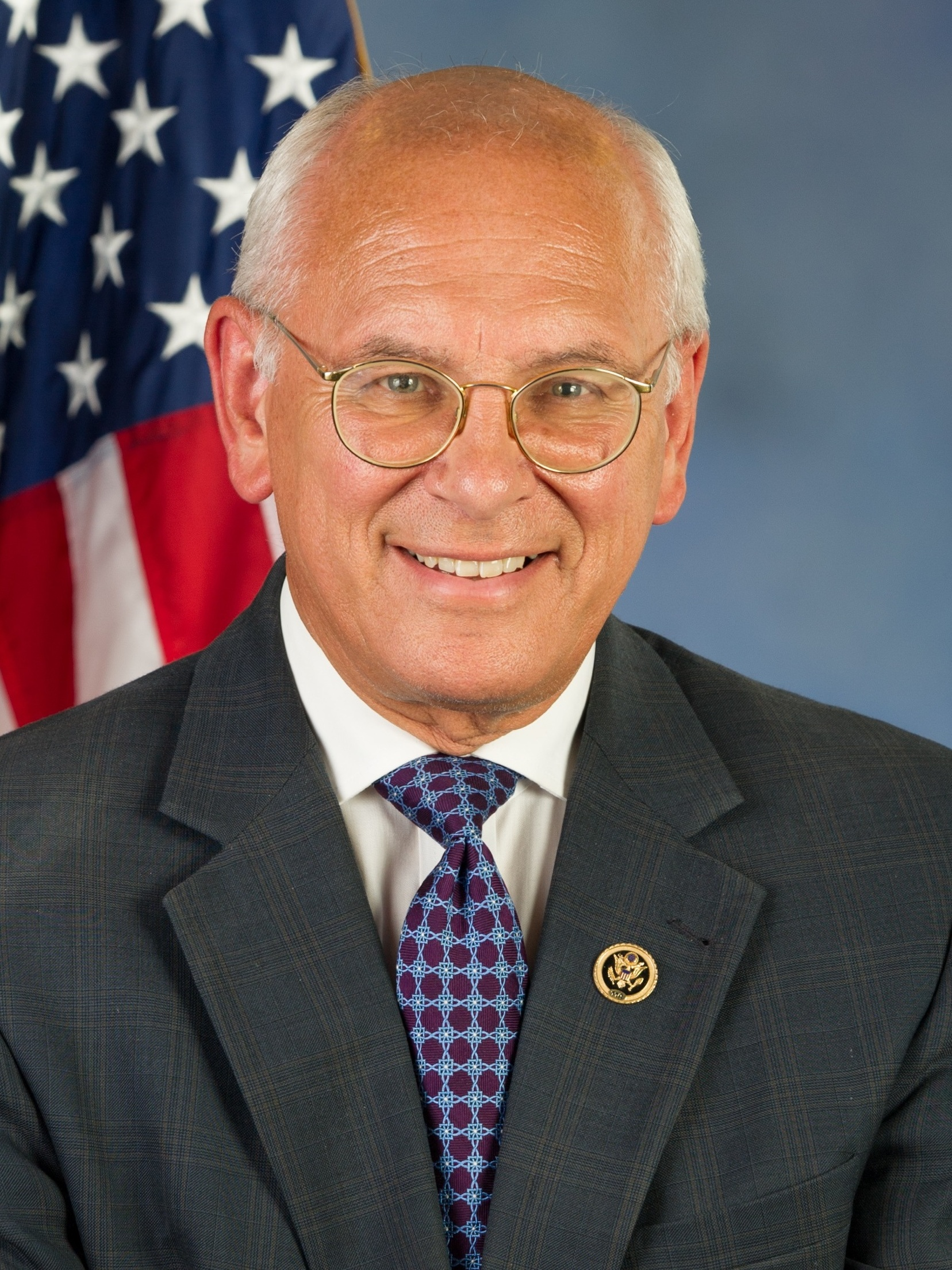

	Majority party	Minority party
Candidate	Paul Tonko	James Fischer
Party	Democratic	Republican
Alliance	Working Families; Independence	Conservative
Popular vote	125,111	79,104
Percentage	61.3%	38.7%
- County results Tonko: 50–60% 60–70%
U.S. Representative before election
Paul Tonko
Democratic
Elected U.S. Representative
Paul Tonko
Democratic

The 20th district is located in the Capital District and includes all of Albany and Schenectady counties, and portions of Montgomery, Rensselear and Saratoga counties. The incumbent is Democrat Paul Tonko, who had represented the district since 2013, and previously represented the 21st district from 2009 to 2013, ran for re-election. He was re-elected in 2012 with 68% of the vote, and the district had a PVI of D+7.

=== Democratic primary ===
==== Candidates ====
===== Nominee =====
- Paul Tonko, incumbent U.S. Representative

Tonko also received the Working Families and Independence Party nominations.

=== Republican primary ===
==== Candidates ====
===== Nominee =====
- Jim Fischer, businessman

Fischer also received the Conservative Party nomination.

=== General election ===
==== Endorsements ====
Paul Tonko (D)

Labor unions

- AFL-CIO
- International Brotherhood of Boilermakers
- National Association of Letter Carriers

Organizations

- J Street
- Sierra Club

==== Predictions ====
Source	Ranking	As of
The Cook Political Report	Safe D	November 3, 2014
Rothenberg	Safe D	October 24, 2014
Sabato's Crystal Ball	Safe D	October 30, 2014
RCP	Safe D	November 2, 2014
Daily Kos Elections	Safe D	November 4, 2014

==== Results ====
New York's 20th congressional district, 2014
Party	Candidate	Votes	%
Democratic	Paul Tonko	103,437	50.7
Working Families	Paul Tonko	11,285	5.5
Independence	Paul Tonko	10,389	5.1
Total	Paul Tonko (incumbent)	125,111	61.3
Republican	James Fischer	61,820	30.2
Conservative	James Fischer	17,284	8.5
Total	James Fischer	79,104	38.7
Total votes		204,215	100.0
Democratic hold			

== District 21 ==
2014 New York's 21st congressional district election
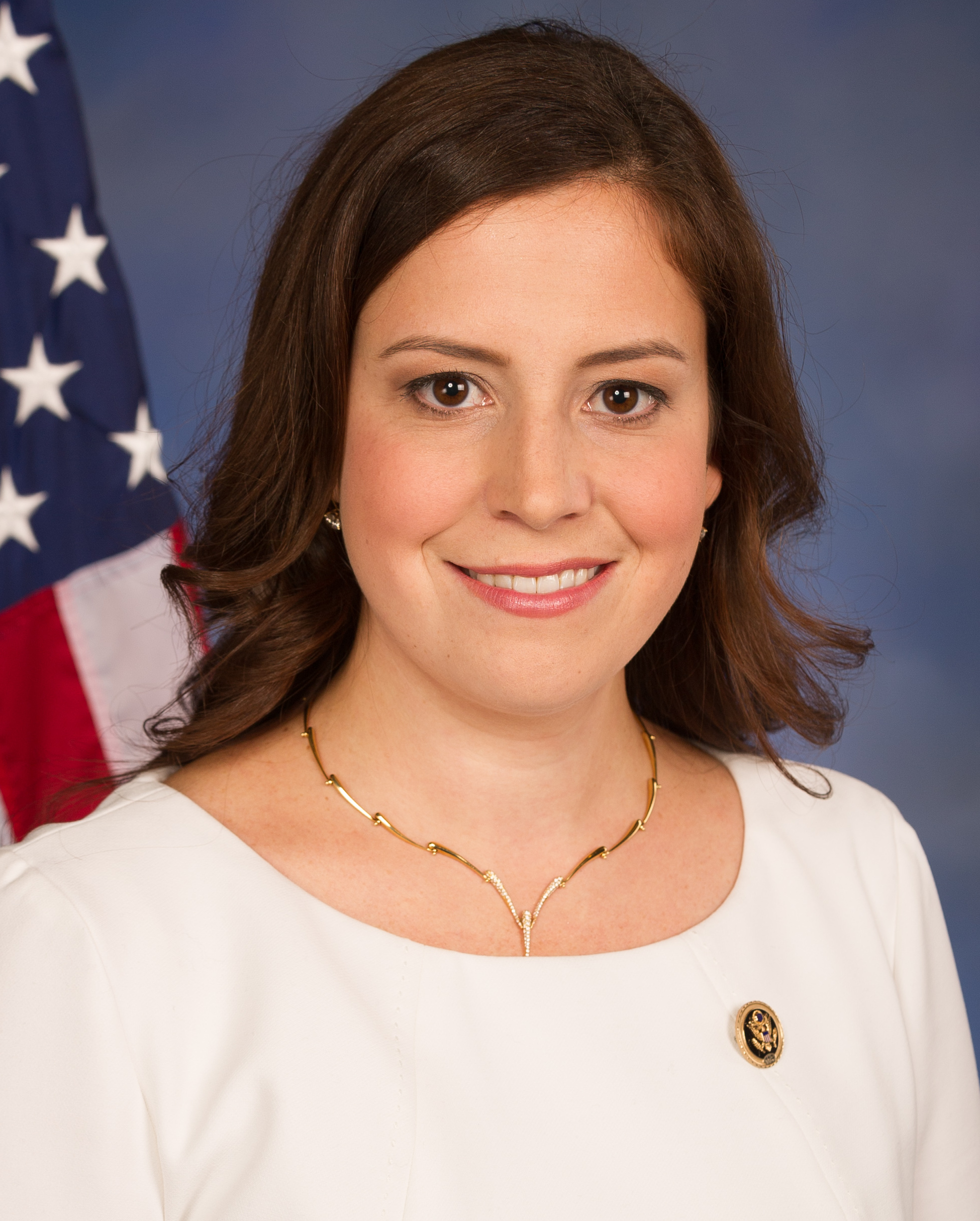

	Majority party	Minority party	Third party
Candidate	Elise Stefanik	Aaron Woolf	Matthew Funiciello
Party	Republican	Democratic	Green
Alliance	Conservative; Independence	Working Families
Popular vote	96,226	59,063	19,238
Percentage	55.1%	33.8%	11.0%
- County results Stefanik: 40–50% 50–60% 60–70% 70–80% Woolf: 40–50%
U.S. Representative before election
Bill Owens
Democratic
Elected U.S. Representative
Elise Stefanik
Republican

The 21st district, the state's largest and most rural, includes most of the North Country and borders Vermont to the east. Incumbent Democrat Bill Owens, who had represented the district since 2013, and previously represented the 23rd district from 2009 to 2013, announced he would not seek re-election on January 14, 2014. He had been re-elected in 2012 with 50.1% of the vote, and the district had an even PVI.

=== Democratic primary ===
For the Democrats, multiple mooted candidates declined to run. The Democratic county committee chairs in the district thus nominated Aaron Woolf, a relatively unknown grocery store owner and filmmaker with a home in Elizabethtown, as their nominee at a meeting on February 12, 2014. In response, Macomb town councilman Stephen Burke declared his candidacy, but he was removed from the ballot after he filed insufficient ballot petition signatures. Green candidate Donald Hassig was also removed for the same reason.

==== Candidates ====
===== Nominee =====
- Aaron Woolf, grocery store owner and filmmaker (designated party nominee)

===== Removed from ballot =====
- Stephen Burke, Macomb town councilman

===== Declined =====
- Darrel Aubertine, former state senator
- Bernie Bassett, Plattsburgh Town Supervisor
- Stuart Brody, former Essex County Democratic Chairman
- Jonathan Cardinal, director of economic development for Senator Kirsten Gillibrand
- Randy Douglas, chairman of the Essex County Board of Supervisors
- Lee Kindlon, attorney
- Scott Murphy, former U.S. Representative
- Bill Owens, incumbent U.S. Representative
- Addie Jenne Russell, state assembly member
- Dede Scozzafava, former state assembly member and Republican nominee for this seat in 2009
- John T. Sullivan, Jr., former Oswego Mayor

Woolf also received the Working Families nomination.

=== Republican primary ===
The county Republican committees endorsed Elise Stefanik, a former aide in the George W. Bush Administration, as their designated candidate in a meeting on February 7, 2014. Michael Ring, a broadcast engineer and political activist from Jefferson County, and Jamie Waller, a former Marine and political consultant, both initially entered the race but withdrew in March. Former 2012 nominee Matt Doheny entered the race. Actor John James, Warren County District Attorney Kate Hogan, State Senator Betty Little and 2009 and 2010 Conservative Party nominee Doug Hoffman did not run.

Joseph Gilbert, the former emergency services director for St. Lawrence County and a local Tea Party activist, withdrew from the Republican primary on April 11, 2014, due to personal and family problems. It was speculated that he might still run in the general election under the banner of the Constitution Party if he could resolve those problems by June, but this did not happen.

==== Candidates ====
===== Nominee =====
- Elise Stefanik, former George W. Bush administration aide (designated party nominee) (also received the Independence Party nomination)

===== Eliminated in primary =====
- Matt Doheny, investment fund manager, nominee for this seat in 2012 and nominee for New York's 23rd congressional district in 2010

===== Withdrawn =====
- Joe Gilbert, retired Army major and Tea Party activist
- Michael Ring, broadcast engineer and computer consultant
- Jamie Waller, former Marine and political consultant

===== Declined =====
- Doug Hoffman, Conservative Party nominee for New York's 23rd congressional district in 2009 and Republican candidate for the seat in 2010
- Kate Hogan, Warren County District Attorney
- John James, actor
- Betty Little, state senator
- Paul Maroun, mayor of Tupper Lake and Franklin County Legislator

==== Endorsements ====
Matt Doheny

U.S. Representatives

- Bill Paxon, former U.S. Representative and former Chairman of the National Republican Congressional Committee
Elise Stefanik

U.S. Representatives

- Paul Ryan, U.S. Representative (WI-01), Chairman of the House Committee on the Budget and nominee for Vice President of the United States in 2012

State officials

- Mitt Romney, former Governor of Massachusetts and nominee for President of the United States in 2012

State legislators

- Raymond Meier, former state senator
- Dan Stec, state assembly member

Individuals

- Doug Hoffman, businessman, Conservative Party nominee for New York's 23rd congressional district in 2009 and Republican candidate for the seat in 2010
- Freda Solomon, widow of former U.S. Representative Gerald Solomon
Joe Gilbert (withdrawn)

Individuals

- Susan D. Harris, columnist

==== Polling ====
Poll source	Date(s) administered	Sample size	Margin of error	Matt Doheny	Elise Stefanik	Undecided
Harper Polling	June 16–18, 2014	498	± 4.39%	37%	45%	18%
Public Opinion Strategies (R-Doheny)	January 20–21, 2014	283	± 5.83%	49%	13%	38%

==== Debate ====
2014 New York's 21st congressional district republican primary debate
No.	Date	Host	Moderator	Link	Republican	Republican
Key: P Participant A Absent N Not invited I Invited W Withdrawn						
Key: P Participant A Absent N Not invited I Invited W Withdrawn					Matt Doheny	Elise Stefanik
1	Jun. 13, 2014	WCFE-TV	Brian Ashley		P	P

==== Results ====
Republican primary results
Party	Candidate	Votes	%
Republican	Elise Stefanik	16,489	60.8
Republican	Matt Doheny	10,620	39.2
Total votes		27,109	100.0

Doheny and Stefanik also sought the Conservative and Independence Party nominations. Stefanik won the Conservative endorsement and Doheny won the Independence nomination, but after he lost the Republican primary, announced his support for Stefanik. He was eventually removed from the ballot and Stefanik took the Independence Party nomination.

=== Green primary ===
==== Candidates ====
===== Nominee =====
- Matt Funiciello, bakery owner and political activist

===== Removed from ballot =====
- Donald Hassig, environmental activist and nominee for the seat in 2012

=== General election ===
==== Endorsements ====
Aaron Woolf (D)

U.S. Representatives

- Bill Owens, U.S. representative from New York's 21st congressional district (2009–2015)
- Paul Tonko, U.S. representative from New York's 20th congressional district (2009–present)

Labor unions

- AFL-CIO
- International Brotherhood of Boilermakers
- National Association of Letter Carriers

Organizations

- Democratic Congressional Campaign Committee "Red to Blue" Program
- Sierra Club
Elise Stefanik (R)

U.S. Representatives

- Paul Ryan, U.S. Representative (WI-01), Chairman of the House Committee on the Budget and nominee for Vice President of the United States in 2012

State officials

- Mitt Romney, former governor of Massachusetts and nominee for President of the United States in 2012

State legislators

- Raymond Meier, former state senator
- Dan Stec, state assembly member

Organizations

- National Republican Congressional Committee "Young Guns" Program
- National Right to Life Committee

Individuals

- Matt Doheny, investment fund manager, nominee for this seat in 2012 and nominee for New York's 23rd congressional district in 2010
- Doug Hoffman, businessman, Conservative Party nominee for New York's 23rd congressional district in 2009 and Republican candidate for the seat in 2010
- Freda Solomon, widow of former U.S. Representative Gerald Solomon
Matt Funiciello (G)

Individuals

- Ralph Nader, attorney and four time presidential candidate

==== Debates ====
2014 New York's 21st congressional district debates
No.	Date	Host	Moderator	Link	Democratic	Republican	Green
Key: P Participant A Absent N Not invited I Invited W Withdrawn							
Key: P Participant A Absent N Not invited I Invited W Withdrawn					Aaron Woolf	Elise Stefanik	Matt Funiciello
1	Oct. 8, 2014	Time Warner Cable	Liz Benjamin		P	P	P
2	Oct. 22, 2014	North Country Public Radio; WCFE-TV; WWNY-TV	Brian Ashley		P	P	P

==== Polling ====
Poll source	Date(s) administered	Sample size	Margin of error	Aaron Woolf (D)	Elise Stefanik (R)	Matt Funiciello (G)	Matt Doheny (I)	Undecided
Harper Polling	October 27–28, 2014	560	± 4.1%	33%	47%	14%	—	6%
Siena College	October 20–22, 2014	674	± 3.8%	32%	50%	11%	—	8%
New York Times/CBS News Battleground Tracker	October 16–23, 2014	327	± 8.0%	40%	45%	1%	—	14%
Harper Polling	September 25–29, 2014	674	± 3.8%	37%	45%	8%	—	10%
Siena College	September 4, 7–9, 2014	591	± 4.0%	33%	46%	10%	1%	12%

Hypothetical polling

Poll source	Date(s) administered	Sample size	Margin of error	Aaron Woolf (D)	Matt Doheny (R)	Matt Funiciello (G)	Undecided
Public Opinion Strategies^	May 19–20, 2014	400	± 4.9%	21%	43%	5%	31%

- ^ Internal poll for the Matt Doheny campaign

==== Predictions ====
Source	Ranking	As of
The Cook Political Report	Likely R (flip)	November 3, 2014
Rothenberg	Safe R (flip)	October 24, 2014
Sabato's Crystal Ball	Likely R (flip)	October 30, 2014
RCP	Likely R (flip)	November 2, 2014
Daily Kos Elections	Likely R (flip)	November 4, 2014

==== Results ====
New York's 21st congressional district, 2014
Party	Candidate	Votes	%
Republican	Elise M. Stefanik	79,615	45.6
Conservative	Elise M. Stefanik	12,207	7.0
Independence	Elise M. Stefanik	4,404	2.5
Total	Elise Stefanik	96,226	55.1
Democratic	Aaron G. Woolf	53,140	30.5
Working Families	Aaron G. Woolf	5,923	3.4
Total	Aaron G. Woolf	59,063	33.9
Green	Matthew J. Funiciello	19,238	11.0
Total votes		174,668	100.0
Republican gain from Democratic			

== District 22 ==
2014 New York's 22nd congressional district election
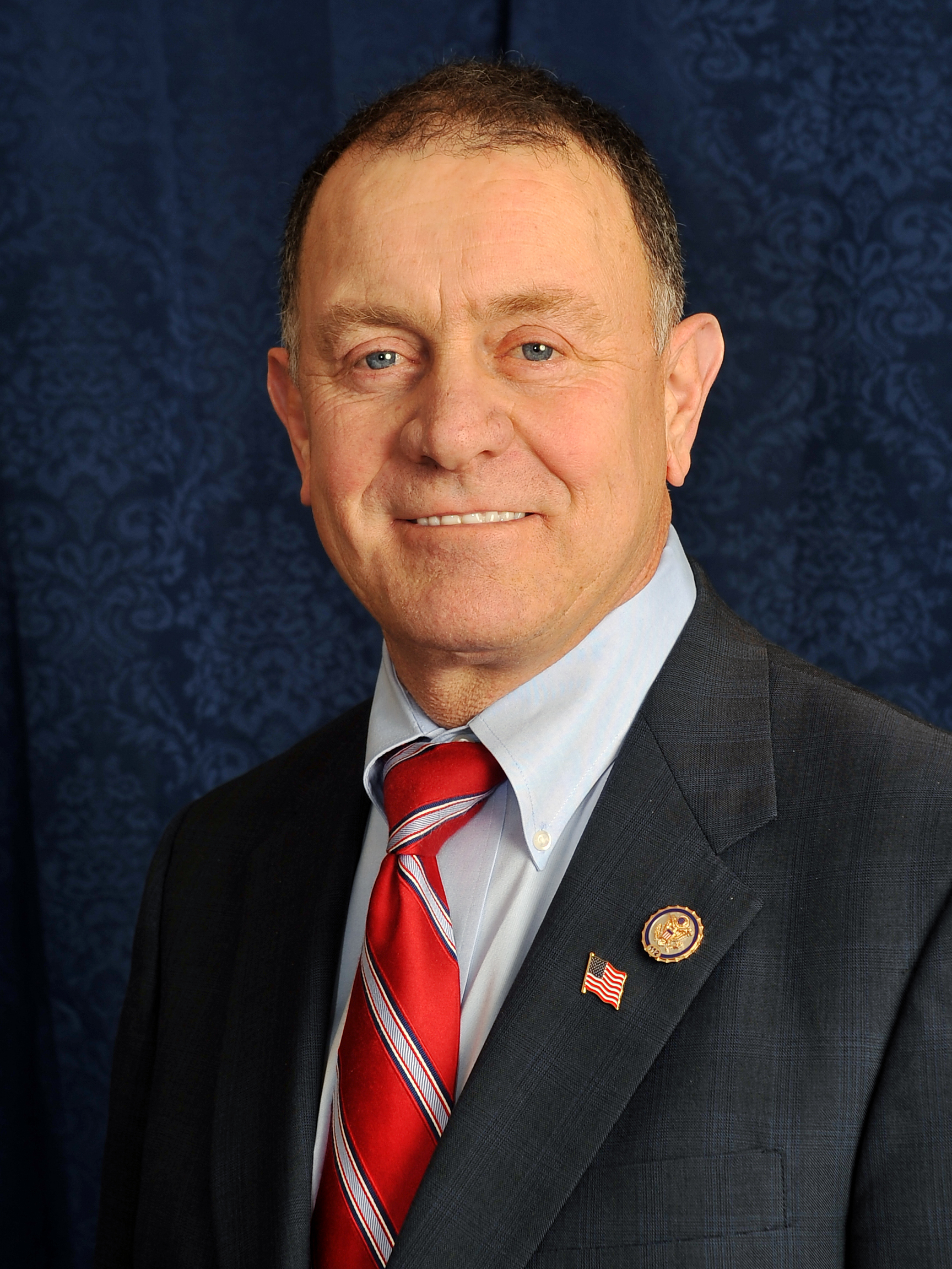
	Majority party
Candidate	Richard Hanna
Party	Republican
Alliance	Independence
Popular vote	129,851
Percentage	100.0%
- County results Hanna: 60–70% 70–80% 80–90%
U.S. Representative before election
Richard Hanna
Republican
Elected U.S. Representative
Richard Hanna
Republican

The 22nd district is located in Central New York and includes all of Chenango, Cortland, Madison and Oneida counties, and parts of Broome, Herkimer, Oswego and Tioga counties. Incumbent Republican Richard L. Hanna, who had represented the district since 2013, and previously represented the 24th district from 2011 to 2013, ran for re-election. He was re-elected in 2012 with 61% of the vote, and the district had a PVI of R+3.

=== Republican primary ===
==== Candidates ====
===== Nominee =====
- Richard Hanna, incumbent U.S. Representative

===== Eliminated in primary =====
- Claudia Tenney, state assembly member

===== Disqualified =====
- Michael Kicinski, electronics engineer, Tea Party activist and candidate for this seat in 2012

===== Withdrawn =====
- Michael Vasquez, founder and president of MV Consulting, Inc.

==== Campaign ====
The campaign between Hanna and Tenney turned increasingly negative, with both candidates concerned less about their opponent's political positions and more about each other's personal histories. Hanna also refused to debate Tenney.

==== Results ====
Republican primary results
Party	Candidate	Votes	%
Republican	Richard L. Hanna (incumbent)	16,119	53.5
Republican	Claudia Tenney	14,000	46.5
Total votes		30,119	100.0

Hanna also received the Conservative and Independence Party nominations.

=== Democratic primary ===
No Democrats filed to run.

=== General election ===
==== Endorsements ====
Richard Hanna (R)

Labor unions

- National Association of Letter Carriers

Organizations

- National Rifle Association - Political Victory Fund

==== Polling ====
Hypothetical polling

Poll source	Date(s) administered	Sample size	Margin of error	Richard Hanna (R)	Generic Democrat	Undecided
Public Policy Polling	October 3–4, 2013	880	± ?	40%	48%	13%

==== Predictions ====
Source	Ranking	As of
The Cook Political Report	Safe R	November 3, 2014
Rothenberg	Safe R	October 24, 2014
Sabato's Crystal Ball	Safe R	October 30, 2014
RCP	Safe R	November 2, 2014
Daily Kos Elections	Safe R	November 4, 2014

==== Results ====
New York's 22nd congressional district, 2014
Party	Candidate	Votes	%
Republican	Richard L. Hanna	113,574	87.5
Independence	Richard L. Hanna	16,277	12.5
Total	Richard L. Hanna (incumbent)	129,851	100.0
Total votes		129,851	100.0
Republican hold			

== District 23 ==
2014 New York's 23rd congressional district election
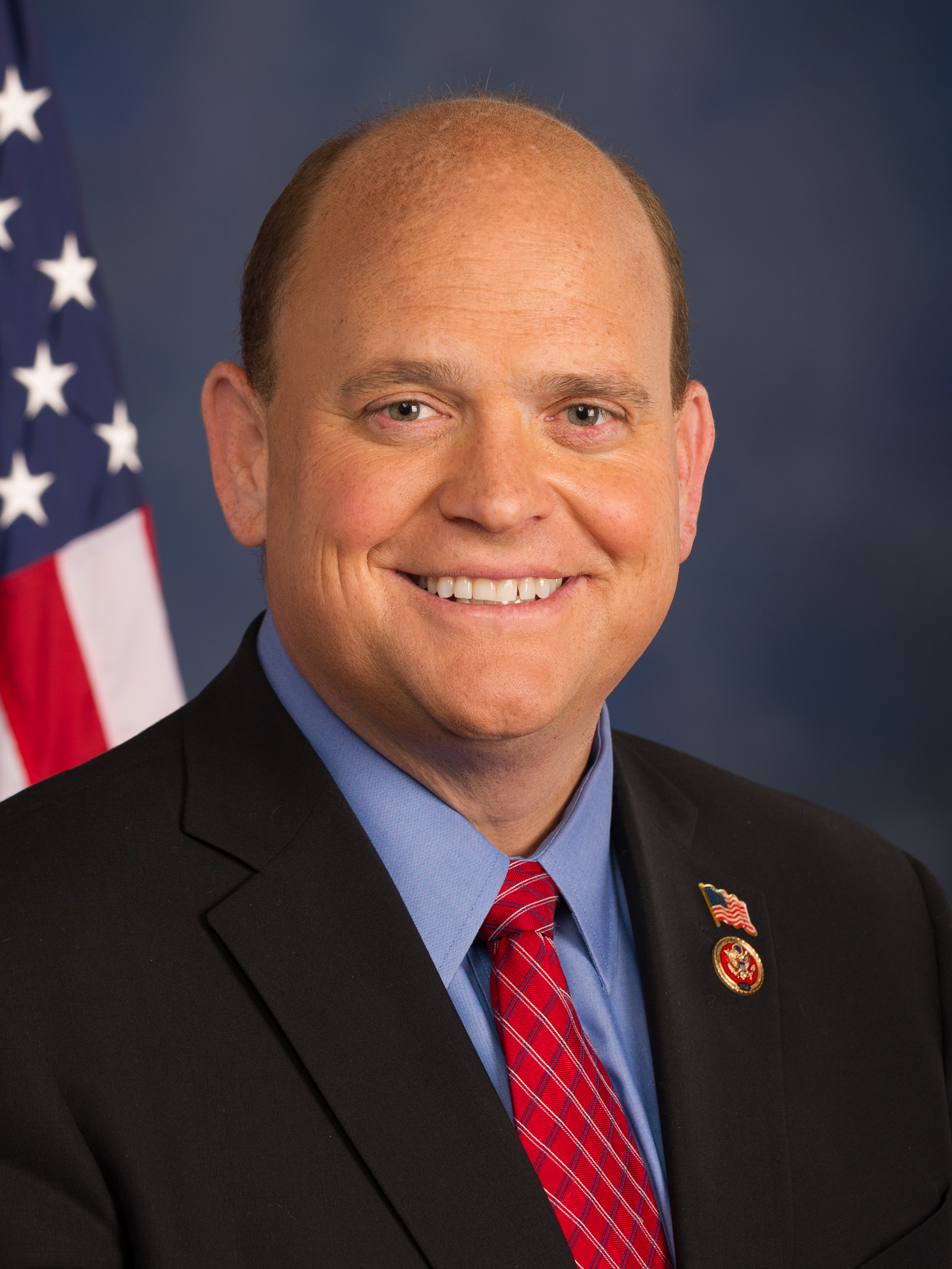

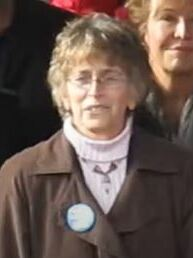
	Majority party	Minority party
Candidate	Tom Reed	Martha Robertson
Party	Republican	Democratic
Alliance	Conservative; Independence	Working Families
Popular vote	113,130	70,242
Percentage	61.7%	38.3%
- County results Reed: 50–60% 60–70% 70–80% Robertson: 60–70%
U.S. Representative before election
Tom Reed
Republican
Elected U.S. Representative
Tom Reed
Republican

The 23rd district includes all of Allegany, Cattaraugus, Chautauqua, Chemung, Schuyler, Seneca, Steuben, Tompkins and Yates counties, along with parts of Ontario and Tioga counties. Incumbent Republican Tom Reed, who had represented the district since 2013, and previously represented the 29th district from 2009 to 2013, ran for re-election. He was re-elected in 2012 with 52% of the vote, and the district had a PVI of R+3.

=== Republican primary ===
==== Candidates ====
===== Nominee =====
- Tom Reed, incumbent U.S. Representative

Reed also received the Conservative and Independence Party nominations.

=== Democratic primary ===
==== Candidates ====
===== Nominee =====
- Martha Robertson, chair of the Tompkins County legislature

===== Declined =====
- Nate Shinagawa, Tompkins County legislator and nominee for this seat in 2012

Robertson also received the Working Families nomination.

=== General election ===
==== Endorsements ====
Tom Reed (R)

Organizations

- National Republican Congressional Committee "Patriot" Program
- National Rifle Association - Political Victory Fund
- National Right to Life Committee
- No Labels
- United States Chamber of Commerce
Martha Robertson (D)

Labor unions

- AFL-CIO
- International Brotherhood of Boilermakers
- National Association of Letter Carriers

Organizations

- Democratic Congressional Campaign Committee "Red to Blue" Program
- EMILY's List
- J Street
- Sierra Club

==== Debates ====
- Complete video of debate, October 23, 2014

==== Polling ====
Poll source	Date(s) administered	Sample size	Margin of error	Tom Reed (R)	Martha Robertson (D)	Undecided
New York Times/CBS News Battleground Tracker	October 16–23, 2014	369	± 8.0%	49%	39%	12%

Hypothetical polling

Poll source	Date(s) administered	Sample size	Margin of error	Tom Reed (R)	Generic Democrat	Undecided
Public Policy Polling	October 3–4, 2013	908	± ?	42%	48%	10%

==== Predictions ====
Source	Ranking	As of
The Cook Political Report	Safe R	November 3, 2014
Rothenberg	Safe R	October 24, 2014
Sabato's Crystal Ball	Likely R	October 30, 2014
RCP	Likely R	November 2, 2014
Daily Kos Elections	Likely R	November 4, 2014

==== Results ====
New York's 23rd congressional district, 2014
Party	Candidate	Votes	%
Republican	Thomas W. Reed, II	94,375	51.5
Conservative	Thomas W. Reed, II	13,917	7.6
Independence	Thomas W. Reed, II	4,838	2.6
Total	Tom Reed (incumbent)	113,130	61.7
Democratic	Martha Robertson	60,233	32.8
Working Families	Martha Robertson	10,009	5.5
Total	Martha Robertson	70,242	38.3
Total votes		183,372	100.0
Republican hold			

== District 24 ==
2014 New York's 24th congressional district election
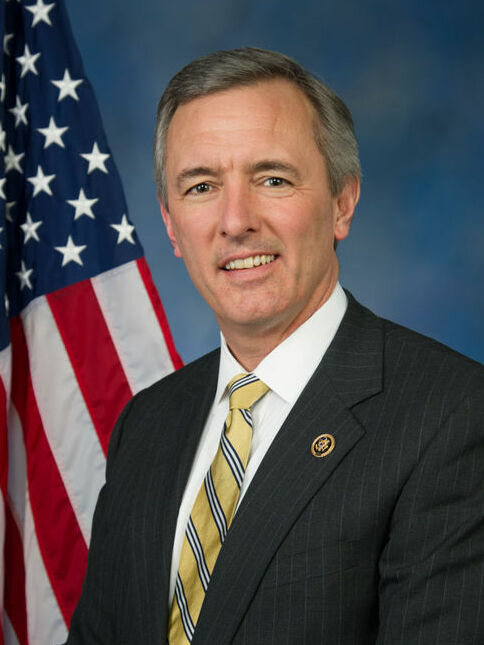

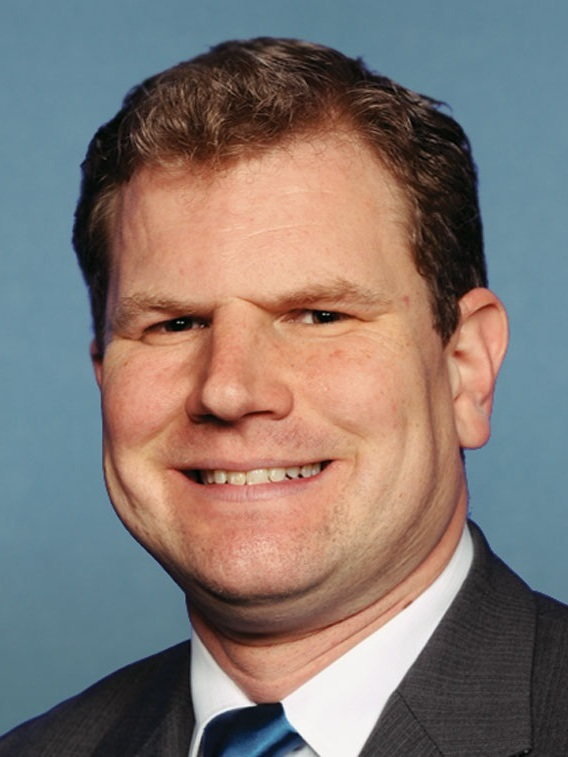
	Majority party	Minority party
Candidate	John Katko	Dan Maffei
Party	Republican	Democratic
Alliance	Conservative; Reform; Independence	Working Families
Popular vote	118,474	80,304
Percentage	59.6%	40.4%
- County results Kakto: 50–60% 60–70%
U.S. Representative before election
Dan Maffei
Democratic
Elected U.S. Representative
John Katko
Republican

The 24th district includes all of Cayuga, Onondaga and Wayne counties, and the western part of Oswego County. Incumbent Democrat Dan Maffei, who had represented the district since 2013, and previously represented the 25th district from 2009 to 2011, ran for re-election. He was re-elected in 2012 with 49% of the vote, defeating Republican incumbent Ann Marie Buerkle, who had beaten Maffei in 2010. The district had a PVI of D+5.

=== Democratic primary ===
==== Candidates ====
===== Nominee =====
- Dan Maffei, incumbent U.S. Representative

Maffei also received the Working Families nomination.

=== Republican primary ===
Buerkle initially considered challenging Maffei again in 2014, but declined to run in September 2013. Instead, the Republicans endorsed U.S. Attorney John Katko.

==== Candidates ====
===== Nominee =====
- John Katko, former Assistant United States Attorney in the Department of Justice

===== Declined =====
- Ann Marie Buerkle, former U.S. Representative
- Janet Burman, economist
- Rick Guy, lawyer
- Ian Hunter, businessman
- John Lemondes, retired Army Lieutenant Colonel
- Jason Lesch, accountant
- Jane Rossi, businesswoman
- Randy Wolken, president of the Manufacturers Association of Central New York

Katko also had the Conservative and Independence nominations.

=== General election ===
==== Endorsements ====
Dan Maffei (D)

Labor unions

- AFL-CIO
- International Brotherhood of Boilermakers
- National Association of Letter Carriers

Organizations

- Democratic Congressional Campaign Committee "Frontline" Program
- Everytown for Gun Safety
- J Street
- No Labels
- Sierra Club
John Katko (R)

Organizations

- National Republican Congressional Committee "Young Guns" Program
- National Rifle Association - Political Victory Fund

==== Debate ====
2014 New York's 24th congressional district debate
No.	Date	Host	Moderator	Link	Democratic	Republican
Key: P Participant A Absent N Not invited I Invited W Withdrawn						
Key: P Participant A Absent N Not invited I Invited W Withdrawn					Dan Maffei	John Katko
1	Oct. 27, 2014	Time Warner Cable News	Liz Benjamin; Bill Carey; Seth Voorhees		P	P

==== Polling ====
Poll source	Date(s) administered	Sample size	Margin of error	Dan Maffei (D)	John Katko (R)	Undecided
Siena College	October 22–24, 2014	704	± 3.7%	42%	52%	6%
Global Strategy Group (D-Maffei)	October 20–22, 2014	400	± 4.9%	45%	40%	15%
New York Times/CBS News Battleground Tracker	October 16–23, 2014	447	± 7.0%	48%	41%	11%
Public Opinion Strategies (R-Katko)	September 22–23, 2014	400	± 4.9%	46%	43%	11%
Siena College	September 17–18, 2014	598	± 4%	50%	42%	8%
Public Opinion Strategies (R-Katko)	July 27–29, 2014	400	± 4.9%	45%	40%	15%

==== Predictions ====
Source	Ranking	As of
The Cook Political Report	Tossup	November 3, 2014
Rothenberg	Tilt D	October 24, 2014
Sabato's Crystal Ball	Lean D	October 30, 2014
RCP	Tossup	November 2, 2014
Daily Kos Elections	Tossup	November 4, 2014

==== Results ====
New York's 24th congressional district, 2014
Party	Candidate	Votes	%
Republican	John M. Katko	93,881	47.2
Conservative	John M. Katko	17,768	9.0
Independence	John M. Katko	6,825	3.4
Total	John Katko	118,474	59.6
Democratic	Daniel Maffei	72,631	36.5
Working Families	Daniel Maffei	7,673	3.9
Total	Dan Maffei (incumbent)	80,304	40.4
Total votes		198,778	100.0
Republican gain from Democratic			

== District 25 ==
2014 New York's 25th congressional district election
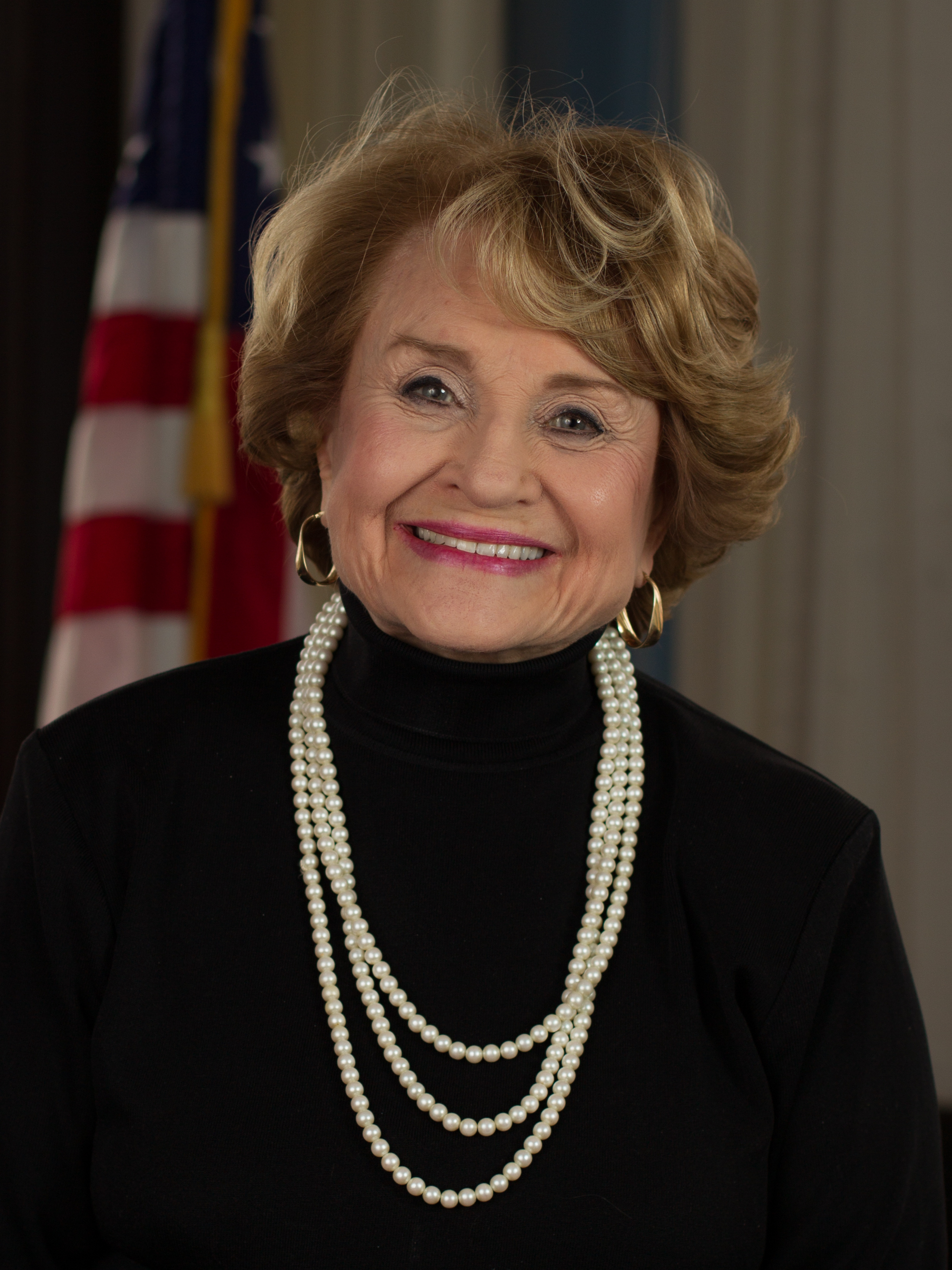

	Majority party	Minority party
Candidate	Louise Slaughter	Mark Assini
Party	Democratic	Republican
Alliance	Working Families	Conservative
Popular vote	96,803	95,932
Percentage	50.2%	49.8%
- County results Slaughter: 40–50%
U.S. Representative before election
Louise Slaughter
Democratic
Elected U.S. Representative
Louise Slaughter
Democratic

The 25th district located entirely within Monroe County, centered on the city of Rochester. Incumbent Democrat Louise Slaughter, who had represented the district since 2013, and previously represented the 28th district from 1993 to 2013 and the 30th district from 1987 to 1993, ran for re-election. She was re-elected in 2012 with 57% of the vote, and the district had a PVI of D+7.

=== Democratic primary ===
Due to Slaughter's age and recent health problems, there was speculation that she might retire, with Rochester Mayor Lovely A. Warren considered likely to run for the Democrats. On January 15, 2014, Slaughter confirmed that she was running again.

==== Candidates ====
===== Nominee =====
- Louise Slaughter, incumbent U.S. Representative

===== Declined =====
- Lovely Warren, Mayor of Rochester

She also received the Working Families nomination.

=== Republican primary ===
==== Candidates ====
===== Nominee =====
- Mark Assini, Town Supervisor of Gates and the Conservative nominee for the seat in 2004

He also received the Conservative Party nomination.

=== General election ===
Independent Tim Dean was also running, but was not on the ballot.

==== Endorsements ====
Louise Slaughter (D)

Labor unions

- AFL-CIO
- International Brotherhood of Boilermakers
- National Association of Letter Carriers

Organizations

- Sierra Club

==== Predictions ====
Source	Ranking	As of
The Cook Political Report	Safe D	November 3, 2014
Rothenberg	Safe D	October 24, 2014
Sabato's Crystal Ball	Safe D	October 30, 2014
RCP	Safe D	November 2, 2014
Daily Kos Elections	Safe D	November 4, 2014

==== Results ====
Despite it being considered a non-competitive race, Slaughter was re-elected by only 869 votes.

New York's 25th congressional district, 2014
Party	Candidate	Votes	%
Democratic	Louise Slaughter	87,264	45.3
Working Families	Louise Slaughter	9,539	4.9
Total	Louise Slaughter (incumbent)	96,803	50.2
Republican	Mark Assini	75,990	39.4
Conservative	Mark Assini	19,942	10.4
Total	Mark Assini	95,932	49.8
Total votes		192,735	100.0
Democratic hold			

== District 26 ==
2014 New York's 26th congressional district election
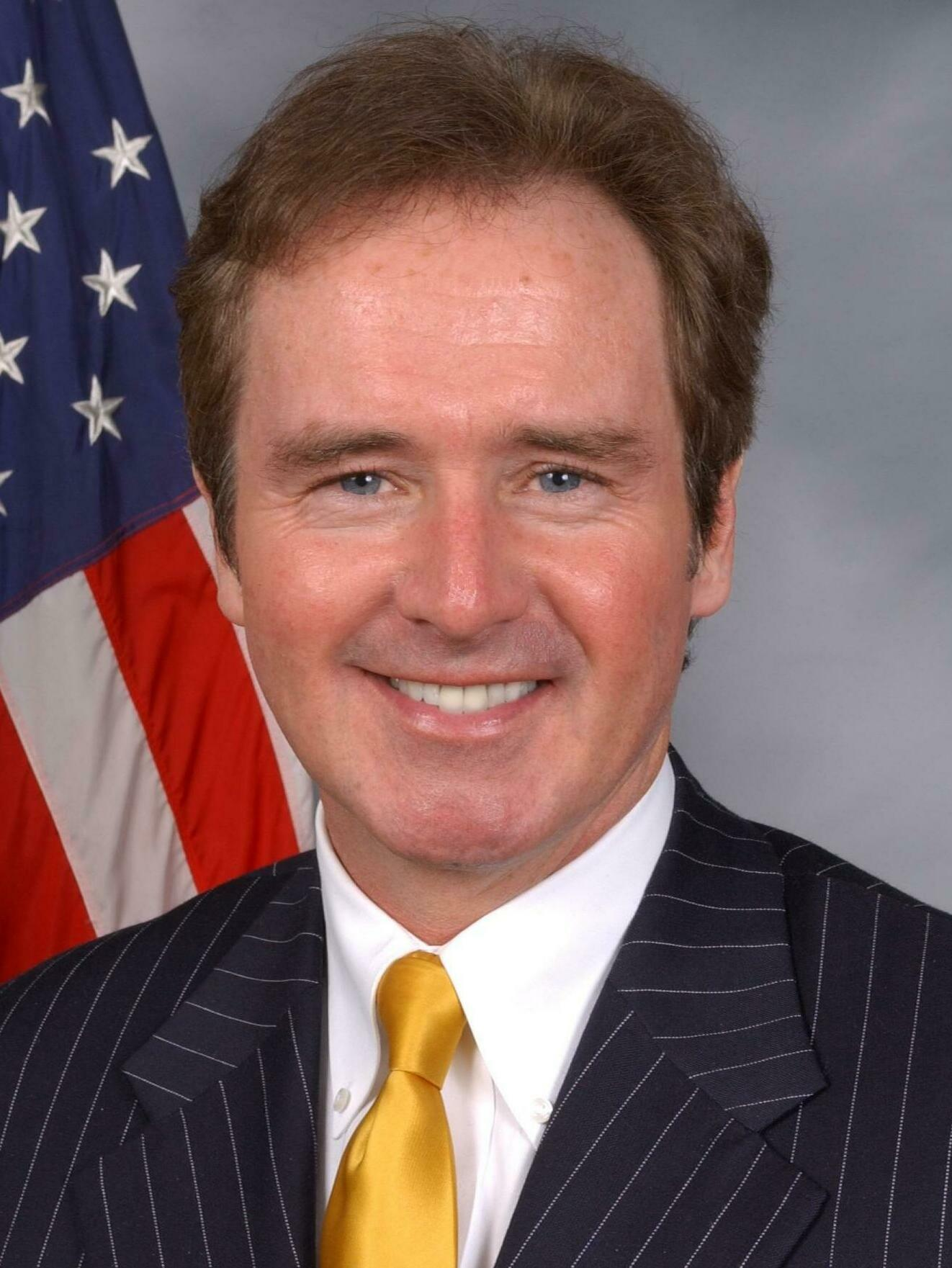

	Majority party	Minority party
Candidate	Brian Higgins	Kathleen A. Weppner
Party	Democratic	Republican
Alliance	Working Families	Conservative
Popular vote	113,210	52,909
Percentage	68.1%	31.9%
- County results Higgins: 50–60% 60–70%
U.S. Representative before election
Brian Higgins
Democratic
Elected U.S. Representative
Brian Higgins
Democratic

The 25th district located in Erie and Niagara counties and includes the cities of Buffalo and Niagara Falls. Incumbent Democrat Brian Higgins, who had represented the district since 2013, and previously represented the 27th district from 2005 to 2013, ran for re-election. He was re-elected in 2012 with 75% of the vote, and the district had a PVI of D+12.

=== Democratic primary ===
==== Candidates ====
===== Nominee =====
- Brian Higgins, incumbent U.S. Representative

===== Disqualified =====
- Emin Egriu

He also received the Working Families nomination.

=== Republican primary ===
==== Candidates ====
===== Nominee =====
- Kathy Weppner, former talk radio host

He also received the Conservative nomination.

=== General election ===
==== Endorsements ====
Brian Higgins (D)

Labor unions

- AFL-CIO
- International Brotherhood of Boilermakers
- National Association of Letter Carriers

Organizations

- Sierra Club

==== Predictions ====
Source	Ranking	As of
The Cook Political Report	Safe D	November 3, 2014
Rothenberg	Safe D	October 24, 2014
Sabato's Crystal Ball	Safe D	October 30, 2014
RCP	Safe D	November 2, 2014
Daily Kos Elections	Safe D	November 4, 2014

==== Results ====
New York's 26th congressional district, 2014
Party	Candidate	Votes	%
Democratic	Brian Higgins	100,648	60.6
Working Families	Brian Higgins	12,562	7.5
Total	Brian Higgins (incumbent)	113,210	68.1
Republican	Kathleen A. Weppner	38,477	23.2
Conservative	Kathleen A. Weppner	14,432	8.7
Total	Kathleen A. Weppner	52,909	31.9
Total votes		166,119	100.0
Democratic hold			

== District 27 ==
2014 New York's 27th congressional district election
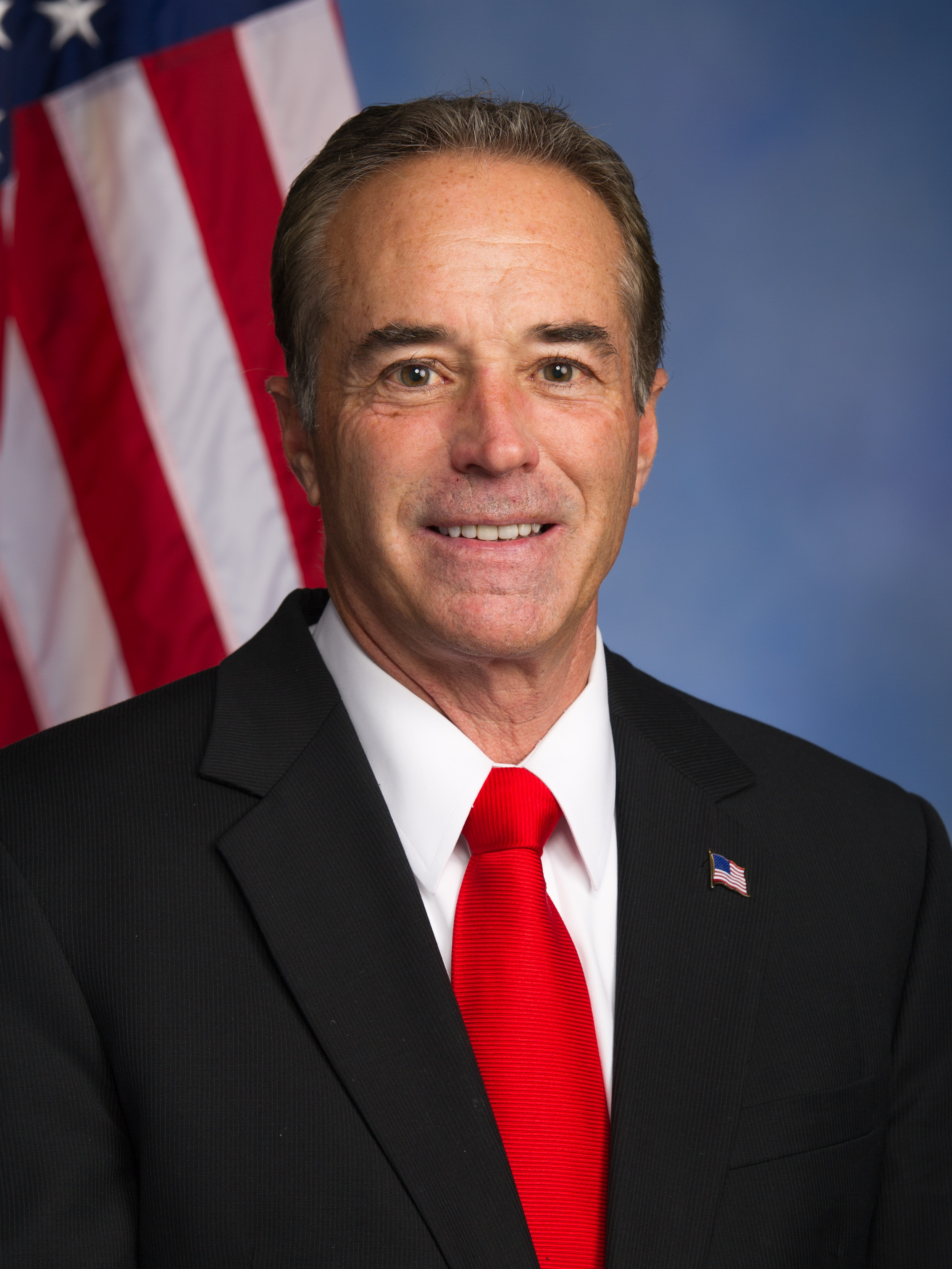

	Majority party	Minority party
Candidate	Chris Collins	James D. O'Donnell
Party	Republican	Democratic
Alliance	Conservative; Independence	Working Families
Popular vote	144,675	58,911
Percentage	71.1%	28.9%
- County results Collins: 60–70% 70–80%
U.S. Representative before election
Chris Collins
Republican
Elected U.S. Representative
Chris Collins
Republican

The 27th district is located in Western New York and includes all of Orleans, Genesee, Wyoming and Livingston counties, and parts of Erie, Monroe, Niagara and Ontario counties. Incumbent Republican Chris Collins, who had represented the district since 2013, ran for re-election. He was elected in 2012, defeating Democratic incumbent Kathy Hochul with 51% of the vote. The district had a PVI of R+8.

=== Republican primary ===
==== Candidates ====
===== Nominee =====
- Chris Collins, incumbent U.S. Representative

Collins also received the Conservative and Independence nominations.

=== Democratic primary ===
==== Candidates ====
===== Nominee =====
- Jim O'Donnell, police officer

===== Declined =====
- Kathy Hochul, former U.S. Representative (running for Lieutenant Governor)

O'Donnell also received the Working Families nomination.

=== General election ===
==== Endorsements ====
Chris Collins (R)

Organizations

- National Rifle Association - Political Victory Fund
- National Right to Life Committee

==== Predictions ====
Source	Ranking	As of
The Cook Political Report	Safe R	November 3, 2014
Rothenberg	Safe R	October 24, 2014
Sabato's Crystal Ball	Safe R	October 30, 2014
RCP	Safe R	November 2, 2014
Daily Kos Elections	Safe R	November 4, 2014

==== Results ====
New York's 27th congressional district, 2014
Party	Candidate	Votes	%
Republican	Chris Collins	109,171	53.6
Conservative	Chris Collins	27,605	13.6
Independence	Chris Collins	7,899	3.9
Total	Chris Collins (incumbent)	144,675	71.1
Democratic	James D. O'Donnell	50,939	25.0
Working Families	James D. O'Donnell	7,972	3.9
Total	James D. O'Donnell	58,911	28.9
Total votes		203,586	100.0
Republican hold			

== See also ==
- 2014 United States House of Representatives elections
- 2014 United States elections
