= 2010 United States House of Representatives elections in New York =

- November 2, 2010

All 29 New York seats to the United States House of Representatives elections
	Majority party	Minority party
Party	Democratic	Republican
Last election	26	3
Seats before	27	2
Seats won	21	8
Seat change	▼6	▲6
Popular vote	2,600,900	1,854,302
Percentage	57.85%	41.25%
Swing	9.22% ▼	9.28% ▲
- Results: Democratic hold Republican hold Republican gain

The 2010 congressional elections in New York were held on November 2, 2010 to determine representation from the state of New York in the United States House of Representatives. New York had 29 seats in the House. Representatives are elected to two-year terms.

The election marked the first time that New York used electronic voting, as the state was the last to implement the process under the Help America Vote Act. Democrats had gained an additional seat in a 2009 special election in the 23rd district, bringing Republicans to an all-time low of two seats in the New York delegation leading into the election.

Republican candidates prevailed in a total of eight congressional races in New York, while Democratic candidates prevailed in the other 21; thus, the GOP gained a total of six House seats in New York. The closest race occurred in New York's 1st congressional district, where Republican candidate Randy Altschuler did not concede to Democratic incumbent Congressman Tim Bishop until December 8.

== Overview ==
Results of the 2010 United States House of Representatives elections in New York by district:

District	Democratic		Republican		Others		Total	Result
District	Votes	%	Votes	%	Votes	%	Votes	Result
District 1	98,316	50.15%	97,723	49.85%	0	0.00%	196,039	Democratic hold
District 2	94,594	56.35%	72,029	42.91%	1,256	0.75%	167,879	Democratic hold
District 3	51,346	28.05%	131,674	71.95%	0	0.00%	183,020	Republican hold
District 4	94,483	53.62%	81,718	46.38%	0	0.00%	176,201	Democratic hold
District 5	72,239	63.07%	41,493	36.23%	798	0.70%	114,530	Democratic hold
District 6	85,096	87.80%	11,826	12.20%	0	0.00%	96,922	Democratic hold
District 7	71,247	80.57%	16,145	18.26%	1,038	1.17%	88,430	Democratic hold
District 8	98,839	75.54%	31,996	24.46%	0	0.00%	130,835	Democratic hold
District 9	67,011	60.84%	43,129	39.16%	0	0.00%	110,140	Democratic hold
District 10	95,485	91.15%	7,419	7.08%	1,853	1.77%	104,757	Democratic hold
District 11	104,297	90.57%	10,858	9.43%	0	0.00%	115,155	Democratic hold
District 12	68,624	93.87%	0	0.00%	4,482	6.13%	73,106	Democratic hold
District 13	60,773	47.96%	65,024	51.31%	929	0.73%	126,726	Republican gain
District 14	107,327	75.11%	32,065	22.44%	3,508	2.45%	142,900	Democratic hold
District 15	91,225	80.42%	11,754	10.36%	10,450	9.21%	113,429	Democratic hold
District 16	61,642	95.72%	2,758	4.28%	0	0.00%	64,400	Democratic hold
District 17	95,346	72.90%	29,792	22.78%	5,661	4.33%	130,799	Democratic hold
District 18	115,619	62.15%	70,413	37.85%	0	0.00%	186,032	Democratic hold
District 19	98,766	47.32%	109,956	52.68%	0	0.00%	208,722	Republican gain
District 20	107,075	45.13%	130,178	54.87%	0	0.00%	237,253	Republican gain
District 21	124,889	59.29%	85,752	40.71%	0	0.00%	210,641	Democratic hold
District 22	98,661	52.66%	88,687	47.34%	0	0.00%	187,348	Democratic hold
District 23	82,232	47.54%	80,237	46.39%	10,507	6.07%	172,976	Democratic gain
District 24	89,809	46.92%	101,599	53.08%	0	0.00%	191,408	Republican gain
District 25	103,954	49.84%	104,602	50.16%	0	0.00%	208,556	Republican gain
District 26	54,307	26.39%	151,449	73.61%	0	0.00%	205,756	Republican hold
District 27	119,085	60.94%	76,320	39.06%	0	0.00%	195,405	Democratic hold
District 28	102,514	64.92%	55,392	35.08%	0	0.00%	157,906	Democratic hold
District 29	86,099	43.39%	112,314	56.61%	0	0.00%	198,413	Republican gain
Total	2,600,900	57.85%	1,854,302	41.25%	40,482	0.90%	4,495,684	

== District 1 ==
2010 New York's 1st congressional district election
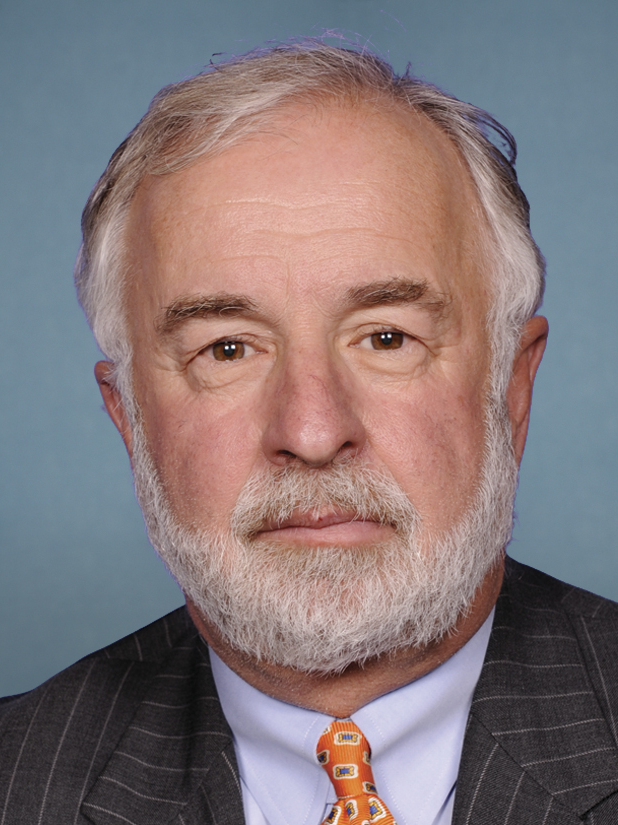

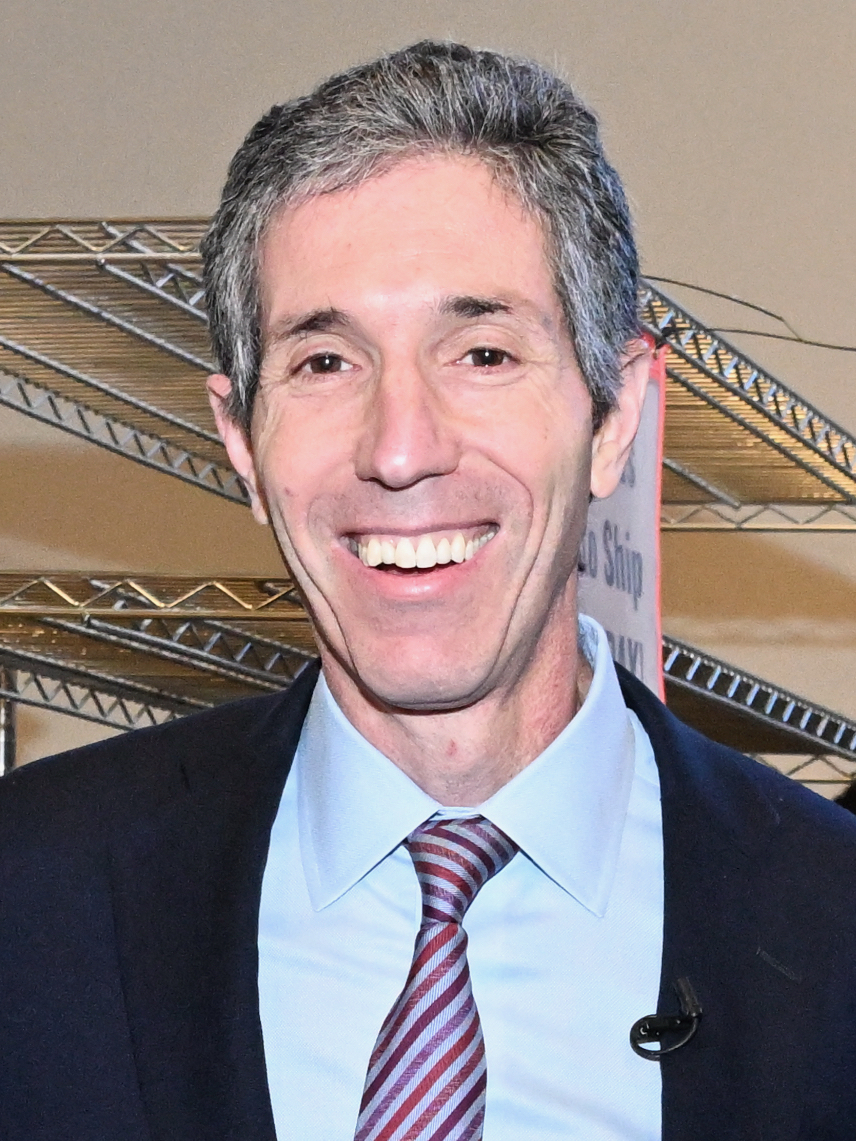
Nominee	Tim Bishop	Randy Altschuler
Party	Democratic	Republican
Popular vote	98,316	97,723
Percentage	48.7%	48.4%
- County results Bishop: 50–60%
U.S. Representative before election
Tim Bishop
Democratic
Elected U.S. Representative
Tim Bishop
Democratic

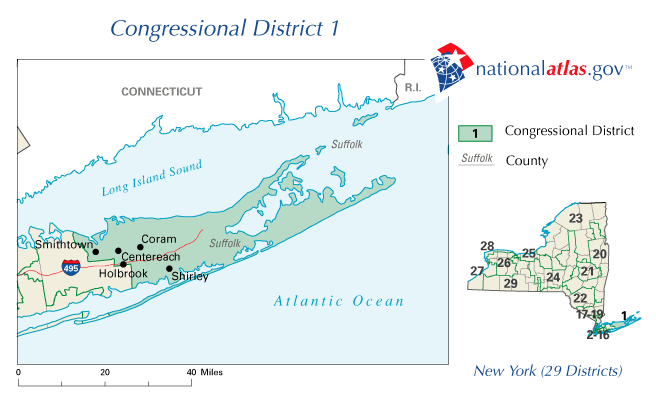

Democratic, Working Families and Independence incumbent Tim Bishop was challenged by Republican and Conservative Party nominee Randy Altschuler, a local businessman. It was the last undecided congressional election in the country when Altschuler conceded on December 8, 2010.

In the Republican primary, Altschuler won against George Demos, an attorney and prosecutor who worked on Bernard Madoff's case. State Republican Party chairman Edward F. Cox was allegedly trying to dissuade primary challengers to his son Christopher Nixon Cox, grandson of former President Richard Nixon. Bishop had roughly $1 million cash on hand, while Altschuler had raised $800,000. A February 2010 SurveyUSA poll showed Bishop with a slight 47% to 45% lead over Altschuler.

On election night, Bishop had a 3,500 vote lead. However, after voting machines were rechecked, Altschuler had a 400-vote lead. Following a partial recount of absentee ballots, Bishop reportedly held a 15-vote lead on November 19. Altschuler conceded the election on December 8, 2010; Bishop led by a 263-vote margin.

- NY - District 1 at OurCampaigns.com
- Race ranking and details from CQ Politics
- Campaign contributions from OpenSecrets
- Race profile at The New York Times

=== Polling ===
Poll source	Dates administered	Tim Bishop (D)	Randy Altschuler (R)	Undecided
Siena	October 6–11, 2010	51%	39%	—
Survey USA	January 16–18, 2010	47%	45%	8%
McLaughlin & Associates	November 18–19, 2009	46%	26%	—

==== Predictions ====
Source	Ranking	As of
The Cook Political Report	Tossup	November 1, 2010
Rothenberg	Tilt D	November 1, 2010
Sabato's Crystal Ball	Likely D	November 1, 2010
RCP	Tossup	November 1, 2010
CQ Politics	Tossup	October 28, 2010
The New York Times	Lean D	November 1, 2010
FiveThirtyEight	Lean D	November 1, 2010

=== Results ===
New York's 1st congressional district election, 2010
Party	Candidate	Votes	%
Democratic	Tim Bishop	85,051	42.10
Working Families	Tim Bishop	5,895	2.92
Independence	Tim Bishop	7,370	3.65
Total	Tim Bishop (incumbent)	98,316	48.67
Republican	Randy Altschuler	78,300	43.97
Conservative	Randy Altschuler	19,423	9.66
Total	Randy Altschuler	97,723	48.38
None	Blank/void/write-in	5,968	2.95
Total votes		202,007	100

== District 2 ==
2010 New York's 2nd congressional district election
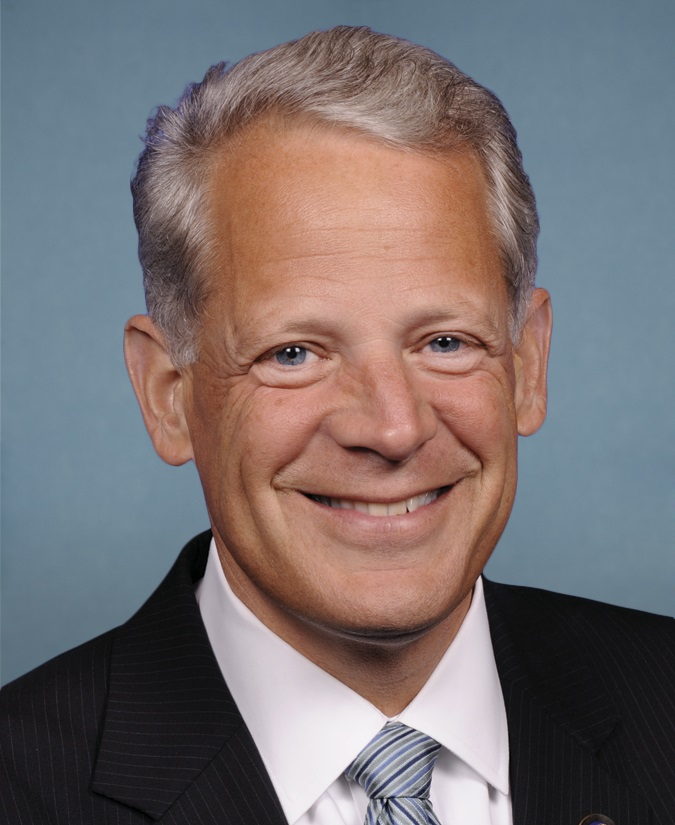

Nominee	Steve Israel	John B. Gomez
Party	Democratic	Republican
Popular vote	94,694	72,115
Percentage	54.0%	41.1%
- County results Israel: 50–60% 60–70%
U.S. Representative before election
Steve Israel
Democratic
Elected U.S. Representative
Steve Israel
Democratic

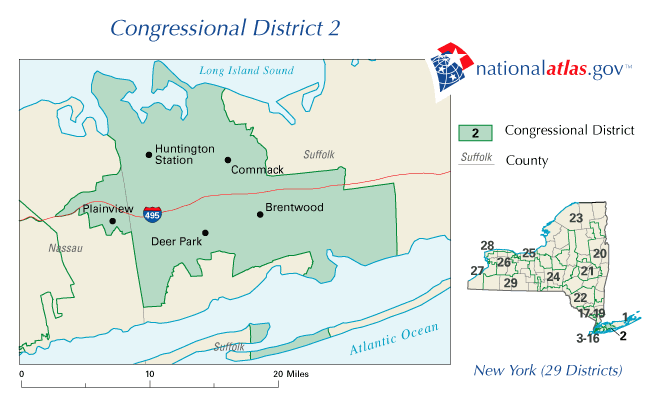

Democratic, Working Families and Independence Party incumbent Steve Israel ran for reelection, challenged by Republican and Conservative Party nominee John Gomez and Constitution Party nominee Anthony Tolda. Gomez, a good friend of author Mark Levin, was a favorite of the Tea Party movement. An attorney and former radio personality, he was encouraged to run by Sean Hannity, a childhood friend. Gomez was endorsed by Alaska Governor Sarah Palin. Israel won the general election on November 2, 2010.

- Race profile at The New York Times

=== Predictions ===
Source	Ranking	As of
The Cook Political Report	Safe D	November 1, 2010
Rothenberg	Safe D	November 1, 2010
Sabato's Crystal Ball	Safe D	November 1, 2010
RCP	Likely D	November 1, 2010
CQ Politics	Safe D	October 28, 2010
The New York Times	Safe D	November 1, 2010
FiveThirtyEight	Safe D	November 1, 2010

New York's 2nd congressional district election, 2010
Party	Candidate	Votes	%
Democratic	Steve Israel	84,211	48.04
Working Families	Steve Israel	4,130	2.36
Independence	Steve Israel	6,353	3.62
Total	Steve Israel (incumbent)	94,694	54.02
Republican	John B. Gomez	58,590	33.42
Conservative	John B. Gomez	13,525	7.72
Total	John B. Gomez	72,115	41.14
Constitution	Anthony Tolda	1,258	0.72
None	Blank/void/write-in	7,227	4.12
Total votes		175,294	100

== District 3 ==
2010 New York's 3rd congressional district election
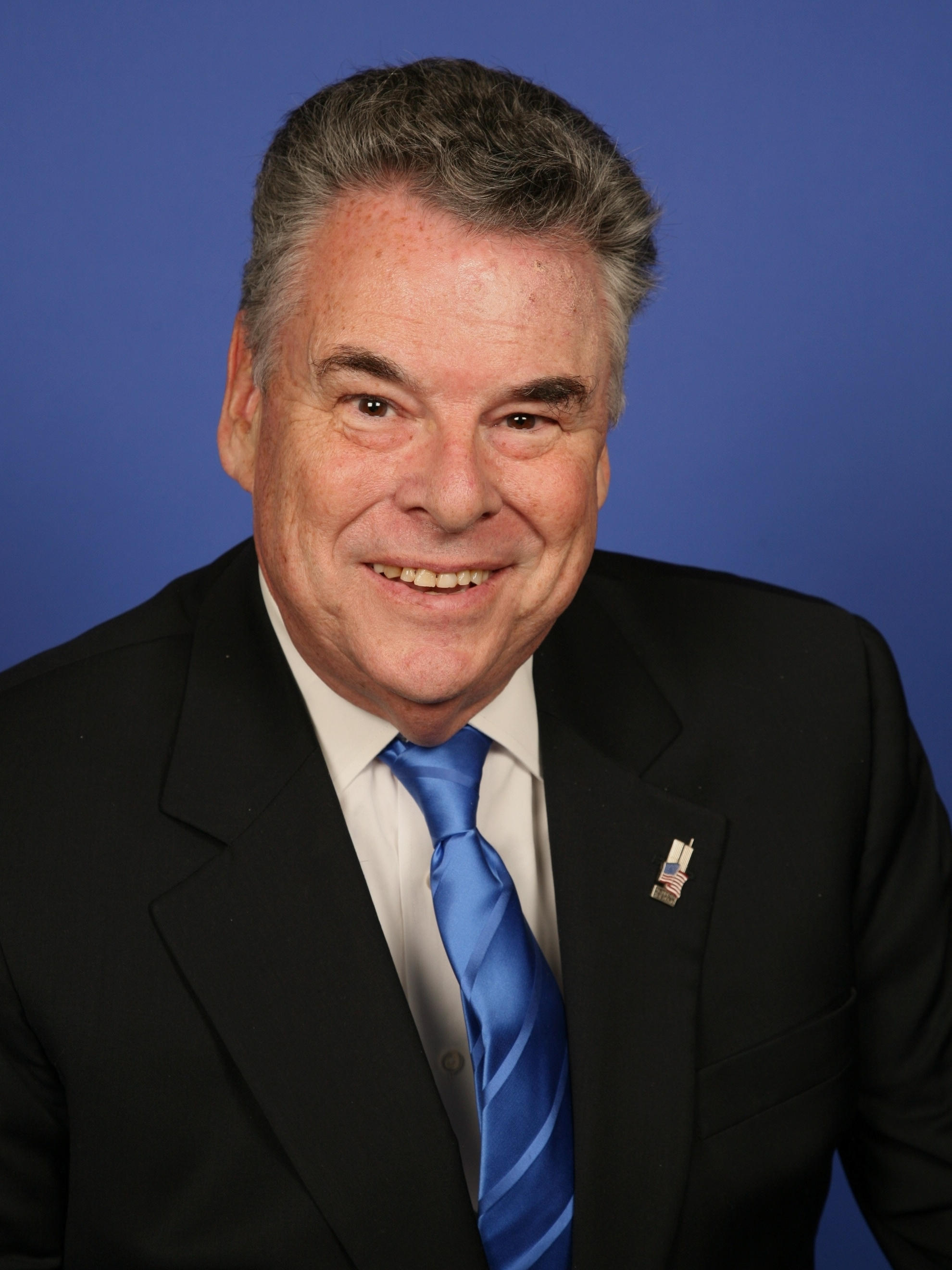

Nominee	Peter T. King	Howard A. Kudler
Party	Republican	Democratic
Popular vote	131,674	51,346
Percentage	68.6%	26.8%
- County results King: 70–80%
U.S. Representative before election
Peter T. King
Republican
Elected U.S. Representative
Peter T. King
Republican

Republican, Conservative, Independence and Tax Revolt Party incumbent Peter T. King ran for reelection, challenged by Democratic nominee Howard Kudler. The district was located in Nassau County on Long Island and was considered a safe Republican district. King won reelection on November 2, 2010.

- Race ranking and details from CQ Politics
- Campaign contributions from OpenSecrets
- Race profile at The New York Times

=== Predictions ===
Source	Ranking	As of
The Cook Political Report	Safe R	November 1, 2010
Rothenberg	Safe R	November 1, 2010
Sabato's Crystal Ball	Safe R	November 1, 2010
RCP	Safe R	November 1, 2010
CQ Politics	Safe R	October 28, 2010
The New York Times	Safe R	November 1, 2010
FiveThirtyEight	Safe R	November 1, 2010

New York's 3rd congressional district election, 2010
Party	Candidate	Votes	%
Democratic	Howard A. Kudler	51,346	26.75
Republican	Peter T. King	109,039	56.81
Independence	Peter T. King	7,443	3.88
Conservative	Peter T. King	15,192	7.91
Total	Peter T. King (incumbent)	131,674	68.60
None	Blank/void/write-in	8,925	4.65
Total votes		191,945	100

== District 4 ==
2010 New York's 4th congressional district election
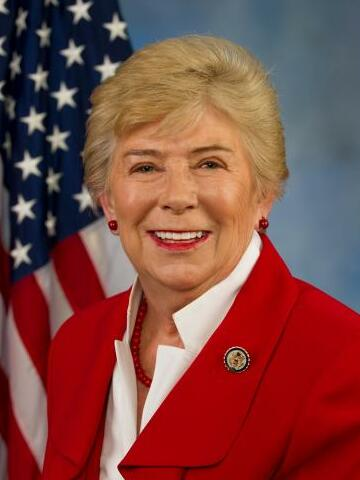

Nominee	Carolyn McCarthy	Francis X. Becker, Jr.
Party	Democratic	Republican
Popular vote	94,483	81,718
Percentage	52.0%	45.0%
- County results Mccarthy: 50–60%
U.S. Representative before election
Carolyn McCarthy
Democratic
Elected U.S. Representative
Carolyn McCarthy
Democratic

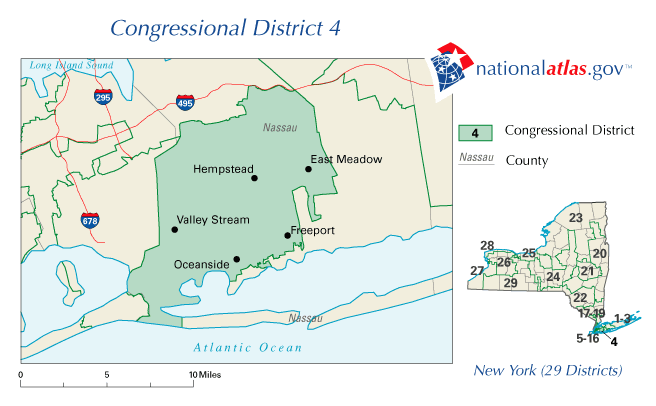

Democratic and Working Families incumbent Carolyn McCarthy was challenged by Republican, Conservative, Independence and Tax Revolt Party nominee Fran Becker. McCarthy won reelection on November 2, 2010.

- Race ranking and details from CQ Politics
- Campaign contributions from OpenSecrets
- Race profile at The New York Times

=== Polling ===
Poll source	Dates administered	Carolyn McCarthy (D)	Fran Becker (R)	Undecided
McLaughlin & Associates	October 6, 2010	46%	45%	-

==== Predictions ====
Source	Ranking	As of
The Cook Political Report	Likely D	November 1, 2010
Rothenberg	Safe D	November 1, 2010
Sabato's Crystal Ball	Safe D	November 1, 2010
RCP	Likely D	November 1, 2010
CQ Politics	Likely D	October 28, 2010
The New York Times	Safe D	November 1, 2010
FiveThirtyEight	Safe D	November 1, 2010

=== Result ===
New York's 4th congressional district election, 2010
Party	Candidate	Votes	%
Democratic	Carolyn McCarthy	89,743	49.37
Working Families	Carolyn McCarthy	4,740	2.61
Total	Carolyn McCarthy (incumbent)	94,483	51.98
Republican	Francis X. Becker, Jr.	69,323	38.14
Independence	Francis X. Becker, Jr.	2,940	1.62
Conservative	Francis X. Becker, Jr.	9,455	5.20
Total	Francis X. Becker, Jr.	81,718	44.95
None	Blank/void/write-in	8,925	4.65
Total votes		181,782	100

== District 5 ==
2010 New York's 5th congressional district election
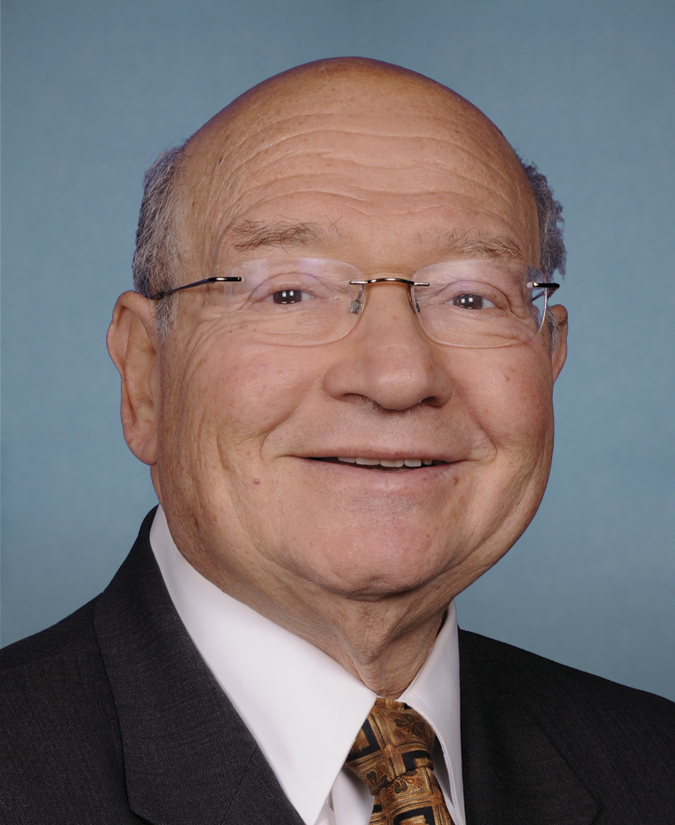

Nominee	Gary L. Ackerman	James Milano
Party	Democratic	Republican
Popular vote	72,239	41,493
Percentage	59.0%	33.9%
U.S. Representative before election
Gary L. Ackerman
Democratic
Elected U.S. Representative
Gary L. Ackerman
Democratic

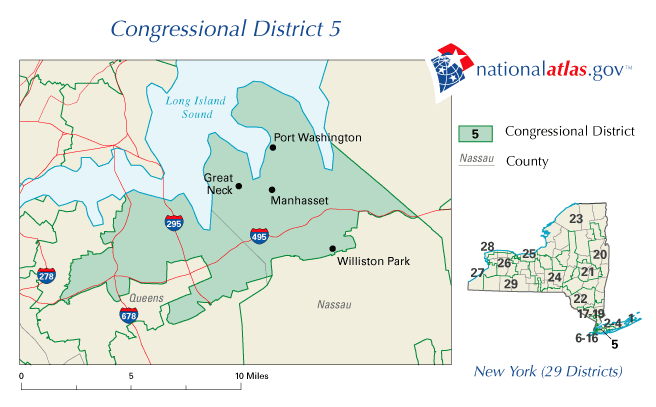

Democratic, Working Families and Independence incumbent Gary Ackerman was challenged by Republican and Conservative Party nominee Dr. James Milano, and Libertarian and Tax Revolt Party nominee Elizabeth Berney. The district, which stretched from eastern Queens across the Town of North Hempstead, was historically Democratic, and Ackerman won the general election on November 2, 2010.

- Race ranking and details from CQ Politics
- Campaign contributions from OpenSecrets
- Race profile at The New York Times

=== Predictions ===
Source	Ranking	As of
The Cook Political Report	Safe D	November 1, 2010
Rothenberg	Safe D	November 1, 2010
Sabato's Crystal Ball	Safe D	November 1, 2010
RCP	Safe D	November 1, 2010
CQ Politics	Safe D	October 28, 2010
The New York Times	Safe D	November 1, 2010
FiveThirtyEight	Safe D	November 1, 2010

New York's 5th congressional district election, 2010
Party	Candidate	Votes	%
Democratic	Gary L. Ackerman	66,564	54.37
Working Families	Gary L. Ackerman	3,323	2.71
Independence	Gary L. Ackerman	2,352	1.92
Total	Gary L. Ackerman (incumbent)	72,239	59.00
Republican	James Milano	36,861	30.11
Conservative	James Milano	4,632	3.78
Total	James Milano	41,493	33.89
Tax Revolt Party	Elizabeth Berney	798	0.65
None	Blank/void/write-in	7,909	6.46
Total votes		122,439	100

== District 6 ==
2010 New York's 6th congressional district election
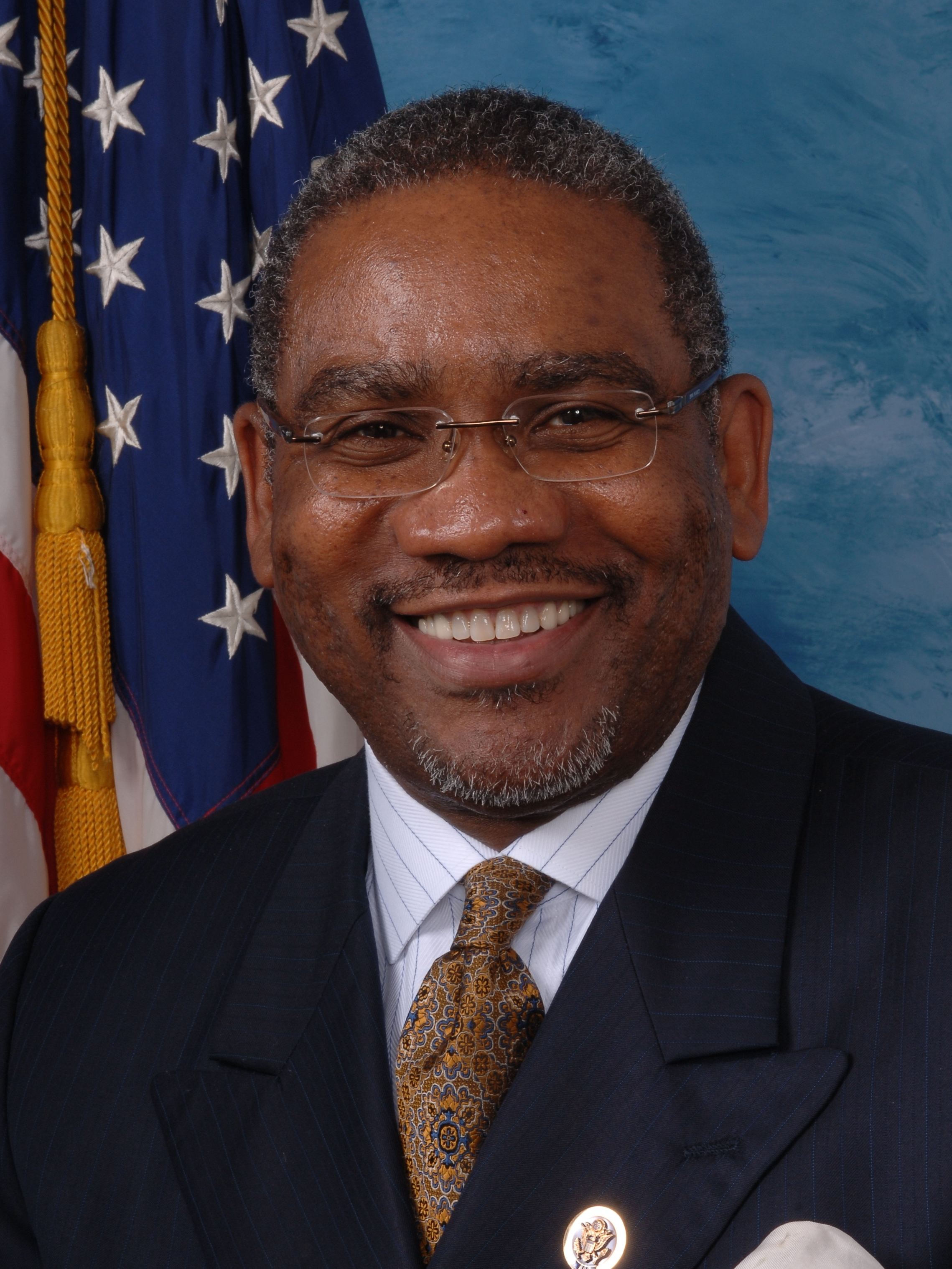

Nominee	Gregory Meeks	Asher E. Taub
Party	Democratic	Republican
Popular vote	85,096	11,826
Percentage	76.3%	10.6%
U.S. Representative before election
Gregory Meeks
Democratic
Elected U.S. Representative
Gregory Meeks
Democratic

Democratic incumbent Gregory Meeks ran for reelection, challenged by Republican and Conservative Party nominee Asher Taub. Meeks won the general election on November 2, 2010.

- Race ranking and details from CQ Politics
- Campaign contributions from OpenSecrets
- Race profile at The New York Times

=== Predictions ===
Source	Ranking	As of
The Cook Political Report	Safe D	November 1, 2010
Rothenberg	Safe D	November 1, 2010
Sabato's Crystal Ball	Safe D	November 1, 2010
RCP	Safe D	November 1, 2010
CQ Politics	Safe D	October 28, 2010
The New York Times	Safe D	November 1, 2010
FiveThirtyEight	Safe D	November 1, 2010

New York's 6th congressional district election, 2010
Party	Candidate	Votes	%
Democratic	Gregory Meeks (incumbent)	85,096	76.27
Republican	Asher E. Taub	10,057	9.01
Conservative	Asher E. Taub	1,769	1.59
Total	Asher E. Taub	11,826	10.60
None	Blank/void/write-in	14,651	13.13
Total votes		111,573	100

== District 7 ==
2010 New York's 7th congressional district election
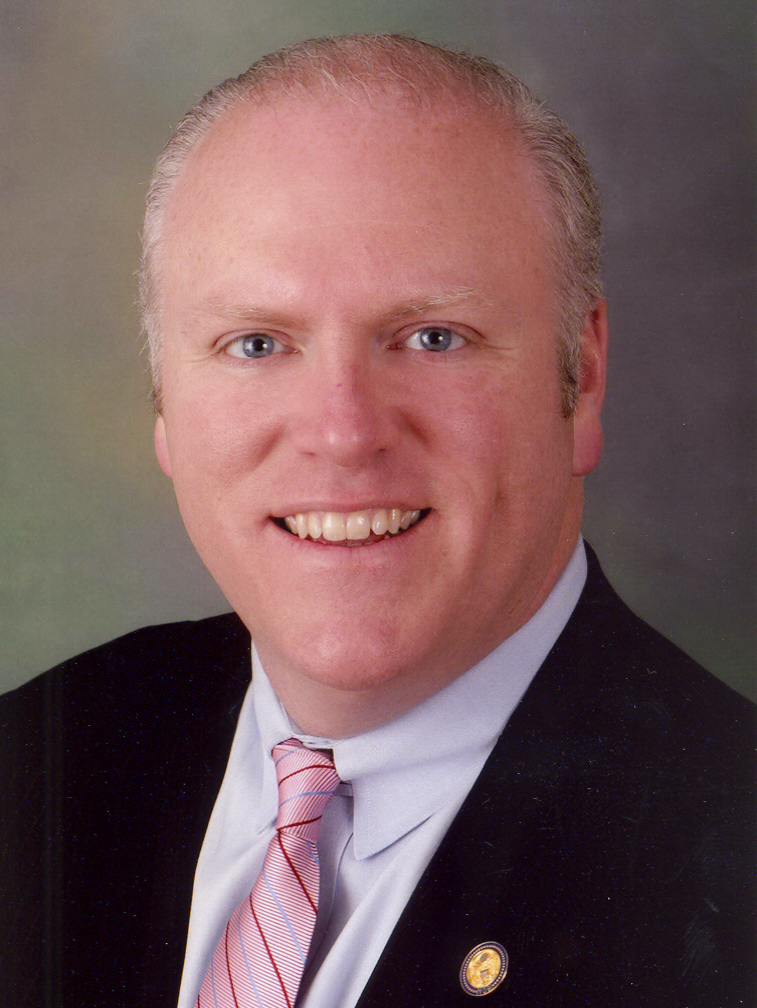

Nominee	Joseph Crowley	Kenneth A. Reynolds
Party	Democratic	Republican
Popular vote	71,247	16,145
Percentage	72.7%	16.5%
U.S. Representative before election
Joseph Crowley
Democratic
Elected U.S. Representative
Joseph Crowley
Democratic

Democratic and Working Families incumbent Joe Crowley ran for reelection, challenged by Republican and Conservative Party nominee Ken Reynolds and Green Party nominee Anthony Gronowicz. Crowley won the general election.

- Race ranking and details from CQ Politics
- Campaign contributions from OpenSecrets
- Race profile at The New York Times

=== Predictions ===
Source	Ranking	As of
The Cook Political Report	Safe D	November 1, 2010
Rothenberg	Safe D	November 1, 2010
Sabato's Crystal Ball	Safe D	November 1, 2010
RCP	Safe D	November 1, 2010
CQ Politics	Safe D	October 28, 2010
The New York Times	Safe D	November 1, 2010
FiveThirtyEight	Safe D	November 1, 2010

New York's 7th congressional district election, 2010
Party	Candidate	Votes	%
Democratic	Joseph Crowley	66,223	67.59
Working Families	Joseph Crowley	5,024	5.13
Totals	Joseph Crowley (incumbent)	71,247	72.72
Republican	Kenneth A. Reynolds	13,751	14.04
Conservative	Kenneth A. Reynolds	2,394	2.44
Total	Kenneth A. Reynolds	16,145	16.48
Green	Anthony Gronowicz	1,038	1.06
None	Blank/void/write-in	9,541	9.74
Total votes		97,971	100

== District 8 ==
2010 New York's 8th congressional district election
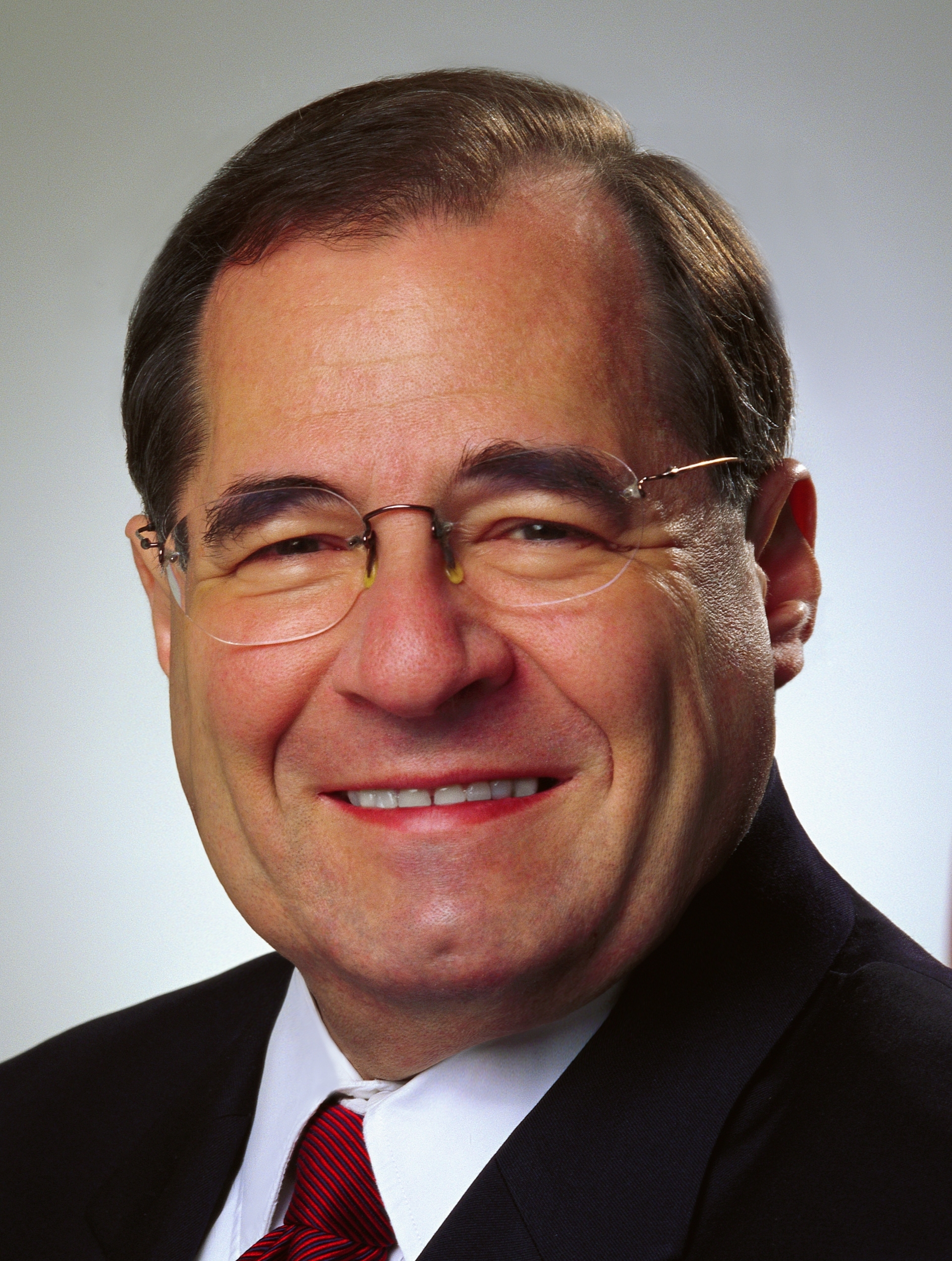

Nominee	Jerrold L. Nadler	Susan L. Kone
Party	Democratic	Republican
Popular vote	98,839	31,996
Percentage	69.1%	22.4%
U.S. Representative before election
Jerrold L. Nadler
Democratic
Elected U.S. Representative
Jerrold L. Nadler
Democratic

Democratic and Working Families incumbent Jerry Nadler ran for reelection, challenged by Republican and Conservative Party nominee Susan Kone. The district covers parts of Brooklyn and Manhattan. Nadler won the general election on November 2, 2010.

- Race ranking and details from CQ Politics
- Campaign contributions from OpenSecrets
- Race profile at The New York Times

=== Predictions ===
Source	Ranking	As of
The Cook Political Report	Safe D	November 1, 2010
Rothenberg	Safe D	November 1, 2010
Sabato's Crystal Ball	Safe D	November 1, 2010
RCP	Safe D	November 1, 2010
CQ Politics	Safe D	October 28, 2010
The New York Times	Safe D	November 1, 2010
FiveThirtyEight	Safe D	November 1, 2010

New York's 8th congressional district election, 2010
Party	Candidate	Votes	%
Democratic	Jerrold L. Nadler	88,758	62.01
Working Families	Jerrold L. Nadler	10,081	7.04
Totals	Jerrold L. Nadler (incumbent)	98,839	69.06
Republican	Susan L. Kone	29,514	20.62
Conservative	Susan L. Kone	2,482	1.73
Total	Susan L. Kone	31,996	22.36
None	Blank/void/write-in	12,291	8.59
Total votes		143,126	100

== District 9 ==
2010 New York's 9th congressional district election
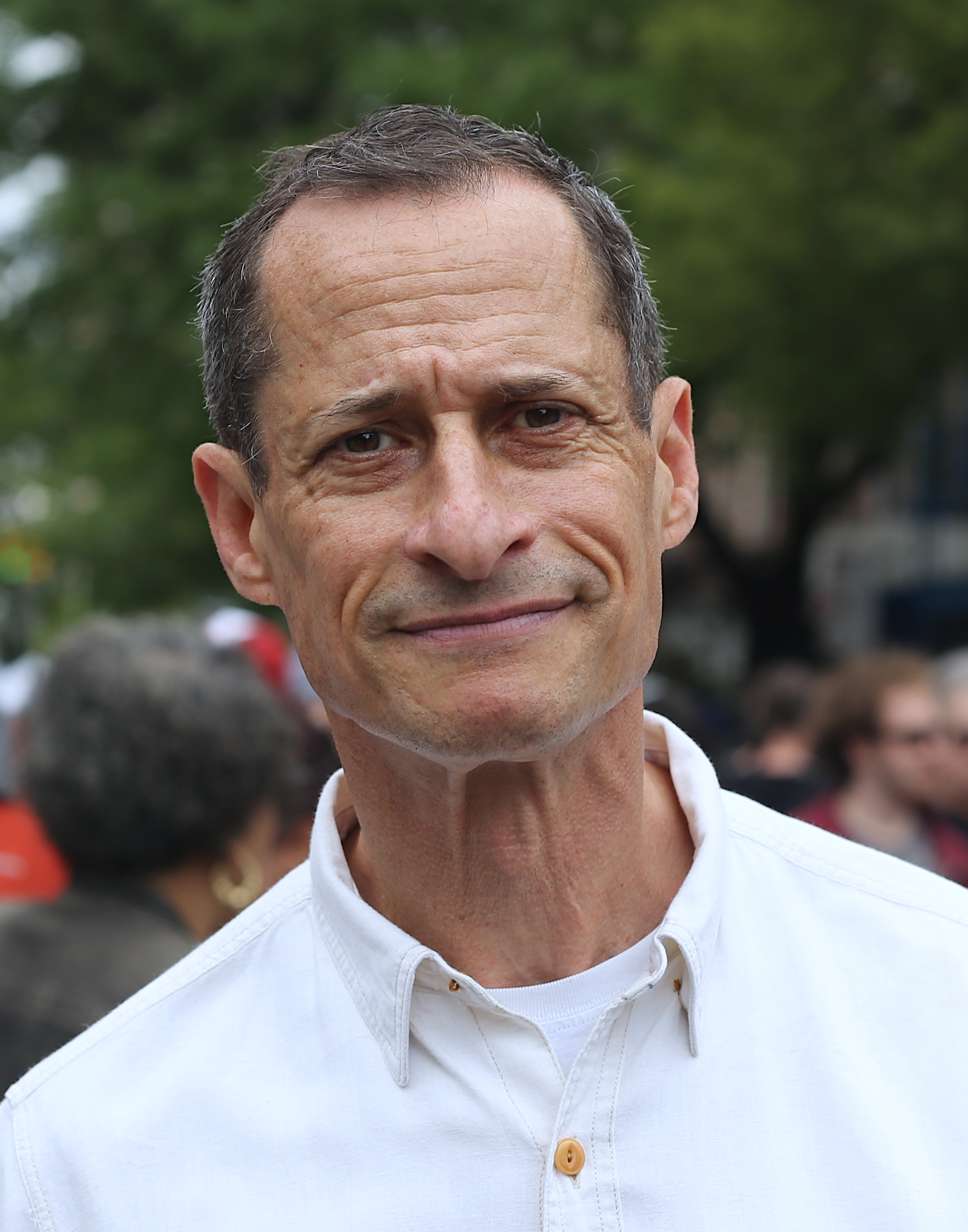

Nominee	Anthony Weiner	Robert L. Turner
Party	Democratic	Republican
Popular vote	67,011	43,129
Percentage	57.0%	36.7%
U.S. Representative before election
Anthony Weiner
Democratic
Elected U.S. Representative
Anthony Weiner
Democratic

Democratic, Working Families and Independence Party incumbent Anthony Weiner ran for reelection, challenged by Republican and Conservative Party nominee Bob Turner. Weiner won the general election on November 2, 2010. Later, after Weiner resigned due to a sex scandal, Turner won the seat in September 2011.

- Race ranking and details from CQ Politics
- Campaign contributions from OpenSecrets
- Race profile at The New York Times

=== Predictions ===
Source	Ranking	As of
The Cook Political Report	Safe D	November 1, 2010
Rothenberg	Safe D	November 1, 2010
Sabato's Crystal Ball	Safe D	November 1, 2010
RCP	Safe D	November 1, 2010
CQ Politics	Safe D	October 28, 2010
The New York Times	Safe D	November 1, 2010
FiveThirtyEight	Safe D	November 1, 2010

New York's 9th congressional district election, 2010
Party	Candidate	Votes	%
Democratic	Anthony Weiner	60,879	51.76
Working Families	Anthony Weiner	3,332	2.83
Independence	Anthony Weiner	2,800	2.38
Totals	Anthony Weiner (incumbent)	67,011	56.98
Republican	Robert L. Turner	37,750	32.10
Conservative	Robert L. Turner	5,379	4.57
Total	Robert L. Turner	43,129	36.67
None	Blank/void/write-in	7,473	6.35
Total votes		117,613	100

== District 10 ==
2010 New York's 10th congressional district election
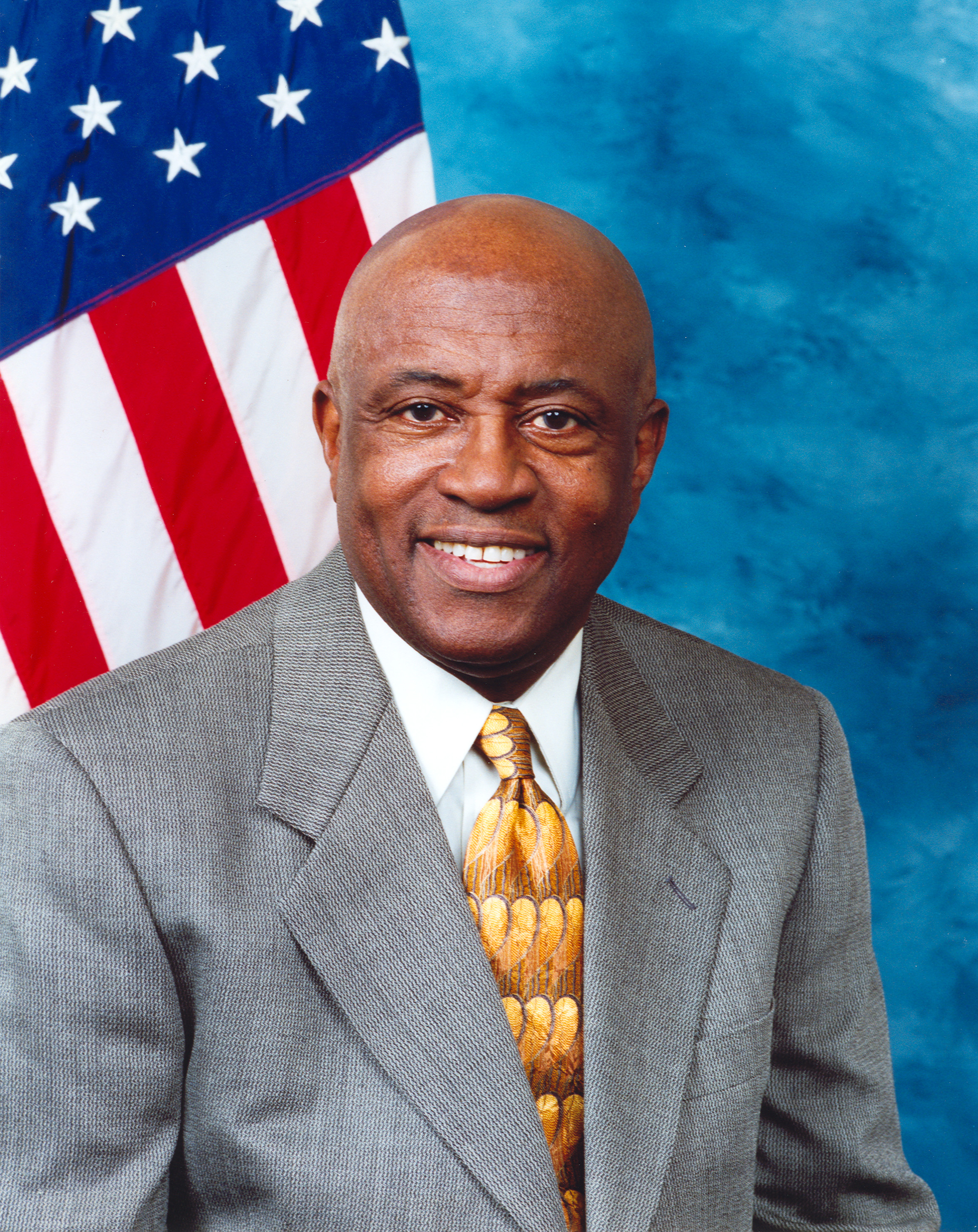

Nominee	Edolphus Towns	Diana Muniz
Party	Democratic	Republican
Popular vote	95,485	7,419
Percentage	79.7%	6.2%
U.S. Representative before election
Edolphus Towns
Democratic
Elected U.S. Representative
Edolphus Towns
Democratic

Democratic incumbent Ed Towns ran for reelection, challenged by Republican nominee Diana Muñiz and Conservative Party nominee Ernest Johnson. Towns won the general election on November 2, 2010.

- Race ranking and details from CQ Politics
- Campaign contributions from OpenSecrets
- Race profile at The New York Times

=== Predictions ===
Source	Ranking	As of
The Cook Political Report	Safe D	November 1, 2010
Rothenberg	Safe D	November 1, 2010
Sabato's Crystal Ball	Safe D	November 1, 2010
RCP	Safe D	November 1, 2010
CQ Politics	Safe D	October 28, 2010
The New York Times	Safe D	November 1, 2010
FiveThirtyEight	Safe D	November 1, 2010

New York's 10th congressional district election, 2010
Party	Candidate	Votes	%
Democratic	Edolphus Towns (incumbent)	95,485	79.66
Republican	Diana Muniz	7,419	6.19
Conservative	Ernest Johnson	1,853	1.55
None	Blank/void/write-in	15,115	12.61
Total votes		119,872	100

== District 11 ==
2010 New York's 11th congressional district election
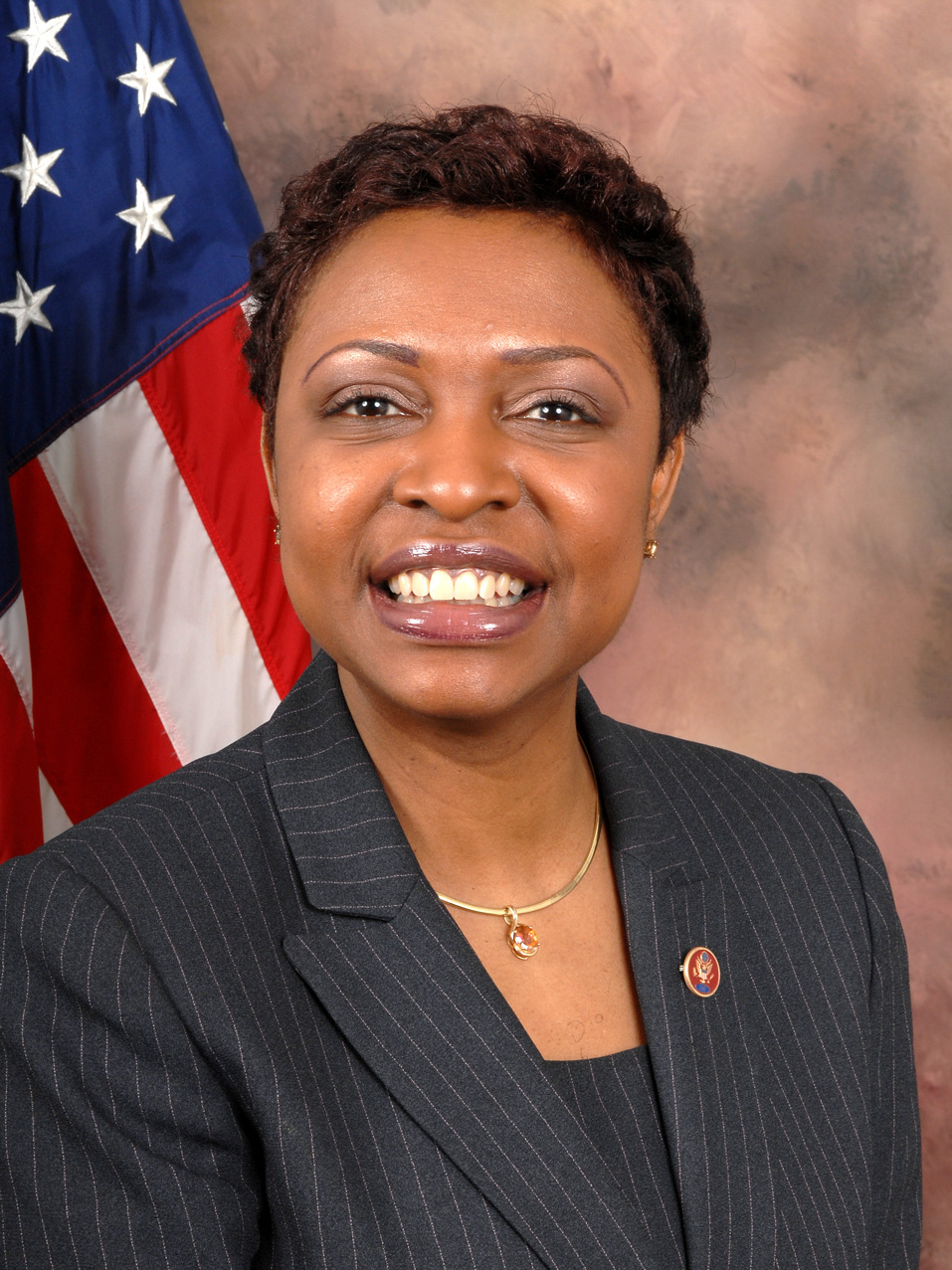

Nominee	Yvette Clarke	Hugh C. Carr
Party	Democratic	Republican
Popular vote	104,297	10,858
Percentage	83.5%	8.7%
U.S. Representative before election
Yvette Clarke
Democratic
Elected U.S. Representative
Yvette Clarke
Democratic

Democratic and Working Families incumbent Yvette Clarke ran for reelection, challenged by Republican and Conservative Party nominee Hugh C. Carr. The 11th district is wholly within the borough of Brooklyn. Clarke won the general election on November 2, 2010.

- Race ranking and details from CQ Politics
- Campaign contributions from OpenSecrets
- Race profile at The New York Times

=== Predictions ===
Source	Ranking	As of
The Cook Political Report	Safe D	November 1, 2010
Rothenberg	Safe D	November 1, 2010
Sabato's Crystal Ball	Safe D	November 1, 2010
RCP	Safe D	November 1, 2010
CQ Politics	Safe D	October 28, 2010
The New York Times	Safe D	November 1, 2010
FiveThirtyEight	Safe D	November 1, 2010

New York's 11th congressional district election, 2010
Party	Candidate	Votes	%
Democratic	Yvette Clarke	89,973	72.03
Working Families	Yvette Clarke	14,324	11.47
Totals	Yvette Clarke (incumbent)	104,297	83.50
Republican	Hugh C. Carr	9,119	7.30
Conservative	Hugh C. Carr	1,739	1.39
Total	Hugh C. Carr	10,858	8.69
None	Blank/void/write-in	9,759	7.81
Total votes		124,914	100

== District 12 ==
2010 New York's 12th congressional district election
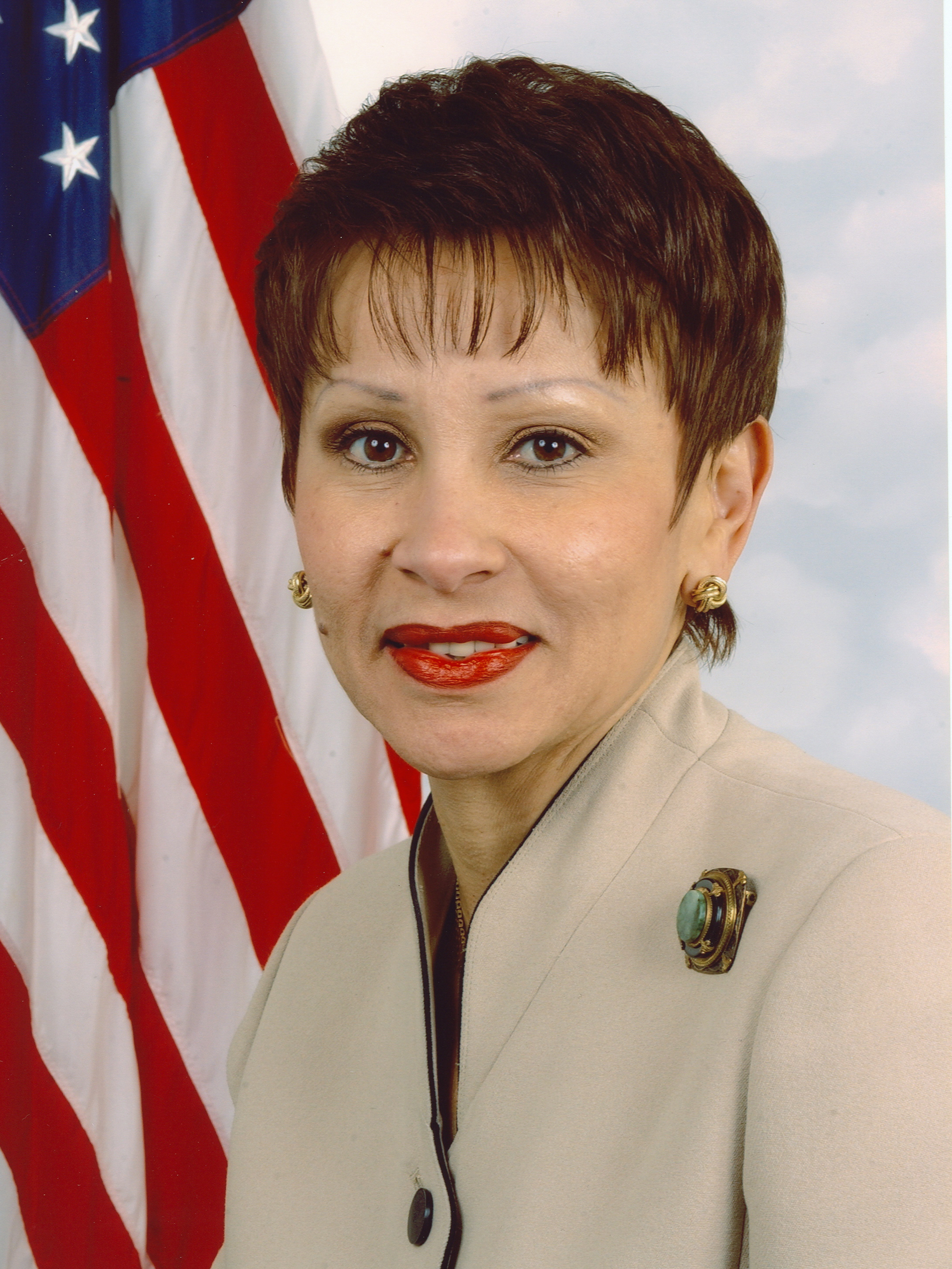

Nominee	Nydia Velázquez	Alice Gaffney
Party	Democratic	Conservative
Popular vote	68,624	4,482
Percentage	79.1%	5.2%
U.S. Representative before election
Nydia Velázquez
Democratic
Elected U.S. Representative
Nydia Velázquez
Democratic

Democratic and Working Families incumbent Nydia Velázquez ran for reelection, challenged by Conservative Party nominee Alice Gaffney. Velázquez won the general election on November 2, 2010.

- Race ranking and details from CQ Politics
- Campaign contributions from OpenSecrets
- Race profile at The New York Times

=== Predictions ===
Source	Ranking	As of
The Cook Political Report	Safe D	November 1, 2010
Rothenberg	Safe D	November 1, 2010
Sabato's Crystal Ball	Safe D	November 1, 2010
RCP	Safe D	November 1, 2010
CQ Politics	Safe D	October 28, 2010
The New York Times	Safe D	November 1, 2010
FiveThirtyEight	Safe D	November 1, 2010

New York's 12th congressional district election, 2010
Party	Candidate	Votes	%
Democratic	Nydia Velázquez	60,586	69.84
Working Families	Nydia Velázquez	8,038	9.27
Totals	Nydia Velázquez (incumbent)	68,624	79.10
Conservative	Alice Gaffney	4,482	5.17
None	Blank/void/write-in	13,647	15.73
Total votes		86,753	100

== District 13 ==
2010 New York's 13th congressional district election
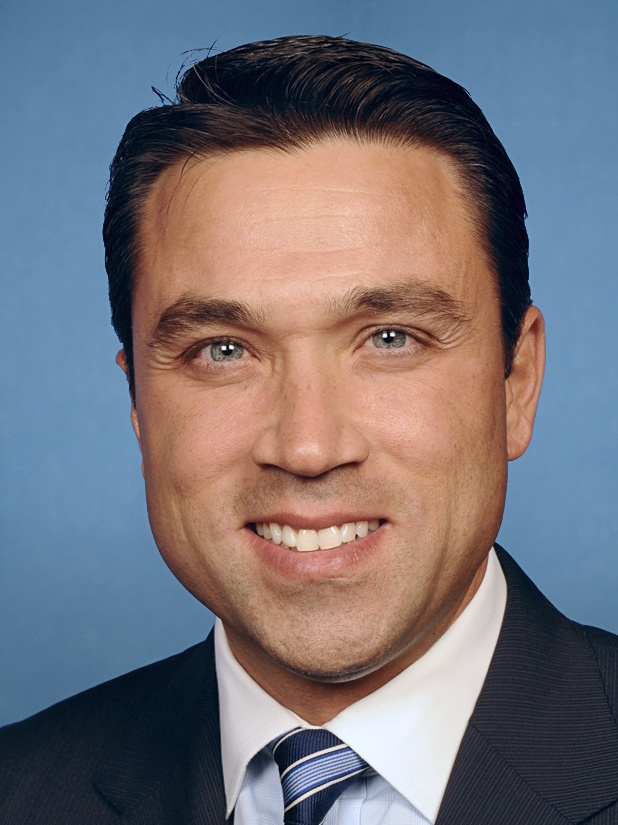

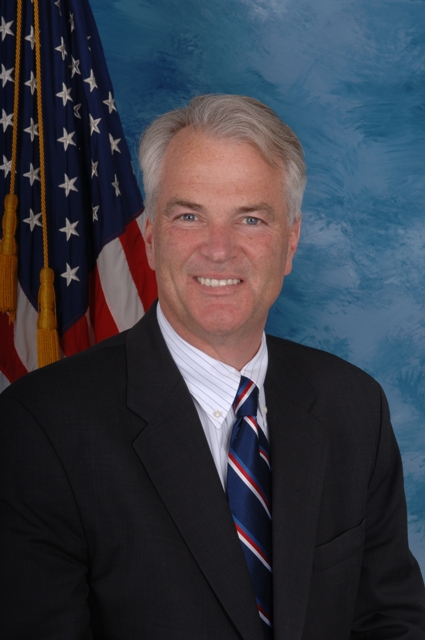
Nominee	Michael Grimm	Michael McMahon
Party	Republican	Democratic
Popular vote	65,026	60,773
Percentage	49.5%	46.2%
U.S. Representative before election
Michael McMahon
Democratic
Elected U.S. Representative
Michael Grimm
Republican

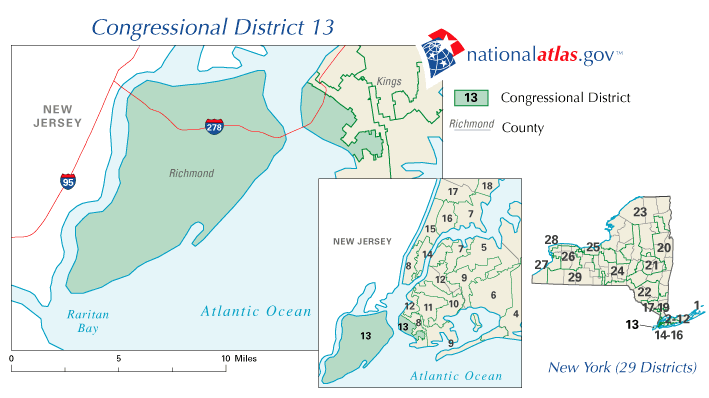

Democratic and Independence incumbent Michael McMahon was challenged by Republican and Conservative Party nominee Michael Grimm, a former FBI Special Agent, and Libertarian nominee Tom Vendittelli. The 13th district covers the entire Staten Island and parts of south Brooklyn.

In the Republican primary, Grimm ran against the director of government relations for the Climate Group Michael Allegretti. Vito Fossella had earlier been rumored to be considering a comeback, but did not run. Allegretti had the support of the Republican County Committees of Kings and Richmond Counties. Grimm had the support of the Conservative Party's county committees. According to an April 2010 Global Strategy Group poll, McMahon led Grimm and Allegretti 56% to 23% and 56% to 24%, respectively.

Grimm won the general election, unseating McMahon, on November 2, 2010.

- Race ranking and details from CQ Politics
- Campaign contributions from OpenSecrets
- Race profile at The New York Times

=== Polling ===
Poll source	Dates administered	Michael McMahon (D)	Michael Grimm (R)	Undecided
Barry Zeplowitz & Associates	September 22–23, 2010	46%	38%	16%
Global Strategy Group	September 19–22, 2010	51%	33%	16%
Global Strategy Group	April 7–11, 2010	56%	23%	20%

==== Predictions ====
Source	Ranking	As of
The Cook Political Report	Lean D	November 1, 2010
Rothenberg	Likely D	November 1, 2010
Sabato's Crystal Ball	Likely D	November 1, 2010
RCP	Tossup	November 1, 2010
CQ Politics	Lean D	October 28, 2010
The New York Times	Lean D	November 1, 2010
FiveThirtyEight	Likely D	November 1, 2010

=== Results ===
New York's 13th congressional district election, 2010
Party	Candidate	Votes	%
Democratic	Michael McMahon	56,412	42.92
Independence	Michael McMahon	4,361	3.32
Totals	Michael McMahon (incumbent)	60,773	46.24
Republican	Michael Grimm	55,822	42.47
Conservative	Michael Grimm	9,204	7.00
Total	Michael Grimm	65,026	49.48
Libertarian	Tom Vendittelli	929	0.71
None	Blank/void/write-in	13,647	15.73
Total votes		131,428	100

== District 14 ==
2010 New York's 14th congressional district election
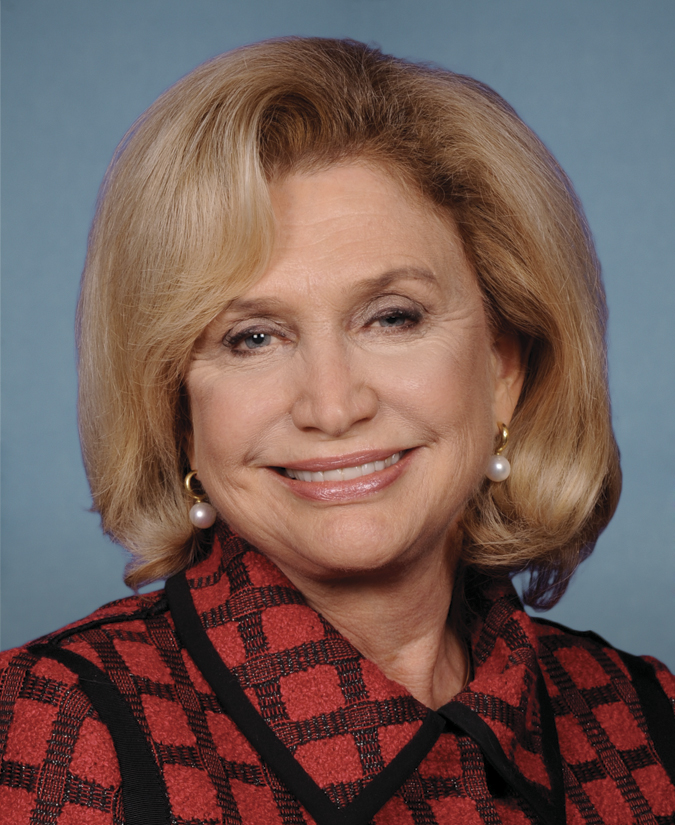

Nominee	Carolyn Maloney	David Ryan Brumberg
Party	Democratic	Republican
Popular vote	107,327	32,065
Percentage	71.3%	21.3%
U.S. Representative before election
Carolyn Maloney
Democratic
Elected U.S. Representative
Carolyn Maloney
Democratic

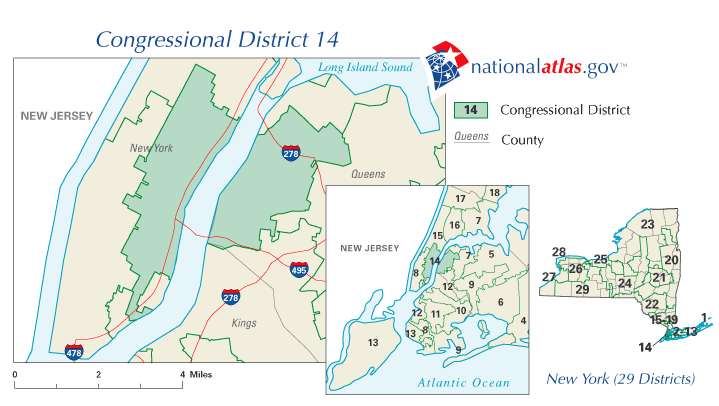

Democratic and Working Families incumbent Carolyn Maloney was challenged by Republican nominee David Ryan Brumberg, Conservative Party nominee Timothy J. Healy, and Independence Party nominee Dino L. LaVerghetta. Maloney considered running for Senate against Kirsten Gillibrand, but decided against it. In the Democratic primary, she defeated Reshma Saujani.

Maloney was heavily favored, but the Republicans had held legislative seats in this district as recently as 2002. Maloney won the general election on November 2, 2010.

The district in on the Manhattan East Side and includes portions of Queens.

- Race ranking and details from CQ Politics
- Campaign contributions from OpenSecrets
- Race profile at The New York Times

=== Republican primary ===
==== Results ====
Republican primary results
Party	Candidate	Votes	%
Republican	David Ryan Brumberg	3,131	62.42
Republican	Dino L. LaVerghetta	1,374	27.39
Republican	Roger Blank	511	10.19
Total votes		5,016	100.0

=== Democratic primary ===
==== Results ====
Democratic primary results
Party	Candidate	Votes	%
Democratic	Carolyn Maloney (incumbent)	26,303	80.85
Democratic	Reshma Saujani	6,231	19.15
Total votes		32,534	100.00

=== Predictions ===
Source	Ranking	As of
The Cook Political Report	Safe D	November 1, 2010
Rothenberg	Safe D	November 1, 2010
Sabato's Crystal Ball	Safe D	November 1, 2010
RCP	Safe D	November 1, 2010
CQ Politics	Safe D	October 28, 2010
The New York Times	Safe D	November 1, 2010
FiveThirtyEight	Safe D	November 1, 2010

New York's 14th congressional district election, 2010
Party	Candidate	Votes	%
Democratic	Carolyn Maloney	98,953	65.76
Working Families	Carolyn Maloney	8,374	5.56
Totals	Carolyn Maloney (incumbent)	107,327	71.32
Republican	David Ryan Brumberg	32,065	21.31
Conservative	Timothy J. Healy	1,891	1.26
Independence	Dino L. LaVerghetta	1,617	1.07
None	Blank/void/write-in	7,581	5.04
Total votes		150,481	100

== District 15 ==
2010 New York's 15th congressional district election
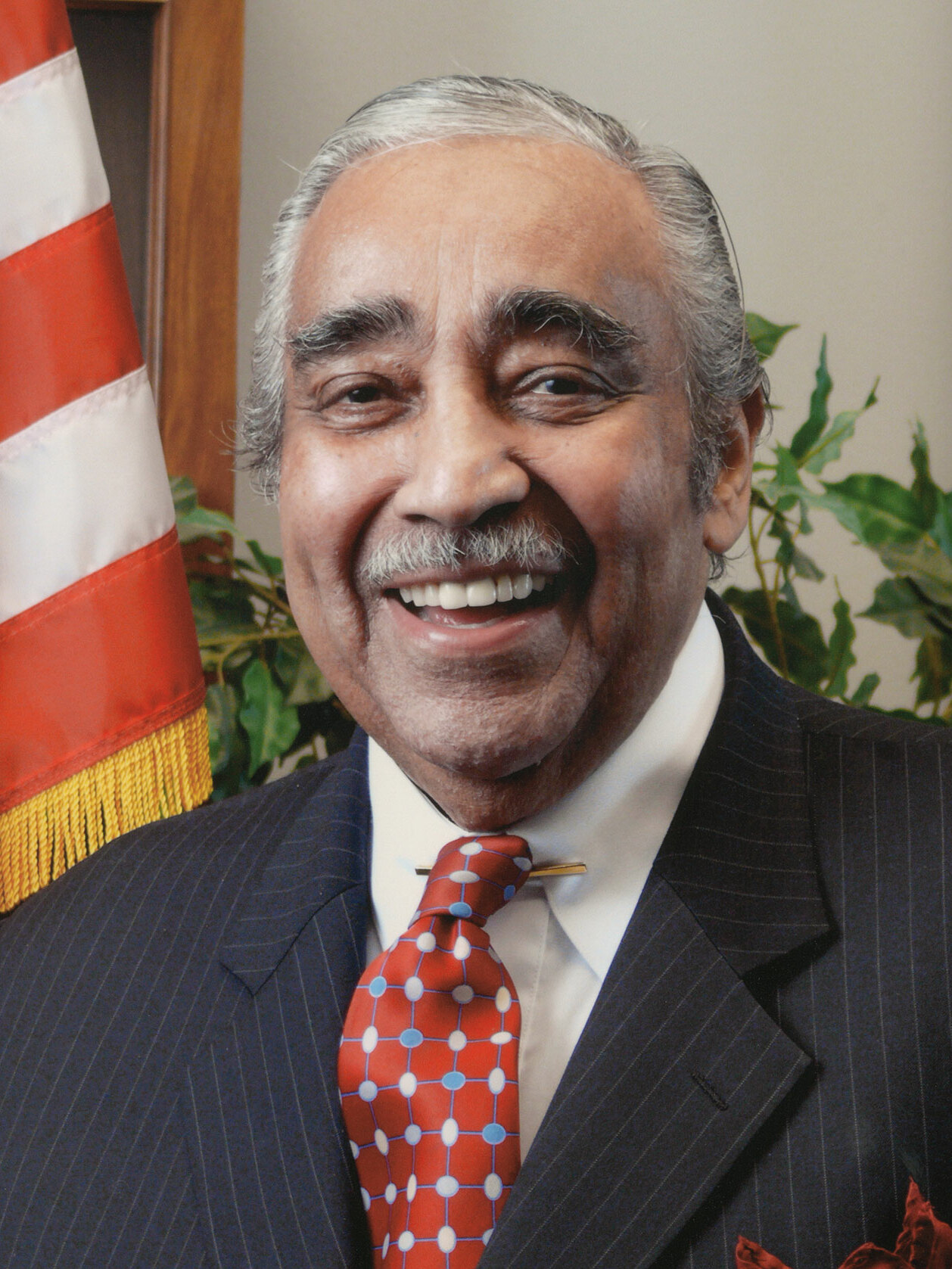

Nominee	Charles Rangel	Michel Faulkner	Craig Schley
Party	Democratic	Republican	Independence
Popular vote	91,225	11,754	7,803
Percentage	71.8%	9.3%	6.1%
U.S. Representative before election
Charles Rangel
Democratic
Elected U.S. Representative
Charles Rangel
Democratic

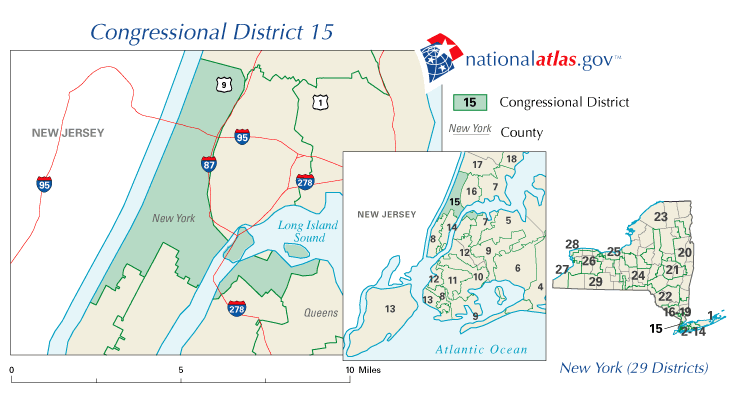

Democratic and Working Families incumbent Charles Rangel ran for reelection, challenged by Republican, Conservative and Jobs Now Party nominee Michel Faulkner, Independence and Vote People for Change Party nominee Craig Schley, and Socialist Worker nominee Roger Calero.

Rangel, who had served the Harlem-area district since 1971, faced a primary challenge from Adam Clayton Powell IV, Vincent Morgan and labor activist Jonathan Tasini.

Rangel won the general election on November 2, 2010.

- Race ranking and details from CQ Politics
- Campaign contributions from OpenSecrets
- Race profile at The New York Times

=== Predictions ===
Source	Ranking	As of
The Cook Political Report	Safe D	November 1, 2010
Rothenberg	Safe D	November 1, 2010
Sabato's Crystal Ball	Safe D	November 1, 2010
RCP	Safe D	November 1, 2010
CQ Politics	Safe D	October 28, 2010
The New York Times	Safe D	November 1, 2010
FiveThirtyEight	Safe D	November 1, 2010

New York's 15th congressional district election, 2010
Party	Candidate	Votes	%
Democratic	Charles Rangel	83,633	65.83
Working Families	Charles Rangel	7,592	5.98
Totals	Charles Rangel (incumbent)	91,225	71.80
Republican	Michel Faulkner	10,678	8.40
Conservative	Michel Faulkner	1,076	0.85
Total	Michel Faulkner	11,754	9.25
Independence	Craig Schley	6,865	5.40
Vote People for Change Party	Craig Schley	938	0.74
Totals	Craig Schley	7,803	6.14
Socialist Workers	Roger Calero	2,647	2.08
None	Blank/void/write-in	13,617	10.72
Total votes		127,046	100

== District 16 ==
2010 New York's 16th congressional district election
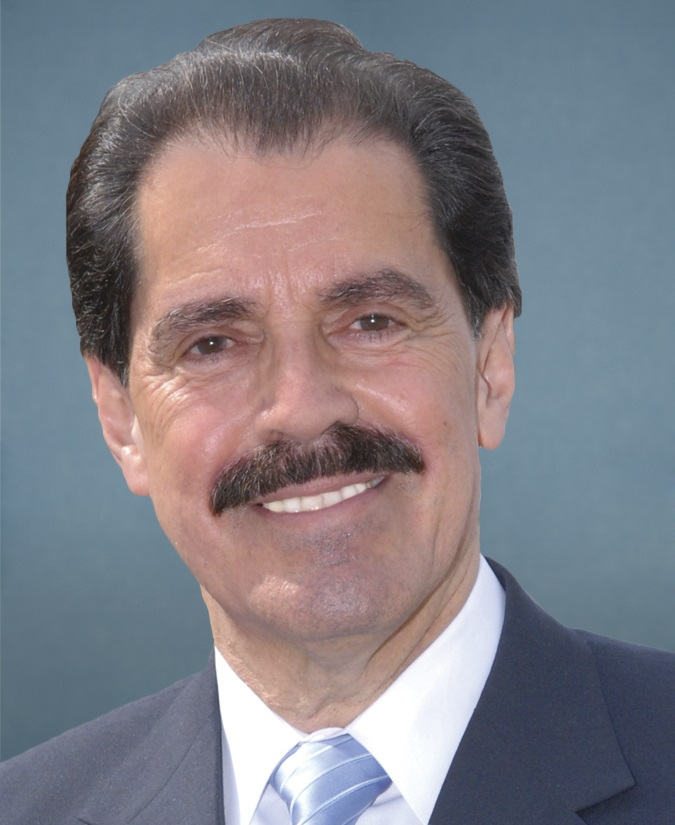

Nominee	Jose E. Serrano	Frank Della Valle
Party	Democratic	Republican
Popular vote	61,642	2,758
Percentage	86.4%	3.9%
U.S. Representative before election
Jose E. Serrano
Democratic
Elected U.S. Representative
Jose E. Serrano
Democratic

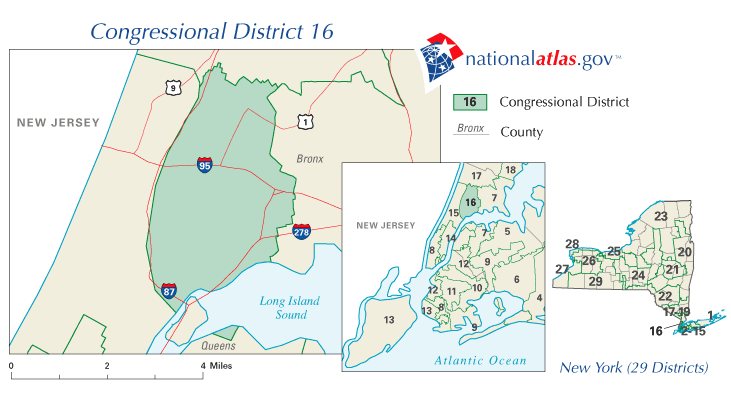

Democratic and Working Families incumbent Jose Serrano ran for reelection, challenged by Republican and Conservative Party nominee Frank Della Valle. The district lies entirely within the Bronx. Serrano won the general election on November 2, 2010.

- Race ranking and details from CQ Politics
- Campaign contributions from OpenSecrets
- Race profile at The New York Times

=== Predictions ===
Source	Ranking	As of
The Cook Political Report	Safe D	November 1, 2010
Rothenberg	Safe D	November 1, 2010
Sabato's Crystal Ball	Safe D	November 1, 2010
RCP	Safe D	November 1, 2010
CQ Politics	Safe D	October 28, 2010
The New York Times	Safe D	November 1, 2010
FiveThirtyEight	Safe D	November 1, 2010

New York's 16th congressional district election, 2010
Party	Candidate	Votes	%
Democratic	Jose E. Serrano	58,478	81.96
Working Families	Jose E. Serrano	3,164	4.43
Totals	Jose E. Serrano (incumbent)	61,642	86.40
Republican	Frank Della Valle	2,257	3.16
Conservative	Frank Della Valle	501	0.70
Total	Frank Della Valle	2,758	3.87
None	Blank/void/write-in	6,949	9.74
Total votes		71,349	100

== District 17 ==
2010 New York's 17th congressional district election
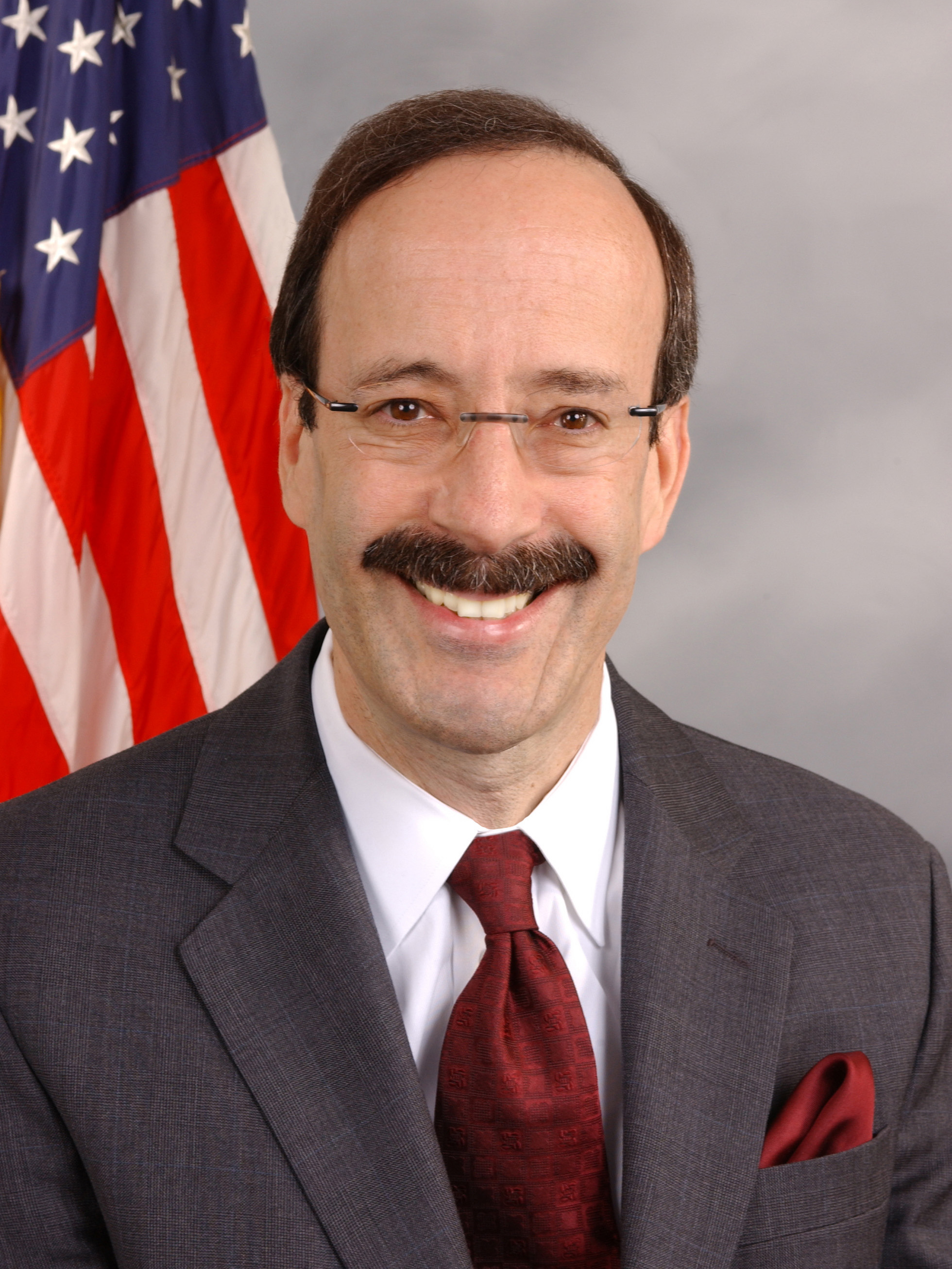

Nominee	Eliot Engel	Anthony Mele
Party	Democratic	Republican
Popular vote	95,349	29,802
Percentage	66.9%	20.9%
U.S. Representative before election
Eliot Engel
Democratic
Elected U.S. Representative
Eliot Engel
Democratic

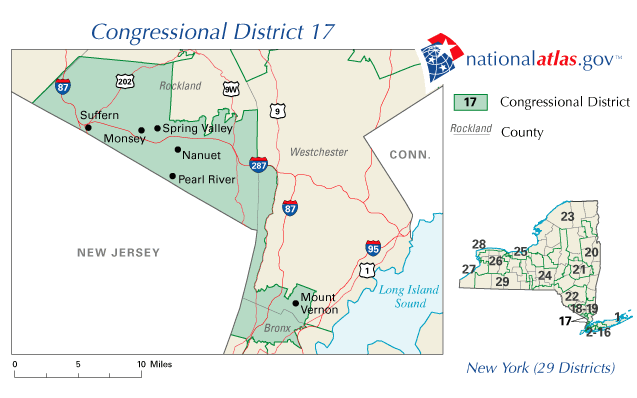

Democratic and Working Families incumbent Eliot Engel ran for reelection, challenged by Republican nominee Anthony Mele and Conservative Party nominee York Kleinhandler. The district encompasses parts of the Bronx, Westchester, and Rockland Counties.

Engel won 79% of the vote in 2008, 76% in 2006 and 2004, and 62% in 2002 when he defeated Rockland County Executive C. Scott Vanderhoef. In 2000, he fought back the primary challenge of State Senator Larry Seabrook. Election experts predicted that Engel would post similar numbers in 2010.

Army veteran York Kleinhandler received GOP and Conservative Party endorsements from the party committees in the Bronx, Rockland County and Westchester County. Kleinhandler faced a Republican primary of his own against Tea Party candidate Anthony Mele in September, a primary that brought local Republicans to physical blows and led to police involvement. He was also dogged by accusations "for predatory business practices against senior citizens" in Florida.

Engel won the general election on November 2, 2010.

- Race ranking and details from CQ Politics
- Campaign contributions from OpenSecrets
- Race profile at The New York Times

=== Predictions ===
Source	Ranking	As of
The Cook Political Report	Safe D	November 1, 2010
Rothenberg	Safe D	November 1, 2010
Sabato's Crystal Ball	Safe D	November 1, 2010
RCP	Safe D	November 1, 2010
CQ Politics	Safe D	October 28, 2010
The New York Times	Safe D	November 1, 2010
FiveThirtyEight	Safe D	November 1, 2010

New York's 17th congressional district election, 2010
Party	Candidate	Votes	%
Democratic	Eliot Engel	89,698	62.93
Working Families	Eliot Engel	5,651	3.96
Totals	Eliot Engel (incumbent)	95,349	66.90
Republican	Anthony Mele	29,802	20.91
Conservative	York Kleinhandler	5,664	3.97
None	Blank/void/write-in	11,717	8.22
Total votes		142,532	100

== District 18 ==
2010 New York's 18th congressional district election
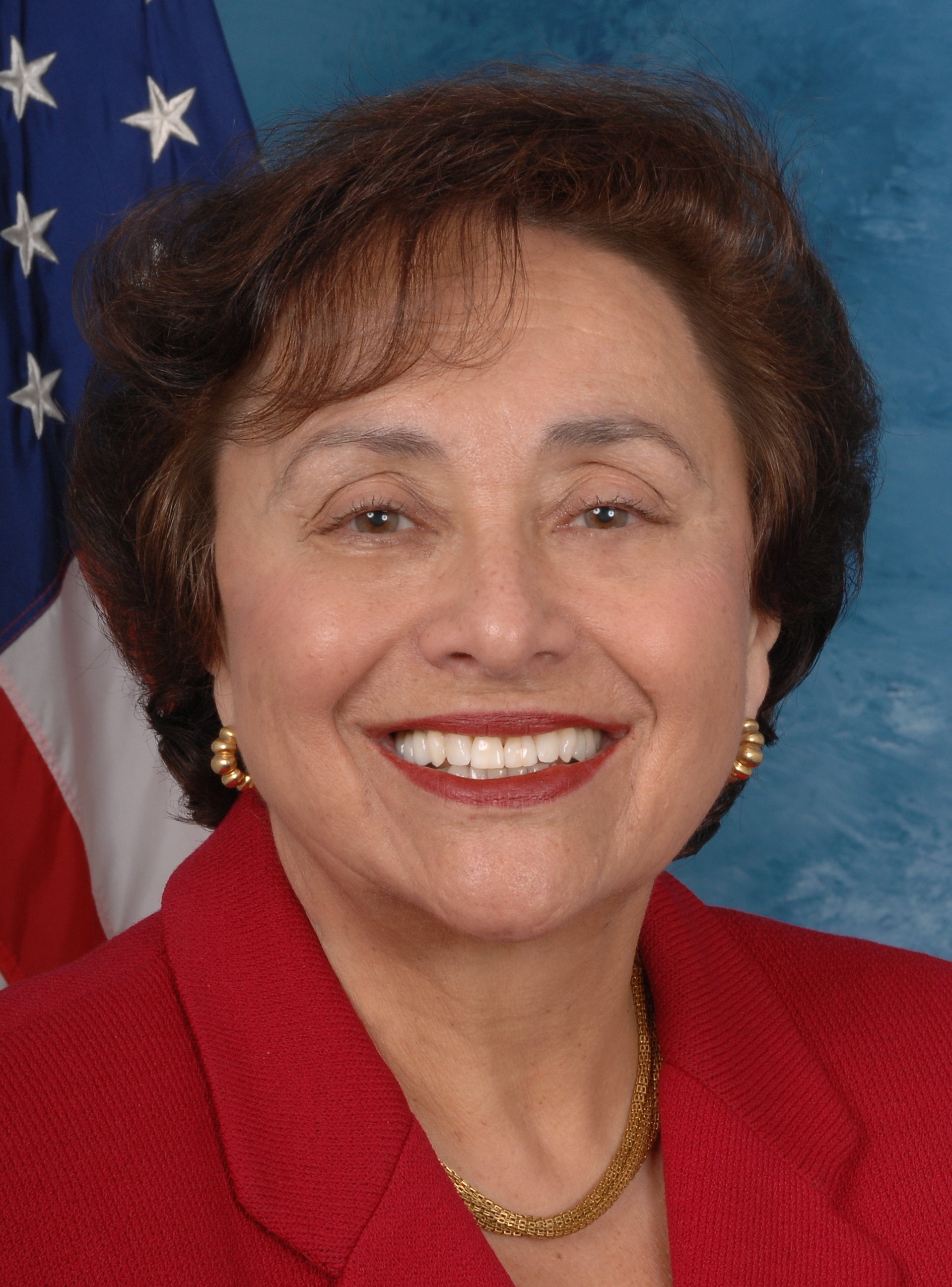

Nominee	Nita Lowey	James Russell
Party	Democratic	Republican
Popular vote	114,810	70,015
Percentage	58.2%	35.5%
U.S. Representative before election
Nita Lowey
Democratic
Elected U.S. Representative
Nita Lowey
Democratic

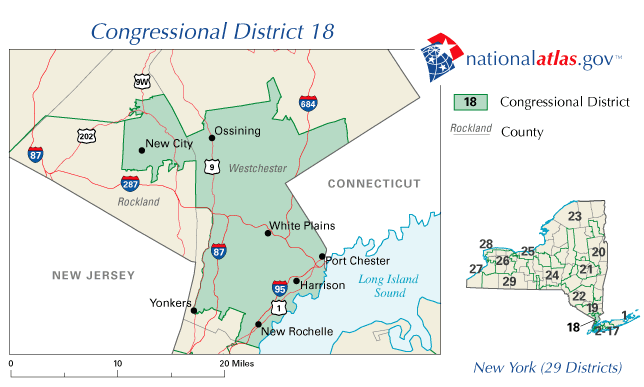

Democratic, Working Families and Independence incumbent Nita Lowey was challenged unsuccessfully by Republican and Conservative Party nominee (and former Republican nominee) Jim Russell and write-in candidate Cortes DeRussy.

Lowey was first elected in 1988 (defeating Joseph J. DioGuardi) and had had few challenges since. Venture capitalist Paul Wasserman, who would have run against her as a Republican, backed out in July 2010. Mark Rosen, seen by many as the strongest competitor, was recalled to military service just as his campaign was gaining traction. Theologian James C. Russell held the Republican and Conservative ballot lines, but the Republican Party disowned him after an essay in which he supported racial segregation surfaced; they had no way of removing him from the ballot. The Republicans then endorsed write-in candidate Cortes DeRussy. Lowey won the general election on November 2, 2010.

- Race ranking and details from CQ Politics
- Campaign contributions from OpenSecrets
- Race profile at The New York Times

=== Predictions ===
Source	Ranking	As of
The Cook Political Report	Safe D	November 1, 2010
Rothenberg	Safe D	November 1, 2010
Sabato's Crystal Ball	Safe D	November 1, 2010
RCP	Safe D	November 1, 2010
CQ Politics	Safe D	October 28, 2010
The New York Times	Safe D	November 1, 2010
FiveThirtyEight	Safe D	November 1, 2010

New York's 18th congressional district election, 2010
Party	Candidate	Votes	%
Democratic	Nita Lowey	104,095	52.78
Independence	Nita Lowey	5,667	2.87
Working Families	Nita Lowey	5,048	2.56
Totals	Nita Lowey (incumbent)	114,810	58.22
Republican	James Russell	60,154	30.50
Conservative	James Russell	9,861	5.00
Total	James Russell	70,015	35.50
None	Blank/void/write-in	12,387	6.28
Total votes		197,212	100

== District 19 ==
2010 New York's 19th congressional district election
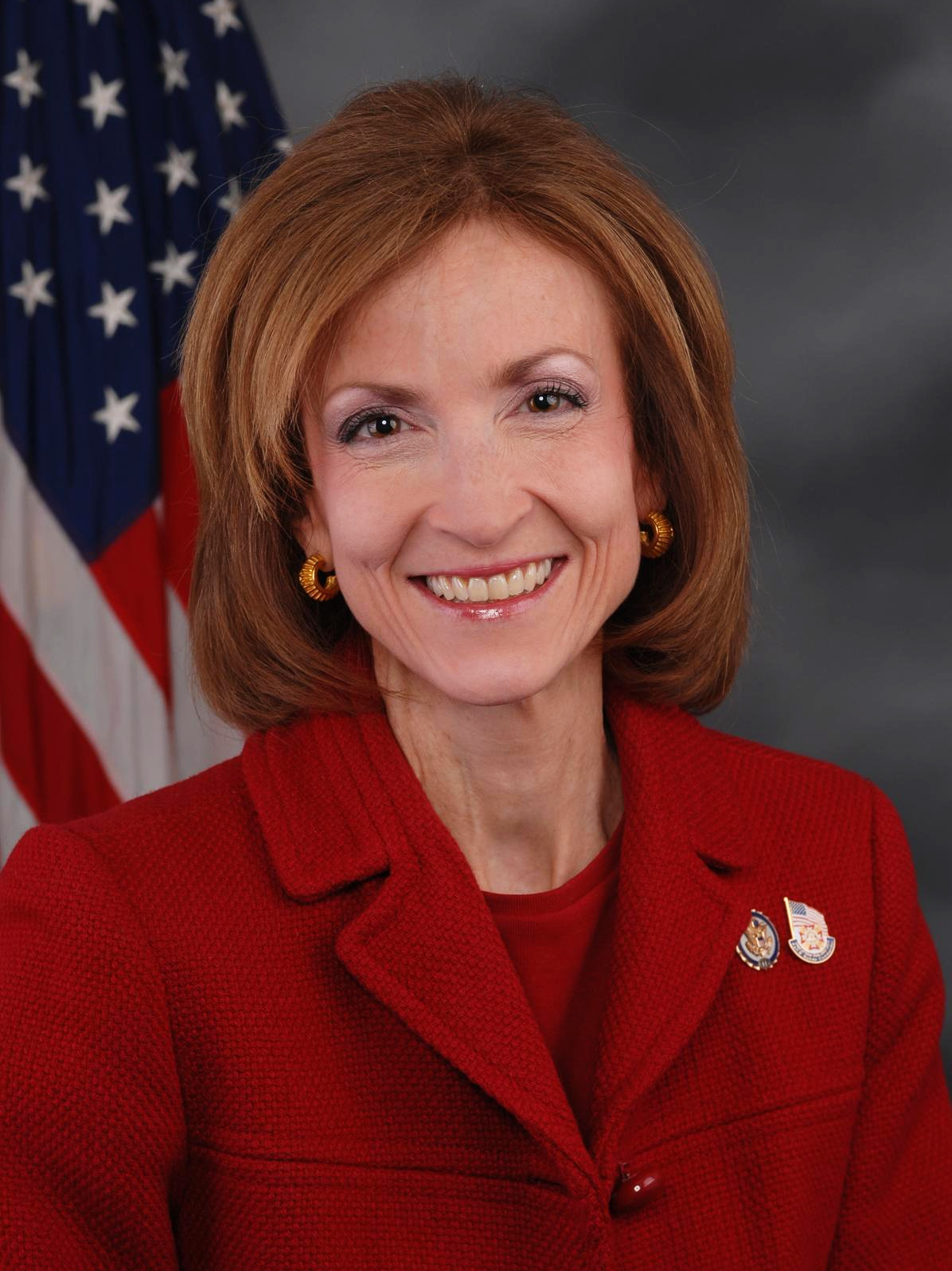

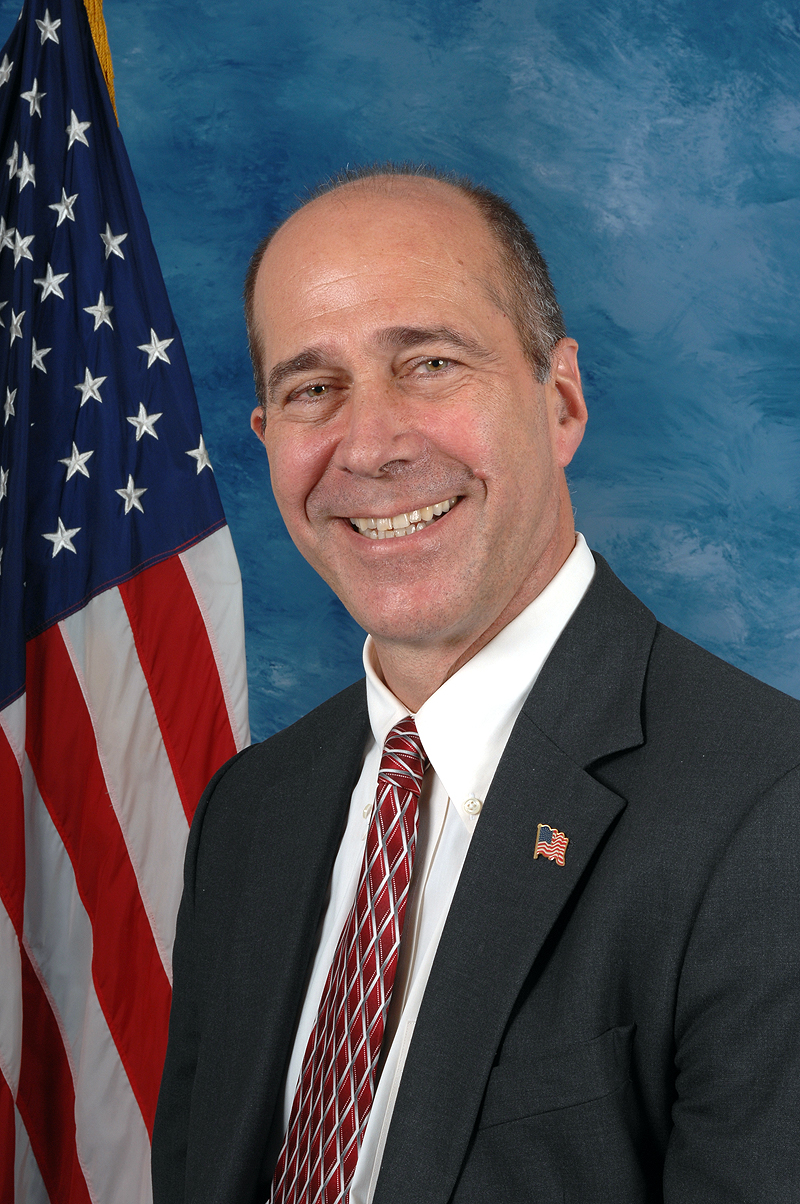
Nominee	Nan Hayworth	John Hall
Party	Republican	Democratic
Popular vote	109,944	98,788
Percentage	50.4%	45.3%
U.S. Representative before election
John Hall
Democratic
Elected U.S. Representative
Nan Hayworth
Republican

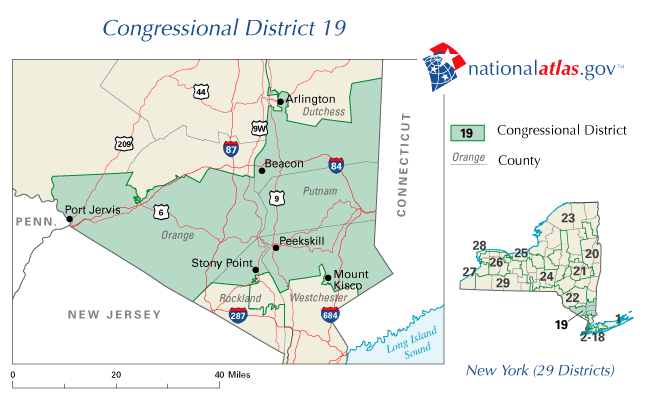

Democratic and Working Families incumbent John Hall ran for reelection, challenged by Republican, Conservative and Independence nominee Nan Hayworth. Hayworth prevailed by five points.

- NY - District 19 from OurCampaigns.com
- Race ranking and details from CQ Politics
- Campaign contributions from OpenSecrets
- Race profile at The New York Times

=== Polling ===
Poll source	Dates administered	John Hall (D)	Nan Hayworth (R)	Undecided
Siena	October 23–26, 2010	47%	46%	6%
Iona College	October 20, 2010	43%	44%	13%
Monmouth University	October 15–18, 2010	49%	48%	3%
The Hill/ANGA	October 12–14, 2010	43%	43%	12%
Siena	October 5–10, 2010	43%	46%	10%
Iona College	October 6, 2010	42%	42%	16%
Public Policy Polling	September 11–12, 2010	42%	44%	14%

==== Predictions ====
Source	Ranking	As of
The Cook Political Report	Tossup	November 1, 2010
Rothenberg	Tilt R (flip)	November 1, 2010
Sabato's Crystal Ball	Lean R (flip)	November 1, 2010
RCP	Tossup	November 1, 2010
CQ Politics	Tossup	October 28, 2010
The New York Times	Tossup	November 1, 2010
FiveThirtyEight	Lean R (flip)	November 1, 2010

=== Results ===
New York's 19th congressional district election, 2010
Party	Candidate	Votes	%
Democratic	John Hall	91,822	42.11
Working Families	John Hall	6,966	3.19
Totals	John Hall (incumbent)	98,788	45.30
Republican	Nan Hayworth	88,766	40.71
Conservative	Nan Hayworth	15,728	7.21
Independence	Nan Hayworth	5,450	2.50
Total	Nan Hayworth	109,944	50.42
None	Blank/void/write-in	9,319	4.27
Total votes		218,051	100

== District 20 ==
2010 New York's 20th congressional district election
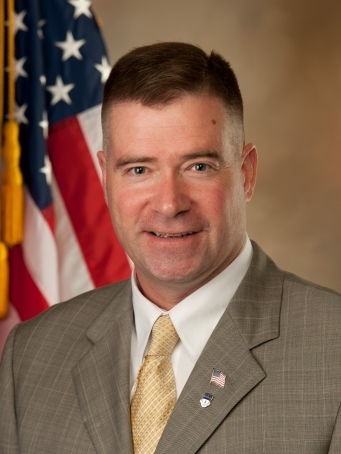

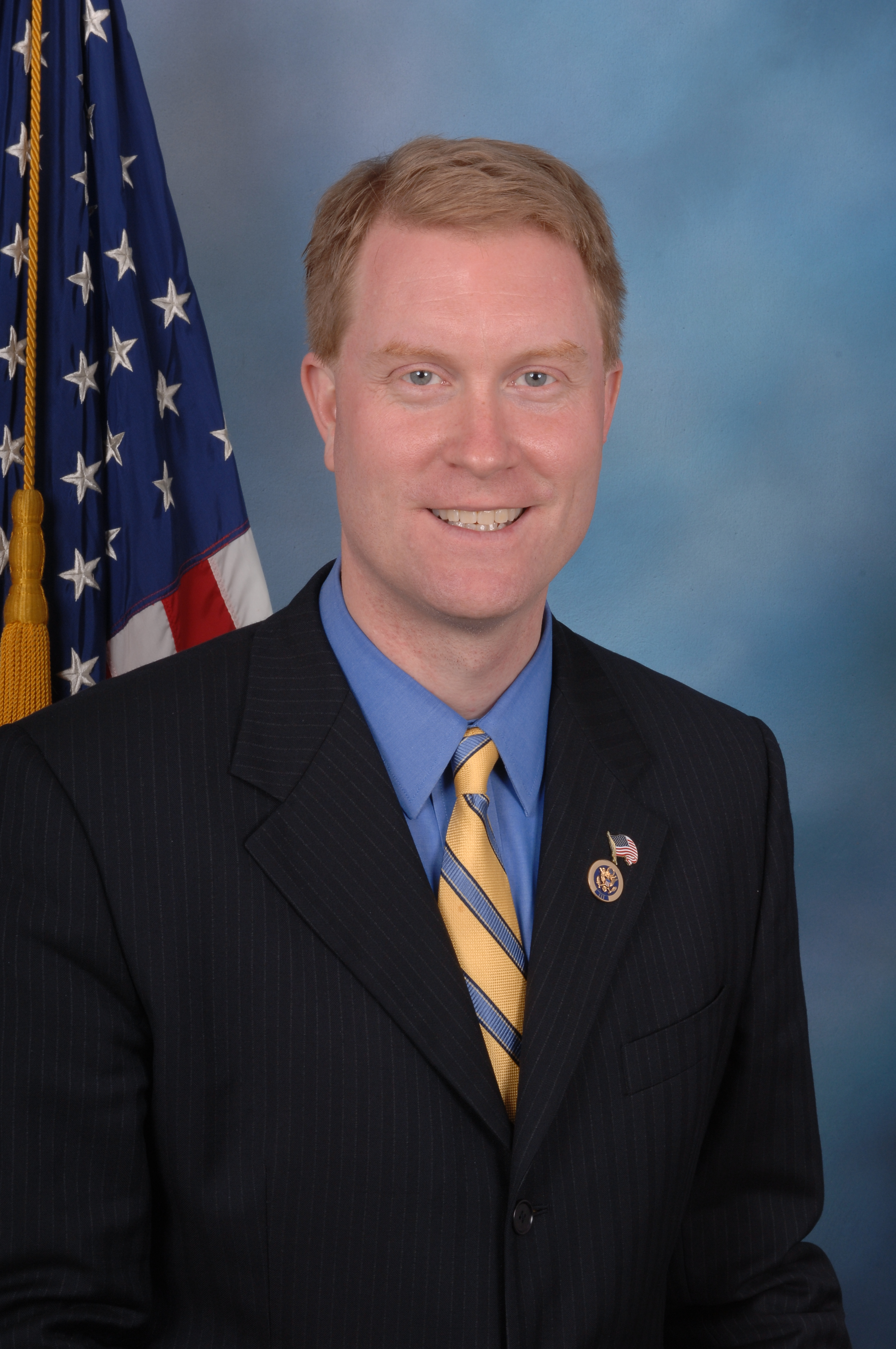
Nominee	Chris Gibson	Scott Murphy
Party	Republican	Democratic
Popular vote	130,176	107,077
Percentage	53.2%	43.8%
U.S. Representative before election
Scott Murphy
Democratic
Elected U.S. Representative
Chris Gibson
Republican

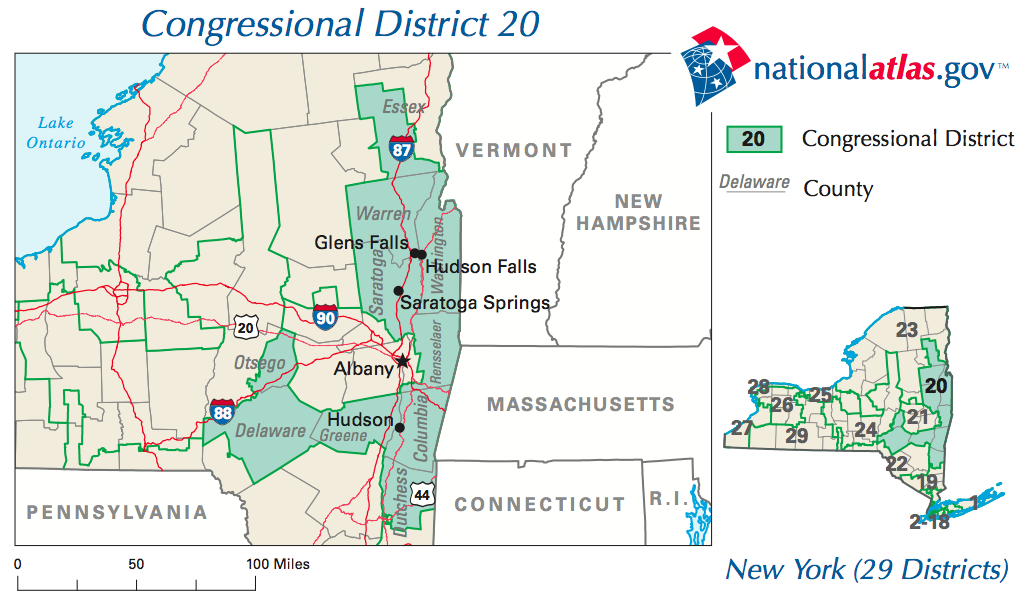

Democratic, Working Families and Independence Party incumbent Scott Murphy was challenged by Republican and Conservative Party nominee Chris Gibson, a retired U.S. Army colonel.

Murphy had won a 2009 special election for the seat which was called after Kirsten Gillibrand was appointed to the United States Senate in January.

Gibson unseated Murphy on November 2, 2010.

- Race ranking and details from CQ Politics
- Campaign contributions from OpenSecrets
- Race profile at The New York Times

=== Polling ===
Poll source	Dates administered	Scott Murphy (D)	Chris Gibson (R)	Undecided
Siena	October 23–25, 2010	42%	51%	-
Public Opinion Strategies	October 17–18, 2010	42%	44%	-
NRCC internal poll	Early-October, 2010	45%	48%	-
Grove Insight	September 28–30, 2010	51%	38%	-
Public Opinion Strategies	September 27–28, 2010	42%	38%	-
Siena	September 12–14, 2010	54%	37%	-
American Action Forum	July 28-Aug. 1, 2010	45%	40%	15%

==== Predictions ====
Source	Ranking	As of
The Cook Political Report	Tossup	November 1, 2010
Rothenberg	Tilt R (flip)	November 1, 2010
Sabato's Crystal Ball	Lean R (flip)	November 1, 2010
RCP	Lean R (flip)	November 1, 2010
CQ Politics	Tossup	October 28, 2010
The New York Times	Tossup	November 1, 2010
FiveThirtyEight	Likely R (flip)	November 1, 2010

=== Results ===
New York's 20th congressional district election, 2010
Party	Candidate	Votes	%
Democratic	Scott Murphy	91,577	37.42
Working Families	Scott Murphy	6,642	2.71
Independence	Scott Murphy	8,858	3.62
Totals	Scott Murphy (incumbent)	107,077	43.75
Republican	Chris Gibson	110,813	45.28
Conservative	Chris Gibson	19,363	7.91
Total	Chris Gibson	130,176	53.19
None	Blank/void/write-in	7,501	3.06
Total votes		244,754	100

== District 21 ==
2010 New York's 21st congressional district election
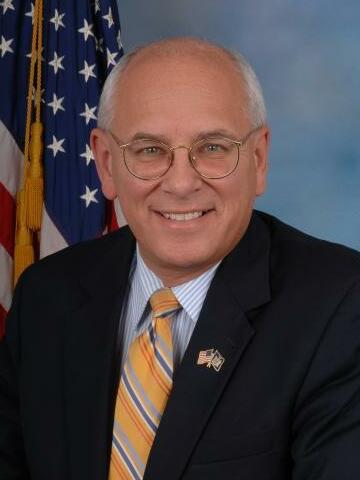

Nominee	Paul Tonko	Ted Danz
Party	Democratic	Republican
Popular vote	124,889	85,752
Percentage	56.9%	39.1%
- County results Tonko: 50–60% 60–70% Danz: 50–60%
U.S. Representative before election
Paul Tonko
Democratic
Elected U.S. Representative
Paul Tonko
Democratic

Democratic, Working Families and Independence Party incumbent Paul Tonko ran for reelection, challenged by Republican Conservative Party nominee Ted Danz. The district lies in the Capital District of New York, including Albany, Schenectady, and Troy. Tonko won the general election on November 2, 2010.

- Race ranking and details from CQ Politics
- Campaign contributions from OpenSecrets
- Race profile at The New York Times

=== Predictions ===
Source	Ranking	As of
The Cook Political Report	Safe D	November 1, 2010
Rothenberg	Safe D	November 1, 2010
Sabato's Crystal Ball	Safe D	November 1, 2010
RCP	Safe D	November 1, 2010
CQ Politics	Safe D	October 28, 2010
The New York Times	Safe D	November 1, 2010
FiveThirtyEight	Safe D	November 1, 2010

New York's 21st congressional district election, 2010
Party	Candidate	Votes	%
Democratic	Paul Tonko	107,136	48.83
Working Families	Paul Tonko	8,128	3.70
Independence	Paul Tonko	9,625	4.39
Totals	Paul Tonko (incumbent)	124,889	56.92
Republican	Ted Danz	70,211	32.00
Conservative	Ted Danz	15,541	7.08
Total	Ted Danz	85,752	39.08
None	Blank/void/write-in	8,784	4.00
Total votes		219,425	100

== District 22 ==
2010 New York's 22nd congressional district election
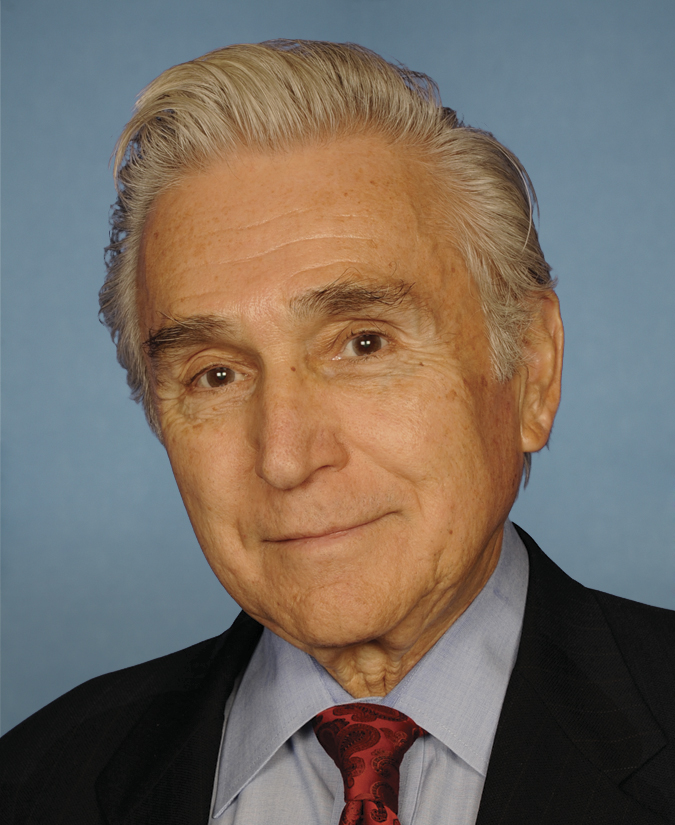

Nominee	Maurice Hinchey	George K. Phillips
Party	Democratic	Republican
Popular vote	98,661	88,687
Percentage	51.0%	45.9%
U.S. Representative before election
Maurice Hinchey
Democratic
Elected U.S. Representative
Maurice Hinchey
Democratic

Democratic incumbent Maurice Hinchey and Working Families and Independence Party candidate ran successfully for reelection, defeating Republican and Conservative Party challenger George Phillips.

- Race ranking and details from CQ Politics
- Campaign contributions from OpenSecrets
- Race profile at The New York Times

=== Polling ===
Poll source	Dates administered	Maurice Hinchey (D)	George Phillips (R)	Undecided
Abacus Associates	October 20–21, 2010	51%	34%	-
Magellan	October 19, 2010	43%	43%	-

==== Predictions ====
Source	Ranking	As of
The Cook Political Report	Lean D	November 1, 2010
Rothenberg	Safe D	November 1, 2010
Sabato's Crystal Ball	Likely D	November 1, 2010
RCP	Lean D	November 1, 2010
CQ Politics	Likely D	October 28, 2010
The New York Times	Lean D	November 1, 2010
FiveThirtyEight	Likely D	November 1, 2010

=== Results ===
New York's 22nd congressional district election, 2010
Party	Candidate	Votes	%
Democratic	Maurice D. Hinchey	83,849	43.36
Working Families	Maurice Hinchey	8,886	4.60
Independence	Maurice Hinchey	5,926	3.06
Totals	Maurice Hinchey (incumbent)	98,661	51.03
Republican	George K. Phillips	75,558	39.08
Conservative	George K. Phillips	13,129	6.79
Total	George K. Phillips	88,687	45.87
None	Blank/void/write-in	6,010	3.11
Total votes		193,358	100

== District 23 ==
2010 New York's 23rd congressional district election
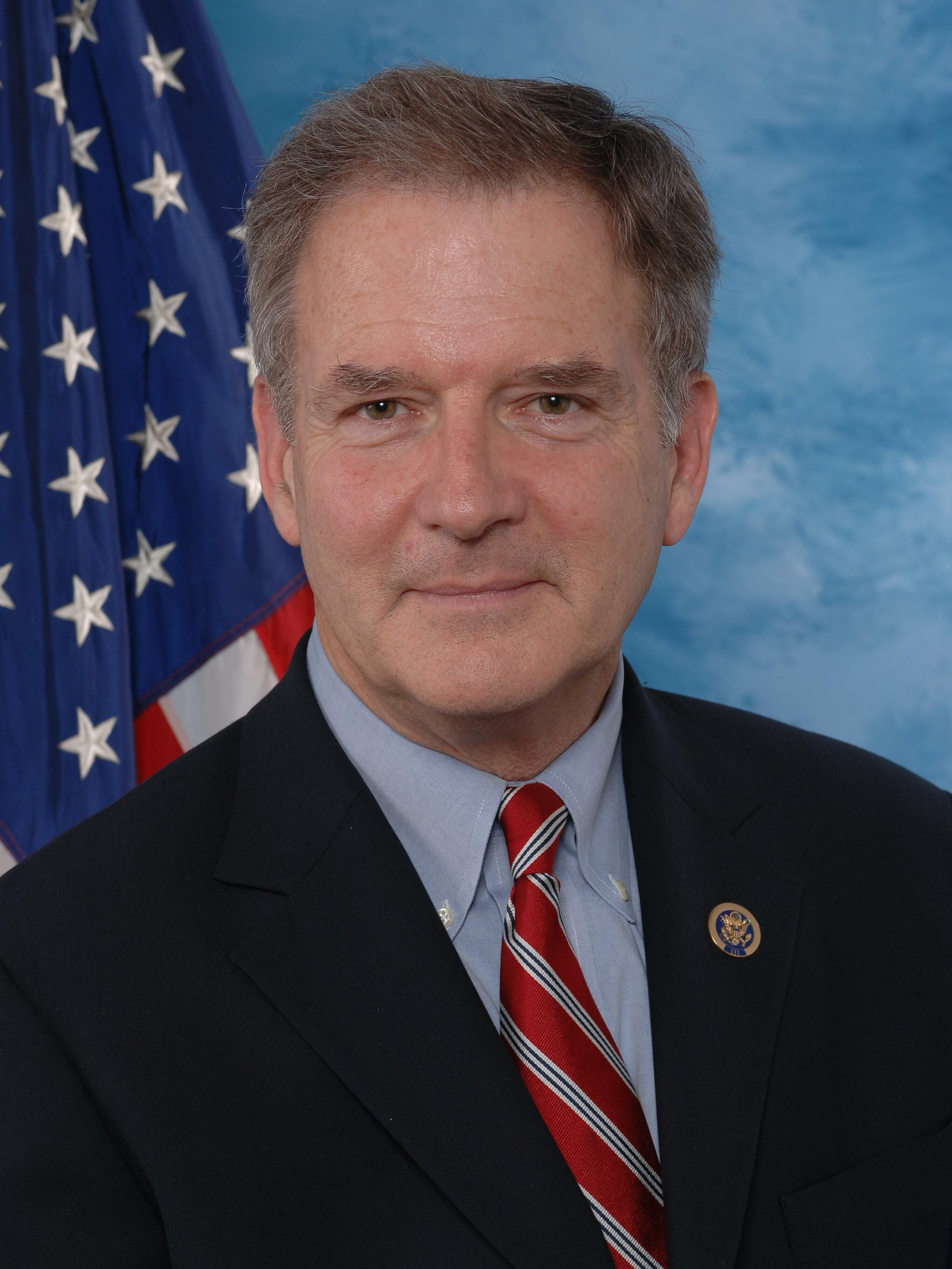

Nominee	Bill Owens	Matt Doheny	Doug Hoffman
Party	Democratic	Republican	Conservative
Popular vote	82,232	80,237	10,507
Percentage	47.5%	46.4%	6.1%
- County results Doheny: 40–50% 50–60% 60–70% Owens: 40–50% 50–60%
U.S. Representative before election
Bill Owens
Democratic
Elected U.S. Representative
Bill Owens
Democratic

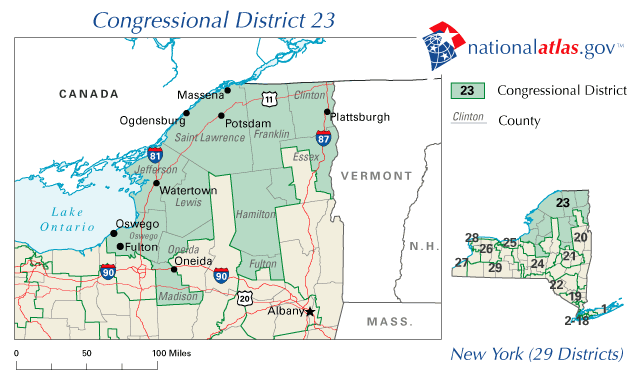

Democratic and Working Families incumbent Bill Owens ran for reelection, challenged by Republican and Independence nominee Matt Doheny. Conservative Party nominee Doug Hoffman, who lost to Doheny in a Republican primary, was also on the ballot, but he suspended his campaign on October 5, 2010.

Owens had won this seat in a 2009 special election by 3,584 votes or 48% to 46% over Conservative Party of New York nominee Hoffman after Republican Dierdre Scozzafava suspended her campaign and endorsed Owens less than three days before the election. Prominent Republicans, including former vice presidential candidate Sarah Palin, Minnesota Governor Tim Pawlenty, and former New York Governor George Pataki endorsed Hoffman instead of Scozzafava, who had been picked by Republican county chairs.

On November 2, 2010, Owens was re-elected to a full term over Doheny with a second plurality win, with Hoffman's vote tally exceeding Owens's margin of victory.

- Race ranking and details from CQ Politics
- Campaign contributions from OpenSecrets
- Race profile at The New York Times

=== Polling ===
Poll source	Dates administered	Bill Owens (D)	Matt Doheny (R)	Undecided
Siena	October 23–26, 2010	42%	42%	-
Siena	October 5–7, 2010	44%	39%	-
Public Opinion Strategies	September 22–23, 2010	37%	51%	-
American Action Forum	July 28-Aug. 1, 2010	41%	39%	20%

==== Predictions ====
Source	Ranking	As of
The Cook Political Report	Tossup	November 1, 2010
Rothenberg	Tossup	November 1, 2010
Sabato's Crystal Ball	Lean R (flip)	November 1, 2010
RCP	Lean R (flip)	November 1, 2010
CQ Politics	Tossup	October 28, 2010
The New York Times	Tossup	November 1, 2010
FiveThirtyEight	Lean R (flip)	November 1, 2010

=== Results ===
New York's 23rd congressional district election, 2010
Party	Candidate	Votes	%
Democratic	Bill Owens	75,849	41.6
Working Families	Bill Owens	6,383	5.1
Totals	Bill Owens (incumbent)	82,232	47.5
Republican	Matt Doheny	73,646	40.4
Independence	Matt Doheny	6,591	6.0
Total	Matt Doheny	80,237	46.4
Conservative	Doug Hoffman	10,507	6.1
None	Blank/void/write-in	115	0.1
Total votes		182,510	100

== District 24 ==
2010 New York's 24th congressional district election
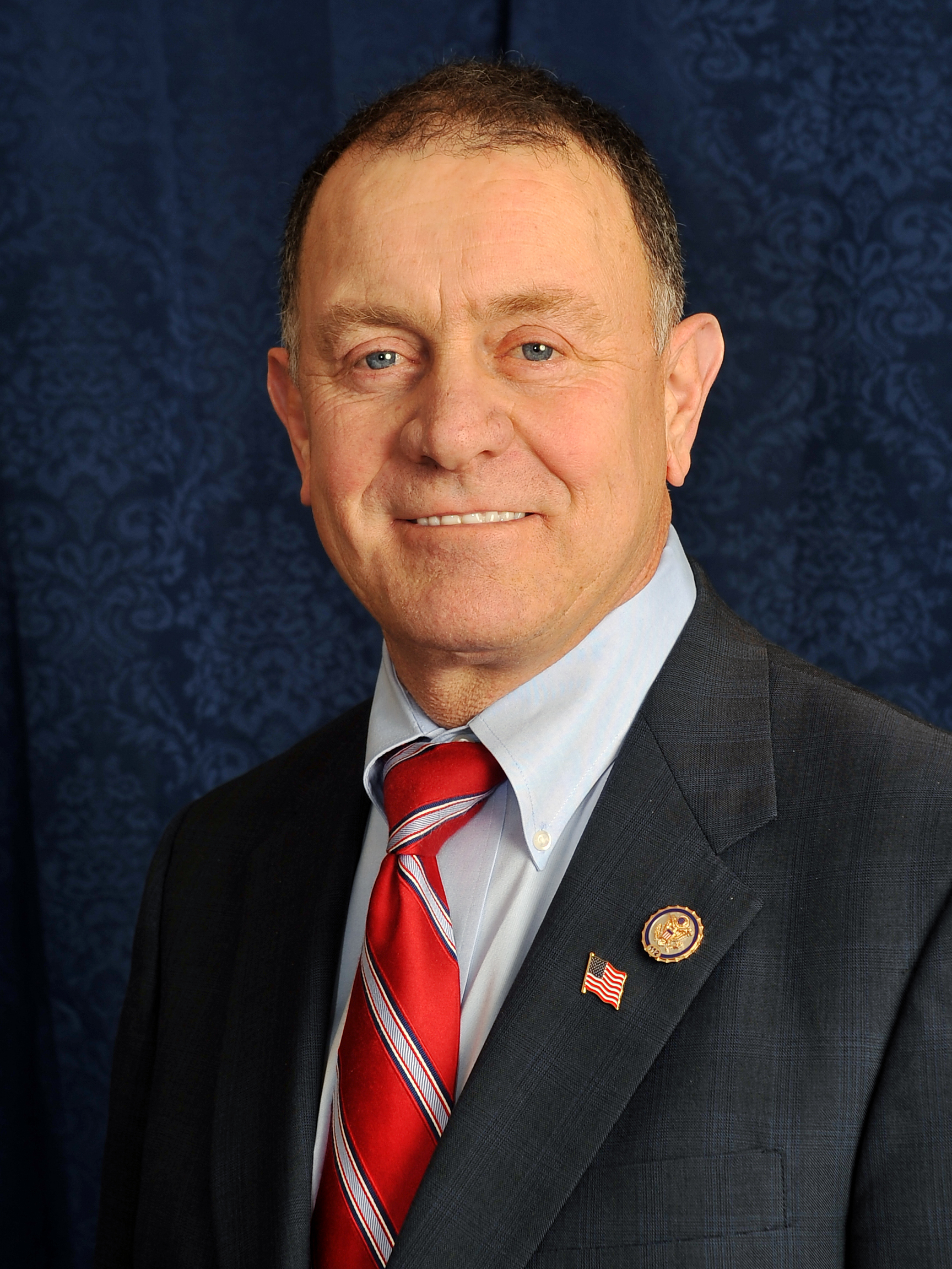

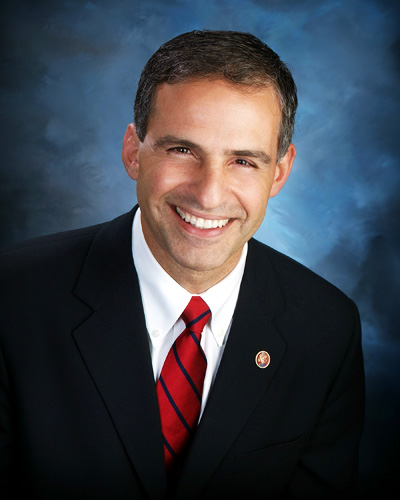
Nominee	Richard L. Hanna	Michael Arcuri
Party	Republican	Democratic
Popular vote	101,599	89,809
Percentage	51.2%	45.3%
U.S. Representative before election
Michael Arcuri
Democratic
Elected U.S. Representative
Richard L. Hanna
Republican

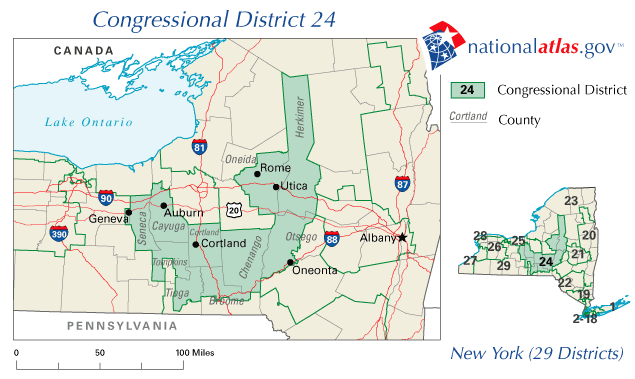

Democratic incumbent Michael Arcuri lost in 2010 to Republican, Conservative and Independence Party nominee Richard L. Hanna, whom Arcuri had narrowly defeated in 2008.

The Libertarian Party of New York backed 25-year-old Ernest Logan Bell and headed a petition drive to get him onto the ballot.

- NY - District 24 from OurCampaigns.com
- Race ranking and details from CQ Politics
- Campaign contributions from OpenSecrets
- Race profile at The New York Times

Hanna won the general election, unseating Arcuri on November 2, 2010.

=== Polling ===
Poll source	Dates administered	Mike Arcuri (D)	Richard L. Hanna (R)	Undecided
Siena	October 23–25, 2010	48%	43%	10%
The Hill/ANGA	October 12–14, 2010	47%	37%	13%
McLaughlin & Associates	October 6–7, 2010	43%	46%	-
Siena	September 13–15, 2010	48%	40%	12%
Benenson Strategy Group†	August 29–31, 2010	50%	37%	-

†Internal poll for Arcuri campaign

==== Predictions ====
Source	Ranking	As of
The Cook Political Report	Tossup	November 1, 2010
Rothenberg	Tossup	November 1, 2010
Sabato's Crystal Ball	Lean D	November 1, 2010
RCP	Tossup	November 1, 2010
CQ Politics	Tossup	October 28, 2010
The New York Times	Tossup	November 1, 2010
FiveThirtyEight	Lean D	November 1, 2010

=== Results ===
New York's 24th congressional district election, 2010
Party	Candidate	Votes	%
Democratic	Michael Arcuri	85,624	43.15
Working Families	Michael Arcuri	6,383	3.50
Totals	Michael Arcuri (incumbent)	89,809	45.25
Republican	Richard L. Hanna	85,702	43.19
Conservative	Richard L. Hanna	10,313	5.20
Independence	Richard L. Hanna	5,584	2.81
Total	Richard L. Hanna	101,599	51.20
None	Blank/void/write-in	7,045	3.55
Total votes		198,453	100

== District 25 ==
2010 New York's 25th congressional district election
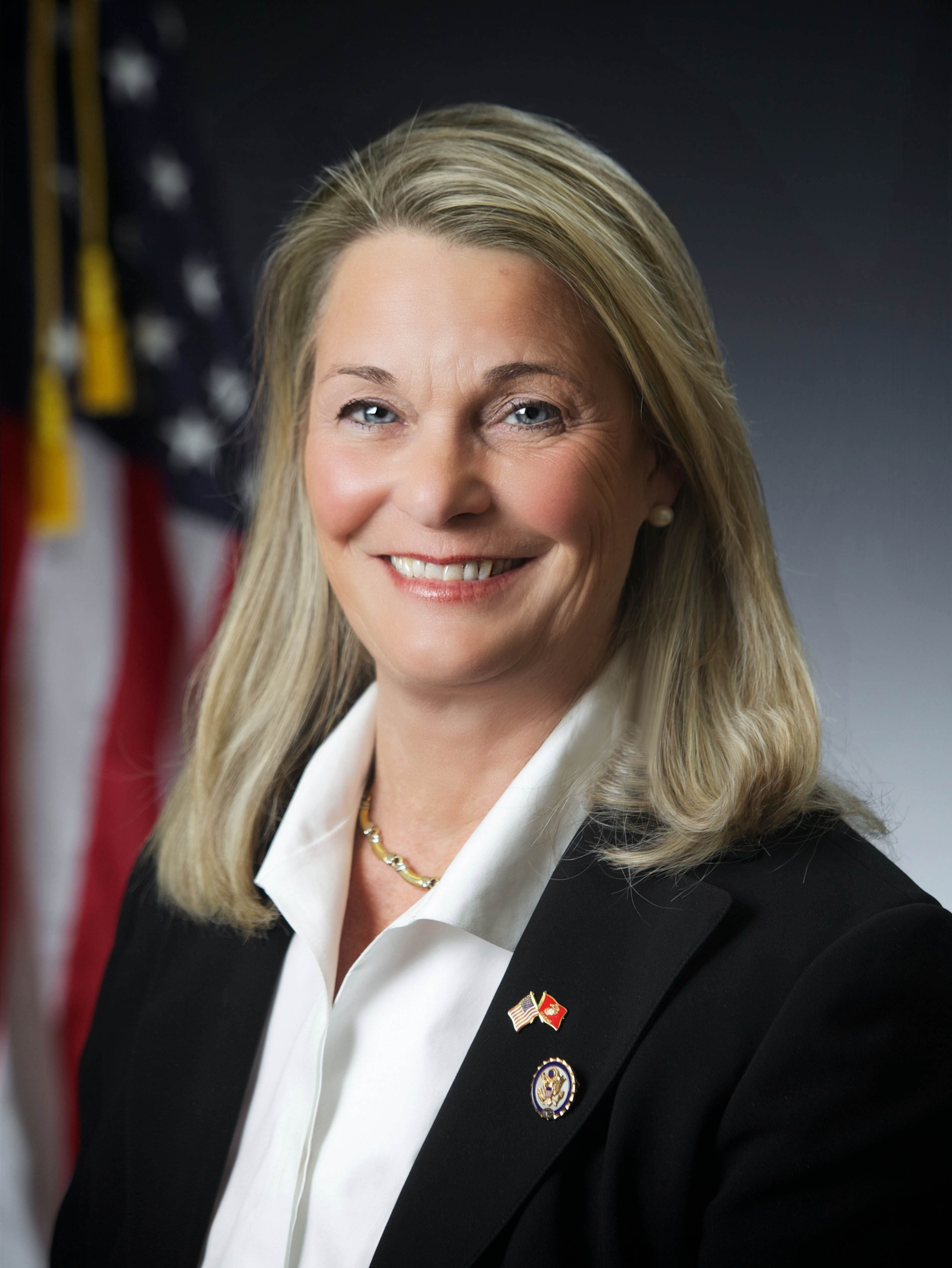

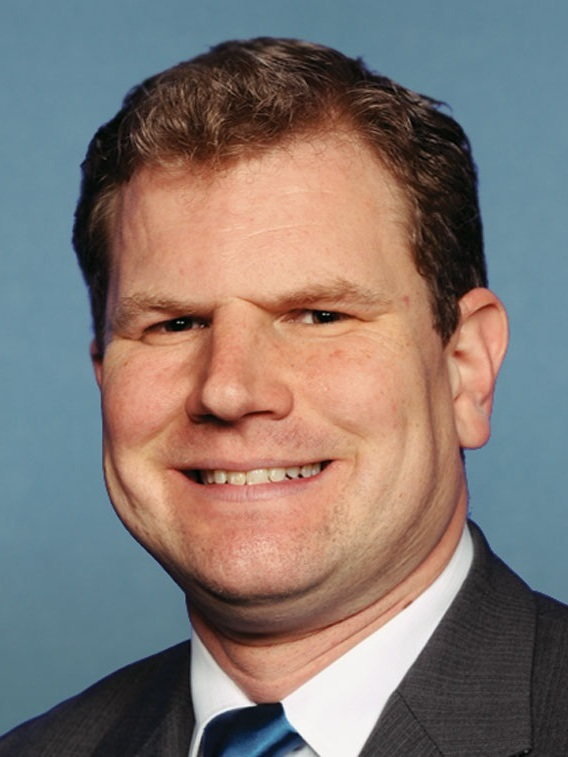
Nominee	Ann Marie Buerkle	Dan Maffei
Party	Republican	Democratic
Popular vote	104,602	103,954
Percentage	48.5%	48.2%
U.S. Representative before election
Dan Maffei
Democratic
Elected U.S. Representative
Ann Marie Buerkle
Republican

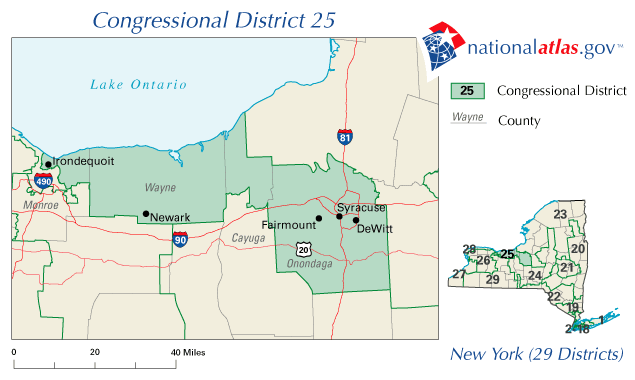

Democratic and Working Families incumbent Dan Maffei ran for reelection, challenged by Republican, Conservative and Independence Party nominee Ann Marie Buerkle.

In the Republican primary, Buerkle defeated farmer and government reform advocate Mark Bitz and local leader Paul Bertan. Former congressional candidate David Gay had dropped out of the race earlier and endorsed Buerkle.

In February, 2009, Greenberg Quinlan Rosner and Public Opinion Strategies National Public Radio classified the NY-25th as one of 60 "Most Competitive" Democratically held districts. Maffei was targeted by the NRCC for his vote in favor of the Recovery and Reinvestment Act and the Patient Protection and Affordable Care Act. Cook listed the race as "Likely Democratic" and CQ as "Democrat Favored".

Though Maffei was favored, Buerkle defeated him on Election Day.

- Race ranking and details from CQ Politics
- Campaign contributions from OpenSecrets
- Race profile at The New York Times

=== Polling ===
Poll source	Dates administered	Dan Maffei (D)	Ann Marie Buerkle (R)	Undecided
Siena	October 10–12, 2010	51%	39%	10%
McLaughlin & Associates	October 4–5, 2010	39%	40%	-
American Action Forum	July 28-Aug. 1, 2010	44%	41%	15%
McLaughlin & Associates	July 26–27, 2010	46%	37%	-
Kiley & Co.	June 27–30, 2010	54%	35%	-

==== Predictions ====
Source	Ranking	As of
The Cook Political Report	Lean D	November 1, 2010
Rothenberg	Likely D	November 1, 2010
Sabato's Crystal Ball	Likely D	November 1, 2010
RCP	Lean D	November 1, 2010
CQ Politics	Likely D	October 28, 2010
The New York Times	Lean D	November 1, 2010
FiveThirtyEight	Likely D	November 1, 2010

=== Results ===
New York's 25th congressional district election, 2010
Party	Candidate	Votes	%
Democratic	Dan Maffei	95,146	44.13
Working Families	Dan Maffei	8,808	4.09
Totals	Dan Maffei (incumbent)	103,954	48.21
Republican	Ann Marie Buerkle	81,380	37.74
Conservative	Ann Marie Buerkle	16,830	7.81
Independence	Ann Marie Buerkle	6,392	2.96
Total	Ann Marie Buerkle	104,602	48.51
None	Blank/void/write-in	7,057	3.27
Total votes		215,613	100

== District 26 ==
2010 New York's 26th congressional district election
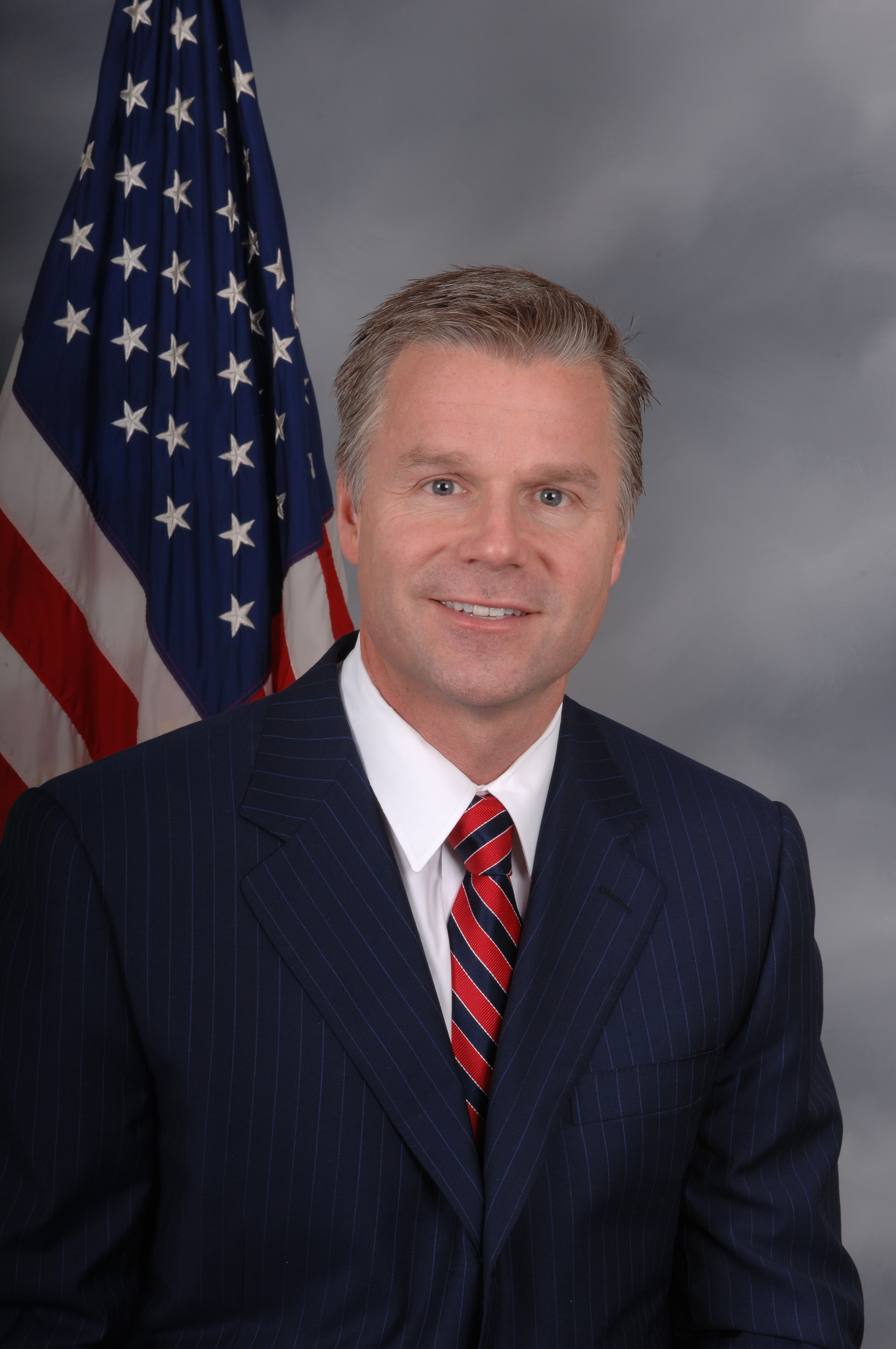

Nominee	Chris Lee	Philip A. Fedele
Party	Republican	Democratic
Popular vote	151,449	54,307
Percentage	68.3%	24.5%
U.S. Representative before election
Chris Lee
Republican
Elected U.S. Representative
Chris Lee
Republican

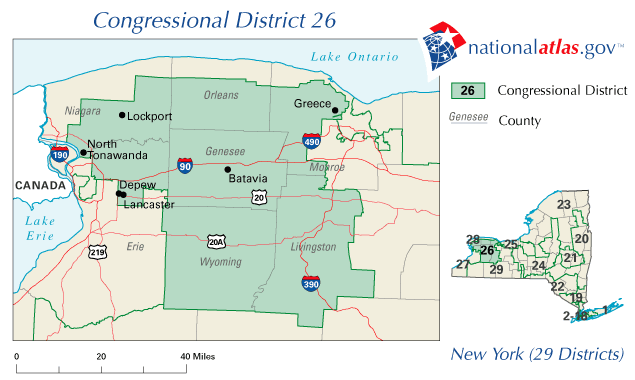

Republican, Conservative and Independence Party incumbent Chris Lee ran for reelection, challenged by Democratic nominee Philip A. Fedele. Lee won the general election on November 2, 2010, only to resign three months later after it became known that he had sent a suggestive photo to a woman other than his wife.

- Race ranking and details from CQ Politics
- Campaign contributions from OpenSecrets
- Race profile at The New York Times

=== Predictions ===
Source	Ranking	As of
The Cook Political Report	Safe R	November 1, 2010
Rothenberg	Safe R	November 1, 2010
Sabato's Crystal Ball	Safe R	November 1, 2010
RCP	Safe R	November 1, 2010
CQ Politics	Safe R	October 28, 2010
The New York Times	Safe R	November 1, 2010
FiveThirtyEight	Safe R	November 1, 2010

New York's 26th congressional district election, 2010
Party	Candidate	Votes	%
Democratic	Philip A. Fedele	54,307	24.49
Republican	Chris Lee	121,371	54.73
Conservative	Chris Lee	19,368	8.73
Independence	Chris Lee	10,710	4.83
Total	Chris Lee (incumbent)	151,449	68.29
None	Blank/void/write-in	16,007	7.22
Total votes		221,763	100

== District 27 ==
2010 New York's 27th congressional district election
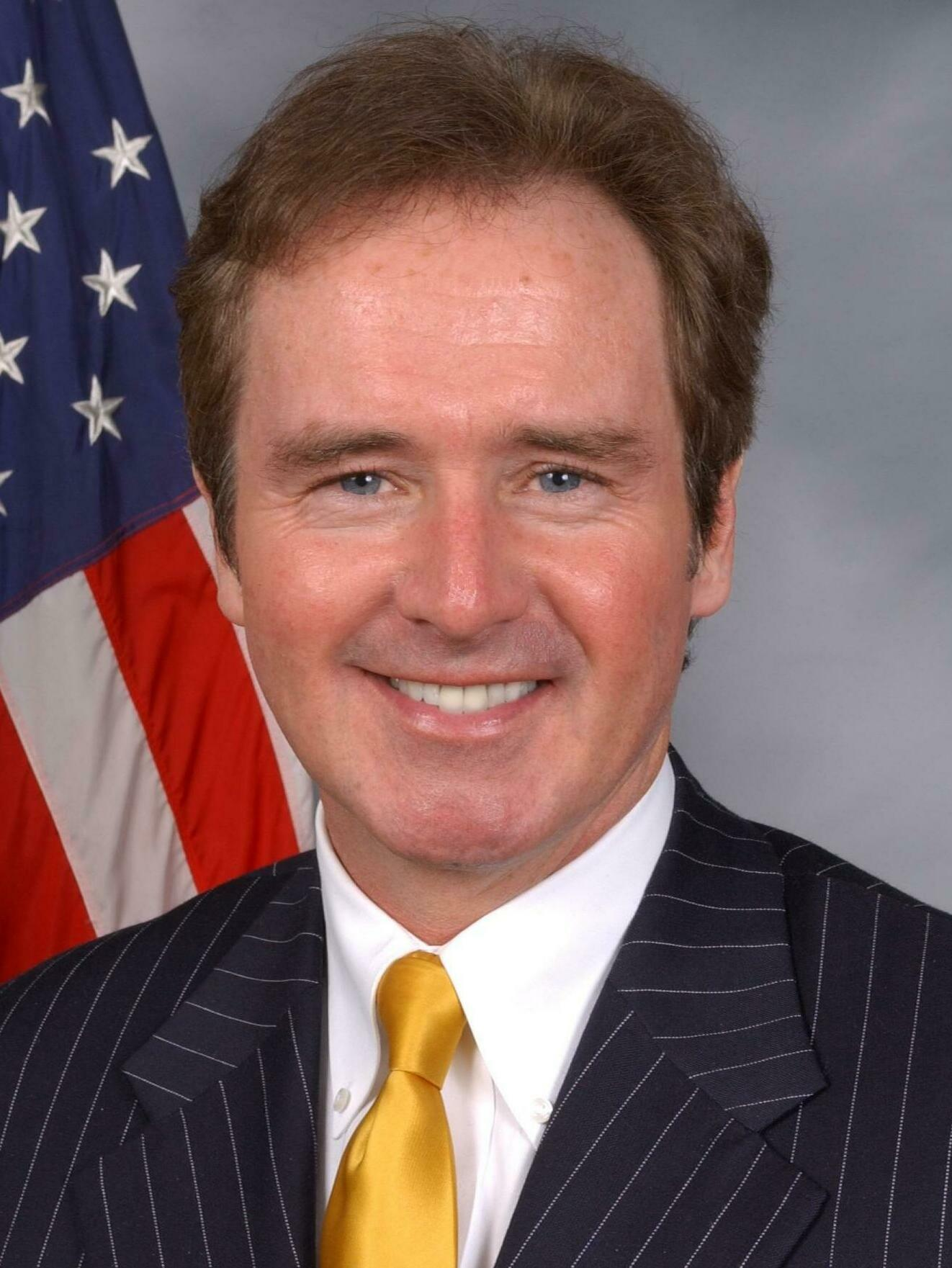

Nominee	Brian Higgins	Leonard Roberto
Party	Democratic	Republican
Popular vote	119,085	76,320
Percentage	57.8%	37.1%
U.S. Representative before election
Brian Higgins
Democratic
Elected U.S. Representative
Brian Higgins
Democratic

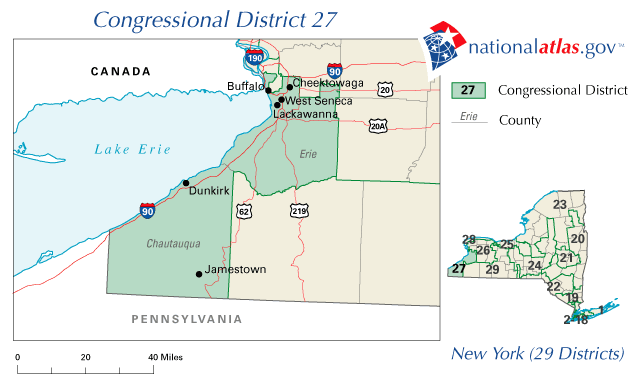

Democratic and Working Families incumbent Brian Higgins ran for reelection, challenged by Republican, Conservative and Taxpayers Party nominee Leonard Roberto, an Akron native and a leader in the local branch of the Tea Party movement. Roberto declared his candidacy against Higgins on April 13, 2010. The district included Chautauqua County and a large portion of Erie County, including a portion of the city of Buffalo.

Higgins won reelection on November 2, 2010.

- Race ranking and details from CQ Politics
- Campaign contributions from OpenSecrets
- Race profile at The New York Times

=== Predictions ===
Source	Ranking	As of
The Cook Political Report	Safe D	November 1, 2010
Rothenberg	Safe D	November 1, 2010
Sabato's Crystal Ball	Safe D	November 1, 2010
RCP	Likely D	November 1, 2010
CQ Politics	Safe D	October 28, 2010
The New York Times	Safe D	November 1, 2010
FiveThirtyEight	Safe D	November 1, 2010

New York's 27th congressional district election, 2010
Party	Candidate	Votes	%
Democratic	Brian Higgins	106,644	51.79
Working Families	Brian Higgins	12,441	6.04
Total	Brian Higgins (incumbent)	119,085	57.84
Republican	Leonard Roberto	63,015	30.61
Conservative	Leonard Roberto	13,305	6.46
Total	Leonard Roberto	76,320	37.07
None	Blank/void/write-in	10,492	5.10
Total votes		205,897	100

== District 28 ==
2010 New York's 28th congressional district election
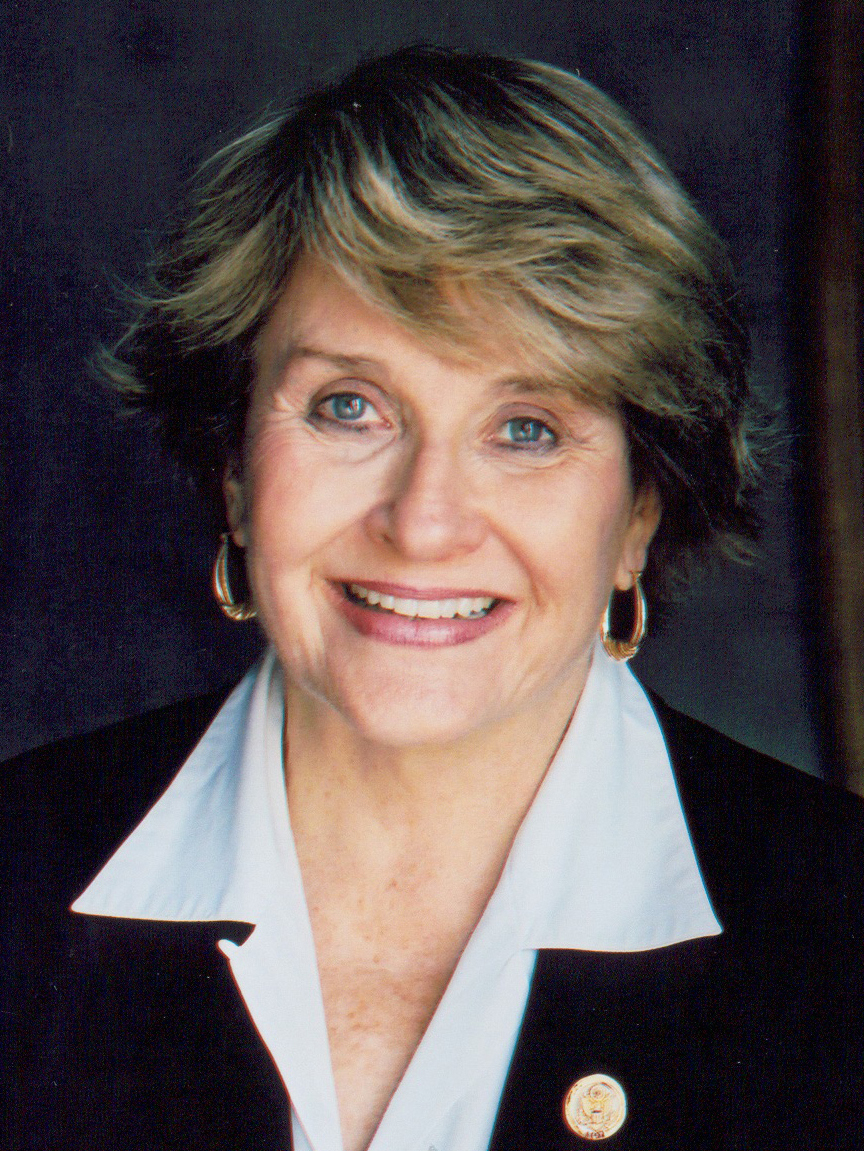

Nominee	Louise Slaughter	Jill Rowland
Party	Democratic	Republican
Popular vote	102,514	55,392
Percentage	61.0%	33.0%
- County results Slaughter: 50–60% 60–70% 70–80% Rowland: 60–70%
U.S. Representative before election
Louise Slaughter
Democratic
Elected U.S. Representative
Louise Slaughter
Democratic

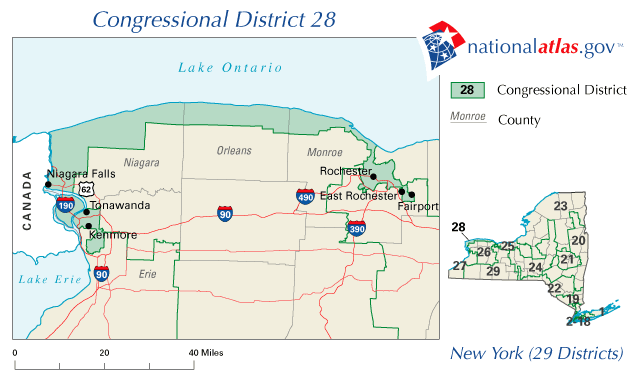

Democratic, Working Families and Independence Party incumbent Louise Slaughter ran for reelection, challenged by Republican and Conservative Party nominee Jill A. Rowland.

Two candidates were put forth by competing factions of the Tea Party movement. Rowland, a dentist, was originally mentioned as a candidate for Higgins's seat, but was persuaded by a faction of the party led by Rus Thompson to run against Slaughter instead. The faction led by James Ostrowski supported Michael Giuliano, a 29-year-old legal publication editor and attorney allied with Ron Paul, but Giuliano dropped out of the race in July 2010.

Slaughter won against Eddie Egriu in the Democratic primary, and she is widely predicted to keep her seat without any serious competition. Fred Smerlas, a former Buffalo Bills defensive tackle who currently resides in Massachusetts, had expressed an interest in returning to Western New York to challenge her, but later stated that he would not do so this election cycle.

Slaughter won the general election on November 2, 2010.

- Race ranking and details from CQ Politics
- Campaign contributions from OpenSecrets
- Race profile at The New York Times

=== Predictions ===
Source	Ranking	As of
The Cook Political Report	Safe D	November 1, 2010
Rothenberg	Safe D	November 1, 2010
Sabato's Crystal Ball	Safe D	November 1, 2010
RCP	Safe D	November 1, 2010
CQ Politics	Safe D	October 28, 2010
The New York Times	Safe D	November 1, 2010
FiveThirtyEight	Safe D	November 1, 2010

New York's 28th congressional district election, 2010
Party	Candidate	Votes	%
Democratic	Louise Slaughter	91,103	54.21
Independence	Louise Slaughter	5,976	3.56
Working Families	Louise Slaughter	5,435	3.23
Total	Louise Slaughter (incumbent)	102,514	61.00
Republican	Jill Rowland	45,630	27.15
Conservative	Jill Rowland	9,762	5.81
Total	Jill Rowland	55,392	32.96
None	Blank/void/write-in	10,149	6.04
Total votes		168,055	100

== District 29 ==
2010 New York's 29th congressional district election
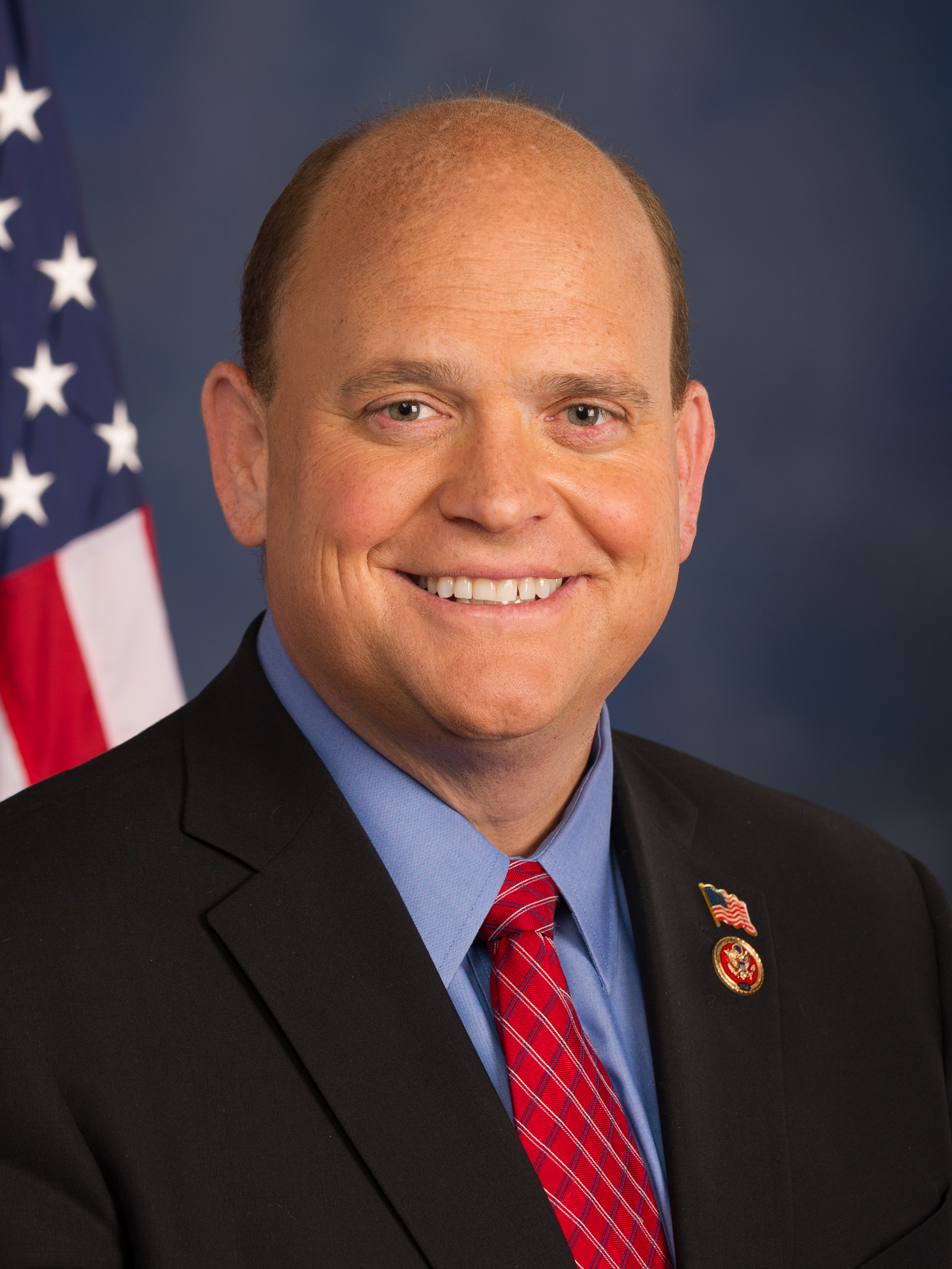

Nominee	Tom Reed	Matthew Zeller
Party	Republican	Democratic
Popular vote	112,314	86,099
Percentage	53.5%	41.0%
- County results Reed: 50–60% 60–70%
U.S. Representative before election
Eric Massa
Democratic
Elected U.S. Representative
Tom Reed
Republican

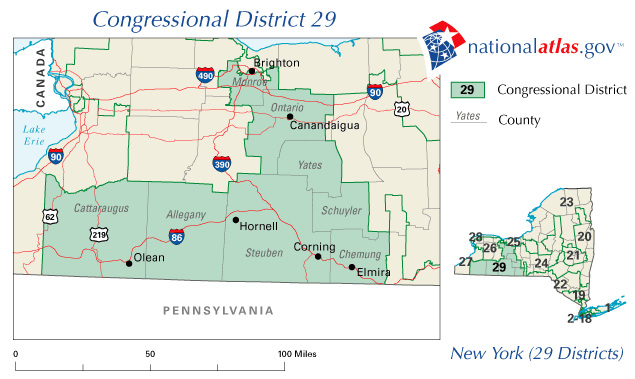

District 29 was an open seat. The candidates on the ballot were Democratic and Working Families nominee Matthew Zeller and Republican, Conservative and Independence Party nominee Tom Reed. "Tea Party" candidate Janice Volk ran as a write-in candidate. Reed defeated Zeller in both the special election to fill the open seat and the general election for the term beginning on January 3, 2011. On March 3, 2010, incumbent Democrat Eric Massa announced that he would retire following reports that he had suffered a recurrence of cancer and allegations of sexual harassment. Massa later announced his resignation effective March 8.

Reed, the outgoing mayor of Corning, announced his candidacy in 2009 and is the Republican nominee. Monroe County executive Maggie Brooks, state senator Catharine Young and Kuhl himself publicly acknowledged they were considering running, but all three backed Reed.

The Democrats selected Zeller as their candidate. Zeller, who was largely unknown until his selection, did not live in the state of New York, but claimed to be a "native" of several towns ranging from Rochester to the Southern Tier.

Shortly after Massa's departure, Rothenberg and CQ shifted the race to a toss-up and Cook moved it into the "Lean Republican" category. National Review, on the other hand, considered the race to be one of the easiest of the competitive races for a Republican takeover, on the order of "defeating the St. Louis Rams" (the worst team in the NFL in 2009).

The 2010 election was the last election for the (numerically) 29th district. In December 2010, the United States Census Bureau announced that New York would lose two congressional seats based on the results of the 2010 United States census. It could possibly be dissolved, or renumbered with another county from the east (Tioga County) attached to it while another district (almost certain to be upstate, with candidates being the current 20th, 23rd, 24th or one of the Buffalo districts) is broken up.

- Race ranking and details from CQ Politics
- Campaign contributions from OpenSecrets
- Race profile at The New York Times

=== Polling ===
Poll source	Dates administered	Matt Zeller (D)	Tom Reed (R)	Undecided
Siena	September 14–16, 2010	30%	44%	26%
We Ask America	April 20, 2010	24.01%	41.38%	34.62%

==== Predictions ====
Source	Ranking	As of
The Cook Political Report	Likely R (flip)	November 1, 2010
Rothenberg	Likely R (flip)	November 1, 2010
Sabato's Crystal Ball	Likely R (flip)	November 1, 2010
RCP	Likely R (flip)	November 1, 2010
CQ Politics	Safe R (flip)	October 28, 2010
The New York Times	Safe R (flip)	November 1, 2010
FiveThirtyEight	Safe R (flip)	November 1, 2010

=== Results ===
New York's 29th congressional district election, 2010
Party	Candidate	Votes	%
Democratic	Matthew Zeller	79,558	37.86
Working Families	Matthew Zeller	6,541	3.11
Total	Matthew Zeller	86,099	40.97
Republican	Tom Reed	93,167	44.33
Conservative	Tom Reed	13,505	6.43
Independence	Tom Reed	5,642	2.68
Total	Tom Reed	112,314	53.45
None	Blank/void/write-in	11,732	5.58
Total votes		210,145	100
