= 2009 United States House of Representatives elections =

- March 31, 2009 – November 3, 2009

5 of the 435 seats in the United States House of Representatives 218 seats needed for a majority
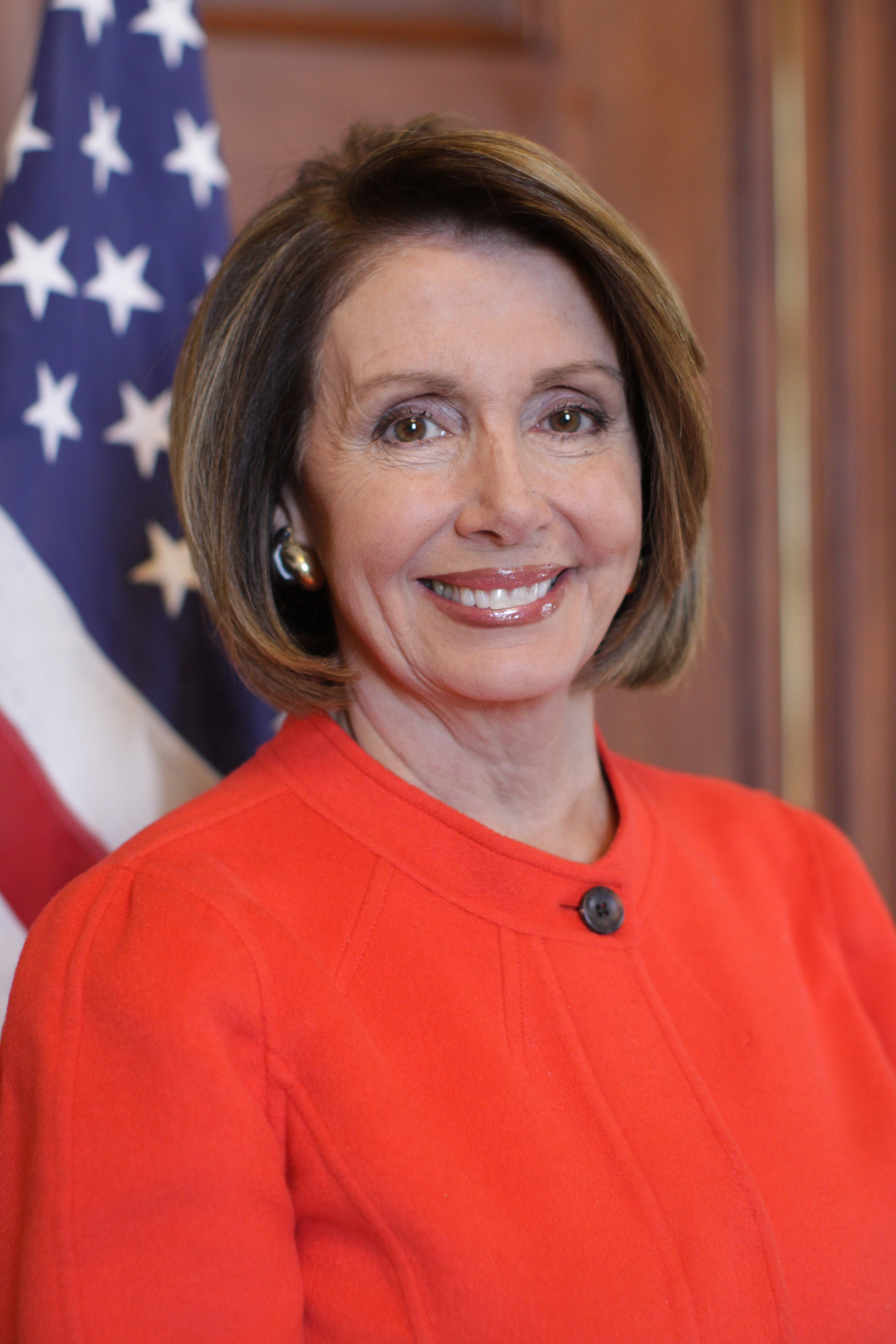

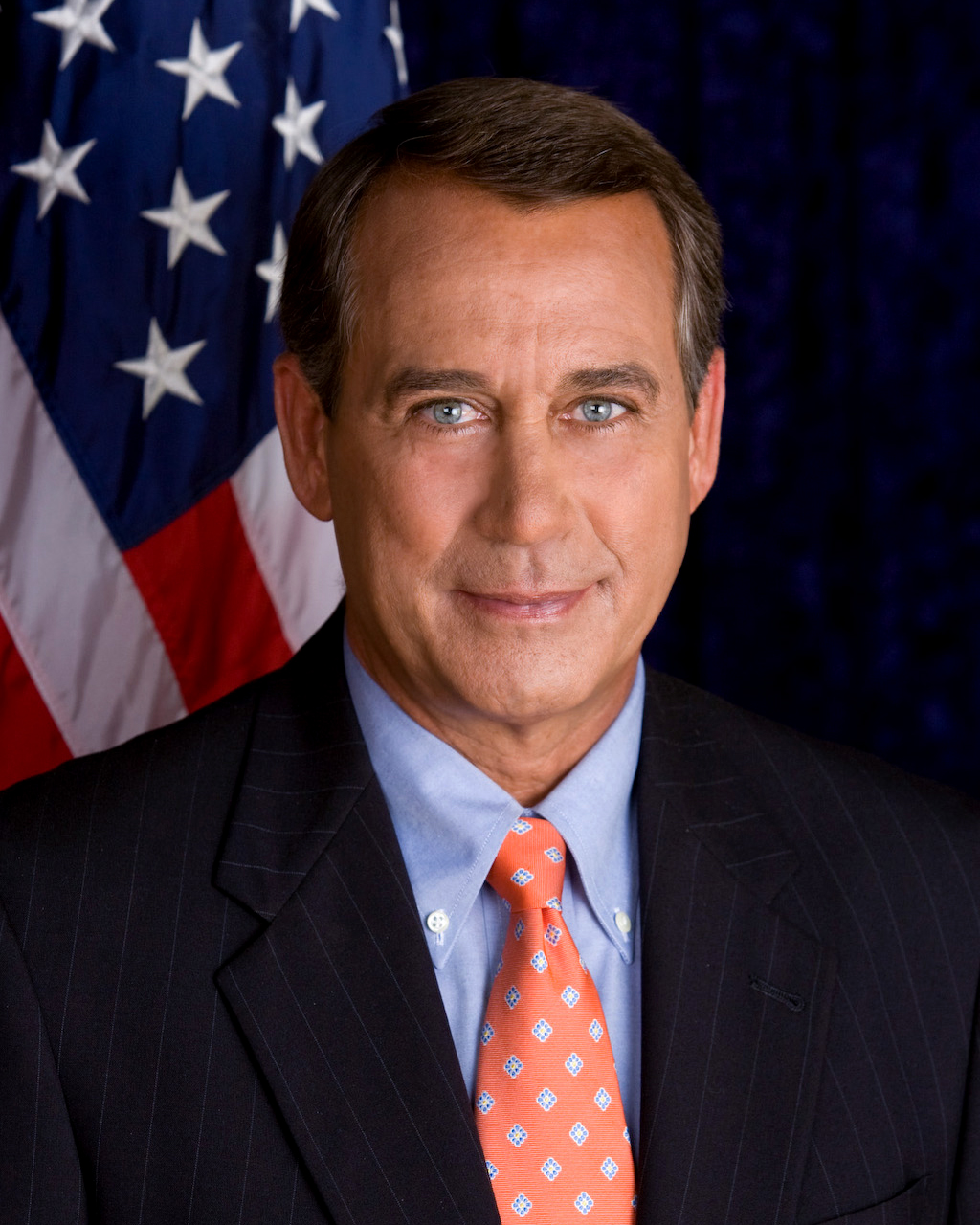
	Majority party	Minority party
Leader	Nancy Pelosi	John Boehner
Party	Democratic	Republican
Leader since	January 3, 2003	January 3, 2007
Leader's seat	California 8th	Ohio 8th
Last election	257 seats	178 seats
Seats won	5	0
Seat change	▲1	▼1
Popular vote	256,360	154,344
Percentage	49.27%	29.66%
	Third party
Party	Conservative
Last election	0 seats
Seats won	0
Seat change	Steady
Popular vote	80,885
Percentage	15.55%

There were five special elections to the United States House of Representatives in 2009 during the 111th United States Congress.

One seat has switched parties, from Republican to Democratic, as the result of a special election.

== Summary ==
Elections are listed by date and district.

District	Incumbent			This race	
District	Member	Party	First elected	Results	Candidates
New York 20	Kirsten Gillibrand	Democratic	2006	Incumbent resigned January 26, 2009 to become U.S. senator. New member elected March 31, 2009. Democratic hold.	▌ ✓ Scott Murphy (Democratic) 50.23%; ▌Jim Tedisco (Republican) 49.77%
Illinois 5	Rahm Emanuel	Democratic	2002	Incumbent won reelection, but resigned January 2, 2009 at the end of the previous Congress after appointed to become White House Chief of Staff. New member elected April 4, 2009. Democratic hold.	▌ ✓ Mike Quigley (Democratic) 69.25%; ▌Rosanna Pulido (Republican) 24.16%; ▌Matt Reichel (Green) 6.60%
California 32	Hilda Solis	Democratic	2000	Incumbent resigned February 24, 2009, to become U.S. Secretary of Labor. New member elected July 14, 2009. Democratic hold.	▌ ✓ Judy Chu (Democratic) 61.85%; ▌Betty Chu (Republican) 32.96%; ▌Christopher Agrella (Libertarian) 5.18%
California 10	Ellen Tauscher	Democratic	1996	Incumbent resigned June 26, 2009, to become U.S. Under Secretary of State for Arms Control and International Security. New member elected November 3, 2009. Democratic hold.	▌ ✓ John Garamendi (Democratic) 52.85%; ▌David Harmer (Republican) 42.83%; Others: ▌Jeremy Cloward (Green) 1.83%; ▌Mary McIlroy (Peace and Freedom) 1.34%; ▌Jerome Denham (American Independent) 1.15%
New York 23	John M. McHugh	Republican	1992	Incumbent resigned September 21, 2009, to become U.S. Secretary of the Army. New member elected November 3, 2009. Democratic gain.	▌ ✓ Bill Owens (Democratic) 48.35%; ▌Doug Hoffman (Conservative) 45.98%; ▌Dede Scozzafava (Republican) 5.67%

== New York's 20th congressional district ==
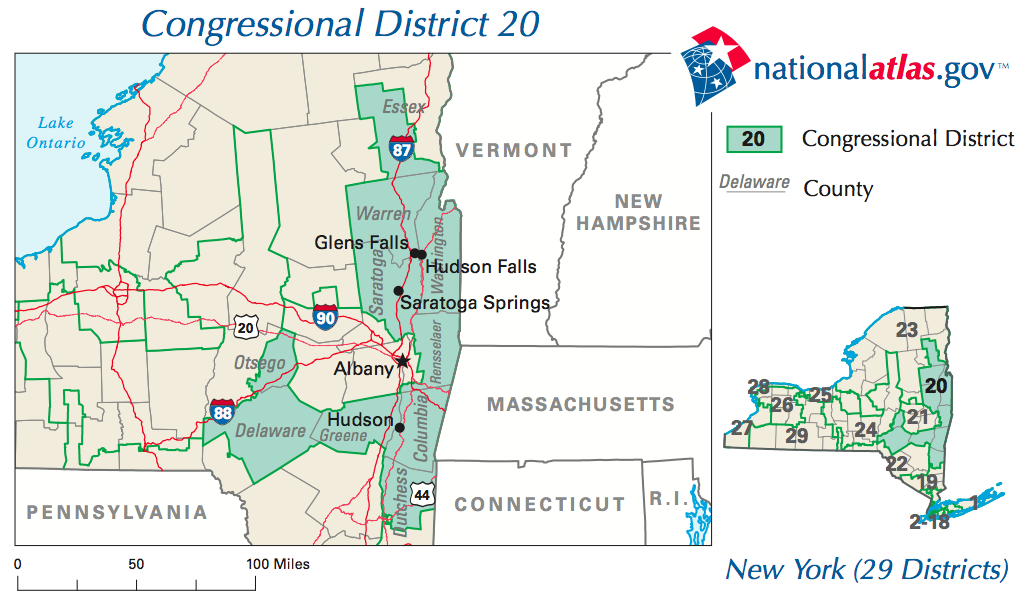
New York's 20th congressional district

On January 26, 2009, Democrat Kirsten Gillibrand resigned when appointed to fill Hillary Clinton's U.S. Senate seat. Scott Murphy, a fellow Democrat, won the election held March 31, 2009, defeating Republican Jim Tedisco by fewer than 700 votes. Because of the slim margin, Tedisco did not concede the race until more than three weeks later, when overseas ballots had been counted.

2009 New York's 20th congressional district special election
Party	Candidate	Votes	%
Democratic	Scott Murphy	70,240	43.64
Independence	Scott Murphy	6,754	4.20
Working Families	Scott Murphy	3,839	2.39
Total	Scott Murphy	80,833	50.23
Republican	Jim Tedisco	68,775	42.73
Conservative	Jim Tedisco	11,332	7.04
Total	Jim Tedisco	80,107	49.77
Majority		726	0.45
Total votes		160,940	100.00
Democratic hold			

== Illinois's 5th congressional district ==
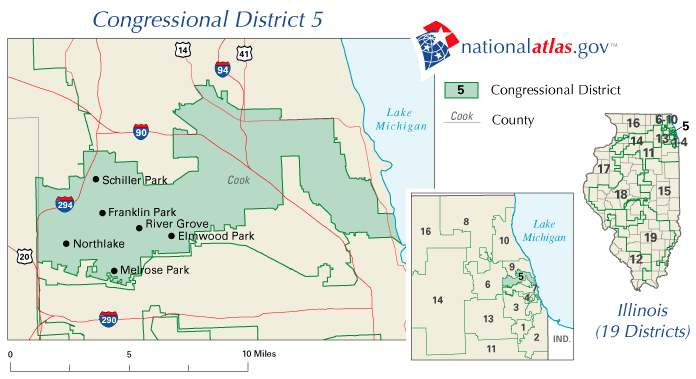
Illinois's 5th congressional district

On January 2, 2009, Democrat Rahm Emanuel resigned one day before the end of the previous Congress after being named White House Chief of Staff. Democrat Mike Quigley won the election April 7, 2009 election to replace him, handily defeating Republican Rosanna Pulido with better than a two-to-one share of the vote.

2009 Illinois's 5th congressional district special election
Party	Candidate	Votes	%
Democratic	Mike Quigley	30,561	69.25
Republican	Rosanna Pulido	10,662	24.16
Green	Matt Reichel	2,911	6.60
Majority		19,899	45.09
Total votes		44,134	100.00
Democratic hold			

== California's 32nd congressional district ==
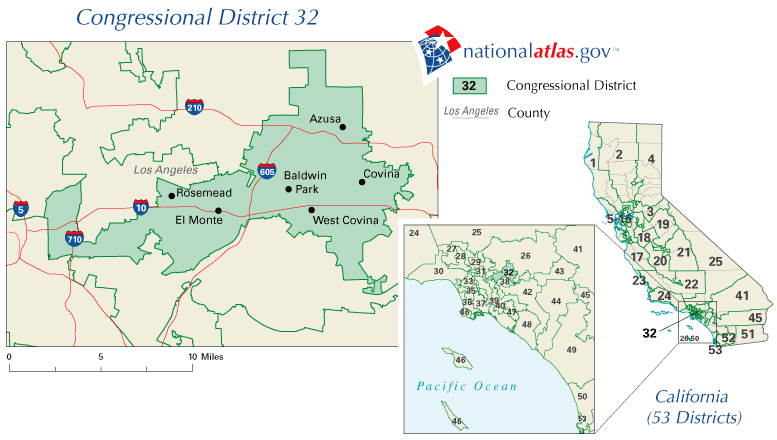
California's 32nd congressional district

On February 24, 2009, Democrat Hilda Solis resigned to become United States Secretary of Labor. Judy Chu, also a Democrat, won the election, defeating Republican Betty Chu by a wide margin.

2009 California's 32nd congressional district special election
Party	Candidate	Votes	%
Democratic	Judy Chu	16,194	61.85
Republican	Betty Chu	8,630	32.96
Libertarian	Christopher Agrella	1,356	5.18
Write-in	Eleanor Garcia	2	0.01
Majority		7,564	28.89
Total votes		26,182	100.00
Democratic hold			

== California's 10th congressional district ==
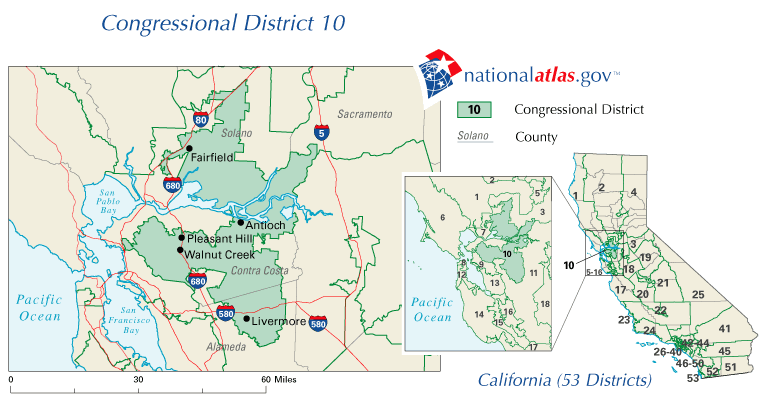
California's 10th congressional district

On June 26, 2009, Democrat Ellen Tauscher resigned to become Undersecretary of State for Arms Control and International Security. Democrat John Garamendi held the seat for the Democrats on November 3, 2009, defeating Republican David Harmer.

2009 California's 10th congressional district special election
Party	Candidate	Votes	%
Democratic	John Garamendi	72,817	52.85
Republican	David Harmer	59,017	42.83
Green	Jeremy Cloward	2,515	1.83
Peace and Freedom	Mary McIlroy	1,846	1.34
American Independent	Jerome Denham	1,591	1.15
Majority		13,800	10.02
Total votes		137,786	100.00
Democratic hold			

== New York's 23rd congressional district ==
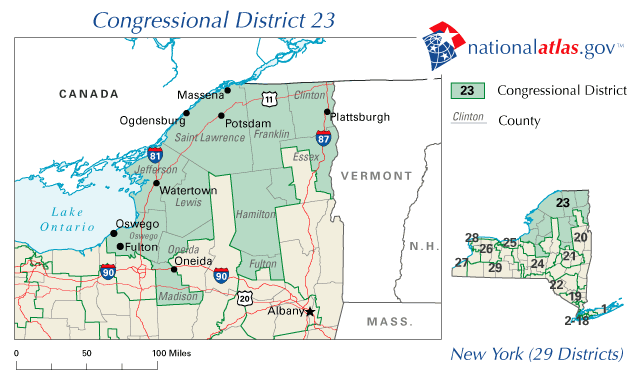
New York's 23rd congressional district

On September 21, 2009, Republican John M. McHugh resigned to become United States Secretary of the Army. On November 3, 2009, Democrat Bill Owens defeated Conservative Doug Hoffman and Republican Dede Scozzafava in a race that garnered considerable press attention. Days before the election, Scozzafava dropped out of the race, then endorsed Owens, the Democrat.

2009 New York's 23rd congressional district special election
Party	Candidate	Votes	%
Democratic	Bill Owens	66,548	43.99
Working Families	Bill Owens	6,589	4.36
Total	Bill Owens	73,137	48.35
Conservative	Doug Hoffman	69,553	45.98
Republican	Dede Scozzafava	7,260	4.80
Independence	Dede Scozzafava	1,322	0.87
Total	Dede Scozzafava	8,582	5.67
Majority		3,584	2.37
Total votes		151,272	100.00
Democratic gain from Republican			

== See also ==
- List of special elections to the United States Senate
- List of special elections to the United States House of Representatives
- 2010 United States Senate elections
