= 2009 United States elections =

- ← 2007 2008 2009 2010 2011 → Off-year elections
- Election day: November 3

Congressional special elections
- Seats contested: 5
- Net seat change: Democratic +1

Gubernatorial elections
- Seats contested: 3 (2 states, 1 territory)
- Net seat change: Republican +2
- 2009 gubernatorial election results map

Legend
- Republican gain Covenant hold

Elections were held in the United States on November 3. During this off-year election, the only seats up for election in the United States Congress were special elections held throughout the year. In total, only the seat representing New York's 23rd congressional district changed party hands, increasing the Democratic Party's majority over the Republicans in the United States House of Representatives, 258–177.

However, there were also several gubernatorial races and state legislative elections, and numerous citizen initiatives, mayoral races in several major cities, and several types of local offices on the ballot.

Although the number of elections was relatively small considering it was an off-year election, Republicans dominated, flipping the gubernatorial seats in both Virginia and New Jersey. These results represented the first in a pattern of Republican dominance in non-general election years during the Obama presidency. Just one year later in 2010 Republicans gained 63 seats in the House of Representatives, six Senate seats, and 12 Governor's Mansions (net +6 gain). The pattern was repeated in 2014 when Republicans won unified control of Congress.

== Federal elections ==
In total, there were five special elections to the United States House of Representatives during 2009. The only election which changed party hands (from Republican to Democratic) was in New York's 23rd congressional district.

Also, a primary election was held in Massachusetts on December 8, 2009, for the senate seat left open by the death of U.S. Senator Ted Kennedy; the general special election for that later seat occurred on January 19, 2010.

== State elections ==
=== Gubernatorial elections ===
New Jersey and Virginia, along with the U.S. territory of the Northern Mariana Islands, held gubernatorial elections in 2009. Both governorships in New Jersey and Virginia changed party hands from Democrat to Republican. This is the last time, both governors flipped parties in the same election. Meanwhile, the local Covenant Party maintained control of the governorship of the Northern Mariana Islands. This is the last time this seat would be up in an off-year.

=== State legislative ===
Legislative elections were held for the New Jersey General Assembly, the Virginia House of Delegates, and the Northern Mariana Islands Commonwealth Legislature. Both chambers of the Northern Mariana Islands legislature were up, which remains the last time they were up in this class of elections.

Democrats maintained control of the lower house of the New Jersey legislature, and Republicans did so in the lower chamber in Virginia. This remains the last time Democrats won more state legislative chambers and seats than Republicans until 2026.

== Local elections ==
Cities, counties, school boards, special districts, and others elected members in 2009. Several large cities held mayoral elections in 2009, including: New York City, Boston, Los Angeles, Houston, Minneapolis, Seattle, San Antonio, and Detroit. Memphis, Tennessee also had a special election to replace former mayor Willie Herenton.

Some of these mayoral elections included the following:

- Albuquerque, New Mexico – Richard J. Berry (R) defeated Incumbent Mayor Martin Chavez (D).
- Albany, New York – Incumbent Mayor Gerald Jennings (D) defeated Working Families Party candidate Corey Ellis and Nathan LeBron (R).
- Anchorage, Alaska – Dan Sullivan (R) was elected mayor.
- Atlanta, Georgia – Mayor Shirley Franklin (D) was term-limited. Kasim Reed (D) defeated Mary Norwood (D) in a runoff election.
- Austin, Texas – Incumbent Mayor Will Wynn (D) was term-limited.
- Boston, Massachusetts – Incumbent Mayor Thomas Menino (D) defeated Michael F. Flaherty (D).
- Buffalo, New York – Incumbent Mayor Byron Brown (D) defeated Michael Kearns (D).
- Charlotte, North Carolina – Anthony Foxx (D) defeated John Lassiter (R)
- Detroit, Michigan – Incumbent Mayor Dave Bing (D) defeated Tom Barrow (D)
- Henderson, Nevada – Incumbent Mayor James B. Gibson (D) was term-limited. He was succeeded by Democrat Andy Hafen.
- Houston, Texas – Incumbent Mayor Bill White (D) was term-limited. In a runoff election, Annise Parker (D) defeated Gene Locke (D).
- Jersey City, New Jersey- Incumbent Mayor Jerramiah Healy (D) defeated Louis Manzo (D), L. Harvey Smith (D) and other minor candidates.
- Lancaster, Pennsylvania – Incumbent Mayor Rick Gray (D) defeated Charlie Smithgall (R).
- Los Angeles, California – Incumbent Mayor Antonio Villaraigosa (D) defeated Walter Moore (R).
- Manchester, New Hampshire – Ted Gatsas (R) elected mayor succeeding mayor Frank Guinta (R).
- Minneapolis, Minnesota – Incumbent Mayor R.T. Rybak (DFL) was re-elected.
- New York City, New York – Incumbent Mayor Michael Bloomberg (I) was re-elected.
- North Las Vegas, Nevada – Incumbent Mayor Mike Montandon (R) was term-limited. He was succeeded by Republican Shari Buck.
- Omaha, Nebraska – City councilman Jim Suttle was elected mayor after incumbent Mike Fahey declined to run for re-election.
- Pittsburgh, Pennsylvania – Incumbent Mayor Luke Ravenstahl (D) was re-elected.
- Rochester, New York – Incumbent Mayor Robert Duffy (D) was unopposed. (The next year, he was elected Lieutenant Governor of New York.)
- San Antonio, Texas – Incumbent Mayor Phil Hardberger was term-limited. He was succeeded by Democrat Julian Castro.
- Seattle, Washington – Incumbent Mayor Greg Nickels (D) defeated in the primary in August 2009. Mike McGinn (D) defeated Joe Mallahan (D).
- St. Paul, Minnesota – Incumbent Mayor Chris Coleman (DFL) was re-elected.
- Syracuse, New York – Incumbent Matt Driscoll (D) was term limited. Stephanie Miner (D) defeated Steve Kimatian (R) and Conservative Otis Jennings.
- Tulsa, Oklahoma – Mayor Kathy Taylor did not seek re-election. Dewey F. Bartlett, Jr. (R) defeated Tom Adelson (D).
