= Clinton Merriam =

Clinton Merriam is the name of:

- Clinton L. Merriam (1824–1900), U.S. Representative from New York
- Clinton Hart Merriam (1855–1942), son of Clinton L. Merriam, American zoologist, ornithologist, entomologist and ethnographer
