= Ambrose Clark =

Ambrose Clark may refer to:

- F. Ambrose Clark (1880–1964), American equestrian
- Ambrose W. Clark (1810–1887), U.S. Representative from New York
