= Albert B. Rossdale =

American politician (1878–1968)

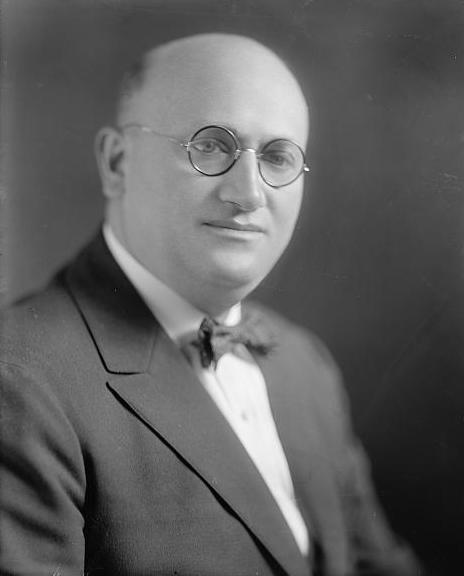

Member of the U.S. House of Representatives from New York's 23rd district
- In office March 4, 1921 – March 3, 1923
- Preceded by: Richard F. McKiniry
- Succeeded by: Frank A. Oliver

Personal details
- Born: Albert Berger Rossdale; October 23, 1878 New York City, U.S.
- Died: April 17, 1968 (aged 89) Eastchester, New York, U.S.
- Resting place: Maimonides Cemetery, Elmont, New York, U.S.
- Party: Republican
- Profession: Politician

Albert Berger Rossdale (October 23, 1878 – April 17, 1968) was a U.S. representative from New York.

Born in New York City, Rossdale attended the public schools. He served as clerk in the New York post office 1900-1910. He served as president of the New York Federation of Post Office Clerks in 1906 and 1907 and vice president of the national organization in 1908 and 1909. He engaged in the wholesale jewelry business in 1910.

Rossdale was elected as a Republican to the Sixty-seventh Congress (March 4, 1921 – March 3, 1923). He was an unsuccessful candidate for reelection in 1922 to the Sixty-eighth Congress and for election in 1924 to the Sixty-ninth Congress. He served as delegate to the Republican State conventions in 1922 and 1924. He served as delegate to the Republican National Convention in 1924. He again engaged in the wholesale jewelry business. He moved to Sandy Hook, Connecticut, in 1939 and to Bronxville, New York, in 1946. He died in Eastchester, New York, April 17, 1968. He was interred in Maimonides Cemetery, Elmont, New York.

== See also ==
- List of Jewish members of the United States Congress

== Sources ==
- United States Congress. "Albert B. Rossdale (id: R000457)". Biographical Directory of the United States Congress.

U.S. House of Representatives
Preceded by Richard F. McKiniry	Member of the U.S. House of Representatives from New York's 23rd congressional district March 4, 1921 - March 3, 1923	Succeeded by Frank A. Oliver
