= Dede Scozzafava =

American politician (born 1960)

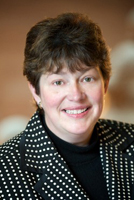

Member of the New York State Assembly from the 122nd district
- In office 1999–2011
- Preceded by: Chloe O'Neil
- Succeeded by: Ken Blankenbush

Personal details
- Born: Dierdre Kathryn Scozzafava; April 28, 1960 (age 66) Buffalo, New York, U.S.
- Party: Republican (before 2009); Democratic (2009–present)
- Spouse: Ron McDougall
- Education: Boston University (B.Sc), Clarkson University (MBA)
- Profession: Politician

Dierdre Kathryn "Dede" Scozzafava (/ˈdiːdi skoʊzəˈfɑːvə/ DEE-dee SKOH-zə-FAH-və; born April 28, 1960) is an American politician in New York. She represented District 122 in the New York State Assembly from 1999 to 2010. Scozzafava held office as a member of the Republican Party, but later became a member of the Democratic Party.

Scozzafava was the Republican nominee for the U.S. House of Representatives in New York's 23rd congressional district in a 2009 special election. She faced opposition from some Republican and conservative figures who deemed her too liberal to receive their support. While Scozzafava held an early lead in the polls, she later fell behind Conservative Party candidate Doug Hoffman and Democratic candidate Bill Owens and suspended her campaign shortly before the election; she then threw her support to Owens, the eventual winner. The election received significant national attention, and was alternately described as "a referendum on President Barack Obama" and "a fight over the identity of the Republican Party." The race was also noteworthy due to the Tea Party movement influence on its outcome. A week after the 2009 election, Scozzafava was stripped of her Republican leadership position in the State Assembly. Scozzafava later announced that she would not seek re-election in 2010.

In January 2011, Scozzafava was appointed as the New York Deputy Secretary of State for Local Government by Democratic Governor Andrew M. Cuomo. She held that post until June 2016. Scozzafava was later appointed as a commissioner of the New York State Division of Tax Appeals Tribunal.

== Early life, education, and business career ==
Scozzafava was born in Buffalo, New York and raised in Gouverneur. She holds a Bachelor of Science degree from the Boston University School of Management, as well as a Master of Business Administration from the Clarkson University Graduate School of Management. She has served as vice president of Seaway Capital Partners, "a company owned by her family".

== Political career ==
=== Early career ===
Prior to her election to the State Assembly, Scozzafava served as a member of the Gouverneur Board of Trustees for four years and was the Mayor of Gouverneur from 1993 to 1998.

=== New York State Assembly ===
Scozzafava served in the State Assembly from 1999 to 2010, representing Assembly District 122 in New York's North Country. A liberal to moderate Republican during her Assembly tenure, Scozzafava supported abortion and same-sex marriage. She also had strong ties to organized labor. In agreement with most Republicans, Scozzafava opposed cap-and-trade and favored maintaining the Bush tax cuts. Scozzafava opposed gun control and had a lifetime "A" rating from the National Rifle Association of America.

In April 2010, Scozzafava announced that she would not seek re-election to the Assembly in November 2010.

=== 2008 State Senate election ===
Scozzafava considered running in a special election for the 48th state Senate district, which included most of the northwestern portion of her former Assembly district, in 2008. However, area Republicans chose Assemblyman William A. Barclay, in part because they thought Scozzafava would be seen as too socially liberal. Barclay lost the election to Democratic Assemblyman Darrel Aubertine, and some Republican operatives said that Scozzafava should have been the Republican candidate. In February 2008, Scozzafava was reportedly approached by Democrats about switching parties after she was passed over for the Republican nomination in the 48th Senate district special election.

=== 2009 U.S. House of Representatives campaign ===
Scozzafava's husband, Ron McDougall, reportedly put out feelers to the Democrats about possible support for Scozzafava in a 2009 congressional race in New York's 23rd congressional district in the event that Democratic State Senator Darrel Aubertine opted not to seek the office; the seat was being vacated by John M. McHugh, who resigned upon Senate conformation as the new Secretary of the Army.

On July 22, 2009, Scozzafava was chosen by the 11 Republican Party county chairs located in the 23rd Congressional district to be the Republican nominee for the special election to fill the vacancy in that district.

The Conservative Party of New York State declined to support Scozzafava, who was described by Conservative Party Chairman Mike Long as a "nice lady who is too liberal"; instead, the Conservative Party nominated Doug Hoffman. Many notable Republicans, including former Vice Presidential nominee Sarah Palin, Republican Governor Tim Pawlenty of Minnesota and former U.S. Senator Fred Thompson, endorsed Hoffman rather than Scozzafava because they deemed Scozzafava too liberal and ideologically indistinguishable from the Democratic candidate, Bill Owens. Scozzafava had voted for same-sex marriage in the New York State Assembly, and she had also received an award from a Planned Parenthood affiliate in 2008. Scozzafava's political positions included support for "card check" legislation, support for federal funding for abortion, support for President Obama's 2009 stimulus package, and a refusal to rule out support for health care reform that included a "public option." The Hoffman campaign ran television advertisements depicting Scozzafava and Owens as "two peas in a liberal pod."

Scozzafava's ties to Seaway Capital Partners (a firm which owed nearly $200,000 in back taxes and which was run by her brother) were questioned in connection with her 2009 run. She responded that she had had no direct ties to the company since 2007.

Scozzafava received endorsements from former Speaker of the House Newt Gingrich, Congressman Pete King (R-NY), the National Rifle Association of America (NRA), the Log Cabin Republicans, and New York State United Teachers (NYSUT).

A Siena College poll released on October 1, 2009, showed Scozzafava leading the race with 35% support, followed by Owens with 28%, and Hoffman with 16%. However, a Siena poll released two weeks later indicated that Owens led Scozzafava by four percentage points and Hoffman by 10%. After an October 31 poll showed Scozzafava trailing Hoffman by 15% and Owens by 16%, Scozzafava ended her campaign and released her supporters to "transfer their support as they [saw] fit." The following day, Scozzafava endorsed Bill Owens, calling him "an independent voice who will put New York first." This action put Scozzafava at odds with the Republican National Committee, which had backed Scozzafava prior to her withdrawal but had subsequently declared support for Hoffman. An article in Politico stated that the White House had made a concerted effort to persuade Scozzafava to endorse Owens, dispatching Long Island Congressman Steve Israel, New York Assembly Speaker Sheldon Silver, and New York Attorney General Andrew Cuomo to request her support. At the meeting, Scozzafava reportedly told Cuomo that he would be "the next governor of New York." According to the Watertown Daily Times, New York's senior U.S. Senator, Democrat Chuck Schumer, was also among those who lobbied Scozzafava for an endorsement of Owens.

On Election Day, Bill Owens prevailed over Hoffman by a margin of 48.3% to 46%.

==== Aftermath ====
After Scozzafava's unsuccessful congressional campaign, she acknowledged that her name had begun being used as a verb: "scozzafavaed." Commentator Chris Good described the term as follows: "The gist, basically, is that if you're a moderate Republican and the conservative wing of the GOP sets out to get you, and does, you got Scozzafavaed." Brian S. Brown of the National Organization for Marriage has used the term in a similar fashion: "We welcome everyone’s right to participate in the democratic process, but ... [if] you try to elect pro-gay marriage Republicans, we will Dede Scozzafava them." Also, conservative commentators, including Maggie Gallagher, have used the phrase "the Dede effect" to describe Republican lawmakers' fear of alienating their constituents by voting for same-sex marriage legislation.

A week after the 2009 election, Scozzafava was stripped of her Republican leadership position in the New York State Assembly due to her endorsement of Owens. During a November 1, 2009 meeting with Scozzafava, Assembly Speaker Sheldon Silver reportedly pledged that the Democrats would fully support her should she decide to leave the GOP. Scozzafava told WWNY-TV in Watertown on the day after the election that she intended to remain a Republican for the time being; she also acknowledged that she felt betrayed by the national GOP for its quick endorsement of Hoffman following her exit from the race.

In April 2010, Scozzafava announced that she would not seek re-election to the Assembly in November 2010. Scozzafava endorsed Democrat Brian McGrath to fill her seat in New York's 122nd Assembly District, and McGrath was defeated by Republican Ken Blankenbush.

=== Post-Assembly career ===
In January 2011, Scozzafava was appointed as the New York Deputy Secretary of State for Local Government by Governor Andrew M. Cuomo and held that position until June 2016. In 2016, she was nominated by Governor Cuomo and confirmed by the State Senate to serve as a Commissioner on the New York State Tax Appeals Tribunal.

Scozzafava eventually switched parties and became a Democrat.

== Personal life ==
Scozzafava is married to Ron McDougall.

New York State Assembly
Preceded by Chloe Ann O'Neil	Member from the 112th district 1999–2002	Succeeded by Roy McDonald
Preceded by Clifford Crouch	Member from the 122nd district 2003–2010	Succeeded by Kenneth Blankenbush
