= William A. Gilbert =

American politician

Member of the U.S. House of Representatives from New York's 23rd district
- In office March 4, 1855 – February 27, 1857
- Preceded by: Caleb Lyon
- Succeeded by: Charles B. Hoard

Personal details
- Born: William Augustus Gilbert; January 25, 1815 Gilead, Connecticut, U.S.
- Died: May 25, 1875 (aged 60) Adams, New York, U.S.
- Party: Republican
- Other political affiliations: Whig

William Augustus Gilbert (January 25, 1815 – May 25, 1875) was a U.S. representative from New York.

== Biography ==
Born in Gilead, Connecticut, Gilbert moved with his parents to Champion, New York.

He attended the public schools. He studied law. He was admitted to the New York bar in 1843 and commenced the practice of law in Adams, New York.

Active in the Whig Party, he was a member of the New York State Assembly (Jefferson Co., 1st D.) in 1851 and 1852.

Gilbert was elected as a Whig candidate to the Thirty-fourth Congress and served from March 4, 1855, until his resignation February 27, 1857. While in the House Gilbert was accused of corruption, along with members William W. Welch, Francis S. Edwards, and Orsamus B. Matteson. They were accused of accepting money, land and stock in exchange for procuring the passage of a bill granting land for the construction of a railroad in Iowa. Gilbert was also accused of agreeing to procure passage of a bill authorizing publication of a book containing details on federal military pension and land bounty laws in exchange for the author dividing the proceeds with him. Gilbert protested the proceedings, and then resigned with four days left in his term rather than face an expulsion vote.

Gilbert later became a Republican. He served as president of Adams village in 1859 and 1860.

He engaged in the banking business and was also active in other ventures, including railroads.

He died in Adams, New York on May 25, 1875. He was interred in the Rural Cemetery.

New York State Assembly
Preceded by John Winslow	New York State Assembly; Jefferson County, 1st District; 1851–1852	Succeeded by James Gifford
U.S. House of Representatives
Preceded by Caleb Lyon	Member of the U.S. House of Representatives from New York's 23rd congressional district March 4, 1855 – February 27, 1857	Succeeded by Charles B. Hoard
