= Frank A. Oliver =

American politician

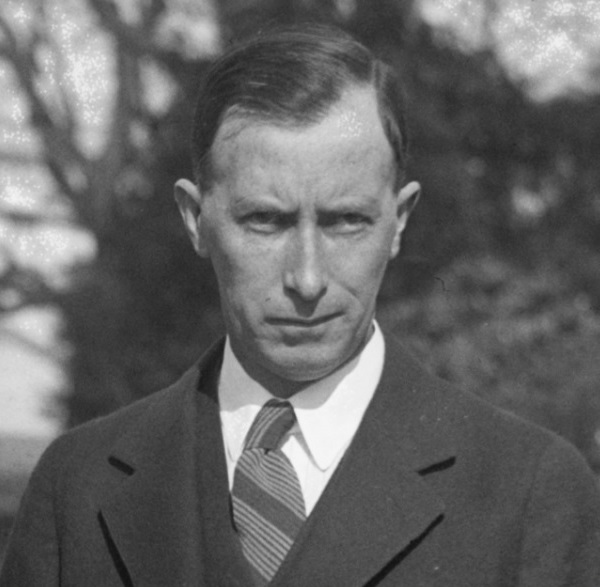

Member of the U.S. House of Representatives from New York's 23rd district
- In office March 4, 1923 – June 18, 1934

Personal details
- Born: October 2, 1883 New York City, US
- Died: January 1, 1968 (aged 84) The Bronx, New York, US
- Resting place: Calvary Cemetery, Woodside, Queens
- Party: Democratic

Frank Oliver (October 2, 1883 – January 1, 1968) was an American lawyer and politician who served 6 terms as a U.S. representative from New York from 1923 to 1934.

== Early life and education ==
Born in New York City, Oliver attended the public schools and the Morris High School (Bronx, New York). He graduated from Fordham University at New York City in 1905, and studied law at the New York Law School. He was admitted to the bar in 1908 and commenced practice in New York City.

== Career ==
On December 1, 1908, he was appointed chief of the bureau of licenses for New York City. He served until April 16, 1911, when he resigned to become secretary to United States Senator James A. O'Gorman of New York, in which capacity he served until his resignation on January 3, 1916.

He was appointed chief clerk to the magistrates' courts of New York City and served from January 3, 1916, until December 31, 1919.

He was appointed assistant district attorney for Bronx County on January 1, 1920, and served until February 28, 1923, when he resigned, having been elected to Congress.

=== Congress ===
Oliver was elected as a Democrat to the Sixty-eighth and to the five succeeding Congresses and served from March 4, 1923, until his resignation on June 18, 1934.

=== Judge ===
He was appointed on June 19, 1934, justice of the court of special sessions, in which capacity he served until his retirement April 6, 1952.

== Death ==
He died in the Bronx, New York, January 1, 1968. He was interred in Calvary Cemetery, Woodside, Queens.

U.S. House of Representatives
Preceded by Albert B. Rossdale	Member of the U.S. House of Representatives from New York's 23rd congressional district March 4, 1923 – June 18, 1934	Succeeded by Charles A. Buckley
