= Richard F. McKiniry =

American politician

Richard McKiniry
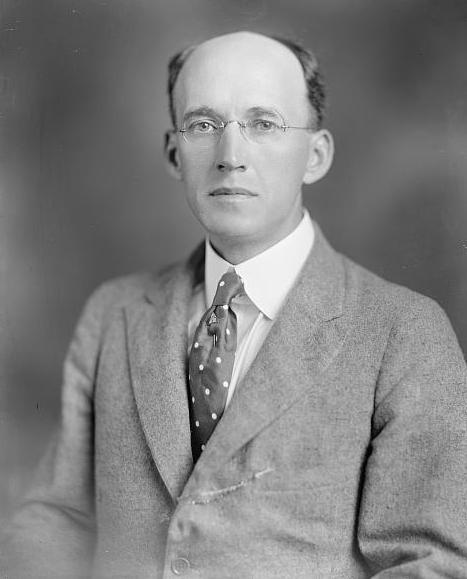

Member of the U.S. House of Representatives from New York's 23rd district
- In office March 4, 1919 – March 3, 1921
- Preceded by: Daniel C. Oliver
- Succeeded by: Albert B. Rossdale

Personal details
- Born: March 23, 1878 New York City
- Died: May 30, 1950 (aged 72) Yonkers, New York
- Resting place: Calvery Cemetery, Long Island, New York
- Party: Democratic Party
- Education: New York Law School

Richard Francis Mckiniry (March 23, 1878 – May 30, 1950) was an American lawyer and politician who served one term as a U.S. representative from New York from 1919 to 1921.

== Biography ==
Born in New York City, Mckiniry attended the public schools. He graduated from the College of St. Francis Xavier, New York City, and from the New York Law School. He was admitted to the bar in 1899 and commenced the practice of his profession in New York City.

He served as assistant District Attorney of Bronx County 1914–1917. Secretary of the State supreme court, first district from 1917 to 1919.

=== Congress ===
Mckiniry was elected as a Democrat to the Sixty-sixth Congress (March 4, 1919 – March 3, 1921). He was an unsuccessful candidate for reelection in 1920 to the Sixty-seventh Congress.

=== Later career and death ===
He was appointed a magistrate of New York City on January 1, 1923, and served until August 15, 1943, when he retired due to ill health.

He died in Yonkers, New York, May 30, 1950. He was interred in Calvary Cemetery, Long Island City, New York.

== Sources ==
- United States Congress. "Richard F. McKiniry (id: M000517)". Biographical Directory of the United States Congress.

U.S. House of Representatives
Preceded by Daniel C. Oliver	Member of the U.S. House of Representatives from New York's 23rd congressional district March 4, 1919 – March 3, 1921	Succeeded by Albert B. Rossdale
