= Charles B. Hoard =

American politician

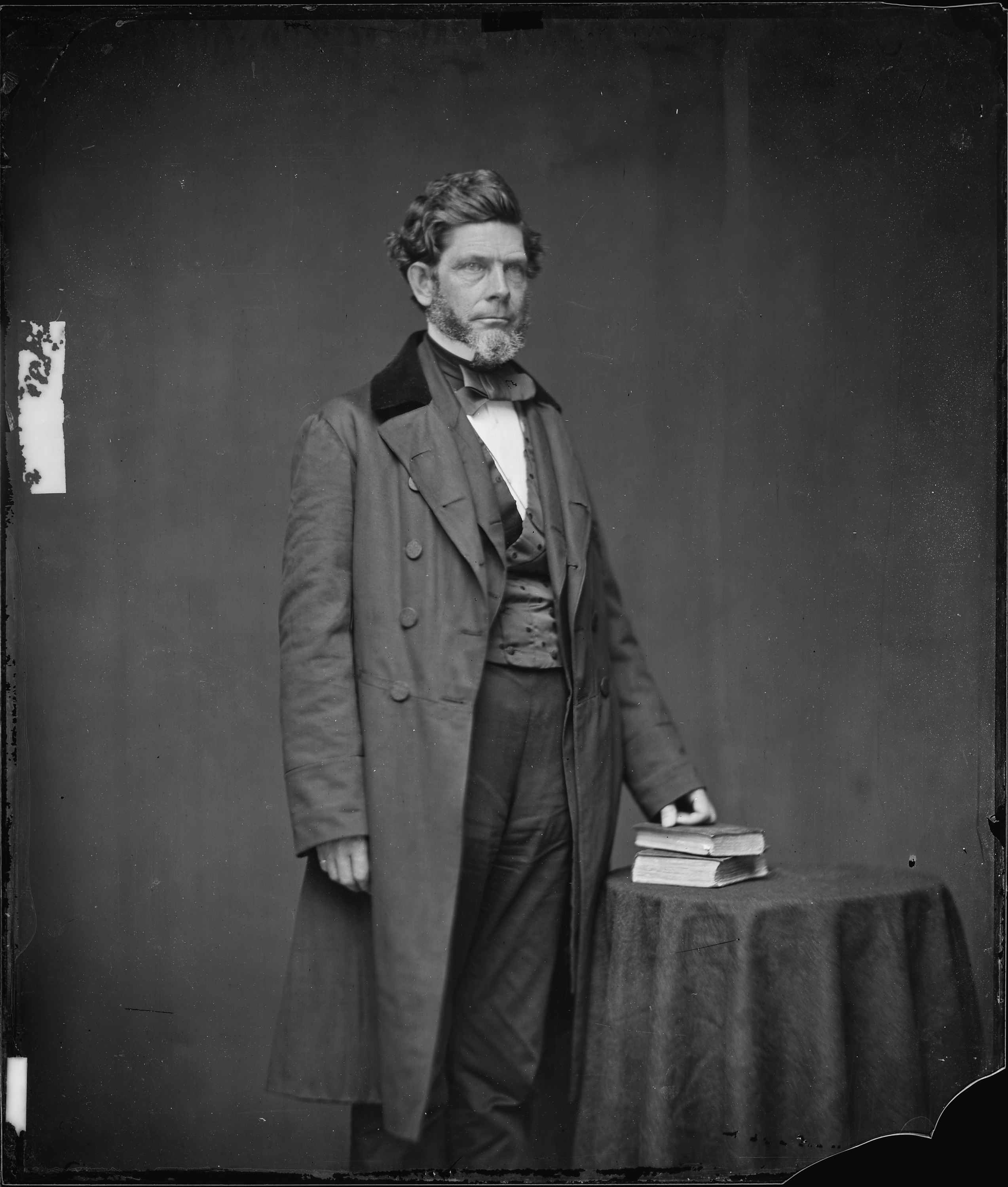

Member of the U.S. House of Representatives from New York's 23rd district
- In office March 4, 1857 – March 3, 1861
- Preceded by: William A. Gilbert
- Succeeded by: Ambrose W. Clark

Personal details
- Born: Charles Brooks Hoard; June 5, 1805 Springfield, Vermont, U.S.
- Died: November 20, 1886 (aged 81) Ceredo, West Virginia, U.S.
- Resting place: Spring Hill Cemetery
- Party: Republican

Charles Brooks Hoard (June 5, 1805 – November 20, 1886) was a U.S. representative from New York.

== Biography ==
Born in Springfield, Vermont, Hoard attended the public schools. He moved to Antwerp, New York, where he trained as a clerk, watch repairer, and mechanic. He was Antwerp's postmaster in the 1830s.

Hoard subsequently established a partnership with Gilbert Bradford, and the firm of Hoard & Bradford became successful as the manufacturer of portable steam engines to operate printing presses and other machines.

Hoard was a member of the New York State Assembly (Jefferson Co.) in 1838.

He moved to Watertown, New York, in January 1844. He served as Clerk of Jefferson County from 1844 to 1846.

Originally a Democrat identified with the Free Soil and Barnburner movements, Hoard's anti-slavery views led him to become a Republican when that party was founded.

Hoard was elected as a Republican to the Thirty-fifth and Thirty-sixth Congresses (March 4, 1857 – March 3, 1861).

During the Civil War he engaged in the manufacture of rifles for the Union. Disputes with the War Department over fulfillment of the contract caused Hoard a financial loss.

Eli Thayer, the founder of Ceredo, West Virginia, had originally established the community as a model town in an effort to show southerners that a community could function without slavery. Thayer had borrowed from Hoard to finance the creation of the town.

In the late 1860s Hoard spent time traveling in the western and southern states to inspect his business concerns. In 1870 he relocated to Ceredo. His efforts to improve the town and repair his fortunes proved successful, with Hoard leading expansion of Ceredo's timber industry, including the building of a sawmill and the construction of roads and railroads.

He died in Ceredo on November 20, 1886. He was interred in Spring Hill Cemetery, Huntington, West Virginia.

== Sources ==
- United States Congress. "Charles B. Hoard (id: H000658)". Biographical Directory of the United States Congress.
- John A. Haddock, The Growth of a Century: as Illustrated in the History of Jefferson County, New York, 1894, pages 43–47

U.S. House of Representatives
| Preceded by William A. Gilbert | Member of the U.S. House of Representatives from New York's 23rd congressional district 1857–1861 | Succeeded by Ambrose W. Clark |
