= Addison H. Laflin =

American politician (1823–1878)

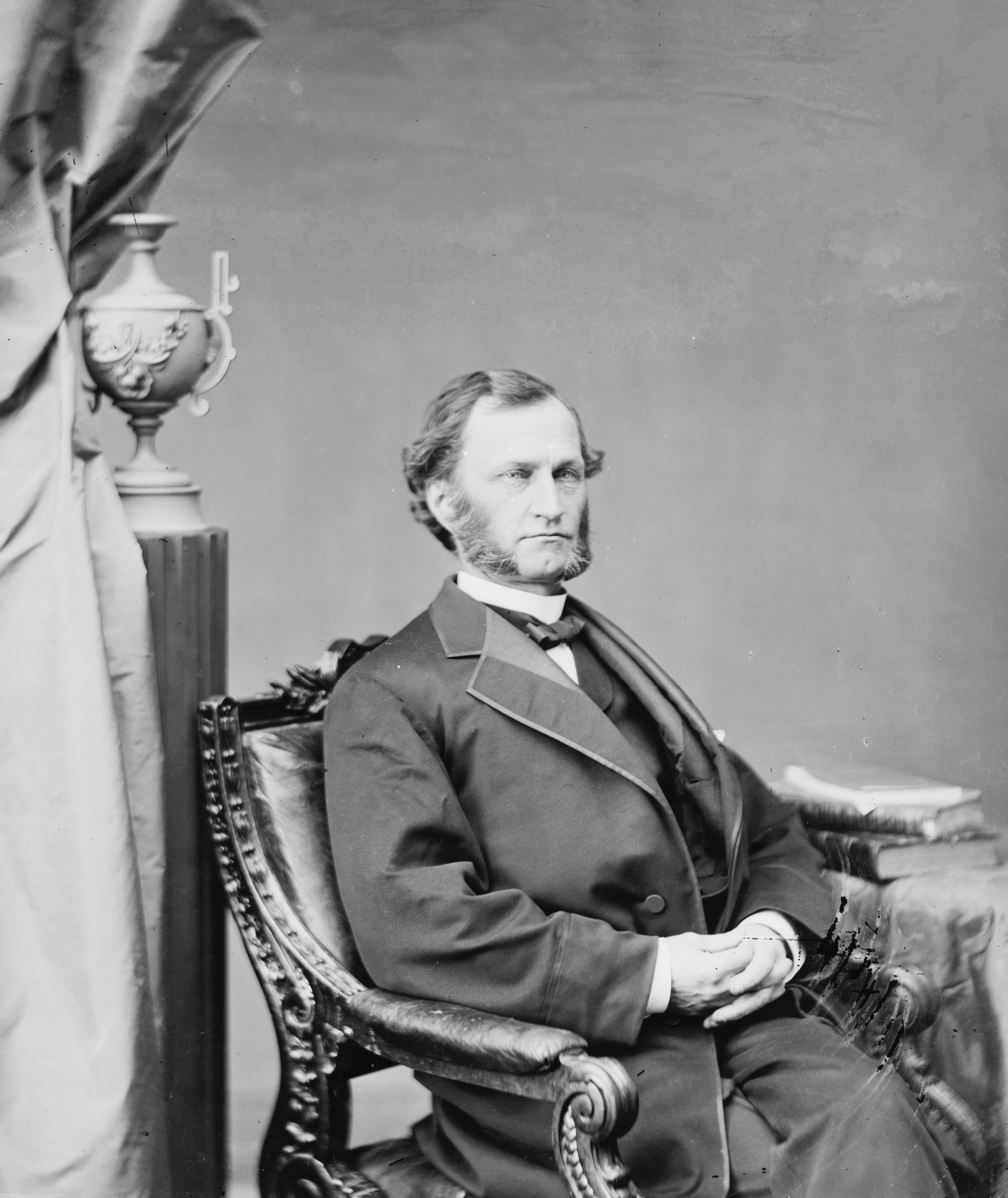
Addison H. Laflin

Addison Henry Laflin (October 24, 1823 – September 24, 1878) was an American printmaker and politician. He served in the New York State Senate in 1858 and 1859. He was then elected as a Republican to the United States Congress, holding office from 1865 to 1871.

== Early life ==
Laflin was born in Lee, Berkshire County, Massachusetts on 24 October 1823, the son of Walter Laflan, a prominent print maker. He attended common schools and graduated from Williams College, Massachusetts in 1843.

== Career ==
Laflin moved to Herkimer, New York. With his brother, Bryon, Laflin became a prominent paper manufacturer. He developed a method of watermarking using a wire belt. However, the method wasn't very popular and in 1857, they sold the Herkimer Mill for a sizeable sum of $70,000.

Laflin served in New York State Senate (20th D.) in 1858 and 1859. He was elected as a Republican to the United States Congress and held office from March 4, 1865, to March 3, 1871. He was also a delegate to the Republican state convention of 1867.

Laflin was appointed Naval Officer of the Port of New York by President Ulysses S. Grant on April 3, 1871. He served in that position until he resigned in 23 January 1877.

== Death ==
Laflin who had been ill, died of suicide in Pittsfield, Massachusetts on 24 September 1878, aged 54. He was buried at the Oakwood Cemetery, Syracuse.

New York State Senate
Preceded by M. Lindley Lee	New York State Senate; 20th District; 1858–1859	Succeeded by Francis M. Rotch
U.S. House of Representatives
Preceded by Ambrose W. Clark	Member of the U.S. House of Representatives from New York's 20th congressional district 1865–1871	Succeeded by Clinton L. Merriam
