= Daniel C. Oliver =

American politician

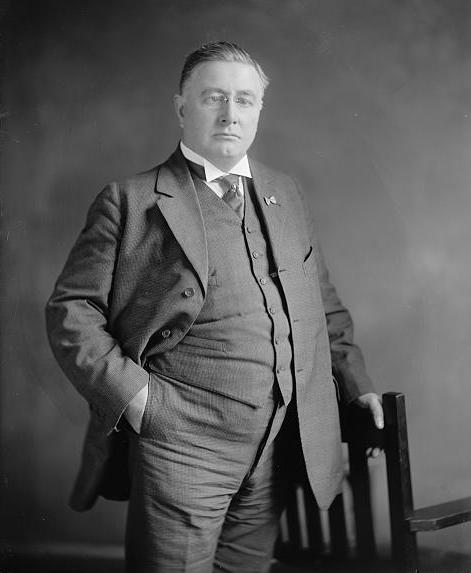
- Oliver, 1917

Member of the New York State Assembly from the 23rd district
- In office January 1, 1915 – December 31, 1916
- Preceded by: Sidney C. Crane
- Succeeded by: Earl A. Smith

Member of the U.S. House of Representatives from New York's 23rd district
- In office March 4, 1917 – March 3, 1919
- Preceded by: William Stiles Bennet
- Succeeded by: Richard F. McKiniry

Personal details
- Born: October 6, 1865 New York, New York, USA
- Died: March 26, 1924 (aged 58) New York, New York, USA
- Resting place: Calvary Cemetery, Woodside, Queens.

Daniel Charles Oliver (October 6, 1865 – March 26, 1924) was an American businessman and politician who served one term in the New York State Assembly from 1917 and 1919.

== Life ==
Born in New York City, Oliver attended public schools and graduated from the College of the City of New York. He served twenty years as a member of the school board. He was an importer of dry goods and also served as member of the Commercial Travelers' Association.

=== Political career ===
He was a member of the New York State Assembly (New York Co., 23rd D.) in 1915 and 1916.

==== Congress ====
Oliver was elected as a Democrat to the 65th United States Congress, holding office from March 4, 1917, to March 3, 1919. He resumed his former business pursuits in New York City.

=== Death ===
He died from pneumonia at his home there on March 26, 1924. He was buried at the Calvary Cemetery in Woodside, Queens.

== Sources ==
- United States Congress. "Daniel C. Oliver (id: O000071)". Biographical Directory of the United States Congress.

New York State Assembly
Preceded by Sidney C. Crane	New York State Assembly; New York County, 23rd District; 1915–1916	Succeeded by Earl A. Smith
U.S. House of Representatives
Preceded by William Stiles Bennet	Member of the U.S. House of Representatives from New York's 23rd congressional district 1917–1919	Succeeded by Richard F. McKiniry
