= Doug Hoffman =

American politician

- Born: Saranac Lake, New York, U.S.
- Education: SUNY, Plattsburgh (B.S.); University of Connecticut (M.B.A.)
- Occupations: C.P.A., tax and financial planning
- Political party: Conservative Party of New York

Douglas L. Hoffman is an American businessman, accountant and former congressional candidate. He was the Conservative Party candidate for the U.S. House of Representatives in the 2009 special election for New York's 23rd congressional district. On November 3, 2009, he was narrowly defeated by Democratic candidate Bill Owens. Hoffman ran for the same seat in Congress in 2010, but lost the Republican primary and withdrew his candidacy.

Hoffman's 2009 campaign received extensive support from the Tea Party movement and gained national attention because of his success in drawing grassroots support away from Republican candidate Dede Scozzafava, who dropped out of the race before Election Day.

== Early life and business career ==
Born in Connecticut, Hoffman is the second of four children of Rita Anderson and Eugene J. Hoffman. Hoffman's parents divorced during his early life, leaving the family in poverty. He grew up in Saranac Lake, New York, and graduated from Saranac Lake High School. In 1973, he received a bachelor's degree in accounting from SUNY Plattsburgh. Hoffman married Carol Torrance in 1973 and moved to Hartford, Connecticut; the Hoffmans have three children: Ashleah, Douglas, and Taylor. During the Vietnam War, Hoffman served in the New York National Guard (1970–73) and was a staff sergeant in the United States Army Reserve (1973–76). Following his college graduation, Hoffman earned a Master of Business Administration degree from the University of Connecticut in 1976 and was accredited as a certified public accountant (CPA). In 1977, Hoffman and his family moved back to the North Country.

Hoffman served as controller for the Lake Placid Olympic Organizing Committee for the 1980 Winter Olympics. Hoffman stated that the 1980 Olympics created jobs and infrastructure that were still driving the area's economy 30 years later.

At the time of his 2009 congressional campaign, Hoffman served as managing partner at Dragon Benware Crowley & Co. In addition, he helped to lead Hoffman Family Enterprises, "a group of 13 companies ranging from investment and real estate firms to hospitality and tourism ventures". Hoffman and his wife resided in Lake Placid.

== Political campaigns ==
=== 2009 congressional campaign ===
After Republican Rep. John McHugh resigned from Congress to serve as Secretary of the Army, the Republican Party chose New York State Assemblywoman Dede Scozzafava as its candidate in the ensuing special election to fill the vacated seat. Hoffman had also sought the Republican nod, and after Scozzafava was chosen, he congratulated her and initially offered his help. On August 7, 2009, the Conservative Party of New York opted to nominate Hoffman for Congress after three other potential candidates said they would support him, despite the fact that Hoffman did not live in the district. The Conservative Party declined to support Scozzafava, who was described by Party Chairman Michael R. Long as a "nice lady who is too liberal". The Democratic Party chose Bill Owens as its candidate.

The race attracted attention across the country because of Hoffman's Tea Party affiliation and because of the large amount of support Hoffman received from the national conservative base despite Hoffman's status as a third-party candidate. Hoffman described himself as a "Reagan conservative," expressing opposition to same-sex marriage, Obamacare, budget deficits, and abortion and support for the war on terror. During the campaign, Hoffman was interviewed by Glenn Beck and Sean Hannity. Many notable Republicans, including former vice presidential nominee Sarah Palin, endorsed Hoffman because they deemed Scozzafava insufficiently conservative and ideologically indistinguishable from the Democrat. To illustrate this point, the Hoffman campaign ran television advertisements depicting Scozzafava and Owens as "two peas in a liberal pod." In October, The Atlantic described Hoffman as "the next (unlikely) conservative superstar". Hoffman received support from the Club for Growth, RedState, former House Majority Leader Dick Armey, former U.S. Sen. Fred Thompson, and columnist Michelle Malkin.

After an October 31 poll showed Scozzafava trailing both Hoffman and Owens by 15% and 16% respectively, with her poll numbers collapsing, Scozzafava suspended her campaign on October 31 and endorsed Owens.

On Election Day, Owens prevailed over Hoffman. While Hoffman initially conceded the race, an initial re-canvass resulted in a Hoffman gain of approximately 2,000 votes. Hoffman withdrew his concession on November 17, 2009 and later accused the Democratic Party and others of ballot tampering. Jerry O. Eaton, Jefferson County Republican elections commissioner, called Hoffman's assertion "absolutely false". With the tallying of absentee-ballots near completion, on November 20, 2009, Owens' lead over Hoffman surpassed the total number of absentee ballots left, making it mathematically impossible for Hoffman to win. On November 24, Hoffman ended his campaign. The final election results showed that Owens prevailed by a margin of 48% to 46%.

The election was alternately described as "a referendum on President Barack Obama" and "a fight over the identity of the Republican Party." The race was also noteworthy due to the Tea Party movement influence on its outcome, and for its impact on same-sex marriage legislation in New York. One commentator stated that Hoffman's third-party candidacy was "striking for how much it has galvanized the Republican Party's base." According to Marilyn Musgrave of Susan B. Anthony List, "Republican party leaders in Washington should take the message of the campaign and the election seriously, that the Party base should not be taken for granted."

=== 2010 congressional campaign ===
Hoffman again ran for the House of Representatives in 2010, but was defeated in the Republican primary for New York's 23rd congressional district by Matt Doheny, a businessman and lawyer. On September 23, 2010, Hoffman announced that he would continue his campaign for the congressional seat as the Conservative Party candidate. However, on October 5, 2010, Hoffman announced that he was dropping out of the race altogether, although his name remained on the ballot. Bill Owens (D) won re-election by less than 4,000 votes, while Hoffman received 9,592 votes on the Conservative Party line. Hoffman has been referred to as a "spoiler" in the 2010 race.
