= Clinton L. Merriam =

American politician (1824–1900)

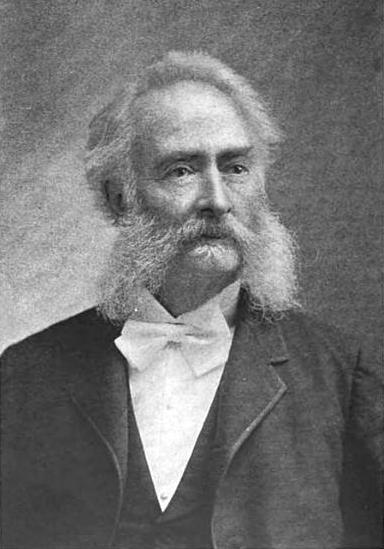

Member of the U.S. House of Representatives from New York
- In office March 4, 1871 – March 3, 1875
- Preceded by: Addison H. Laflin
- Succeeded by: Samuel F. Miller
- Constituency: 20th district (1871–73); 21st district (1873–75)

Personal details
- Born: Clinton Levi Merriam; March 25, 1824 Leyden, New York, U.S.
- Died: February 18, 1900 (aged 75) Washington, D.C., U.S.
- Party: Republican
- Children: Clinton Hart Merriam, Florence Augusta Merriam Bailey

Clinton Levi Merriam (March 25, 1824 – February 18, 1900) was a United States representative from New York.

Merriam was born in Leyden, Lewis County, New York on March 25, 1824. He attended the common schools and Copenhagen Academy, Copenhagen, New York; engaged in mercantile pursuits in Utica, New York; moved to New York City in 1847 and became an importer; engaged in banking in 1860; returned to Leyden in 1864; elected as a Republican to the Forty-second and Forty-third Congresses (March 4, 1871 – March 3, 1875); retired from active business pursuits and lived in retirement at his house, "Homewood", on the family estate, "Locust Grove" near Leyden, New York. He died while on a visit in Washington, D.C., on February 18, 1900; interment in Leyden Hill Cemetery, Port Leyden, New York.

His children include the zoologist Clinton Hart Merriam and the ornithologist Florence Augusta Merriam Bailey.

U.S. House of Representatives
Preceded by Addison H. Laflin	Member of the U.S. House of Representatives from New York's 20th congressional district 1871–1873	Succeeded by David Wilber
Preceded by Ellis H. Roberts	Member of the U.S. House of Representatives from New York's 21st congressional district 1873–1875	Succeeded by Samuel F. Miller
