= 2009 New York's 23rd congressional district special election =

- November 3, 2009

New York's 23rd congressional district
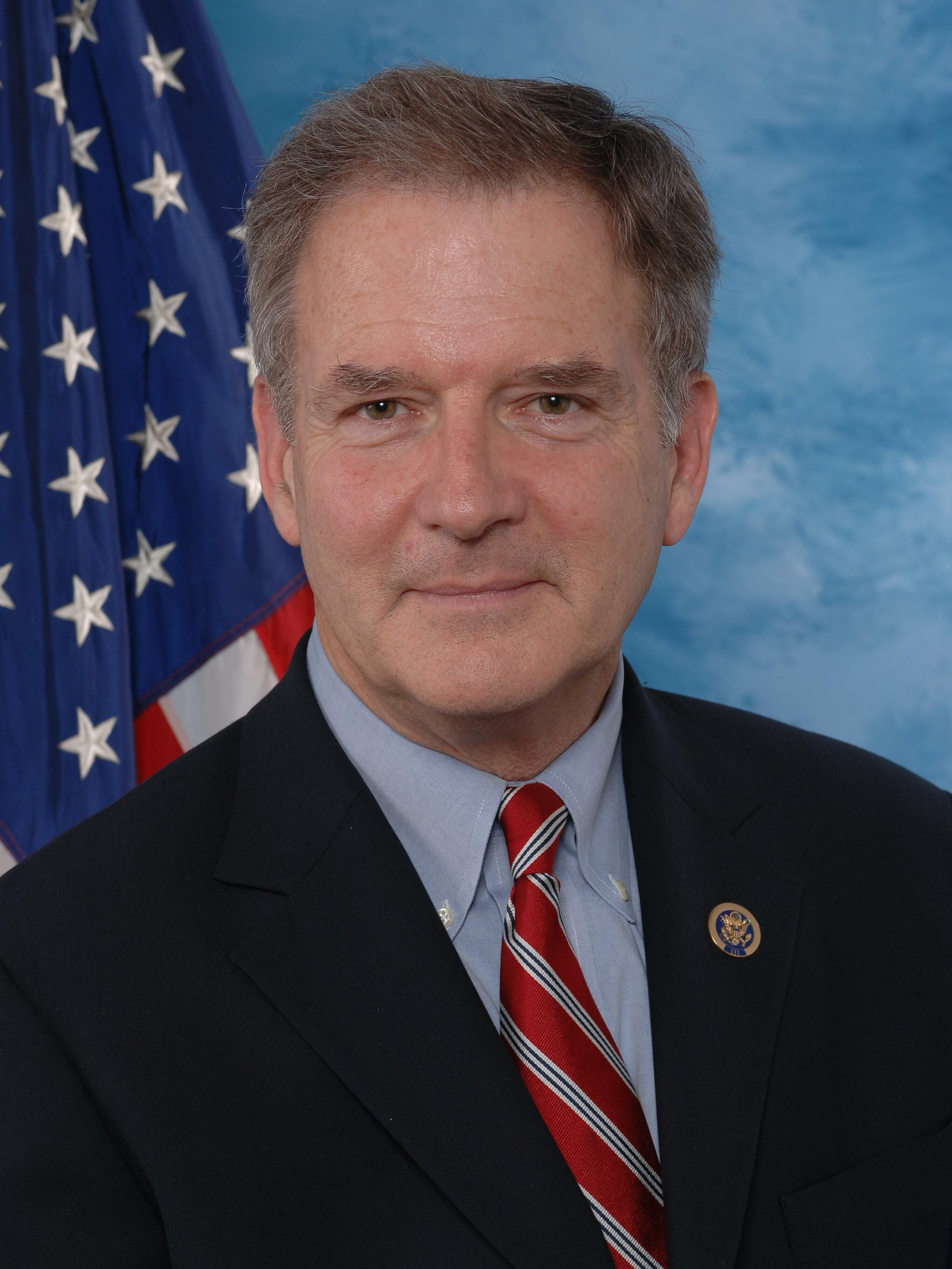

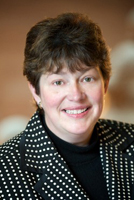
Nominee	Bill Owens	Doug Hoffman	Dede Scozzafava (withdrawn)
Party	Democratic	Conservative	Republican
Alliance	Working Families		Independence
Popular vote	73,137	69,553	8,582
Percentage	48.3%	46.0%	5.7%
U.S. Representative before election
John M. McHugh
Republican
Elected U.S. Representative
Bill Owens
Democratic

The 2009 special election for New York's 23rd congressional district was held on November 3, 2009, to select the successor to Republican John M. McHugh. McHugh was nominated to become United States Secretary of the Army on June 2, 2009, and resigned as representative of New York's 23rd congressional district on September 21, 2009, after being confirmed by the Senate.

The Democratic Party and the Working Families Party nominated businessman and attorney Bill Owens, and the Conservative Party of New York nominated businessman and accountant Doug Hoffman. The Republican Party and Independence Party nominated State Assembly member Dede Scozzafava, who withdrew from the race three days before the election and endorsed Owens. On Election Day, Owens defeated Hoffman.

The 2009 special election received significant national attention, and was alternately described as "a referendum on President Barack Obama" and "a fight over the identity of the Republican Party." The race was also noteworthy due to the Tea Party movement influence on its outcome, and for its impact on same-sex marriage legislation in New York.

== Background ==
New York's 23rd congressional district had historically been one of the most Republican districts in the United States. The district's seat had been in Republican hands since 1873. The far northern portion of the district—including the largest city, Watertown—had not been represented by a Democrat since the 1850s. The last non-Republican to represent some parts of the district had been a Whig. McHugh was first elected in 1992, and was reelected eight times with over 60% of the vote, including running unopposed in 2002.

Although McHugh was consistently elected with over 60% of the vote, in recent years the district had been more competitive in United States presidential elections. George W. Bush narrowly carried the district in 2004 against John Kerry, 51% to 47%. However, Gore narrowly defeated Bush in what was then the 24th district in 2000, repeating Bill Clinton's victory there in 1996. Barack Obama defeated John McCain in the district 52% to 47% in 2008.

Democrats had also recently done well in the district at the state level. In a 2008 special election for New York's 48th State Senate district (which is coextensive with the northwestern portion of the 23rd congressional district and includes Watertown), Democratic Assemblyman Darrel Aubertine defeated heavily favored Republican Assemblyman Will Barclay. Aubertine became the first Democrat to represent what is now the 48th Senate district in over a century.

On September 29, 2009, New York Governor David Paterson issued a proclamation setting the special election to fill the vacancy for November 3, 2009, to coincide with the 2009 general election. New York law does not provide for a primary election in cases of a special election for a vacant House seat. Instead, each party's nominee is chosen by that party's county leaders within the district.

== Candidates ==
=== Republican Party ===
Seven Republicans announced their intentions to run. Three other Republicans were considered potential candidates, but declined to run.

Assemblymember Dede Scozzafava was designated as the Republican nominee. On October 31, 2009, Scozzafava suspended her campaign and, on November 1, 2009, endorsed the Democratic candidate for the seat.

=== Democratic Party ===
State Senator Darrel Aubertine, who represents most of the northern portion of the congressional district, was the most widely rumored potential Democratic candidate, but he declined. State Senator David Valesky, who represents most of the southern portion of the congressional district, initially said he was interested in running, but later decided against it. Also declining to run was assemblywoman Addie Jenne Russell, whose district includes Watertown.

The chair of the New York Democratic Party stated that Scozzafava's husband had spoken with key local Democrats about the possibility of her switching to the Democratic Party before running for the seat.

The party eventually selected Bill Owens, a military veteran and attorney from Plattsburgh.

=== Conservative Party ===
The Conservative Party chose Doug Hoffman as its nominee after three other potential candidates said they would support him, even though Hoffman did not live in the district. The Conservative Party declined to support the Republican Party's nomination of pro-choice, pro-same-sex-marriage, pro-union Assemblymember Dede Scozzafava, who Conservative Party Chairman Mike Long described as a "nice lady who is too liberal."

Hoffman had previously sought the Republican nomination. In July, when Scozzafava was nominated instead, Hoffman offered to help her. His email to her read: "Hi Dede, Congratulations and the best of luck in your candidacy. Let me know if there is anything I can do to help. Doug." Shortly thereafter, however, he contacted Conservative Party leaders, seeking support for his own candidacy. One Republican leader said that Hoffman, while seeking the Republican nomination, had "repeatedly" pledged to support the nominee.

=== Other parties ===
The chairman of the Independence Party of New York announced that the party would have cross-endorsed Aubertine had he run, but with his decision not to run, the party instead backed Scozzafava. After she suspended her campaign, the state chairman of the party endorsed Bill Owens, though several local chairmen instead endorsed Hoffman. Scozzafava remained on the ballot on the Independence Party line (as well as the Republican line).

The Working Families Party backed Owens. Under New York's fusion rule, Owens's votes on the Democratic line and on the Working Families line were combined into a single total.

== Campaign ==
The race drew significant national attention because of the relatively large amount of support for a third-party candidate from the national conservative base. The Susan B. Anthony List embarked on a $100,000 independent expenditure campaign for Hoffman. Many notable Republicans, including former Vice Presidential nominee Sarah Palin, Republican Governor Tim Pawlenty of Minnesota and former U.S. Senator Fred Thompson, endorsed Hoffman rather than the Republican candidate because they deemed Scozzafava insufficiently conservative and ideologically indistinguishable from the Democrat. Scozzafava also drew strong opposition from the Tea Party movement, with national Tea Party leader Michael Johns saying that his opposition to Scozzafava "was the first time in my 25-year political and policy career that I ever opposed a Republican candidate."

The Hoffman campaign ran television advertisements depicting Scozzafava and Owens as "two peas in a liberal pod." Hoffman indicated support for tax cuts, and support for criminalization of abortion, as well as opposition to same-sex marriage, the Obama health reform proposal, card-check legislation, and cap-and-trade legislation.

Scozzafava's record in the New York State Assembly included votes in favor of same-sex marriage, and she had also received an award from a Planned Parenthood affiliate in 2008. Scozzafava's political positions included support for "card check" legislation, support for federal funding for abortion, support for President Obama's 2009 stimulus package, and a refusal to rule out support for health care reform that includes a "public option." While Bill Owens did not favor public funding for abortion, he did support President Obama's 2009 stimulus package and "card check" legislation.

An October 1, 2009, poll by the Siena Research Institute put Hoffman in third place with 16% support, behind Scozzafava with 35% and Owens with 28%. However, a Siena poll released two weeks later indicated that Owens led Scozzafava by four percentage points and Hoffman by 10%. Polls taken a few days before the election showed Scozzafava's support collapsing; an October 31 poll showed Scozzafava trailing both Hoffman and Owens by 15% and 16%, respectively.

Scozzafava suspended her campaign on October 31. In response to the Scozzafava withdrawal, the Republican National Committee (RNC), which had strongly backed Scozzafava's candidacy, issued a statement applauding her decision and announcing it was now supporting Hoffman. National Democrats immediately began a "vigorous effort" to convince Scozzafava to endorse Owens. On November 1, Scozzafava endorsed Democratic nominee Owens.

Former Speaker of the House Newt Gingrich, while having initially supported the GOP nominee, remarked that he was "deeply upset" about her endorsement of Owens after Scozzafava's withdrawal from the race. RNC Chairman Michael S. Steele questioned party leaders in upstate New York for using a committee process to select a congressional candidate. "Maybe you should have a primary the next time instead of having 11 guys in a room sit around and select your nominee," said Steele. The New York Republican Party issued a statement saying Scozzafava's endorsement was a "betrayal" of the party and said "In contacting Scozzafava, the Obama White House has once again played its Chicago-style politics here in New York."

On November 2, one day before the election, Siena released the results of a new poll showing Hoffman leading Owens 41% to 36%. Vice President Joe Biden appeared with Owens at a campaign rally in Watertown on November 3, while former U.S. Senator and 2008 presidential candidate Fred Thompson appeared with Hoffman.

On Election Day, police were called to at least two polling sites in St. Lawrence County following "overzealous electioneering" by supporters of Hoffman. Later, Hoffman accused the Democratic Party of "bringing in ACORN" and trying to "steal this election away from the 23rd district", asserting that a campaign volunteer's tires had been slashed. Anton Troianovski of The Wall Street Journal later quoted Captain Michael Branch of the Plattsburgh City Police Department as saying "This was not a tire slashing—this was some guy who drove over a bottle and cut his tire."

=== Polling ===
Source	Date	Dede Scozzafava	Bill Owens	Doug Hoffman
Siena Research Institute	November 2, 2009	6%	36%	41%
Public Policy Polling	November 1, 2009	13%	34%	51%
Siena Research Institute	October 26–28, 2009	20%	36%	35%
Research 2000	October 26–28, 2009	21%	33%	32%
Neighborhood Research^{§}	October 25–26, 2009	14%	29%	34%
Basswood Research^{‡}	October 24–25, 2009	20%	27%	31%
Research 2000	October 19–21, 2009	30%	35%	23%
Siena Research Institute	October 11–13, 2009	29%	33%	23%
Siena Research Institute	September 29, 2009	35%	28%	16%
Basswood Research^{‡}	September 17, 2009	20%	17%	17%
McLaughlin & Associates^{†}	September 9, 2009	30%	20%	19%

† Poll commissioned by Conservative Party candidate Doug Hoffman
‡ Poll commissioned by the Club for Growth, which endorses Doug Hoffman
§ Poll commissioned by the Minuteman PAC, which endorses Doug Hoffman

=== Endorsements ===
==== Dede Scozzafava ====
Changes after withdrawal
No known change	Endorsed Owens	Endorsed Hoffman
Oswego County ATV Club	New York State United Teachers	House Minority Leader John Boehner
The Wish List	Watertown Daily Times	Michael Steele, chairman of the Republican National Committee
State Senator Betty Little		Former Speaker of the House Newt Gingrich
Assemblywomen Teresa Sayward		Representative Jeb Hensarling, former Republican Study Committee Chair
Assemblywoman Janet Duprey		New York State Young Republicans
Assemblyman Jim Tedisco, former assembly minority leader		Assemblyman Will Barclay
Assemblyman Robert Oaks		NRA Political Victory Fund
John Faso, former assembly minority leader, 2002 comptroller candidate and 2006 gubernatorial candidate		Assemblyman David Townsend
Daily Kos founder, Markos Moulitsas		Jeffrey Graham, mayor of Watertown
US Senator Susan Collins		
Representative Ginny Brown-Waite		
Former Representative Tom Reynolds, former chairman of the National Republican Congressional Committee		
Representative Peter King		

==== Bill Owens ====
Endorsements
- President Barack Obama
- Former President Bill Clinton
- Vice President Joe Biden
- US Senator Chuck Schumer
- US Senator Kirsten Gillibrand
- Governor David Paterson
- Attorney General Andrew Cuomo
- State Senator Darrel Aubertine
- State Senator David Valesky
- Working Families Party
- Syracuse Post-Standard
- 1199 SEIU United Healthcare Workers East
- Communications Workers of America
- MoveOn.org
- AFL–CIO (had endorsed Scozzafava)
- New York State United Teachers (had endorsed Scozzafava)
- Frank MacKay, chairman of the Independence Party of New York (had endorsed Scozzafava)
- Watertown Daily Times (had endorsed Scozzafava)
- Dede Scozzafava

==== Doug Hoffman ====
Endorsements
- Concerned Women Political Action Committee
- Police Benevolent Association of the New York State Troopers
- Former US Senator Fred Thompson
- Club for Growth
- The Susan B. Anthony List
- American Conservative Union
- Citizens for the Republic PAC
- Former Republican presidential candidate Gary Bauer
- New York State Right to Life Political Action Committee
- Columnist Michelle Malkin
- Columnist Bill Kristol
- Talk radio host Mark Levin
- Talk radio host Rush Limbaugh
- Talk radio host Sean Hannity
- Talk radio host Glenn Beck
- Talk radio host Hugh Hewitt
- Talk radio host Michael Medved
- Talk radio host Laura Ingraham
- Former House Majority Leader Dick Armey
- Eagle Forum
- Representative Michele Bachmann
- Former Governor of Alaska Sarah Palin
- Former US Senator Rick Santorum
- FRC Action, the Family Research Council's political action committee
- Former Republican presidential candidate Steve Forbes
- James Dobson
- Representative John Linder, former chairman of the National Republican Congressional Committee
- New York Post
- Minuteman PAC
- Representative Dana Rohrabacher
- Representative Tom Cole, former chairman of the National Republican Congressional Committee
- America's Independent Party
- GING-PAC
- National Organization for Marriage
- Representative Todd Akin
- Singer-songwriter John Rich
- Representative Steve King
- Representative Jeff Flake
- Gun Owners of America
- Life and Liberty PAC
- Catholic Families for America
- Publisher Alfred S. Regnery
- Conservative writer Richard Viguerie
- Governor of Texas Rick Perry
- Representative Mary Fallin
- Representative Paul Broun
- Representative John C. Fleming
- Representative John Shadegg
- Former Governor of New York and First Lady of New York George Pataki and Libby Pataki
- Captain Scott O'Grady, United States Air Force (retired)
- Mayor of Plattsburgh Donald Kasprzak (originally endorsed Scozzafava)
- Representative Darrell Issa (originally endorsed Scozzafava)
- Representative Pete Sessions, chairman of the NRCC (originally endorsed Scozzafava)
- Representative Eric Cantor, House Minority Whip
- Representative John Boehner, House Minority Leader (originally endorsed Scozzafava)
- Michael Steele, Chairman of the Republican National Committee
- Former Governor of Arkansas Mike Huckabee
- Former Speaker of the House Newt Gingrich (originally endorsed Scozzafava)
- Former Representative and 2010 Gubernatorial Candidate Rick Lazio
- New York State Young Republicans
- Assembly Minority Leader Brian Kolb
- Conservative activist Michael Johns
- Former Governor of Colorado Bill Owens

== Results ==
2009 NY-23 special congressional election
Party	Candidate	Votes	%	±%
Democratic	Bill Owens	66,548		
Working Families	Bill Owens	6,589		
Total	Bill Owens	73,137	48.3	+14.0
Conservative	Doug Hoffman	69,553	46.0	
Republican	Dede Scozzafava	7,260		
Independence	Dede Scozzafava	1,322		
Total	Dede Scozzafava	8,582	5.7	−59.6
Majority		3,584	2.4	−28.2
Turnout		151,272		−24.0
Democratic gain from Republican		Swing	13.6	

By county

County	Bill Owens Democratic		Doug Hoffman Conservative		Dede Scozzafava Republican		Write-in		Margin		Total votes
County	#	%	#	%	#	%	#	%	#	%	Total votes
Clinton	11,364	56.7%	7,863	39.2%	815	4.1%	3	0.01%	3,501	17.5%	20,045
Essex (part)	3,963	50.3%	3,355	42.6%	561	7.1%	1	0.01%	608	7.7%	7,880
Franklin	5,319	52.1%	4,564	44.7%	333	3.3%	3	0.01%	755	7.4%	10,219
Fulton (part)	2,069	37.5%	2,707	49.0%	743	13.5%	0	0.0%	-638	-11.5%	5,519
Hamilton	948	36.6%	1,269	49.1%	370	14.3%	0	0.0%	-321	-12.5%	2,587
Jefferson	10,902	46.0%	11,354	47.9%	1,414	6.0%	17	0.1%	-452	-1.9%	23,687
Lewis	2,934	42.3%	3,530	50.9%	460	6.6%	7	0.1%	-596	-8.6%	6,931
Madison	8,290	45.6%	9,155	50.4%	724	4.0%	7	0.01%	-865	-4.8%	18,176
Oneida (part)	2,243	37.8%	3,225	54.4%	459	7.7%	2	0.01%	-982	-16.6%	5,929
Oswego	11,552	44.4%	13,300	51.1%	1,158	4.4%	34	0.1%	-1,748	-6.7%	26,044
St. Lawrence	13,553	55.7%	9,231	37.9%	1,545	6.3%	20	0.1%	4,322	17.8%	24,349
Totals	73,137	48.3%	69,553	46.0%	8,582	5.7%	94	0.1%	3,584	2.3%	151,366

== Analysis and aftermath ==
On Election Day, Owens appeared to defeat Hoffman, with the margin of defeat initially reported as 49% to 45%. Although Hoffman initially conceded, an initial re-canvass resulted in a Hoffman gain of approximately 2,000 votes before military and absentee ballots were further factored in. Poll inspectors reported Mr. Hoffman had inadvertently received zero votes in four districts.

With absentee ballots having yet to be tallied, the results of the election could not be officially certified by the State of New York, though Owens was sworn in based upon unofficial results. Owens was seated in time to vote "yea" on the Affordable Health Care for America Act on November 7, 2009.

Hoffman withdrew his concession on November 17, 2009. On November 18, in a letter posted on his campaign website, Hoffman declared that "ACORN, the unions and Democratic Party ... tampered with the ballots of voters in NY-23." Jerry O. Eaton, Jefferson County Republican elections commissioner, called Hoffman's assertion "absolutely false". On November 19, the Gouverneur Times alleged that a computer virus had "tainted" results and "cast doubt on the accuracy of the counts retrieved from any of the machines." John Conklin, director of public information for the NY State Board of Elections, stated that "the article ... unfortunately quoted a single word from a commissioner who mischaracterized the issue in question." Hoffman later retracted his accusations.

With the tallying of absentee ballots near completion, on November 20, 2009, Owens' lead over Hoffman surpassed the total number of absentee ballots left, making it mathematically impossible for Hoffman to win. On November 24, Hoffman ended his campaign, stating, "it is with a heavy heart that we declare this election over. We will formally end this election and not ask for a recount." The final election results showed that Owens prevailed by a margin of 48% to 46%.

Owens was later re-elected to Congress in 2010 and 2012. A week after the 2009 election, Scozzafava was stripped of her Republican leadership position in the State Assembly. After Scozzafava's unsuccessful congressional campaign, she acknowledged that her name had begun being used as a verb: "scozzafavaed." Commentator Chris Good described the term as follows: "The gist, basically, is that if you're a moderate Republican and the conservative wing of the GOP sets out to get you, and does, you got Scozzafavaed." In April 2010, Scozzafava announced that she would not run for re-election to the New York State Assembly in November 2010. In January 2011, Scozzafava was appointed New York Deputy Secretary of State for Local Government by Democratic Governor Andrew M. Cuomo.

=== Analysis ===
While some observers called the race "a referendum on President Barack Obama" and "a fight over the identity of the Republican Party", others saw "a victory for populist conservatism". One commentator stated that "Hoffman's third-party candidacy is striking for how much it has galvanized the Republican Party's base." According to one commentator, "[t]ea party conservatives see the GOP loss as a victory for conservativism over mere political party loyalty. They’re describing the defeat as a warning shot fired in defense of principle." According to Marilyn Musgrave of Susan B. Anthony List, "Republican party leaders in Washington should take the message of the campaign and the election seriously, that the Party base should not be taken for granted." Elected officials and observers opined that Scozzafava's showing in the congressional race affected the New York State Senate's December 2, 2009, vote against same-sex marriage legislation.
