= Ambrose W. Clark =

American politician

Ambrose William Clark
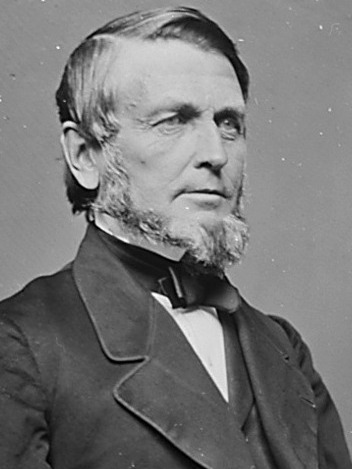

Member of the U.S. House of Representatives from New York
- In office March 4, 1861 – March 4, 1865
- Preceded by: Charles B. Hoard
- Succeeded by: Addison H. Laflin
- Constituency: 23rd district (1861–1863); 20th district (1863–1865)

Personal details
- Born: February 19, 1810 Cooperstown, New York, U.S.
- Died: October 13, 1887 (aged 77) Watertown, New York, U.S.
- Resting place: Brookside Cemetery, Watertown, New York, U.S.
- Party: Republican

Ambrose Williams Clark (February 19, 1810 – October 13, 1887) was a U.S. representative from New York, serving 1861–1865.

== Biography ==
Born near Cooperstown, New York, Clark attended the public schools, was trained as a printer, and became active in the newspaper business as an advocate of Whig Party politics. He was publisher of the Otsego Journal from 1831 to 1836, the Northern Journal in Lewis County from 1836 to 1844, and the Northern New York Journal in Watertown from 1844 to 1860.

Clark became a Republican when the party was founded in the mid-1850s. In 1859 and 1860 he served as Watertown's Town Supervisor and a member of the Jefferson County Board of Supervisors.

He was elected as a Republican to the Thirty-seventh and Thirty-eighth Congresses (March 4, 1861 – March 4, 1865).

He was appointed consul at Valparaíso, Chile by President Lincoln and served from 1865 to 1869. He acted as Chargé d'affaires in Chile in the absence of the Minister in 1869.

== Death and burial ==
Clark died in Watertown, New York on October 13, 1887. He was interred in Watertown's Brookside Cemetery.

== Family ==
Clark's daughter Paulina Sabina was the wife of George A. Bagley.

U.S. House of Representatives
Preceded by Charles B. Hoard	Member of the U.S. House of Representatives from New York's 23rd congressional district 1861–1863	Succeeded by Thomas Treadwell Davis
Preceded by Roscoe Conkling	Member of the U.S. House of Representatives from New York's 20th congressional district 1863–1865	Succeeded by Addison H. Laflin
