= Bill Owens (New York politician) =

American politician (born 1949)

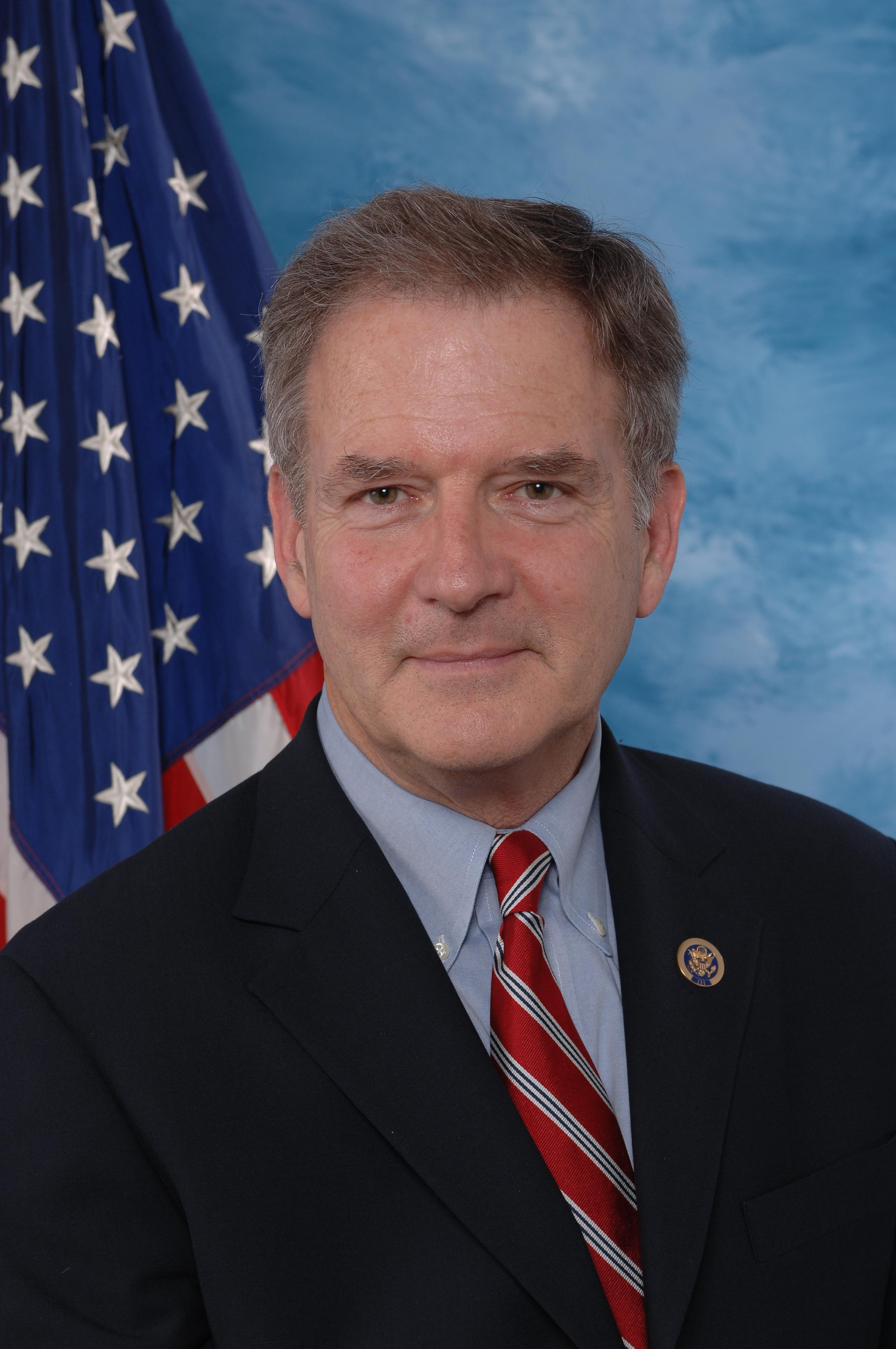
- Official portrait, 2010

Member of the U.S. House of Representatives from New York
- In office November 3, 2009 – January 3, 2015 (Note: Owens's official service begins on the date of the special election, while he was not sworn in until November 6, 2009.)
- Preceded by: John M. McHugh
- Succeeded by: Elise Stefanik
- Constituency: 23rd district (2009–2013); 21st district (2013–2015)

Personal details
- Born: William Lewis Owens; January 20, 1949 (age 77) New York City, New York, U.S.
- Party: Independent (before 2009); Democratic (2009–present)
- Spouse: Jane Owens
- Children: 3
- Education: Manhattan College (BBA); Fordham University (JD)

Military service
- Allegiance: United States
- Branch/service: United States Air Force
- Years of service: 1975–1979 (active); 1979–1982 (reserve)
- Rank: Captain
- Unit: United States Air Force Reserve

William Lewis Owens (born January 20, 1949) is an American attorney and former U.S. representative from New York, an office he held from 2009 to 2015. He is a member of the Democratic Party and currently serves on the advisory board of the Canadian American Business Council. The district he represented, the state's largest and most rural, includes most of the North Country, as well as the northern suburbs of Syracuse.

== Early life and education ==
Born in Brooklyn to Lewis Owens and Alice Stanton Owens, Owens was raised in Mineola, New York. After graduating from Chaminade High School, where he was a classmate of television host and conservative political commentator Bill O'Reilly, Owens earned a Bachelor of Business Administration from Manhattan College in 1971 and a Juris Doctor from the Fordham University School of Law in 1974.

== Career ==
=== Military service ===
After graduating from high school, he enlisted in the U.S. Air Force and was stationed at Plattsburgh Air Force Base. He returned to the North Country and has lived there for over 30 years after serving as a United States Air Force captain.

=== Legal work ===
Before coming to Congress, Owens was a managing partner at Stafford, Owens, Piller, Murnane & Trombley, where he specialized in business law, international law, and estate and tax law. He is also an adjunct professor in business law at State University of New York at Plattsburgh. In 2004, he was appointed by Governor George Pataki to the College Council at that university. He served as the host for Business Affairs on WCFE-TV, a PBS television station in Plattsburgh. According to financial disclosure forms filed when he ran for Congress, Owens made $751,000 in 2008, mostly from his law practice.

Owens also became a Member of the board of Arrow Bank Financial Corporation, and its subsidiary Glens Falls National Bank in 2015. He served as Lead Director for several years and Chairman of the Board for approximately 14 months, ending his term on May 5, 2024, when he reached the mandatory retirement age.

When the Plattsburgh Air Force Base closed in 1995, Owens helped create and worked for the Plattsburgh Airbase Redevelopment Corporation (formerly the Plattsburgh Inter-municipal Development Council), which recruited private companies to reuse the space. The base is now home to companies such as Bombardier Inc., a passenger railway car maker. Plattsburgh Airbase Redevelopment Corporation attests that more than 2,000 jobs were created at the site since the military left.

== United States Representatives (2009-2015) ==
=== Elections ===
==== 2009 ====
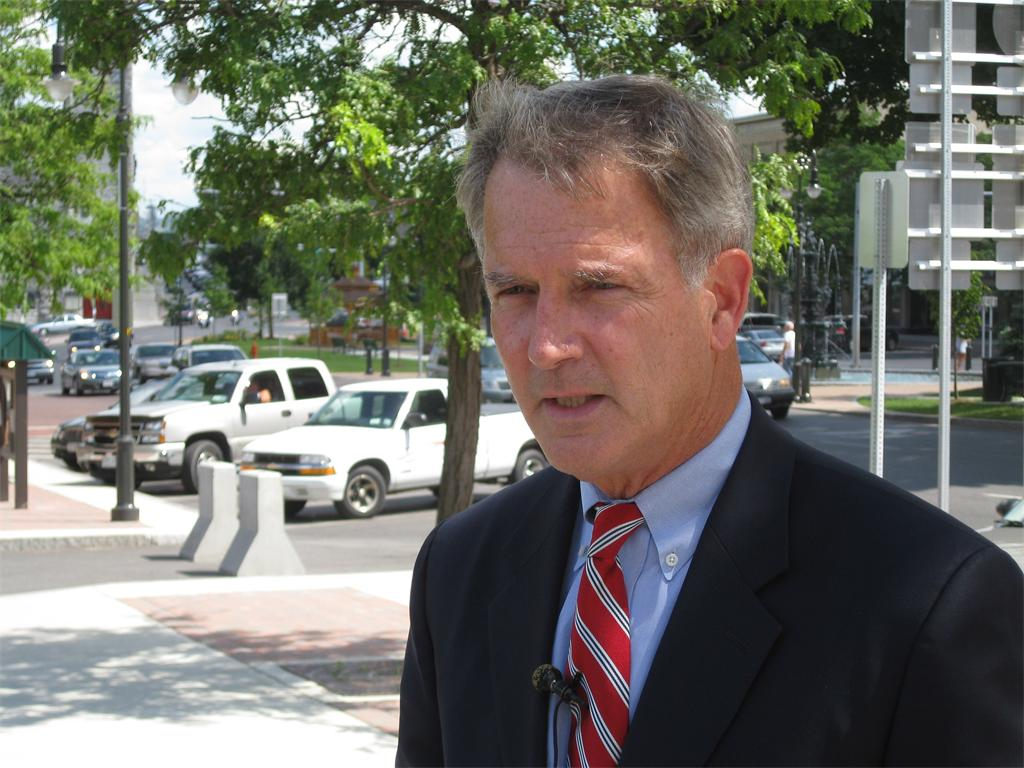
Owens at West Point

On August 10, 2009, the Democratic Party of New York's 23rd congressional district chose Owens to run in a special election to fill the House seat vacated by the incumbent Republican John McHugh, who had resigned to take a post as the Secretary of the Army. Because he was a registered independent at the time, Owens had to obtain the signatures of all 11 Democratic county chairs in the district to allow him to run as a Democrat.

Originally, Owens faced Republican Assemblywoman Dede Scozzafava and Doug Hoffman, an accountant from Lake Placid who was running as a third party candidate on the single ballot line of the Conservative Party of New York after failing to also get the Republican Party nomination. “The race,” wrote Valerie Bauman of the Associated Press, “received national attention, with some calling it a referendum on Obama and others saying it could help Republicans focus their message to attract more people to the party.” Bauman said that “Despite the fervor that surrounded Hoffman in the final week of the campaign, Owens managed to appeal to the voters with his talk of job creation and the need for more federal support for Fort Drum (an army base in the district) and farmers.” Scozzafava was a social liberal, and high-profile conservatives such as Rush Limbaugh, Sarah Palin, and Michelle Malkin threw their support behind Hoffman, who enjoyed Tea Party support. Under pressure from conservative elements in her party, who saw “Doug Hoffman as the man who would save them,” according to the San Francisco Chronicle, Scozzafava dropped out of the race on October 31, the weekend before the election. Hoffman then became Owens's sole opponent. The Watertown Daily Times, which had originally endorsed Scozzafava, switched its endorsement to Owens on November 1. Later on November 1, Scozzafava endorsed Owens. In the special election, Owens won 48% of the vote to 46% for Hoffman and 6% for Scozzafava. Owens took his seat on November 6, 2009. He became the first Democrat to represent what was, in 2009, the 23rd since 1873.

==== 2010 ====
Owens almost immediately announced that he would run for reelection to a full term in 2010. He campaigned largely on “creating jobs throughout his district, attracting foreign manufacturers, taking care of veterans, and ensuring that Fort Drum (an Army installation located in the district) is preserved.” Owens won his re-election bid with a second consecutive minority plurality of 47.5% of the vote against Republican and Independence nominee Matt Doheny and Conservative nominee Doug Hoffman, becoming the first Democrat to win a full term in the North Country district in 138 years.

The election was one of the ten closest Congressional races that year.

==== 2012 ====
Owens ran for reelection in 2012 in the renumbered 21st District. He faced a rematch against Doheny and was re-elected to a third term, by 4,985 votes.

=== Tenure ===
During his campaign, Owens said he would focus on creating jobs throughout his district, attracting foreign manufacturers, taking care of veterans, and ensuring that Fort Drum is preserved. He has called for deeper federal budget cuts (including 3% cuts across the board for federal agencies), co-sponsored the Budget Process Improvement Act of 2011, and said that the Bush-era tax cuts need to be allowed to expire for people earning over $500,000. Owens is the second thriftiest member of Congress, with staff expenses of $713,969.

Owens has consistently voted for legislation to build the controversial Keystone Pipeline to carry tar sand oil across the United States from Canada for export to foreign nations.

As a congressman, Owens first authored piece of legislation was the Rural Jobs Tax Credit Act, a bill that, if passed, would create a 15% tax incentive in 2010 for businesses that hire or expand their payroll in rural areas, and a 10% tax incentive for firms that do the same in 2011.

On December 14, 2011, Marc Heller reported that Sen. Claire McCaskill had accused Owens and other members of the House Armed Services Committee “of loading up an annual defense bill with pork-barrel projects despite a congressional ban on home-state 'earmarks.'” Owens's earmarks “included construction at Fort Drum and $500,000 intended for the Fort Drum Regional Health Planning Organization.”

On January 14, 2014, Owens announced he would not seek re-election. On November 4, he was succeeded by Republican Elise Stefanik.

Gay Marriage

In August 2009, Owens stated that he supported civil unions and believed marriage should be legally recognized as one man one woman. Owens opposes any federal action on marriage, which he called a "states rights issue". In July 2011, after the New York State legislature passed a bill recognizing same-sex marriage in New York, Owens became a co-sponsor of the Respect for Marriage Act, which would repeal the federal Defense of Marriage Act.

Labor

He supports the Employee Free Choice Act.

Health Care

Owens voted for the Affordable Health Care for America Act on November 7, 2009. He voted against the Stupak Amendment which proposed to restrict abortion funding in the federal health insurance exchanges. He voted for the Patient Protection and Affordable Care Act on March 21, 2010, and for the Health Care and Education Reconciliation Act of 2010 to incorporate certain agreed-upon changes with the Senate.

Internet policy

In 2011, Rep. Owens became a co-sponsor of Bill H.R.3261 otherwise known as the Stop Online Piracy Act.

GMO crops

Owens is a member of the House Committee on Agriculture and voted for the Farmer Assurance Provision. Owens says that he is "still doing the fact-finding" when it comes to Monsanto and GMO crops. "I have farmers who are telling me it's a great thing. I have people telling me that it's the worst thing in the world."

The Monsanto Citizenship Fund from Monsanto donated $1,500 on June 24, 2013 to Owens' 2014 campaign.

=== Committee assignments ===
- Committee on Appropriations
  - Subcommittee on Defense
  - Subcommittee on Homeland Security

Source: House Appropriations Committee

=== Caucus memberships ===
- Congressional Biomass Caucus
- Congressional Center Aisle Caucus
- Congressional Northern Border Caucus (Co-Chair)
- International Conservation Caucus
- Sportsmen's Caucus
- Congressional Cement Caucus

== Personal life ==
Owens and his wife Jane have three children and six grandchildren. Jane was an early childhood education teacher and is currently the Director of Education and Outreach for Mountain Lake PBS in Plattsburgh. He is a Roman Catholic.

U.S. House of Representatives
Preceded by John M. McHugh	Member of the U.S. House of Representatives from New York's 23rd congressional district 2009–2013	Succeeded by Tom Reed
Preceded by Paul Tonko	Member of the U.S. House of Representatives from New York's 21st congressional district 2013–2015	Succeeded by Elise Stefanik
U.S. order of precedence (ceremonial)
Preceded by Michael Forbes as Former U.S. Representative	Order of precedence of the United States as Former U.S. Representative	Succeeded by Chris Gibson as Former U.S. Representative
