= New York's 23rd congressional district =

U.S. House district for New York

Coordinates: 42°20′39″N 77°50′45″W

- Interactive map of district boundaries since January 3, 2025
- Representative: Nick Langworthy; R–Pendleton
- Distribution: 52.44% rural; 47.56% urban
- Population (2025): 763,548
- Median household income: $78,436
- Ethnicity: 88.2% White; 3.8% Two or more races; 3.6% Hispanic; 2.1% Black; 1.2% Asian; 0.8% Native American; 0.3% other
- Cook PVI: R+10

New York's 23rd congressional district is located in Upstate New York, and covers part of Buffalo's Northtowns, all of the Southtowns, and much of the Southern Tier. The district includes the southern part of Keuka Lake and a small portion of the southern end of Seneca Lake, two of the eleven Finger Lakes.

== Geography and demographics ==
The district comprises five entire counties: Chemung County, Cattaraugus, Chautauqua, and Tioga Counties, along with parts of Schuyler, Steuben, Erie and Niagara Counties. The largest cities in the district are Jamestown, and Elmira.

== Recent election history ==
2018: Democrat Tracy Mitrano challenged Republican incumbent Tom Reed. Reed won reelection with an 8.4% margin, his smallest victory margin since his first election in 2012.

2020: Reed and Mitrano faced off again, with Reed securing a victory with a 16.6% margin.

On March 21, 2021, in light of recent sexual harassment allegations, Reed announced that he would not be seeking reelection in 2022. Reed resigned on May 10, 2022, leaving the seat vacant. A special election was held on August 23, which was won by Republican Joe Sempolinski, who opted not to run for a full term in the regularly scheduled 2022 election. Republican Nick Langworthy won the seat in the general election.

== Recent election results from statewide races ==
Year	Office	Results
2008	President	McCain 53% - 45%
2012	President	Romney 56% - 44%
2016	President	Trump 60% - 35%
2016	Senate	Schumer 55% - 43%
2018	Senate	Farley 53% - 47%
2018	Governor	Molinaro 60% - 34%
2018	Attorney General	Wofford 61% - 36%
2020	President	Trump 58% - 40%
2022	Senate	Pinion 61% - 39%
2022	Governor	Zeldin 64% - 36%
2022	Attorney General	Henry 64% - 36%
2022	Comptroller	Rodríguez 60% - 40%
2024	President	Trump 60% - 39%
2024	Senate	Sapraicone 58% - 42%

== History ==
Due to reapportionment, various New York geographical districts have been numbered "23" over the years, including areas in New York City and various parts of upstate New York.

1913–1919
Parts of Manhattan
1919–1969
Parts of The Bronx
1969–1971
Parts of The Bronx, Manhattan
1971–1973
Parts of The Bronx
1973–1983
Parts of The Bronx, Westchester
1983–1993
All of Albany, Schenectady
Parts of Montgomery, Rensselaer
1993–2003
All of Chenango, Madison, Oneida, Otsego
Parts of Broome, Delaware, Herkimer, Montgomery, Schoharie
2003–2013
All of Clinton, Franklin, Hamilton, Jefferson, Lewis, Madison, Oswego, St. Lawrence
Parts of Essex, Fulton, Oneida
2013–2023
All of Allegany, Cattaraugus, Chautauqua, Chemung, Schuyler, Seneca, Steuben, Tompkins, Yates
Parts of Ontario, Tioga
2023-Present
All of Chautauqua, Allegany, Cattaraugus, Tioga
Parts of Erie, Schuyler, Steuben

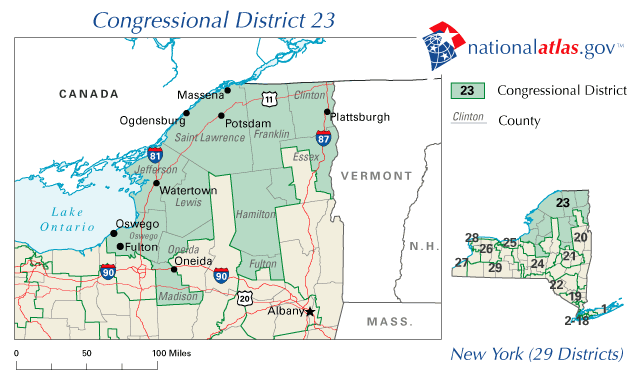
2003–2013

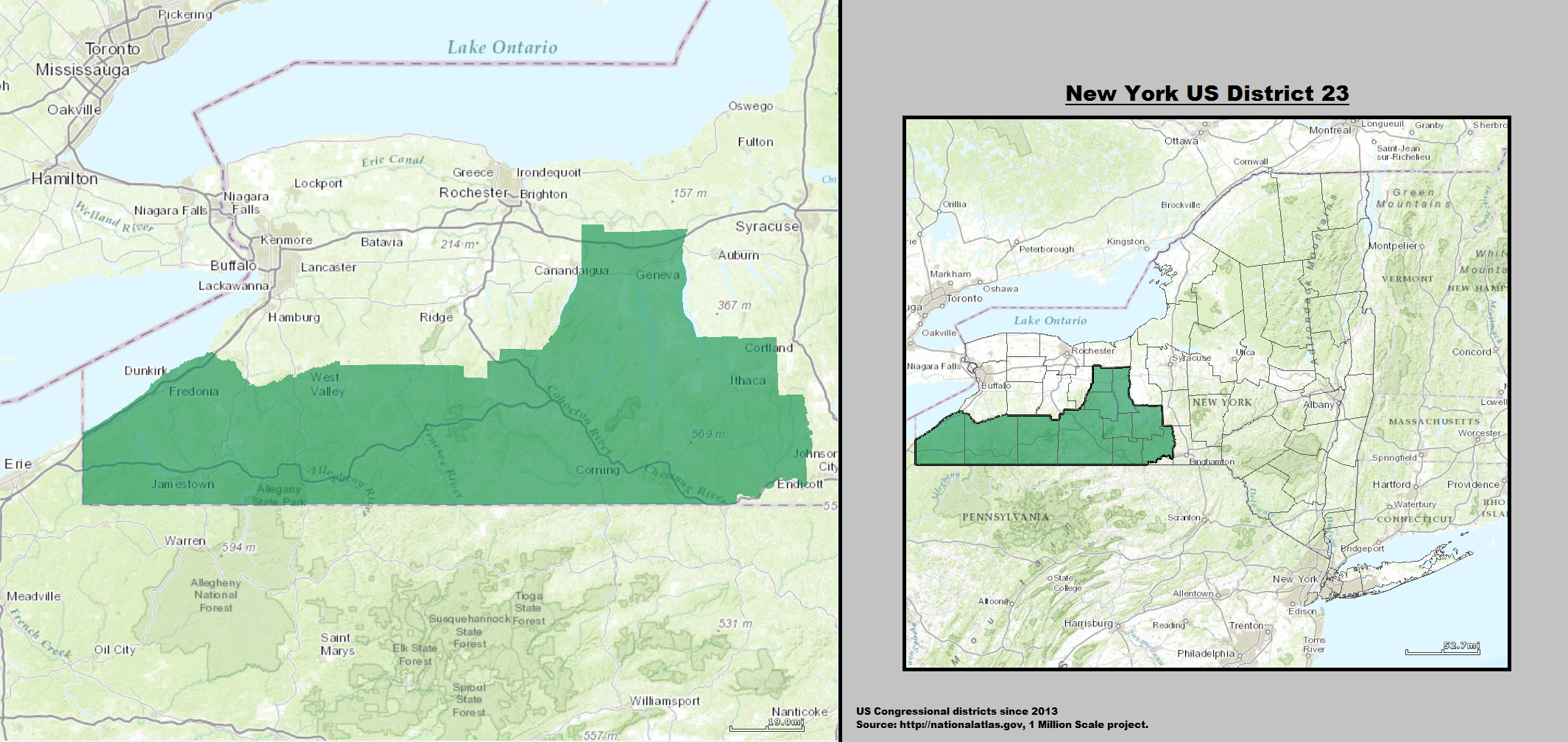
2013–2023

== Counties, towns, and municipalities ==
For the 119th and successive Congresses (based on the districts drawn following the New York Court of Appeals' December 2023 decision in Hoffman v New York State Ind. Redistricting. Commn.), the district contains all or portions of the following counties, towns, and municipalities.

Allegany County (29)

All 29 towns

Cattaraugus County (35)

All 35 towns and cities

Chautauqua County (29)

All 29 towns and cities

Chemung County (12)

All 12 towns and cities

Erie County (20)

Alden, Aurora, Boston, Brant, Clarence, Colden, Collins, Concord, Eden, Elma, Evans, Hamburg, Holland, Lancaster, Marilla, Newstead, North Collins, Orchard Park, Sardinia, Wales

Niagara County (4)

Lockport (city) (part; also 24th), Lockport (town) (part; also 24th; includes Rapids and South Lockport), Pendleton, Wheatfield (part; also 26th)

Schuyler County (4)

Catharine, Dix, Montour, Orange

Steuben County (27)

Addison, Bath, Bradford, Cameron, Campbell, Canisteo, Caton, Corning (city), Corning (town), Erwin, Fremont, Greenwood, Hartsville, Hornby, Hornell, Hornellsville, Howard, Jasper, Lindley, Rathbone, Thurston, Troupsburg, Tuscarora, Urbana, Wayne, West Union, Woodhull

Tioga County (9)

All nine towns

== List of members representing the district ==
=== 1823–1833: one seat ===
Member	Party	Years	Cong ress	Electoral history
District established March 4, 1823
Elisha Litchfield (Delhi)	Democratic-Republican (Note: Supported the Crawford faction in the 1824 United States presidential election)	March 4, 1823 – March 3, 1825	18th	Redistricted from the 19th district and re-elected in 1822. Retired.
Luther Badger (Jamesville)	Anti-Jacksonian	March 4, 1825 – March 3, 1827	19th	Elected in 1824. [data missing]
Jonas Earll Jr. (Onondaga)	Jacksonian	March 4, 1827 – March 3, 1831	20th 21st	Elected in 1826. Re-elected in 1828. [data missing]
Freeborn G. Jewett (Skaneateles)	Jacksonian	March 4, 1831 – March 3, 1833	22nd	Elected in 1830. Retired.

=== 1833–1843: two seats ===
From 1833 to 1843, two seats were apportioned, elected on a general ticket.

Years	Cong ress	Seat A			Seat B		
Years	Cong ress	Member	Party	Electoral history	Member	Party	Electoral history
March 4, 1833 – March 3, 1837	23rd 24th	William K. Fuller (Chittenango)	Jacksonian	Elected in 1832; Re-elected in 1834. [data missing]	William Taylor (Manlius)	Jacksonian	Elected in 1832; Re-elected in 1834. Re-elected in 1836. [data missing]
March 4, 1837 – March 3, 1839	25th	Bennet Bicknell (Morrisville)	Democratic	Elected in 1836. [data missing]	William Taylor (Manlius)	Democratic	Elected in 1832; Re-elected in 1834. Re-elected in 1836. [data missing]
March 4, 1839 – March 3, 1841	26th	Nehemiah H. Earll (Syracuse)	Democratic	Elected in 1838. Lost re-election.	Edward Rogers (Madison)	Democratic	Elected in 1838. [data missing]
March 4, 1841 – March 3, 1843	27th	Victory Birdseye (Pompey)	Whig	Elected in 1840. Retired.	A. Lawrence Foster (Morrisville)	Whig	Elected in 1840. [data missing]

=== 1843–present: one seat ===
Member	Party	Years	Cong ress	Electoral history	District location
Orville Robinson (Mexico)	Democratic	March 4, 1843 – March 3, 1845	28th	Elected in 1842. [data missing]	
William J. Hough (Cazenovia)	Democratic	March 4, 1845 – March 3, 1847	29th	Elected in 1844. [data missing]	
William Duer (Oswego)	Whig	March 4, 1847 – March 3, 1851	30th 31st	Elected in 1846. Re-elected in 1848. [data missing]	
Leander Babcock (Oswego)	Democratic	March 4, 1851 – March 3, 1853	32nd	Elected in 1850. [data missing]	
Caleb Lyon (Lyonsdale)	Independent	March 4, 1853 – March 3, 1855	33rd	Elected in 1852. [data missing]	
William A. Gilbert (Adams)	Opposition	March 4, 1855 – February 27, 1857	34th	Elected in 1854. Resigned.	
Vacant		February 27, 1857 – March 3, 1857	34th		
Charles B. Hoard (Watertown)	Republican	March 4, 1857 – March 3, 1861	35th 36th	Elected in 1856. Re-elected in 1858. [data missing]	
Ambrose W. Clark (Watertown)	Republican	March 4, 1861 – March 3, 1863	37th	Elected in 1860. Redistricted to the 20th district.	
Thomas Treadwell Davis (Syracuse)	Union	March 4, 1863 – March 3, 1865	38th 39th	Elected in 1862. Re-elected in 1864. [data missing]	
Thomas Treadwell Davis (Syracuse)	Republican	March 4, 1865 – March 3, 1867	38th 39th	Elected in 1862. Re-elected in 1864. [data missing]	
Dennis McCarthy (Syracuse)	Republican	March 4, 1867 – March 3, 1871	40th 41st	Elected in 1866. Re-elected in 1868. [data missing]	
R. Holland Duell (Cortland)	Republican	March 4, 1871 – March 3, 1873	42nd	Elected in 1870. Redistricted to the 24th district.	
William E. Lansing (Chittenango)	Republican	March 4, 1873 – March 3, 1875	43rd	Redistricted from the 22nd district and re-elected in 1872. [data missing]	
Scott Lord (Utica)	Democratic	March 4, 1875 – March 3, 1877	44th	Elected in 1874. [data missing]	
William J. Bacon (Utica)	Republican	March 4, 1877 – March 3, 1879	45th	Elected in 1876. [data missing]	
Cyrus D. Prescott (Rome)	Republican	March 4, 1879 – March 3, 1883	46th 47th	Elected in 1878. Re-elected in 1880. [data missing]	
John T. Spriggs (Utica)	Democratic	March 4, 1883 – March 3, 1887	48th 49th	Elected in 1882. Re-elected in 1884. [data missing]	
James S. Sherman (Dover Plains)	Republican	March 4, 1887 – March 3, 1891	50th 51st	Elected in 1886. Re-elected in 1888. [data missing]	
Henry W. Bentley (Boonville)	Democratic	March 4, 1891 – March 3, 1893	52nd	Elected in 1890. [data missing]	
John M. Wever (Plattsburg)	Republican	March 4, 1893 – March 3, 1895	53rd	Redistricted from the 21st district and re-elected in 1892. [data missing]	
Wallace T. Foote Jr. (Port Henry)	Republican	March 4, 1895 – March 3, 1899	54th 55th	Elected in 1894. Re-elected in 1896. [data missing]	
Louis W. Emerson (Warrensburg)	Republican	March 4, 1899 – March 3, 1903	56th 57th	Elected in 1898. Re-elected in 1900. [data missing]	
George N. Southwick (Albany)	Republican	March 4, 1903 – March 3, 1911	58th 59th 60th 61st	Redistricted from the 20th district and re-elected in 1902. Re-elected in 1904. Re-elected in 1906. Re-elected in 1908. [data missing]	
Henry S. De Forest (Schenectady)	Republican	March 4, 1911 – March 3, 1913	62nd	Elected in 1910. [data missing]	
Joseph A. Goulden (The Bronx)	Democratic	March 4, 1913 – May 3, 1915	63rd 64th	Elected in 1912. Re-elected in 1914. Died.	
Vacant		May 3, 1915 – November 2, 1915	64th		
William Bennet (New York)	Republican	November 2, 1915 – March 3, 1917	64th	Elected to finish Goulden's term. [data missing]	
Daniel C. Oliver (New York)	Democratic	March 4, 1917 – March 3, 1919	65th	Elected in 1916. [data missing]	
Richard F. McKiniry (New York)	Democratic	March 4, 1919 – March 3, 1921	66th	Elected in 1918. [data missing]	
Albert B. Rossdale (New York)	Republican	March 4, 1921 – March 3, 1923	67th	Elected in 1920. [data missing]	
Frank A. Oliver (The Bronx)	Democratic	March 4, 1923 – June 18, 1934	68th 69th 70th 71st 72nd 73rd	Elected in 1922. Re-elected in 1924. Re-elected in 1926. Re-elected in 1928. Re-elected in 1930. Re-elected in 1932. Resigned when appointed justice of the Court of Special Sessions.	
Vacant		June 18, 1934 – January 3, 1935	73rd		
Charles A. Buckley (New York)	Democratic	January 3, 1935 – January 3, 1945	74th 75th 76th 77th 78th	Elected in 1934. Re-elected in 1936. Re-elected in 1938. Re-elected in 1940. Re-elected in 1942. Redistricted to the 25th district.	
Walter A. Lynch (New York)	Democratic	January 3, 1945 – January 3, 1951	79th 80th 81st	Redistricted from the 22nd district and re-elected in 1944. Re-elected in 1946. Re-elected in 1948. [data missing]	
Sidney A. Fine (New York)	Democratic	January 3, 1951 – January 3, 1953	82nd	Elected in 1950. Redistricted to the 22nd district.	
Isidore Dollinger (New York)	Democratic	January 3, 1953 – December 31, 1959	83rd 84th 85th 86th	Redistricted from the 24th district and re-elected in 1952. Re-elected in 1954. Re-elected in 1956. Re-elected in 1958. Resigned.	
Vacant		January 1, 1960 – March 7, 1960	86th		
Jacob H. Gilbert (New York)	Democratic	March 8, 1960 – January 3, 1963	86th 87th	Elected in 1960. Redistricted to the 22nd district.	
Charles A. Buckley (New York)	Democratic	January 3, 1963 – January 3, 1965	88th	Redistricted from the 24th district and re-elected in 1962. [data missing]	
Jonathan Bingham (The Bronx)	Democratic	January 3, 1965 – January 3, 1973	89th 90th 91st 92nd	Elected in 1964. Re-elected in 1966. Re-elected in 1968. Re-elected in 1970. Redistricted to the 22nd district.	
Peter A. Peyser (Irvington)	Republican	January 3, 1973 – January 3, 1977	93rd 94th	Redistricted from the 25th district and re-elected in 1972. Re-elected in 1974. [data missing]	
Bruce Caputo (Yonkers)	Republican	January 3, 1977 – January 3, 1979	95th	Elected in 1976. [data missing]	
Peter A. Peyser (Irvington)	Democratic	January 3, 1979 – January 3, 1983	96th 97th	Elected in 1978. Re-elected in 1980. [data missing]	
Samuel S. Stratton (Schenectady)	Democratic	January 3, 1983 – January 3, 1989	98th 99th 100th	Redistricted from the 28th districtand re-elected in 1982. Re-elected in 1984. Re-elected in 1986. [data missing]	
Michael McNulty (Green Island)	Democratic	January 3, 1989 – January 3, 1993	101st 102nd	Elected in 1988. Re-elected in 1990. Redistricted to the 21st district.	
Sherwood Boehlert (New Hartford)	Republican	January 3, 1993 – January 3, 2003	103rd 104th 105th 106th 107th	Redistricted from the 25th district and re-elected in 1992. Re-elected in 1994. Re-elected in 1996. Re-elected in 1998. Re-elected in 2000. Redistricted to the 24th district.	
John M. McHugh (Pierrepont Manor)	Republican	January 3, 2003 – September 21, 2009	108th 109th 110th 111th	Redistricted from the 24th district and re-elected in 2002. Re-elected in 2004. Re-elected in 2006. Re-elected in 2008. Resigned to become U.S. Secretary of the Army.	2003–2013
Vacant		September 21, 2009 – November 6, 2009	111th		2003–2013
Bill Owens (Plattsburgh)	Democratic	November 6, 2009 – January 3, 2013	111th 112th	Elected to finish McHugh's term. Re-elected in 2010. Redistricted to the 21st district.	2003–2013
Tom Reed (Corning)	Republican	January 3, 2013 – May 10, 2022	113th 114th 115th 116th 117th	Redistricted from the 29th district and re-elected in 2012. Re-elected in 2014. Re-elected in 2016. Re-elected in 2018. Re-elected in 2020. Announced retirement, then resigned.	2013–2023
Vacant		May 10, 2022 – September 13, 2022	117th		2013–2023
Joe Sempolinski (Canisteo)	Republican	September 13, 2022 – January 3, 2023	117th	Elected to finish Reed's term. Retired.	2013–2023
Nick Langworthy (Pendleton)	Republican	January 3, 2023 – present	118th 119th	Elected in 2022. Re-elected in 2024. Re-elected in 2026.	2023–2025
Nick Langworthy (Pendleton)	Republican	January 3, 2023 – present	118th 119th	Elected in 2022. Re-elected in 2024. Re-elected in 2026.	2025–present

== Recent election results ==
In New York, there are numerous minor parties at various points on the political spectrum. Certain parties often endorse either the Republican or Democratic candidate for every office, hence the state electoral results contain both the party votes and the final candidate votes.

US House election, 1984: New York District 23
Party	Candidate	Votes	%	±%
Democratic	Samuel S. Stratton (incumbent)	188,144	77.8	
Republican	Frank Wicks	53,060	21.9	
Socialist Workers	Richard Ariza	642	0.3	
Majority		135,084	55.9	
Turnout		241,846	100	

US House election, 1996: New York District 23
Party	Candidate	Votes	%	±%
Republican	Sherwood Boehlert (incumbent)	124,626	64.3	
Democratic	Bruce W. Hapanowicz	50,436	26.0	
Independence	Thomas E. Loughlin, Jr.	10,835	5.6	
Right to Life	William Tapley	7,790	4.0	
Majority		74,190	38.3	
Turnout		193,687		

US House election, 1998: New York District 23
Party	Candidate	Votes	%	±%
Republican	Sherwood Boehlert (incumbent)	111,242	80.8	+16.5
Conservative	David Vickers	26,493	19.2	+19.2
Majority		84,749	61.5	+23.2
Turnout		137,735		−28.9

US House election, 2000: New York District 23
Party	Candidate	Votes	%	±%
Republican	Sherwood Boehlert (incumbent)	124,132	60.5	−20.3
Conservative	David Vickers	42,854	20.9	+1.7
Democratic	Richard W. Englebrecht	38,049	18.6	+18.6
Majority		81,278	39.6	−21.9
Turnout		205,535		+48.9

US House election, 2002: New York District 23
Party	Candidate	Votes	%	±%
Republican	John M. McHugh	124,682	100	+39.5
Majority		124,682	100	+61.4
Turnout		124,682		−39.2

US House election, 2004: New York District 23
Party	Candidate	Votes	%	±%
Republican	John M. McHugh (incumbent)	160,079	70.7	−29.3
Democratic	Robert J. Johnson	66,448	29.3	+29.3
Majority		93,631	41.3	−59.7
Turnout		226,527		+81.7

US House election, 2006: New York District 23
Party	Candidate	Votes	%	±%
Republican	John M. McHugh (incumbent)	106,781	63.1	−7.6
Democratic	Robert J. Johnson	62,318	36.9	+7.6
Majority		44,463	26.3	−15.0
Turnout		169,099		−25.4

US House election, 2008: New York District 23
Party	Candidate	Votes	%	±%
Republican	John M. McHugh (incumbent)	129,991	65.3	+2.2
Democratic	Michael P. Oot	69,112	34.7	−2.2
Majority		60,879	30.6	
Turnout		199,103		+17.7

New York's 23rd congressional district special election, 2009
Party	Candidate	Votes	%	±%
Democratic	Bill Owens	73,137	48.3	+14.0
Conservative	Doug Hoffman	69,553	46.0	+25.1 (2000)
Republican	Dede Scozzafava (withdrew, but still on the ballot)	8,582	5.7	−59.6
Majority		3,584	2.4	−28.2
Turnout		151,272		−24.0

Scozzafava dropped out of the race just prior to the election and endorsed Democrat Bill Owens. The results were not certified by the New York State Board of Elections until December 15, 2009.

US House election, 2010: New York District 23
Party	Candidate	Votes	%	±%
Democratic	Bill Owens (incumbent)	82,232	47.5	−0.8
Republican	Matt Doheny	80,237	46.4	+40.7
Conservative	Doug Hoffman	10,507	6.1	−39.9
Majority		1,995	1.2	−1.2
Turnout		172,976		+14.3

23rd Congressional District Election Results (2012)
Party	Candidate	Votes	%
Republican	Tom Reed (incumbent)	126,519	51.9
Democratic	Nate Shinagawa	117,055	48.1
Total votes		243,571	100.0

23rd Congressional District Election Results (2014)
Party	Candidate	Votes	%
Republican	Tom Reed (incumbent)	113,130	59.4
Democratic	Martha Robertson	70,242	36.9
Total votes		190,554	100.0

23rd Congressional District Election Results (2016)
Party	Candidate	Votes	%
Republican	Tom Reed (incumbent)	161,050	57.6
Democratic	John Plumb	118,584	42.4
Total votes		279,634	100.0

23rd Congressional District Election Results (2018)
Party	Candidate	Votes	%
Republican	Tom Reed (incumbent)	130,323	54.2
Democratic	Tracy Mitrano	109,932	45.8
Total votes		240,255	100.0

23rd Congressional District Election Results (2020)
Party	Candidate	Votes	%
Republican	Tom Reed (incumbent)	181,060	57.7
Democratic	Tracy Mitrano	129,014	41.1
Libertarian	Andrew Kolstee	3,650	1.2
Total votes		313,724	100.0

23rd Congressional District Special Election Results (2022)
Party	Candidate	Votes	%
Republican	Joe Sempolinski	38,749	53.1
Democratic	Max Della Pia	34,001	46.6
Write-in		218	0.3
Total votes		72,968	100.0

23rd Congressional District Election Results (2022)
Party	Candidate	Votes	%
Republican	Nick Langworthy	192,694	64.9
Democratic	Max Della Pia	104,114	35.1
Total votes		296,808	100.0

23rd Congressional District Election Results (2024)
Party	Candidate	Votes	%
Republican	Nick Langworthy	213,928	57.0
Conservative	Nick Langworthy	33,041	8.8
Total	Nick Langworthy (incumbent)	246,969	65.8
Democratic	Thomas Carle	128,397	34.2
Total votes		375,366	100.0
Republican hold			

== See also ==
- List of United States congressional districts
- New York's congressional delegations
- New York's congressional districts

== Sources ==
- Martis, Kenneth C. (1989). The Historical Atlas of Political Parties in the United States Congress. New York: Macmillan Publishing Company.
- Martis, Kenneth C. (1982). The Historical Atlas of United States Congressional Districts. New York: Macmillan Publishing Company.
