= John M. McHugh =

American politician (born 1948)

John McHugh
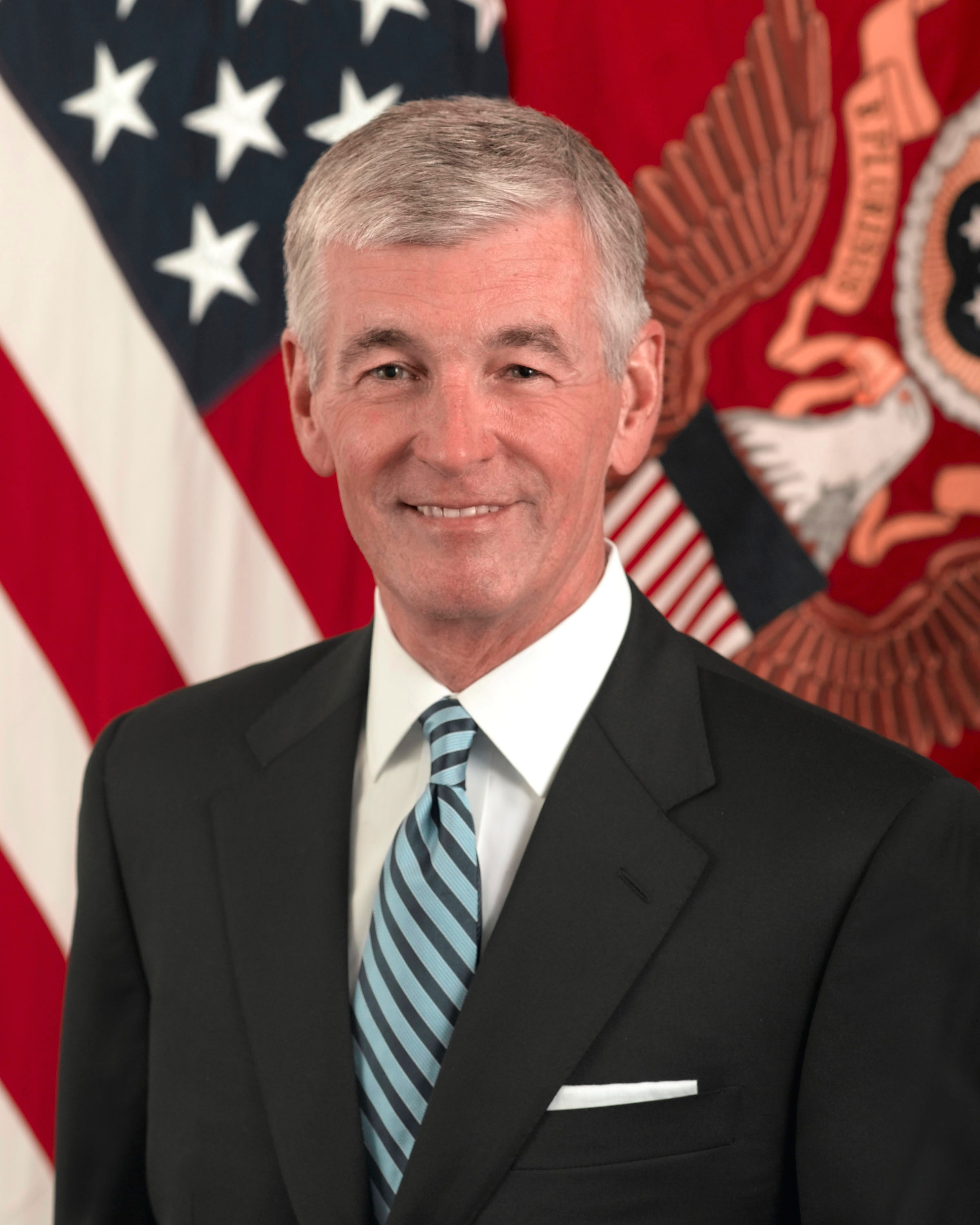
- Official portrait, 2009

21st United States Secretary of the Army
- In office September 21, 2009 – November 1, 2015
- President: Barack Obama
- Preceded by: Pete Geren
- Succeeded by: Eric Fanning

Ranking Member of the House Armed Services Committee
- In office January 3, 2009 – June 9, 2009
- Leader: John Boehner
- Preceded by: Duncan Hunter
- Succeeded by: Buck McKeon

Member of the U.S. House of Representatives from New York
- In office January 3, 1993 – September 21, 2009
- Preceded by: Gerald Solomon
- Succeeded by: Bill Owens
- Constituency: 24th district (1993–2003); 23rd district (2003–2009)

Member of the New York State Senate from the 46th district
- In office January 1, 1985 – November 8, 1992
- Preceded by: H. Douglas Barclay
- Succeeded by: James W. Wright

Personal details
- Born: John Michael McHugh; September 29, 1948 (age 77) Watertown, New York, U.S.
- Party: Republican
- Spouse: Katherine Sullivan (divorced)
- Education: Syracuse University; Utica College (BA); State University of New York, Albany (MPA)
- McHugh's voice McHugh testifying before the Senate Armed Services Committee on the 2014 Fort Hood shootings. Recorded April 3, 2014

John Michael McHugh (born September 29, 1948) is an American politician from the U.S. state of New York who served as the 21st United States Secretary of the Army, and represented the state's 23rd congressional district in the United States House of Representatives.

In June 2009, President Barack Obama nominated McHugh to the position of United States Secretary of the Army. His nomination was confirmed by the United States Senate and he took office on September 21, 2009.

In July 2015, McHugh announced his intent to resign by November 2015. He retired on November 1, 2015 after more than six years of service. On September 18, 2015, President Obama nominated Eric Fanning to be his replacement.

== Early life and career ==
McHugh was born in Watertown, New York. He graduated from Watertown High School in 1966 and attended Syracuse University; in 1970 he graduated from Utica College with a B.A. in political science. He later went on to receive a Master of Public Administration degree from the Nelson A. Rockefeller Graduate School of Public Affairs at the State University of New York at Albany in 1977.

Though he was of draft age during the Vietnam War, McHugh did not serve in the military. He was an assistant to the Watertown city manager from 1971 to 1977. He served as an aide to State Senator H. Douglas Barclay from 1977 to 1984, when he was elected as Barclay's successor. McHugh was a member of the New York State Senate from 1985 to 1992, sitting in the 186th, 187th, 188th and 189th New York State Legislatures.

McHugh is also a member on the Board of Directors at the Atlantic Council.

== Congressional career ==
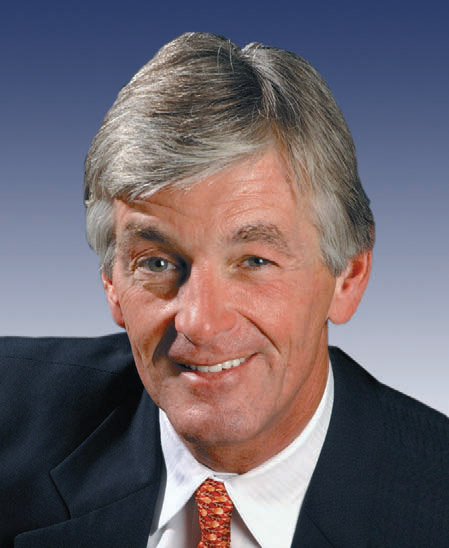
McHugh as a Congressman

He ran successfully for the U.S. House of Representatives in 1992 to replace Congressman David O'Brien Martin in the 24th district, which was renumbered as the 23rd district following redistricting after the 2000 census. This part of Upstate New York has historically been very Republican at the congressional level, though it has recently become more competitive in presidential elections. The district (and its predecessors) had been in Republican hands continuously since 1871, and some parts of the district had been represented by a Democrat since 1851. McHugh was reelected eight times with no substantive opposition, running unopposed in 2002.

McHugh was a member of the board of directors of the United States Military Academy in West Point, New York for 14 years, including a term as chairman.

McHugh was the ranking Republican on the House Armed Services Committee, and was also a senior member of the Oversight and Government Reform Committee. He was chairman of the Oversight Committee's Post Service Subcommittee for six years, and worked to pass legislation to significantly reform the U.S. Postal Service for the first time since it was demoted from a Cabinet-rank department with passage of the Postal Accountability and Enhancement Act (Pub. L. 109–435 (text) (PDF)) in 2006. He was a member of the House Permanent Select Committee on Intelligence from 2005 to 2009.

McHugh defeated his Democratic opponent, Dr. Robert J. Johnson, in 2004 and again in 2006. During the campaign, Dr. Johnson found himself unable to fly due to his name appearing on the No Fly List. At the time, Johnson speculated that he was added to the list because of his anti-war views and opposition to McHugh. McHugh's office denied any wrongdoing. A later CBS News investigation discovered that the name "Robert Johnson" appeared on the list due to its use as an alias by a man convicted of plotting bombings in Toronto. Several other men named Robert Johnson were affected by its inclusion.

McHugh was the only one of New York's eight Republican House incumbents to win more than 60% of the vote in 2006. The other seven were either defeated or were held below 60% by their Democratic challengers. McHugh defeated Democrat Mike Oot in 2008, garnering 65.3% of the vote.

== Political views ==
McHugh is a moderate Republican. He had a lifetime rating of 83% from the American Conservative Union.

He was one of only 8 House Republicans to vote "yes" the American Clean Energy Act (also known as Cap and Trade) on June 26, 2009; the measure passed by only eight votes.

== Secretary of the Army ==
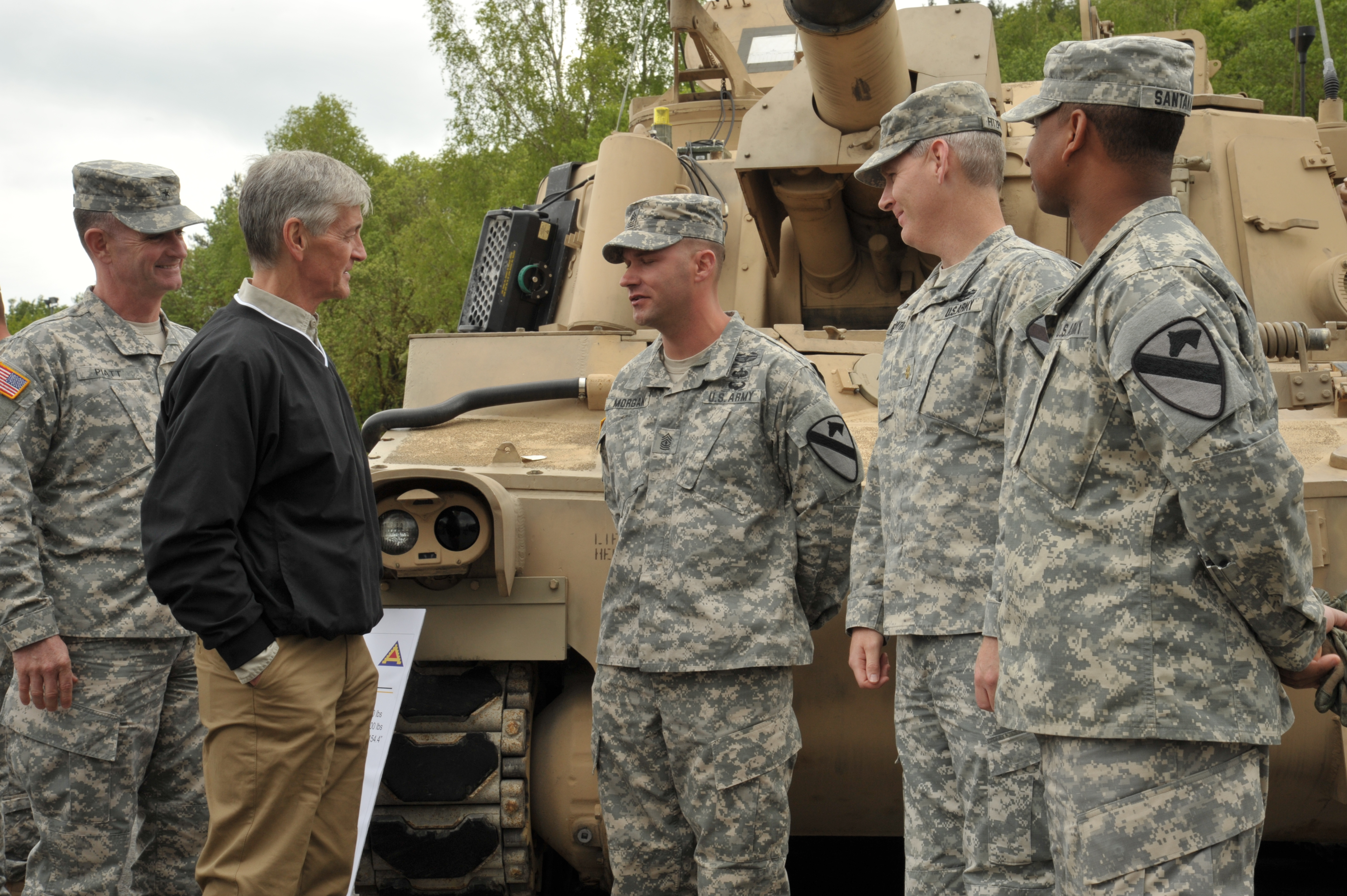
Visits with soldiers from 14 NATO and European partner nations during exercise Combined Resolve II at the Hohenfels Training Area, Germany, May 17, 2014.

On June 2, 2009, McHugh was nominated to the position of Secretary of the Army, by President Barack Obama. He was confirmed by the Senate in a voice vote on September 16, 2009. He was sworn in as the 21st Secretary of the Army at a Pentagon ceremony on September 21, 2009. McHugh, a Republican appointed by a Democratic president, succeeded Pete Geren, a Democrat appointed by a Republican president. McHugh never served in the military, but in nominating him, President Obama indicated his view that McHugh's extensive experience on the House Armed Services Committee had prepared him to serve as the Army's top civilian.

In March 2010 McHugh said that he would not pursue discharges against soldiers who told him privately that they were gay. McHugh said he has talked to openly gay soldiers as part of assessing the force's opinion on the repeal of a controversial law that bans openly gay people from serving in the military. Under then current law, known as "Don't ask, don't tell," service members who declare that they are gay would have to be discharged.

In May 2010, McHugh was granted an honorary degree from the State University of New York Board of Trustees, to be presented during the commencement ceremonies at SUNY Oswego. When the decision to award McHugh the honorary degree was made public, the SUNY Oswego Pride Alliance, an LGBT student group, organized a protest to be held on campus during the ceremony, with students specifically taking issue with his voting record on gay rights. Following weeks of debate on campus, which included a Student Association Senate resolution condemning the "Don't Ask, Don't Tell" policy, McHugh withdrew from the ceremony, stating, "it is obvious that my presence at the ceremony might well have a disruptive effect."

In March 2015, McHugh revoked a rule allowing Women Airforce Service Pilots (WASPs) to have their ashes interred at Arlington National Cemetery, ruling these women lacked eligibility due to their classification during the war as civilians. This, in spite of the hazards of the duty (38 died while serving their country). After McHugh stepped down, Congress introduced legislation to reverse McHugh's action. The legislation passed on May 12, 2016, and was signed into law by President Obama on May 20, 2016.

In July 2015, McHugh announced his intent to resign as secretary by November 1, 2015. He had "expressed his desire to [do so] several weeks" earlier. At the time of the announcement defense secretary Ashton Carter and senior New York senator Charles Schumer expressed praise and appreciation for McHugh's service.

In September 2015, President Obama nominated Eric Fanning, who had been serving most recently as interim under secretary, to be McHugh's permanent replacement as secretary.

On October 23, 2015 the Army conducted a farewell ceremony for McHugh, which was presided over by Secretary of Defense Ashton Carter. During the ceremony McHugh was presented with the Department of Defense Medal for Distinguished Public Service. McHugh completed his term on October 31, 2015.

== Later career ==
In June 2016, the K&L Gates international law firm announced that McHugh and his longtime aide, Anne LeMay, had joined the firm to advise clients on procurement and other defense policy matters.

== Personal ==
McHugh is divorced from Katherine Sullivan, a daughter of Assemblywoman Frances T. Sullivan. He lives in the hamlet of Pierrepont Manor.

In 2006, McHugh was named one of the 50 most beautiful people on Capitol Hill by The Hill magazine.

== See also ==
- List of U.S. political appointments that crossed party lines

U.S. House of Representatives
Preceded by Gerald B. H. Solomon	Member of the U.S. House of Representatives from New York's 24th congressional district 1993–2003	Succeeded by Sherwood Boehlert
Preceded by Sherwood Boehlert	Member of the U.S. House of Representatives from New York's 23rd congressional district 2003–2009	Succeeded by Bill Owens
Political offices
Preceded by Pete Geren	United States Secretary of the Army; 2009–2015	Succeeded by Eric Fanning; Acting
U.S. order of precedence (ceremonial)
Preceded by Randy Forbes as Former U.S. Representative	Order of precedence of the United States as Former U.S. Representative	Succeeded by Steve Israel as Former U.S. Representative
