= 2026 United States House of Representatives elections in California (districts 27–52) =

- November 3, 2026

All 52 California seats to the United States House of Representatives
- Reporting: 83.0% as of Nov 10 at 10:12 AM PST
	Majority party	Minority party	Third party
Party	Democratic	Republican	Independent
Last election	43	9	0
Seats before	43	8	1
Seats after	48	4	0
Seat change	▲5	▼4	▼1
Popular vote	7,645,126	3,232,011	76,313
Percentage	69.80%	29.51%	0.70%

Democratic hold Democratic gain
Republican hold
Democratic
50–60%
60–70%
70–80%
80–90%
90–100%
Republican
50–60%
60–70%
70–80%
90–100%

Passed map under California Proposition 50 (effective 2027–2033 starting with the 2026 elections) Interactive map version

The 2026 United States House of Representatives elections in California were held on November 3, 2026, to elect the 52 U.S. representatives from the State of California, one from each of the state's congressional districts. The elections coincided with other elections to the House of Representatives, elections to the United States Senate, and various state and local elections. The passage of Proposition 50 in 2025 significantly altered many districts. The primary elections took place on June 2, 2026.

== Overview ==
United States House of Representatives elections in California, 2026 primary election — June 2, 2026
Party	Votes	Percentage	Candidates	Advancing to general	Seats contesting
Democratic	5,633,898	63.83	154	59	51
Republican	3,036,585	34.40	96	44	43
No party preference	136,016	1.54	32	1	1
Peace and Freedom	8,764	0.10	2	0	0
Libertarian	8,725	0.10	4	0	0
Green	2,352	0.03	1	0	0
Total	8,826,340	100.00	289	104	—

United States House of Representatives elections in California, 2026 General election — November 3, 2026
Party	Votes	Percentage	Seats before	Seats after	+/–
Democratic	7,645,126	69.80%	43	48	▲5
Republican	3,232,011	29.51%	8	4	▼4
No party preference	76,313	0.70%	1	0	▼1
Totals	10,953,450	100.00%	52	52	—

== District 27 ==
2026 California's 27th congressional district election
- Reporting: 98% as of Nov 10 at 10:12 AM PST
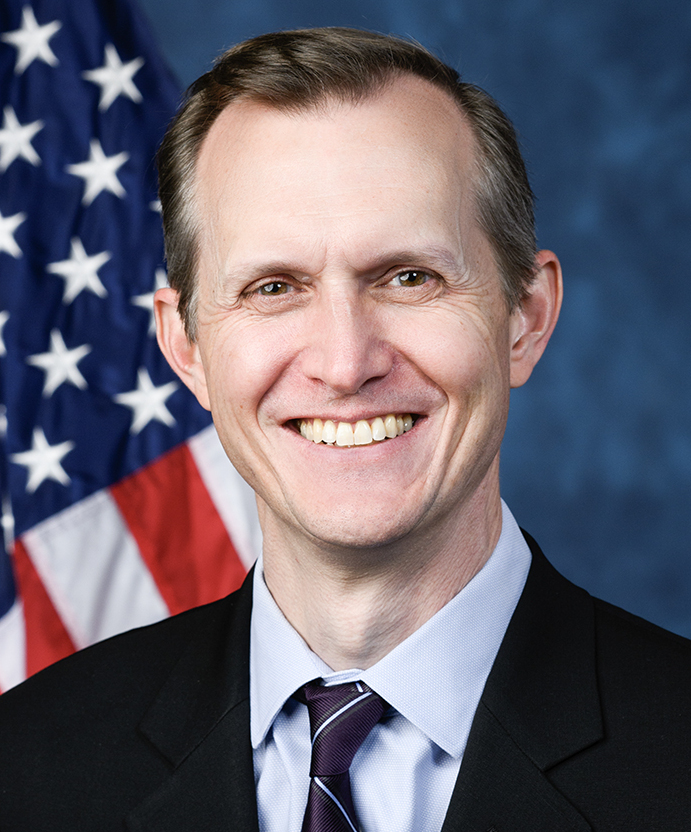

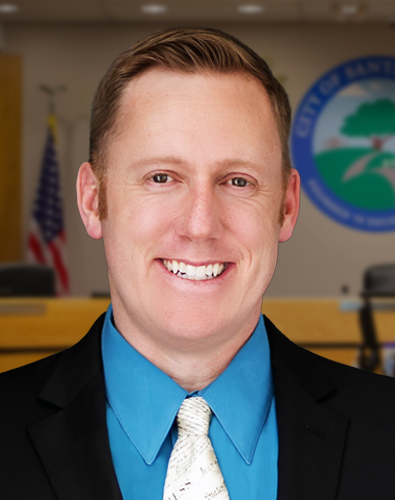
Candidate	George Whitesides	Jason Gibbs
Party	Democratic	Republican
Popular vote	147,101	82,524
Percentage	64.1%	35.9%
U.S. Representative before election
George Whitesides
Democratic
Elected U.S. Representative
George Whitesides
Democratic

California's 27th congressional district boundary from the 2026 elections Interactive map version

The incumbent is Democrat George Whitesides, who flipped the district and was elected with 51.3% of the vote in 2024.

=== Primary ===
==== Advanced to general ====
- Jason Gibbs (Republican), Santa Clarita city councilor (2020–present)
- George Whitesides (Democratic), incumbent U.S. representative

==== Eliminated in primary ====
- Caleb Norwood (Democratic)
- Roberto Ramos (Democratic), retired military analyst

==== Endorsements ====
Jason Gibbs (R)

U.S. representatives

- Mike Garcia, CA-27 (2020–2025)

Political parties

- California Republican Party
George Whitesides (D)

Labor unions

- California Federation of Labor Unions
- National Union of Healthcare Workers

Organizations

- 314 Action
- AIPAC
- Brady Campaign
- End Citizens United
- Giffords
- Jewish Democratic Council of America
- Joint Action Committee for Political Affairs
- League of Conservation Voters Action Fund
- Planned Parenthood Action Fund
- Reproductive Freedom for All
- Sierra Club
- Stonewall Democratic Club

Political parties

- California Democratic Party

==== Fundraising ====
Campaign finance reports as of May 13, 2026
Candidate	Raised	Spent	Cash on hand
Jason Gibbs (R)	$346,900	$154,920	$191,980
Caleb Norwood (D)	$350	$0	$350
George Whitesides (D)	$3,536,154	$1,541,321	$2,321,567
Source: Federal Election Commission

==== Results ====
Primary results
Party	Candidate	Votes	%
Republican	Jason Gibbs	62,758	40.98
Democratic	George Whitesides (incumbent)	62,214	40.63
Democratic	Roberto Ramos	14,868	9.71
Democratic	Caleb Norwood	13,293	8.68
Total votes		153,133	100.0

=== General election ===
==== Predictions ====
Source	Ranking	As of
Decision Desk HQ	Safe D	July 14, 2026
Inside Elections	Solid D	November 6, 2025
The Cook Political Report	Solid D	November 5, 2025
Sabato's Crystal Ball	Safe D	February 5, 2026
The Economist	Safe D	May 6, 2026

==== Fundraising ====
Campaign finance reports as of May 13, 2026
Candidate	Raised	Spent	Cash on hand
George Whitesides (D)	$3,536,154	$1,541,321	$2,321,567
Jason Gibbs (R)	$346,900	$154,920	$191,980
Source: Federal Election Commission

==== Results ====
2026 California's 27th congressional district election
Party	Candidate	Votes	%	±%
Democratic	George Whitesides (incumbent)			
Republican	Jason Gibbs			
Total votes				

== District 28 ==
2026 California's 28th congressional district election
- Reporting: 98% as of Nov 10 at 10:12 AM PST
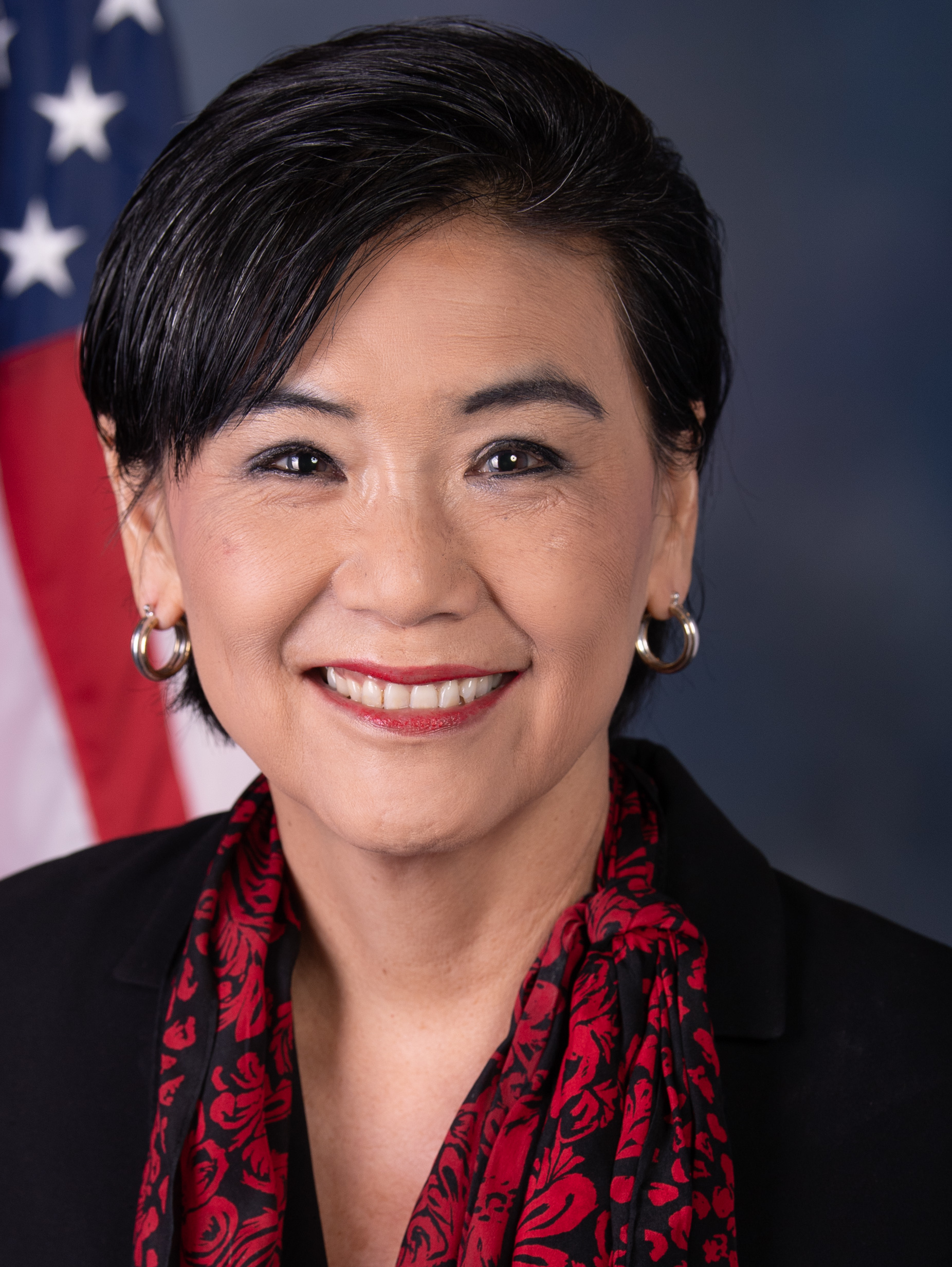

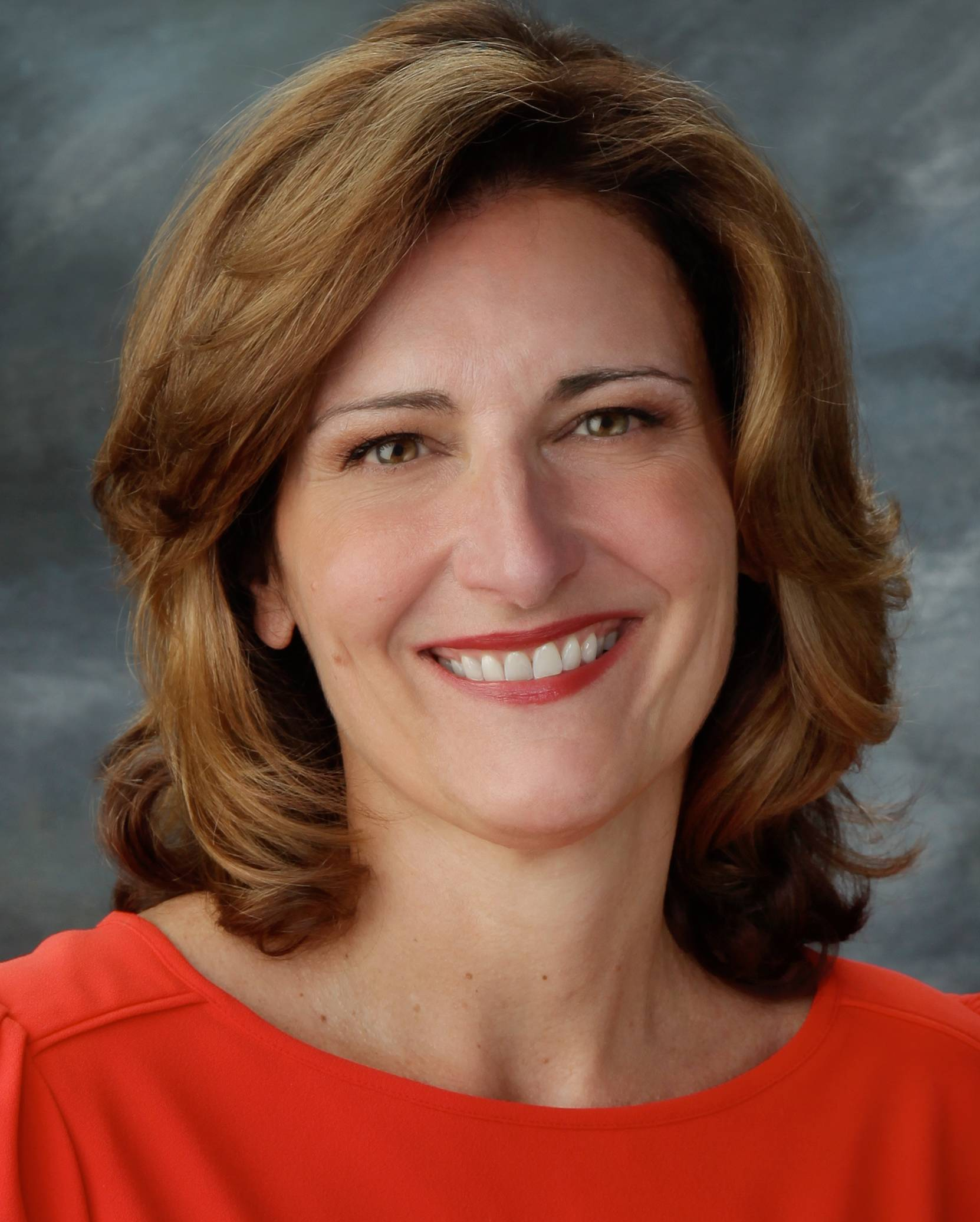
Candidate	Judy Chu	April Verlato
Party	Democratic	Republican
Popular vote	179,045	78,432
Percentage	69.5%	30.5%
U.S. Representative before election
Judy Chu
Democratic
Elected U.S. Representative
Judy Chu
Democratic

California's 28th congressional district boundary from the 2026 elections Interactive map version

The incumbent is Democrat Judy Chu, who was reelected with 64.9% of the vote in 2024.

=== Primary ===
==== Advanced to general ====
- Judy Chu (Democratic), incumbent U.S. representative
- April Verlato (Republican), former Arcadia city councilor (2016–2024) and runner-up for this district in 2024

==== Eliminated in primary ====
- Peter Roybal (Democratic), businessman

==== Withdrawn ====
- Robert Thomas Gonzalez (Democratic), retail worker

==== Endorsements ====
Judy Chu (D)

U.S. senators

- Alex Padilla, California (2021–present)
- Adam Schiff, California (2024–present)

U.S. representatives

- Pete Aguilar, CA-33 (2015–present)
- Nanette Barragan, CA-44 (2017–present)
- Ami Bera, CA-06 (2013–present)
- Julia Brownley, CA-26 (2013–present)
- Salud Carbajal, CA-24 (2017–present)
- Gil Cisneros, CA-31 (2019-2021, 2025–present)
- Lou Correa, CA-46 (2017–present)
- Jim Costa, CA-21 (2005–present)
- Mark DeSaulnier, CA-10 (2015–present)
- Laura Friedman, CA-30 (2025–present)
- John Garamendi, CA-08 (2009–present)
- Robert Garcia, CA-42 (2023–present)
- Jimmy Gomez, CA-34 (2017–present)
- Adam Gray, CA-13 (2025–present)
- Jared Huffman, CA-02 (2013–present)
- Sara Jacobs, CA-51 (2023–present)
- Sydney Kamlager-Dove, CA-37 (2023–present)
- Ro Khanna, CA-17 (2017–present)
- Mike Levin, CA-49 (2019–present)
- Sam Liccardo, CA-16 (2025–present)
- Ted Lieu, CA-36 (2015–present)
- Zoe Lofgren, CA-18 (1994–present)
- Doris Matsui, CA-07 (2005–present)
- Dave Min, CA-47 (2025–present)
- Kevin Mullin, CA-15 (2023–present)
- Jimmy Panetta, CA-19 (2017–present)
- Nancy Pelosi, former speaker of the House (2007–2011, 2019–2023) from CA-11 (1987–present)
- Scott Peters, CA-50 (2013–present)
- Luz Rivas, CA-29 (2025–present)
- Raul Ruiz, CA-25 (2013–present)
- Linda Sanchez, CA-38 (2003–present)
- Brad Sherman, CA-32 (1997–present)
- Lateefah Simon, CA-12 (2025–present)
- Mark Takano, CA-39 (2013–present)
- Mike Thompson, CA-04 (1999–present)
- Norma Torres, CA-35 (2015–present)
- Derek Tran, CA-45 (2025–present)
- Maxine Waters, CA-43 (1991–present)
- George Whitesides, CA-27 (2025–present)

Statewide officials

- Rob Bonta, attorney general of California (2021–present)
- Eleni Kounalakis, lieutenant governor of California (2019–present)
- Gavin Newsom, governor of California (2019–present)

Local officials

- Karen Bass, Mayor of Los Angeles (2022–present)

Labor unions

- California Federation of Labor Unions
- National Union of Healthcare Workers

Organizations

- California Environmental Voters
- East Area Progressive Democrats
- Giffords
- J Street
- National Women's Political Caucus
- Planned Parenthood Action Fund
- Progressive Democrats of America
- Sierra Club
- Stonewall Democratic Club

Political parties

- California Democratic Party

==== Fundraising ====
Campaign finance reports as of May 13, 2026
Candidate	Raised	Spent	Cash on hand
Judy Chu (D)	$859,302	$794,231	$3,667,076
April Verlato (R)	$50	$7,490	$398
Source: Federal Election Commission

==== Results ====
Primary results
Party	Candidate	Votes	%
Democratic	Judy Chu (incumbent)	116,321	62.23
Republican	April Verlato	60,020	32.11
Democratic	Peter Roybal	10,584	5.66
Total votes		186,925	100.0

=== General election ===
==== Predictions ====
Source	Ranking	As of
Decision Desk HQ	Safe D	July 14, 2026
The Cook Political Report	Solid D	November 5, 2025
Inside Elections	Solid D	March 7, 2025
Sabato's Crystal Ball	Safe D	July 15, 2025
The Economist	Safe D	May 6, 2026

==== Fundraising ====
Campaign finance reports as of May 13, 2026
Candidate	Raised	Spent	Cash on hand
Judy Chu (D)	$859,302	$794,231	$3,667,076
April Verlato (R)	$50	$7,490	$398
Source: Federal Election Commission

==== Results ====
2026 California's 28th congressional district election
Party	Candidate	Votes	%	±%
Democratic	Judy Chu (incumbent)			
Republican	April Verlato			
Total votes				

== District 29 ==
2026 California's 29th congressional district election
- Reporting: 98% as of Nov 10 at 10:12 AM PST

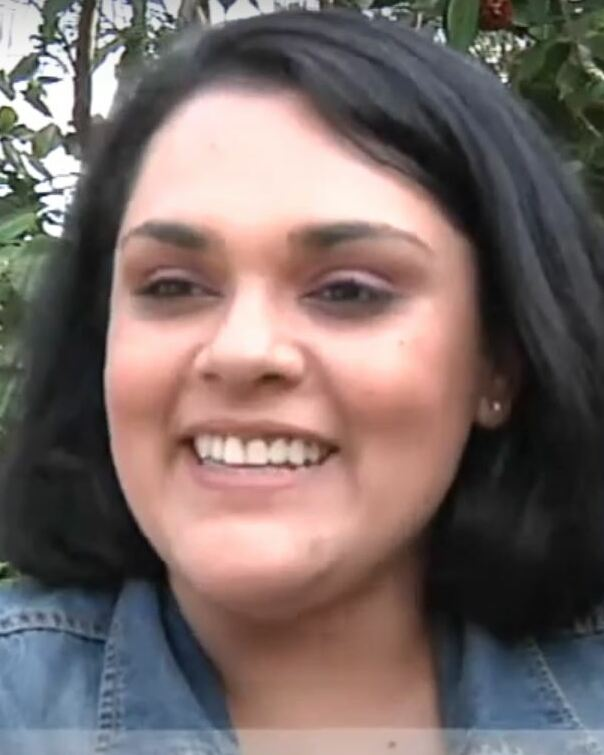
Candidate	Luz Rivas	Angélica María Dueñas
Party	Democratic	Democratic
Popular vote	99,017	73,426
Percentage	57.4%	42.6%
U.S. Representative before election
Luz Rivas
Democratic
Elected U.S. Representative
Luz Rivas
Democratic

California's 29th congressional district boundary from the 2026 elections Interactive map version

The incumbent is Democrat Luz Rivas, who was elected with 69.8% of the vote in 2024.

=== Primary ===
==== Advanced to general ====
- Angélica María Dueñas (Democratic), former president of the Sun Valley neighborhood council, runner-up for this district in 2020 and 2022, and candidate in 2018 and 2024
- Luz Rivas (Democratic), incumbent U.S. representative

==== Eliminated in primary ====
- Rudy Melendez (Republican), organized labor advocate

==== Endorsements ====
Rudy Melendez (R)

Political parties

- California Republican Party
Luz Rivas (D)

Labor unions

- California Federation of Labor Unions

Organizations

- 314 Action
- AIPAC
- California Environmental Voters
- Center for Biological Diversity Action Fund
- Democratic Majority for Israel
- Elect Democratic Women
- Giffords
- League of Conservation Voters Action Fund
- National Women's Political Caucus
- Planned Parenthood Action Fund
- PODER PAC
- Sierra Club
- Stonewall Democratic Club
- Stonewall Young Democrats

Political parties

- California Democratic Party
- Los Angeles County Democratic Party
Angélica María Dueñas (D)

Organizations

- Courage for Democracy
- Feel the Bern San Fernando Valley
- Knock LA
- Progressive Voters Network
- Track AIPAC

==== Fundraising ====
Campaign finance reports as of May 13, 2026
Candidate	Raised	Spent	Cash on hand
Angélica María Dueñas (D)	$29,617	$24,004	$5,516
Luz Rivas (D)	$591,478	$491,886	$363,886
Source: Federal Election Commission

==== Results ====
Primary results
Party	Candidate	Votes	%
Democratic	Luz Maria Rivas (incumbent)	62,385	51.04
Democratic	Angélica María Dueñas	30,469	24.93
Republican	Rudy Melendez	29,362	24.02
Total votes		122,216	100.0

=== General election ===
==== Predictions ====
Source	Ranking	As of
Decision Desk HQ	Safe D	July 14, 2026
The Cook Political Report	Solid D	November 5, 2025
Inside Elections	Solid D	March 7, 2025
Sabato's Crystal Ball	Safe D	July 15, 2025
The Economist	Safe D	May 6, 2026

==== Post-primary endorsements ====
Luz Rivas (D)

Organizations

- Jewish Democratic Council of America

==== Fundraising ====
Campaign finance reports as of May 13, 2026
Candidate	Raised	Spent	Cash on hand
Luz Rivas (D)	$591,478	$491,886	$363,856
Angélica María Dueñas (D)	$29,617	$24,004	$5,516
Source: Federal Election Commission

==== Results ====
2026 California's 29th congressional district election
Party	Candidate	Votes	%	±%
Democratic	Luz Rivas (incumbent)			
Democratic	Angélica María Dueñas			
Total votes				

== District 30 ==
2026 California's 30th congressional district election
- Reporting: 98% as of Nov 10 at 10:12 AM PST
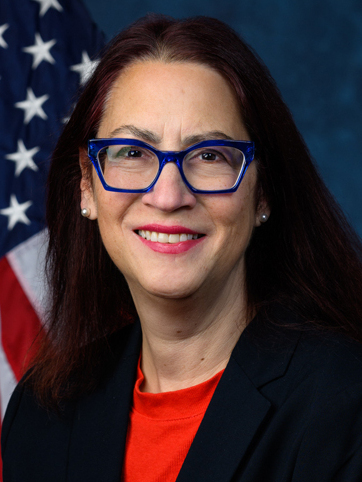

Candidate	Laura Friedman	Scott Meyers
Party	Democratic	Republican
Popular vote	198,721	57,584
Percentage	77.5%	22.5%
U.S. Representative before election
Laura Friedman
Democratic
Elected U.S. Representative
Laura Friedman
Democratic

California's 30th congressional district boundary from the 2026 elections Interactive map version

The incumbent is Democrat Laura Friedman, who was elected with 68.4% of the vote in 2024.

=== Primary ===
==== Advanced to general ====
- Laura Friedman (Democratic), incumbent U.S. representative
- Scott Alan Meyers (Republican), attorney

==== Eliminated in primary ====
- John Armenian (no party preference), aerospace entrepreneur
- Dennis Feitosa (Republican), YouTube content creator
- Pini Herman (Democratic), businessman
- Joel Lava (Democratic), activist
- Cameron Tennyson (Democratic), movie studio clerk

==== Endorsements ====
Laura Friedman (D)

Labor unions

- California Federation of Labor Unions
- National Union of Healthcare Workers

Organizations

- AIPAC
- California Environmental Voters
- Center for Biological Diversity Action Fund
- Democratic Majority for Israel
- East Area Progressive Democrats
- Elect Democratic Women
- Giffords
- Jewish Democratic Council of America
- J Street
- Joint Action Committee for Political Affairs
- League of Conservation Voters Action Fund
- National Women's Political Caucus
- Planned Parenthood Action Fund
- Sierra Club
- Stonewall Young Democrats
- Vote Mama

Political parties

- California Democratic Party
- Los Angeles County Democratic Party

==== Fundraising ====
Campaign finance reports as of May 13, 2026
Candidate	Raised	Spent	Cash on hand
John Armenian (I)	$115,543	$107,207	$8,336
Dennis Feitosa (R)	$13,358	$8,632	$220
Laura Friedman (D)	$749,342	$610,924	$435,166
Lester Herman (D)	$28,505	$29,036	$204
Joel Lava (D)	$9,442	$1,272	$9,442
Nick Melvoin (D)	$5,334	$70,820	$147,179
Scott Meyers (R)	$57,869	$45,315	$12,554
Cameron Tennyson (D)	$10,005	$6,808	$3,197
Source: Federal Election Commission

==== Results ====
Primary results
Party	Candidate	Votes	%
Democratic	Laura Friedman (incumbent)	102,384	52.68
Republican	Scott Alan Meyers	32,216	16.58
Democratic	Cameron Tennyson	26,756	13.77
No party preference	John Armenian	10,341	5.32
Republican	Dennis Feitosa	9,084	4.67
Democratic	Joel Lava	8,210	4.22
Democratic	Pini Herman	5,360	2.76
Total votes		194,351	100.0

=== General election ===
==== Predictions ====
Source	Ranking	As of
Decision Desk HQ	Safe D	July 14, 2026
The Cook Political Report	Solid D	November 5, 2025
Inside Elections	Solid D	March 7, 2025
Sabato's Crystal Ball	Safe D	July 15, 2025
The Economist	Safe D	May 6, 2026

==== Fundraising ====
Campaign finance reports as of May 13, 2026
Candidate	Raised	Spent	Cash on hand
Laura Friedman (D)	$749,342	$610,924	$435,166
Scott Meyers (R)	$57,869	$45,315	$12,554
Source: Federal Election Commission

==== Results ====
2026 California's 30th congressional district election
Party	Candidate	Votes	%	±%
Democratic	Laura Friedman (incumbent)			
Republican	Scott Meyers			
Total votes				

== District 31 ==
2026 California's 31st congressional district election
- Reporting: 98% as of Nov 10 at 10:12 AM PST
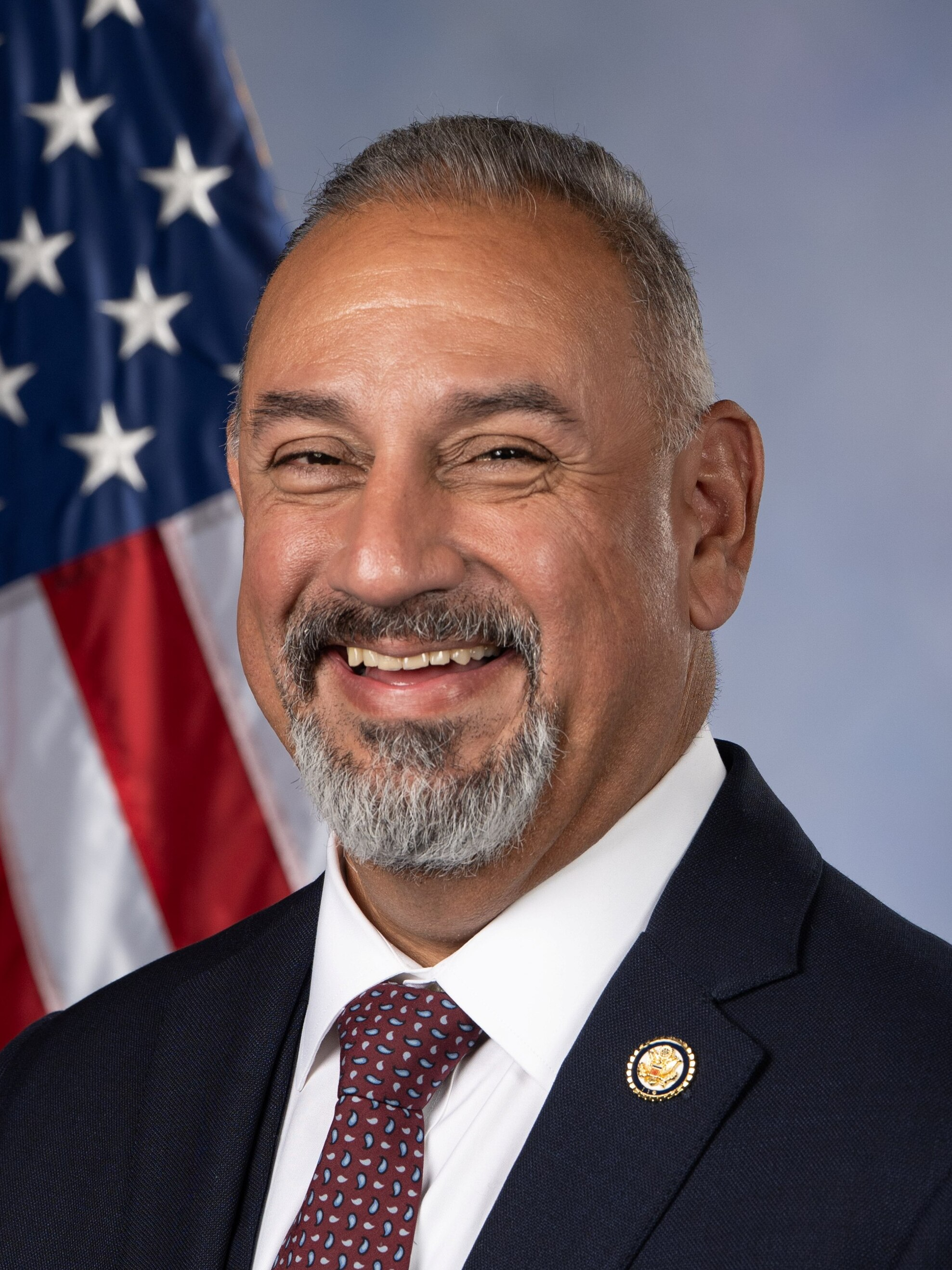

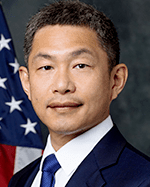
Candidate	Gil Cisneros	Eric Ching
Party	Democratic	Republican
Popular vote	155,440	79,282
Percentage	66.2%	33.8%
U.S. Representative before election
Gil Cisneros
Democratic
Elected U.S. Representative
Gil Cisneros
Democratic

California's 31st congressional district boundary from the 2026 elections Interactive map version

The incumbent is Democrat Gil Cisneros, who was elected with 59.7% of the vote in 2024.

=== Primary ===
==== Advanced to general ====
- Eric Ching (Republican), former Walnut city councilor (2012–2024) and runner-up for the 38th district in 2022 and 2024
- Gil Cisneros (Democratic), incumbent U.S. representative

==== Eliminated in primary ====
- Erskine Levi (Republican), retired teacher

==== Endorsements ====
Eric Ching (R)

Political parties

- California Republican Party
Gil Cisneros (D)

Labor unions

- California Federation of Labor Unions
- National Union of Healthcare Workers

Organizations

- AIPAC
- California Environmental Voters
- Giffords
- Jewish Democratic Council of America
- J Street
- League of Conservation Voters Action Fund
- Planned Parenthood Action Fund
- Sierra Club
- Stonewall Democratic Club

Political parties

- California Democratic Party

==== Fundraising ====
Campaign finance reports as of May 13, 2026
Candidate	Raised	Spent	Cash on hand
Eric Ching (R)	$67,387	$48,721	$58,907
Gil Cisneros (D)	$565,877	$426,004	$179,949
Source: Federal Election Commission

==== Results ====
Primary results
Party	Candidate	Votes	%
Democratic	Gil Cisneros (incumbent)	94,805	61.06
Republican	Eric Ching	36,999	23.83
Republican	Erskine Levi	23,449	15.10
Total votes		155,253	100.0

=== General election ===
==== Predictions ====
Source	Ranking	As of
Decision Desk HQ	Safe D	July 14, 2026
The Cook Political Report	Solid D	November 5, 2025
Inside Elections	Solid D	March 7, 2025
Sabato's Crystal Ball	Safe D	July 15, 2025
The Economist	Safe D	May 6, 2026

==== Fundraising ====
Campaign finance reports as of May 13, 2026
Candidate	Raised	Spent	Cash on hand
Gil Cisneros (D)	$565,877	$426,004	$179,949
Eric Ching (R)	$67,387	$48,721	$58,907
Source: Federal Election Commission

==== Results ====
2026 California's 31st congressional district election
Party	Candidate	Votes	%	±%
Democratic	Gil Cisneros (incumbent)			
Republican	Eric Ching			
Total votes				

== District 32 ==
2026 California's 32nd congressional district election
- Reporting: 93% as of Nov 10 at 10:12 AM PST
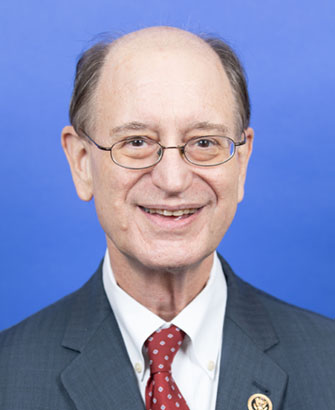

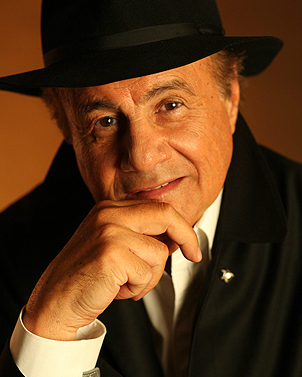
Candidate	Brad Sherman	Larry Thompson
Party	Democratic	Republican
Popular vote	174,262	82,755
Percentage	67.8%	32.2%
U.S. Representative before election
Brad Sherman
Democratic
Elected U.S. Representative
Brad Sherman
Democratic

California's 32nd congressional district boundary from the 2026 elections Interactive map version

The incumbent is Democrat Brad Sherman, who was reelected with 66.2% of the vote in 2024.

=== Primary ===
==== Advanced to general ====
- Brad Sherman (Democratic), incumbent U.S. representative
- Larry Thompson (Republican), talent manager, runner-up for this district in 2024 and independent candidate for the 37th district in 2020

==== Eliminated in primary ====
- Chris Ahuja (Democratic), actor and candidate for this district in 2024
- Dory Benami (Democratic), businessman
- Jake Levine (Democratic), former senior director for Climate & Energy at the National Security Council and son of former U.S. representative Mel Levine
- Marena Lin (Democratic), climate scientist
- Josh Sautter (Democratic), Encino neighborhood councilor from Area 1 (2023–present)
- Doug Smith (no party preference), television stage manager
- Anna Wilding (Democratic), filmmaker

==== Withdrawn ====
- Jake Rakov (Democratic), communications consultant and former deputy communications director for incumbent Brad Sherman

==== Endorsements ====
Chris Ahuja (D)

Organizations

- Progressive Victory
- Track AIPAC
Jake Levine (D)

U.S. representatives

- Henry Waxman, former CA-33 (1975–2015)
- Howard Berman, former CA-28 (1983–2013)

Organizations

- California College Democrats
- California Environmental Voters
- California Young Democrats
- Center for Biological Diversity Action Fund
- J Street PAC
- League of Conservation Voters
- Los Angeles County Young Democrats
- Our Revolution

Newspapers

- La Opinión
Brad Sherman (D)

Statewide officials

- Gavin Newsom, governor of California (2019–present)

U.S. senators

- Adam Schiff, California (2024–present)
- Alex Padilla, California (2021–present)
- Cory Booker, New Jersey (2013–present)

U.S. representatives

- Nancy Pelosi, CA-11 (1987–present) and former speaker of the House (2007–2011, 2019–2023)
- All 42 other Democratic U.S. representatives from California
- Jasmine Crockett, TX-30 (2023–present)

Labor unions

- California Federation of Labor Unions

Organizations

- AIPAC
- Democratic Majority for Israel
- Jewish Democratic Council of America
- Planned Parenthood Action Fund

Political parties

- California Democratic Party
Larry Thompson (R)

Political parties

- California Republican Party

==== Fundraising ====
Italics indicate a withdrawn candidate.

Campaign finance reports as of May 13, 2026
Candidate	Raised	Spent	Cash on hand
Chris Ahuja (D) (Note: As last reported on March 31, 2026)	$40,886	$19,259	$4,269
Dory Benami (D)	$53,272	$31,048	$22,224
Jake Levine (D)	$2,348,148	$1,582,588	$765,560
Jake Rakov (D)	$583,940	$583,940	$0
Josh Sautter (D) (Note: As last reported on March 31, 2026)	$31,028	$370	$24,990
Brad Sherman (D)	$1,749,552	$843,616	$4,827,881
Larry Thompson (R)	$15,251	$14,278	$972
Anna Wilding (D)	$13,356	$12,782	$773
Marena Lin (D)	$21,668	$15,043	$9,096
Source: Federal Election Commission

==== Results ====
Primary results
Party	Candidate	Votes	%
Democratic	Brad Sherman (incumbent)	76,755	36.77
Republican	Larry Thompson	68,295	32.72
Democratic	Jake Levine	31,688	15.18
Democratic	Marena Lin	13,215	6.33
Democratic	Chris Ahuja	8,718	4.18
Democratic	Anna Wilding	4,288	2.05
Democratic	Dory Benami	2,283	1.09
Democratic	Josh Sautter	2,017	0.97
No party preference	Doug Smith	1,458	0.70
Total votes		208,717	100.0

=== General election ===
==== Predictions ====
Source	Ranking	As of
Decision Desk HQ	Safe D	July 14, 2026
The Cook Political Report	Solid D	November 5, 2025
Inside Elections	Solid D	March 7, 2025
Sabato's Crystal Ball	Safe D	July 15, 2025
The Economist	Safe D	May 6, 2026

==== Fundraising ====
Campaign finance reports as of May 13, 2026
Candidate	Raised	Spent	Cash on hand
Brad Sherman (D)	$2,116,724	$1,805,207	$4,233,461
Larry Thompson (R)	$181,350	$181,350	$0
Source: Federal Election Commission

==== Results ====
2026 California's 32nd congressional district election
Party	Candidate	Votes	%	±%
Democratic	Brad Sherman (incumbent)			
Republican	Larry Thompson			
Total votes				

== District 33 ==
2026 California's 33rd congressional district election
- Reporting: 96% as of Nov 10 at 10:12 AM PST
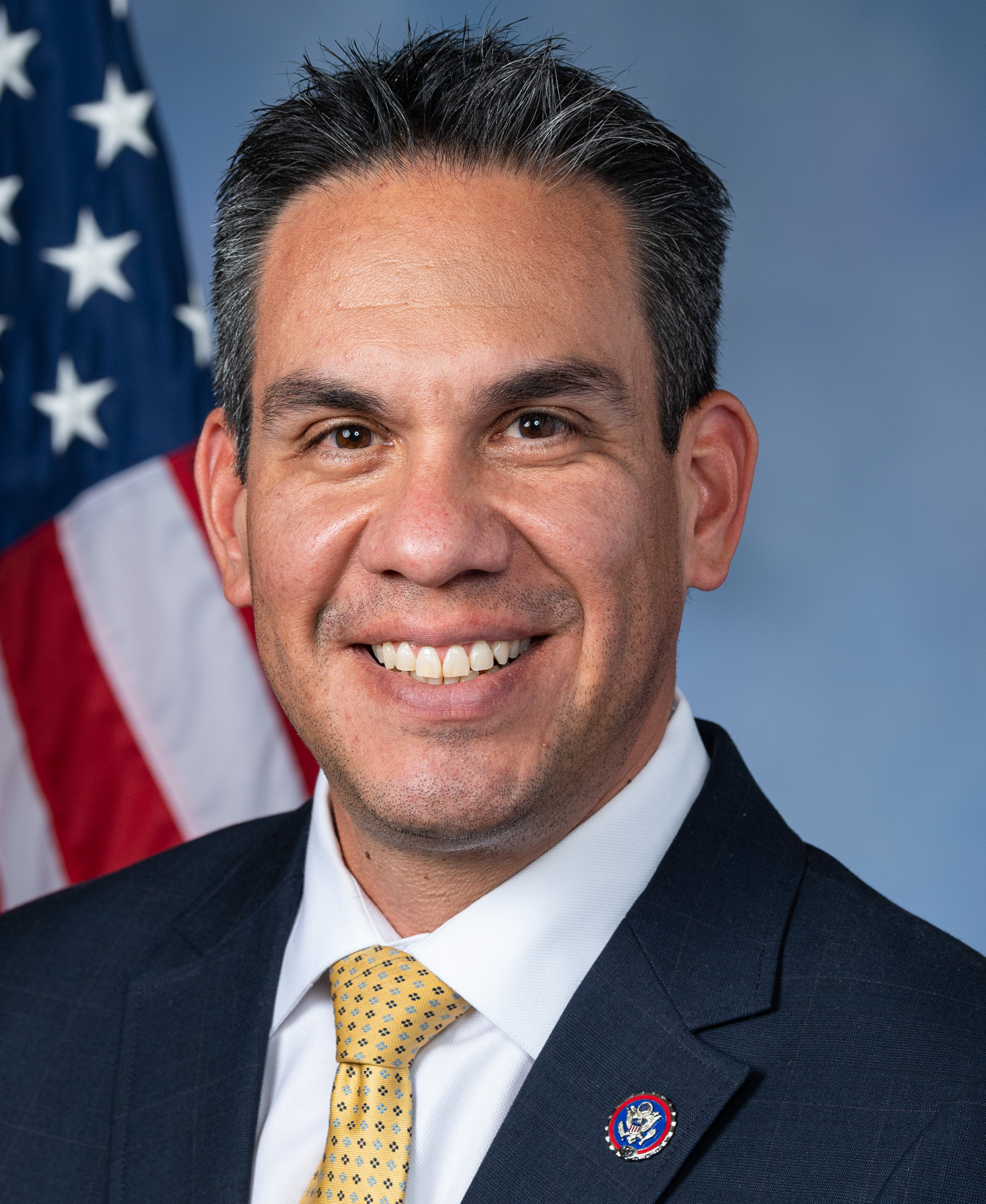

Candidate	Pete Aguilar	Stephanie Vargas
Party	Democratic	Republican
Popular vote	135,840	61,528
Percentage	68.8%	31.2%
U.S. Representative before election
Pete Aguilar
Democratic
Elected U.S. Representative
Pete Aguilar
Democratic

California's 33rd congressional district boundary from the 2026 elections Interactive map version

The incumbent is Democrat Pete Aguilar, who was reelected with 58.8% of the vote in 2024.

=== Primary ===
==== Advanced to general ====
- Pete Aguilar (Democratic), incumbent U.S. representative
- Stephanie Vargas (Republican), former Chief Deputy City Clerk of Colton (2024–2026)

==== Eliminated in primary ====
- Antonis P. Christodoulou (Democratic), law clerk
- Tom Herman (Republican), pastor
- Ernest "Ernie" Richter (Republican), retired mechanic
- Ling Ling Shi (no party preference), author
- Eugene Weems (Republican)

==== Endorsements ====
Pete Aguilar (D)

Labor unions

- California Federation of Labor Unions
- National Union of Healthcare Workers

Organizations

- AIPAC
- California Environmental Voters
- Giffords
- Jewish Democratic Council of America
- J Street
- Joint Action Committee for Political Affairs
- League of Conservation Voters Action Fund
- Planned Parenthood Action Fund
- Population Connection

Political parties

- California Democratic Party
Antonis Christodoulou (D)

Organizations

- Inland Empire Democratic Socialists of America

==== Fundraising ====
Campaign finance reports as of May 13, 2026
Candidate	Raised	Spent	Cash on hand
Pete Aguilar (D)	$4,194,305	$3,503,428	$3,339,948
Antonis Christodoulou (D)	$4,705	$2,013	$2,692
Ernest Richter (R)	$28,310	$27,857	$67
Eugene Weems (R)	$54,877	$52,697	$2,180
Source: Federal Election Commission

==== Results ====
Primary results
Party	Candidate	Votes	%
Democratic	Pete Aguilar (incumbent)	64,068	53.54
Republican	Stephanie M. Vargas	20,952	17.51
Republican	Tom Herman	13,623	11.38
Democratic	Antonis P. Christodoulou	9,013	7.53
Republican	Eugene Weems	5,491	4.59
Republican	Ernest "Ernie" Richter	5,368	4.49
No party preference	Ling Ling Shi	1,152	0.96
Total votes		119,667	100.0

=== General election ===
==== Predictions ====
Source	Ranking	As of
Decision Desk HQ	Safe D	July 14, 2026
The Cook Political Report	Solid D	November 5, 2025
Inside Elections	Solid D	March 7, 2025
Sabato's Crystal Ball	Safe D	July 15, 2025
The Economist	Safe D	May 6, 2026

==== Fundraising ====
Campaign finance reports as of May 13, 2026
Candidate	Raised	Spent	Cash on hand
Pete Aguilar (D)	$4,194,305	$3,503,428	$3,339,948
Stephanie Vargas (R)	$0	$0	$0
Source: Federal Election Commission

==== Results ====
2026 California's 33rd congressional district election
Party	Candidate	Votes	%	±%
Democratic	Pete Aguilar (incumbent)			
Republican	Stephanie Vargas			
Total votes				

== District 34 ==
2026 California's 34th congressional district election
- Reporting: 98% as of Nov 10 at 10:12 AM PST

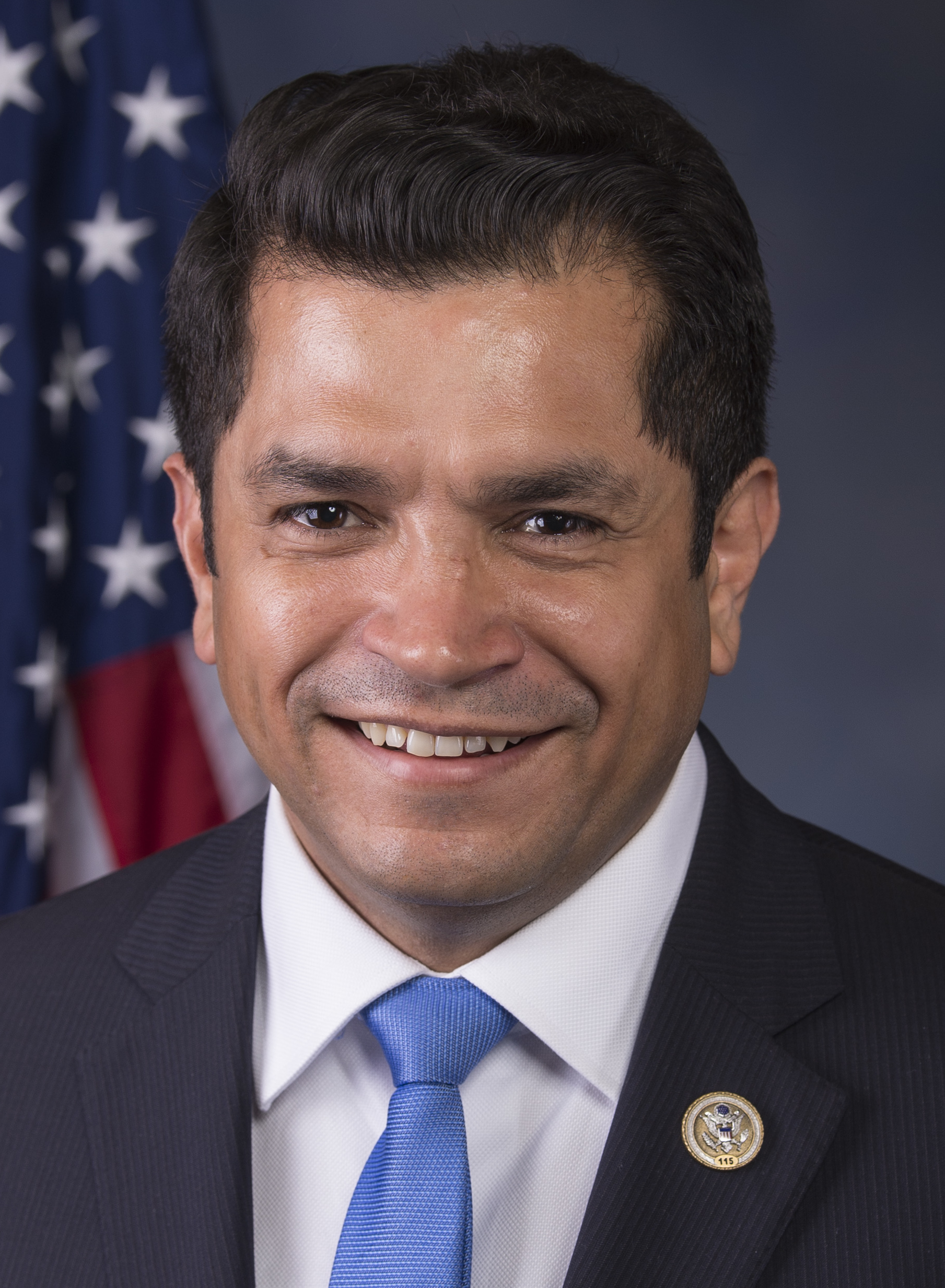
Candidate	Angela Gonzales-Torres	Jimmy Gomez
Party	Democratic	Democratic
Popular vote	106,298	65,061
Percentage	62.0%	38.0%
U.S. Representative before election
Jimmy Gomez
Democratic
Elected U.S. Representative
Angela Gonzales-Torres
Democratic

California's 34th congressional district boundary from the 2026 elections Interactive map version

The incumbent is Democrat Jimmy Gomez, who was reelected with 55.6% of the vote in 2024.

=== Primary ===
==== Advanced to general ====
- Jimmy Gomez (Democratic), incumbent U.S. representative
- Angela Gonzales-Torres (Democratic), former at-large Historic Highland Park neighborhood councilor (2023–2025)

==== Eliminated in primary ====
- Loren Colin (no party preference), marketing business owner and former Silver Lake neighborhood councilor (2006–2009)
- Arthur Dixon (Democratic), community organizer
- Calvin Lee (Republican), global healthcare entrepreneur and candidate for this district in 2024
- Rob Lucero (Democratic), political consultant and Republican candidate for U.S. Senate in 2022

==== Declined ====
- David Kim, former MacArthur Park neighborhood council board member (2020–2023) and runner-up for this seat in 2020, 2022, and 2024 (endorsed Gonzales-Torres)

==== Endorsements ====
Jimmy Gomez (D)

Labor unions

- California Federation of Labor Unions

Organizations

- AIPAC
- California Environmental Voters
- Democratic Majority for Israel
- End Citizens United
- Giffords
- Leading the Future
- League of Conservation Voters
- Planned Parenthood Action Fund
- Sierra Club
- Stonewall Democratic Club

Political parties

- California Democratic Party
Angela Gonzales-Torres (D)

Local officials

- David Kim, former MacArthur Park neighborhood council board member (2020–2023) and runner-up for this seat in 2020, 2022, and 2024
- Kenneth Mejia, Los Angeles City Controller (2022–present), candidate for this seat in 2016 and 2017 and runner-up in 2018

Individuals

- Alexandra Rojas, political commentator and executive director of Justice Democrats

Organizations

- IfNotNow LA
- Justice Democrats
- Knock LA
- National Women's Political Caucus
- Track AIPAC

Political parties

- California Working Families Party
Declined to endorse

Organizations

- East Area Progressive Democrats

==== Fundraising ====
Campaign finance reports as of May 13, 2026
Candidate	Raised	Spent	Cash on hand
Loren Colin (I)	$9,050	$5,561	$3,489
Arthur Dixon (D)	$16,991	$4,500	$12,491
Jimmy Gomez (D)	$1,075,257	$370,488	$793,528
Angela Gonzales-Torres (D)	$195,083	$157,860	$37,223
Rob Lucero (D)	$180,074	$166,422	$4,424
Source: Federal Election Commission

==== Results ====
Primary results
Party	Candidate	Votes	%
Democratic	Jimmy Gomez (incumbent)	54,993	45.99
Democratic	Angela Gonzales-Torres	36,708	30.70
Republican	Calvin Lee	16,321	13.65
Democratic	Robert George Lucero Jr.	6,144	5.14
Democratic	Arthur Dixon	4,103	3.43
No party preference	Loren Colin	1,316	1.10
Total votes		119,585	100.0

=== General election ===
==== Campaign ====
Although Gomez is part of the Congressional Progressive Caucus, his acceptance of funding from the cryptocurrency industry and from American Israel Public Affairs Committee (AIPAC) led most progressive organizations to instead endorse Gonzales-Torres in the primary and general, including the Justice Democrats, Our Revolution, the California Working Families Party and Los Angeles Democratic Socialists of America.

In August, the House Ethics Committee began an inquiry into whether Gomez had engaged in sexual misconduct. The inquiry followed one into Eric Swalwell, with whom Gomez was personal friends and who had appointed Gomez chair of his gubernatorial campaign before Swalwell suspended the campaign and resigned from Congress amid criminal investigations into alleged rape and sexual misconduct. One former Gomez staffer accused him of sexual assault. Gomez denied any nonconsensual conduct and said that he had made personal mistakes outside his marriage. Gonzales-Torres criticized a "culture in Congress in which men abuse women" and said Gomez should withdraw.

==== Predictions ====
Source	Ranking	As of
Decision Desk HQ	Safe D	July 14, 2026
The Cook Political Report	Solid D	November 5, 2025
Inside Elections	Solid D	March 7, 2025
Sabato's Crystal Ball	Safe D	July 15, 2025
The Economist	Safe D	May 6, 2026

==== Post-primary endorsements ====
Angela Gonzales-Torres (D)

U.S. representatives

- Ro Khanna, CA-17 (2017–present)

Party officials

- David Hogg, former vice chair of the Democratic National Committee (2025)

Labor unions

- National Union of Healthcare Workers

Organizations

- Council on American–Islamic Relations Action
- East Area Progressive Democrats
- Jane Fonda Climate PAC
- Leaders We Deserve
- Los Angeles Democratic Socialists of America
- National Women's Political Caucus
- Our Revolution
- Peace Action

==== Fundraising ====
Campaign finance reports as of October 14, 2026
Candidate	Raised	Spent	Cash on hand
Jimmy Gomez (D)	$1,336,235	$796,599	$628,395
Angela Gonzales-Torres (D)	$509,752	$404,933	$104,818
Source: Federal Election Commission

==== Polling ====
Poll source	Date(s) administered	Sample size (Note: Key: A – all adults RV – registered voters LV – likely voters V – unclear)	Margin of error	Jimmy Gomez (D)	Angela Gonzales-Torres (D)	Other	Undecided
University of Southern California	October 16–24, 2026	423 (LV)	± 4.8%	45% (Note: With voters who lean towards a given candidate)	51%	4% (Note: "I do not plan to vote in this election/I will skip this contest" with 4%)	–
University of Southern California	October 16–24, 2026	423 (LV)	± 4.8%	34%	34%	2% (Note: "I do not plan to vote in this election" with 3%)	30%
Center for Strategic Politics (Note: Poll sponsored by Gonzales-Torres's campaign)	October 8–12, 2026	416 (LV)	± 4.8%	38%	48%	–	14%
Upswing Research (D) (Note: Poll sponsored by the Guardrails Alliance, which opposes Gomez's campaign)	September 1–5, 2026	403 (LV)	± 4.9%	38%	41%	–	20%

==== Results ====
2026 California's 34th congressional district election
Party	Candidate	Votes	%	±%
Democratic	Angela Gonzales-Torres			
Democratic	Jimmy Gomez (incumbent)			
Total votes				

== District 35 ==
2026 California's 35th congressional district election
- Reporting: 89% as of Nov 10 at 10:12 AM PST
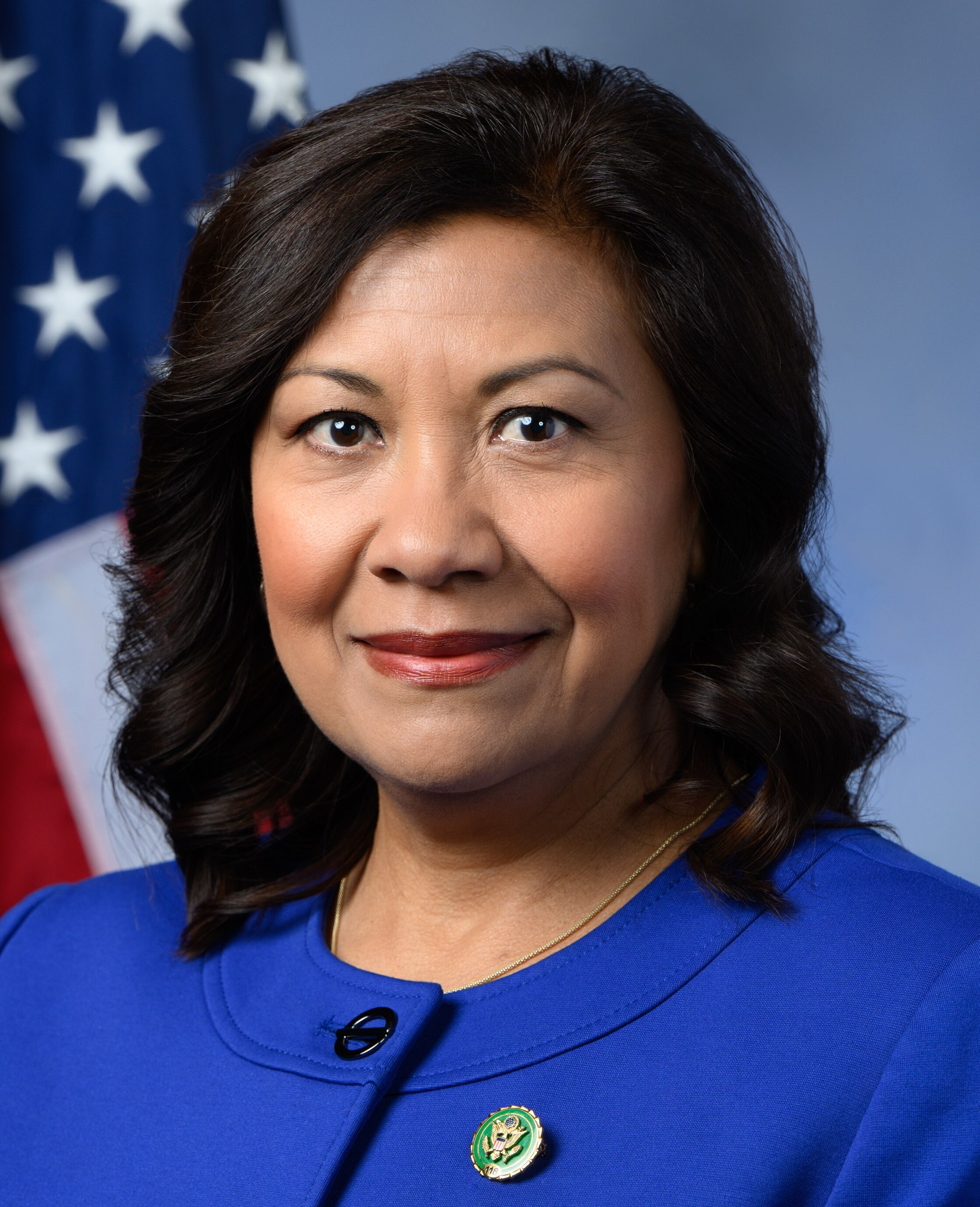

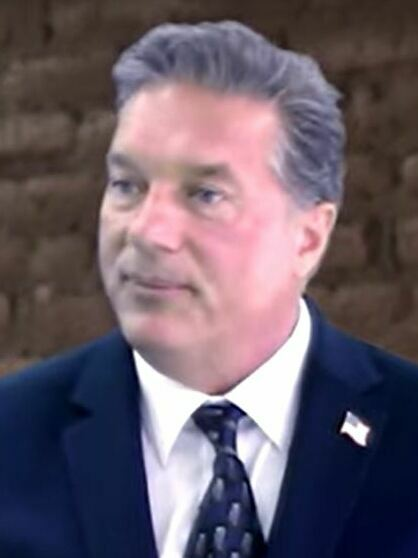
Candidate	Norma Torres	Mike Cargile
Party	Democratic	Republican
Popular vote	126,085	61,280
Percentage	67.3%	32.7%
U.S. Representative before election
Norma Torres
Democratic
Elected U.S. Representative
Norma Torres
Democratic

California's 35th congressional district boundary from the 2026 elections Interactive map version

The incumbent is Democrat Norma Torres, who was reelected with 58.4% of the vote in 2024.

=== Primary ===
==== Advanced to general ====
- Mike Cargile (Republican), independent filmmaker and runner-up for this district in 2020, 2022, and 2024
- Norma Torres (Democratic), incumbent U.S. representative

==== Endorsements ====
Norma Torres (D)

Labor unions

- California Federation of Labor Unions
- National Union of Healthcare Workers

Organizations

- AIPAC
- California Environmental Voters
- Democratic Majority for Israel
- Planned Parenthood Action Fund
- Population Connection
- Reproductive Freedom for All

Political parties

- California Democratic Party
- Los Angeles County Democratic Party

==== Fundraising ====
Campaign finance reports as of May 13, 2026
Candidate	Raised	Spent	Cash on hand
Mike Cargile (R)	$4,495	$2,324	$2,642
Norma Torres (D)	$629,500	$544,667	$388,148
Source: Federal Election Commission

==== Results ====
Primary results
Party	Candidate	Votes	%
Democratic	Norma J. Torres (incumbent)	76,029	59.54
Republican	Mike Cargile	51,641	40.44
No party preference	Deborah Kristianto (write-in)	27	0.02
Total votes		127,697	100.0

=== General election ===
==== Predictions ====
Source	Ranking	As of
Decision Desk HQ	Safe D	July 14, 2026
The Cook Political Report	Solid D	November 5, 2025
Inside Elections	Solid D	March 7, 2025
Sabato's Crystal Ball	Safe D	July 15, 2025
The Economist	Safe D	May 6, 2026

==== Fundraising ====
Campaign finance reports as of May 13, 2026
Candidate	Raised	Spent	Cash on hand
Norma Torres (D)	$629,500	$544,667	$388,148
Mike Cargile (R)	$4,495	$2,324	$2,642
Source: Federal Election Commission

==== Results ====
2026 California's 35th congressional district election
Party	Candidate	Votes	%	±%
Democratic	Norma Torres (incumbent)			
Republican	Mike Cargile			
Total votes				

== District 36 ==
2026 California's 36th congressional district election
- Reporting: 98% as of Nov 10 at 10:12 AM PST
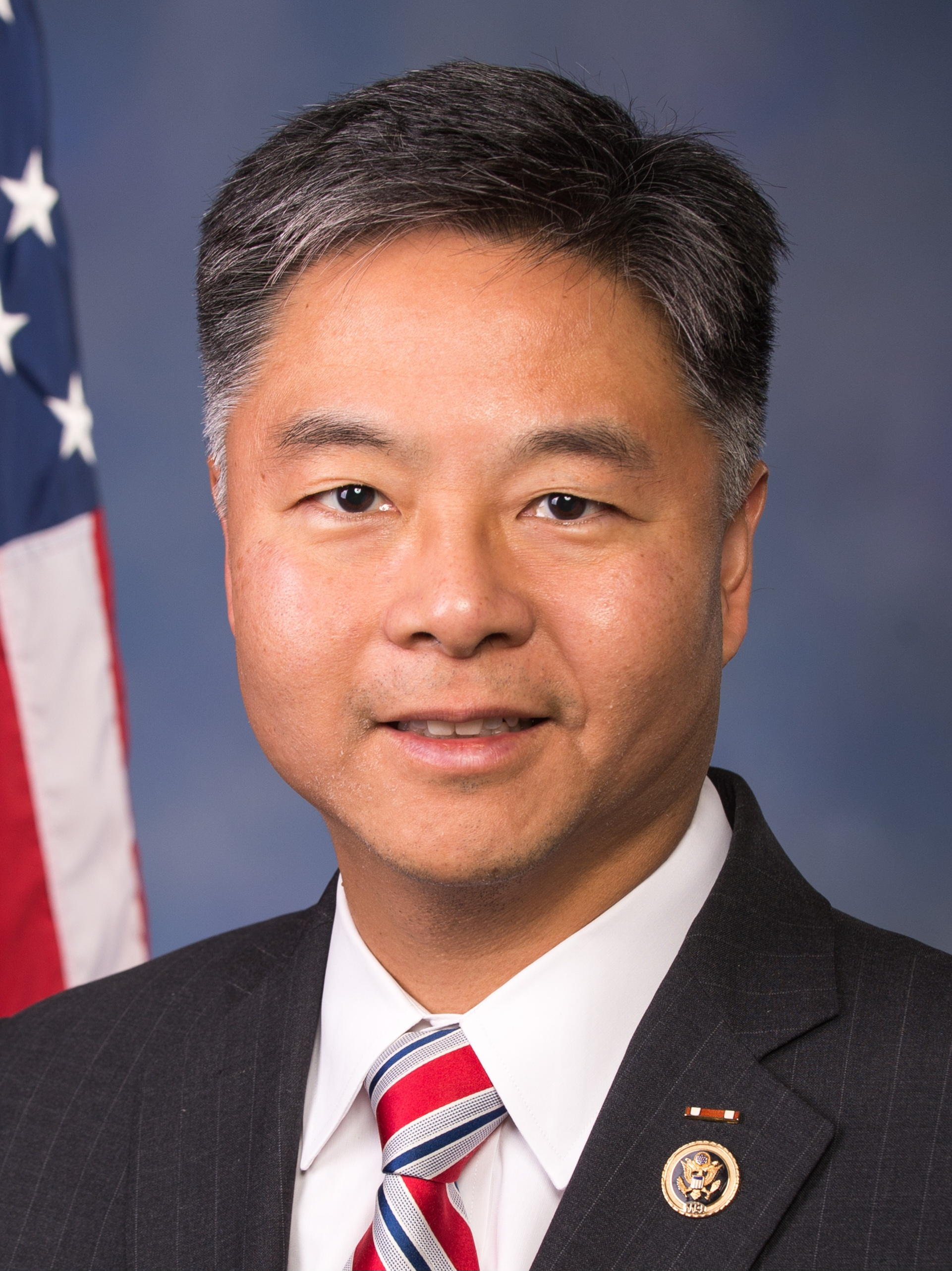

Candidate	Ted Lieu	Houston Brignano
Party	Democratic	Republican
Popular vote	220,025	81,883
Percentage	72.9%	27.1%
U.S. Representative before election
Ted Lieu
Democratic
Elected U.S. Representative
Ted Lieu
Democratic

California's 36th congressional district boundary from the 2026 elections Interactive map version

The incumbent is Democrat Ted Lieu, who was reelected with 68.7% of the vote in 2024.

=== Primary ===
==== Advanced to general ====
- Houston Brignano (Republican), technology executive
- Ted Lieu (Democratic), incumbent U.S. representative

==== Eliminated in primary ====
- Claire Ragge Anderson (no party preference), business owner
- Rustin Knudtson (Democratic), data engineer
- Frederick Reardon (Democratic), business development manager
- Marianne Shamma (Democratic), community advocate
- Melissa Toomim (Republican), investigative journalist, runner-up for this district in 2024 and candidate for the 32nd district in 2022

==== Endorsements ====
Ted Lieu (D)

Labor unions

- California Federation of Labor Unions
- National Union of Healthcare Workers

Organizations

- AIPAC
- California Environmental Voters
- Center for Biological Diversity Action Fund
- Jewish Democratic Council of America
- League of Conservation Voters Action Fund
- Planned Parenthood Action Fund
- Population Connection
- Sierra Club
- Stonewall Democratic Club

Political parties

- California Democratic Party
Marianne Shamma (D)

Organizations

- Track AIPAC

==== Fundraising ====
Campaign finance reports as of May 13, 2026
Candidate	Raised	Spent	Cash on hand
Rustin Knudtson (D)	$12,500	$0	$12,500
Ted Lieu (D)	$1,493,399	$1,211,263	$957,143
Claire Ragge Anderson (I)	$22,100	$22,629	$1,945
Marianne Shamma (D)	$4,648	$4,363	$285
Leah Toomim (R)	$30,989	$36,294	$0
Source: Federal Election Commission

==== Results ====
Primary results
Party	Candidate	Votes	%
Democratic	Ted W. Lieu (incumbent)	142,982	60.94
Republican	Houston Brignano	35,851	15.28
Republican	Melissa Toomim	30,653	13.06
Democratic	Marianne Shamma	17,000	7.24
Democratic	Rustin Knudtson	3,001	1.28
Democratic	Frederick Reardon	2,688	1.15
No party preference	Claire Anderson	2,470	1.11
Total votes		234,645	100.0

=== General election ===
==== Predictions ====
Source	Ranking	As of
Decision Desk HQ	Safe D	July 14, 2026
The Cook Political Report	Solid D	November 5, 2025
Inside Elections	Solid D	March 7, 2025
Sabato's Crystal Ball	Safe D	July 15, 2025
The Economist	Safe D	May 6, 2026

==== Post-primary endorsements ====
Houston Brignano (R)

Organizations

- Log Cabin Republicans

==== Fundraising ====
Campaign finance reports as of May 13, 2026
Candidate	Raised	Spent	Cash on hand
Ted Lieu (D)	$1,493,399	$1,211,263	$957,143
Houston Brignano (R)	$5,139	$4,338	$801
Source: Federal Election Commission

==== Results ====
2026 California's 36th congressional district election
Party	Candidate	Votes	%	±%
Democratic	Ted Lieu (incumbent)			
Republican	Houston Brignano			
Total votes				

== District 37 ==
2026 California's 37th congressional district election
- Reporting: 98% as of Nov 10 at 10:12 AM PST
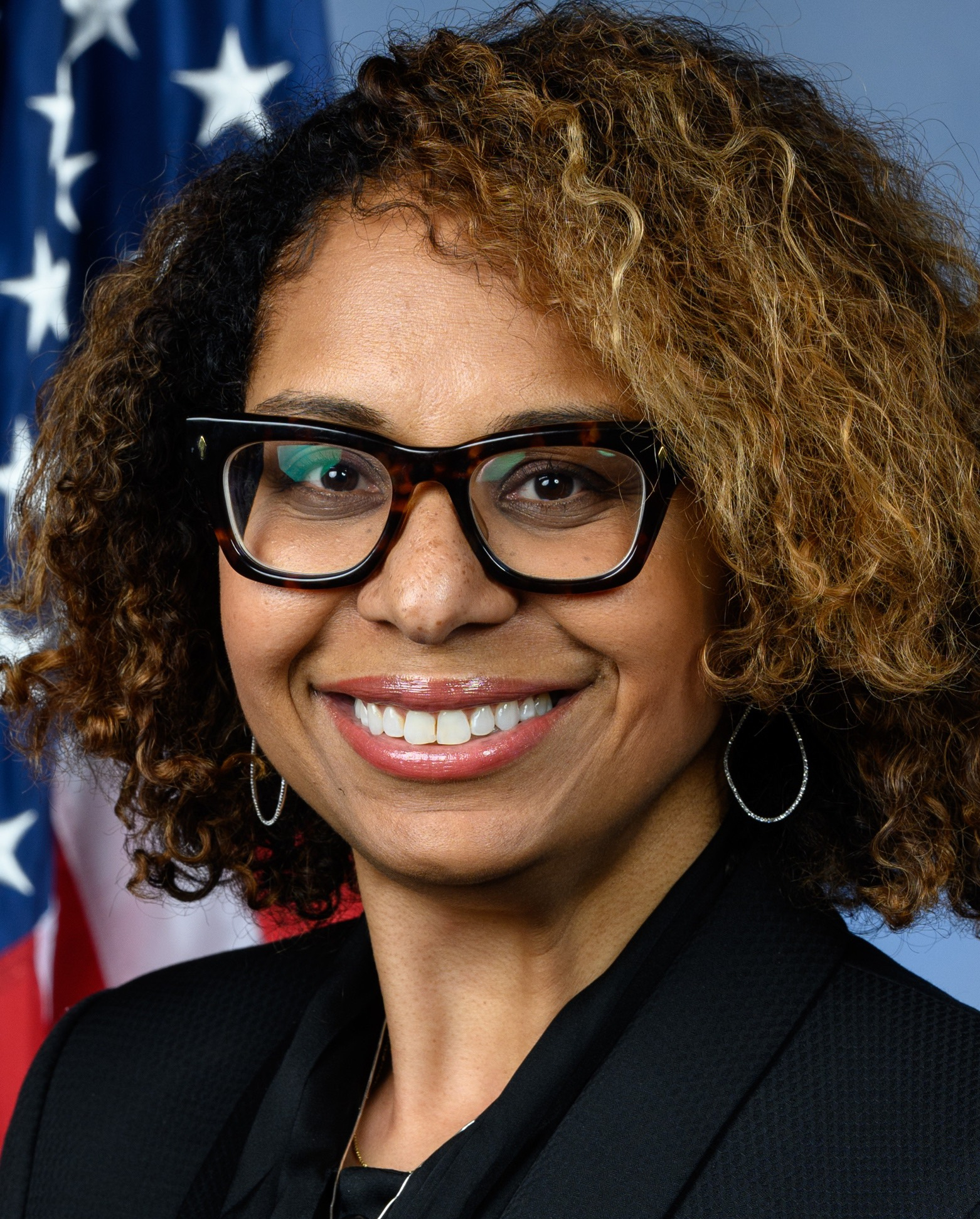

Candidate	Sydney Kamlager-Dove	Samantha Mota
Party	Democratic	Democratic
Popular vote	109,873	70,282
Percentage	61.0%	39.0%
U.S. Representative before election
Sydney Kamlager-Dove
Democratic
Elected U.S. Representative
Sydney Kamlager-Dove
Democratic

California's 37th congressional district boundary from the 2026 elections Interactive map version

The incumbent is Democrat Sydney Kamlager-Dove, who was reelected with 78.3% of the vote in 2024.

=== Primary ===
==== Advanced to general ====
- Sydney Kamlager-Dove (Democratic), incumbent U.S. representative
- Samantha Mota (Democratic), community activist

==== Eliminated in primary ====
- Ryan Duckett (Democratic), city commissioner
- Baltazar Fedalizo (Republican), lobbyist, candidate for this district in 2022 and write-in candidate in 2024
- Elizabeth Fenner (Democratic), community advocate
- Steven Hill (no party preference), retired peace officer
- Todd Lombardo (Democratic), business owner
- John Thompson Parker (Peace and Freedom), social justice advocate and perennial candidate
- Juan Rey (no party preference), metro train mechanic, runner-up for this district in 2024 and candidate for the 29th district in 2018

==== Endorsements ====
Baltazar Fedalizo (R)

Political parties

- California Republican Party
Sydney Kamlager-Dove (D)

Labor unions

- California Federation of Labor Unions
- National Union of Healthcare Workers

Organizations

- California Environmental Voters
- Center for Biological Diversity Action Fund
- Jewish Democratic Council of America
- J Street
- League of Conservation Voters Action Fund
- National Women's Political Caucus
- Planned Parenthood Action Fund
- Sierra Club
- Stonewall Democratic Club
- Vote Mama

Political parties

- California Democratic Party
Samantha Mota (D)

Organizations

- Feel the Bern San Fernando Valley
- Knock LA
- Progressive Voters Network

==== Fundraising ====
Campaign finance reports as of May 13, 2026
Candidate	Raised	Spent	Cash on hand
Sydney Kamlager-Dove (D)	$904,042	$632,438	$333,603
Todd Lombardo (D)	$88,599	$72,241	$16,064
Samantha Mota (D)	$449	$1,243	$0
Source: Federal Election Commission

==== Results ====
Primary results
Party	Candidate	Votes	%
Democratic	Sydney Kamlager-Dove (incumbent)	70,990	55.18
Democratic	Samantha Mota	15,019	11.67
Republican	Baltazar Fedalizo	13,773	10.70
Democratic	Ryan Duckett	8,410	6.54
Democratic	Elizabeth Fenner	7,238	5.63
Democratic	Todd Lombardo	4,696	3.65
Peace and Freedom	John Thompson Parker	4,005	3.11
No party preference	Juan Rey	2,470	1.92
No party preference	Steve Hill	2,059	1.60
Total votes		128,660	100.0

=== General election ===
==== Predictions ====
Source	Ranking	As of
Decision Desk HQ	Safe D	July 14, 2026
The Cook Political Report	Solid D	November 5, 2025
Inside Elections	Solid D	March 7, 2025
Sabato's Crystal Ball	Safe D	July 15, 2025
The Economist	Safe D	May 6, 2026

==== Fundraising ====
Campaign finance reports as of August 19, 2026
Candidate	Raised	Spent	Cash on hand
Sydney Kamlager-Dove (D)	$1,150,467	$1,026,975	$185,490
Samantha Mota (D)	$9,933	$8,292	$1,633
Source: Federal Election Commission

==== Results ====
2026 California's 37th congressional district election
Party	Candidate	Votes	%	±%
Democratic	Sydney Kamlager-Dove (incumbent)			
Democratic	Samantha Mota			
Total votes				

== District 38 ==
2026 California's 38th congressional district election
- Reporting: 96% as of Nov 10 at 10:12 AM PST
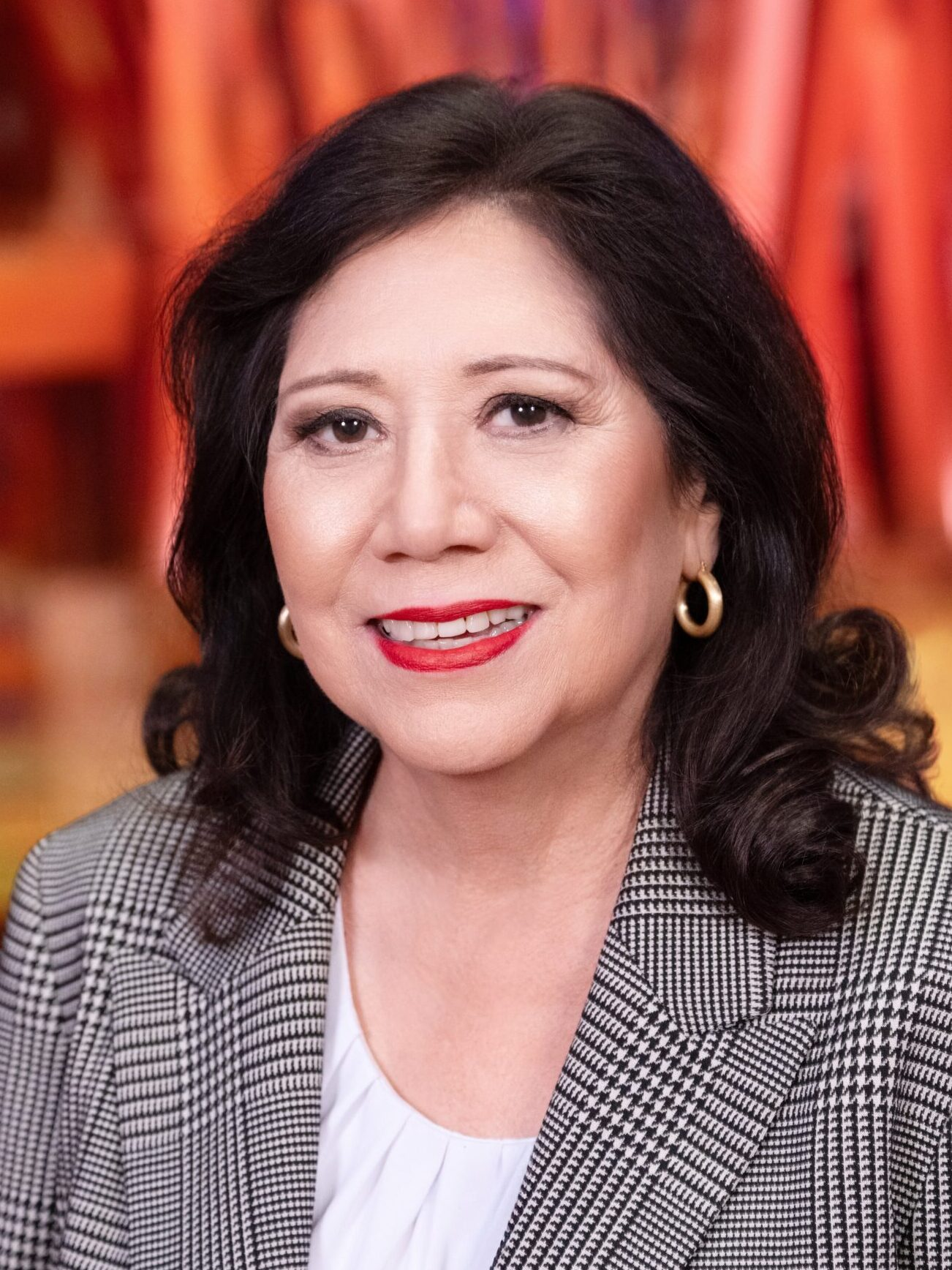

Candidate	Hilda Solis	Pedro Antonio Casas
Party	Democratic	Republican
Popular vote	141,180	67,991
Percentage	67.5%	32.5%
U.S. Representative before election
None (new seat)
Elected U.S. Representative
Hilda Solis
Democratic

California's 38th congressional district boundary from the 2026 elections Interactive map version

Due to redistricting this seat is open and has no incumbent.

=== Primary ===
==== Advanced to general ====
- Pedro Antonio Casas (Republican), psychologist and candidate for the 31st district in 2024
- Hilda Solis (Democratic), Los Angeles County supervisor from the 1st district and Chair of Los Angeles County (2014–present), former U.S. Secretary of Labor (2009–2013), and former U.S. representative from the 32nd district (2001–2009)

==== Eliminated in primary ====
- Erik Lutz (Democratic), Pico Rivera city councilor
- Monica Sánchez (Democratic), mayor pro-tem of Pico Rivera

==== Declined ====
- Linda Sánchez (Democratic), incumbent U.S. representative from the 41st (running in the 41st district, endorsed Monica Sánchez)

==== Endorsements ====
Monica Sánchez (D)

U.S. representatives

- Nanette Barragán, CA-44 (2017–present)
- Robin Kelly, IL-02 (2013–present)
- Linda Sánchez, CA-38 (2003–present)
- Norma Torres, CA-35 (2015–present)
Hilda Solis (D)

U.S. senators

- Adam Schiff, California (2024–present)

U.S. representatives

- Greg Casar, TX-35 (2023–present)
- Gil Cisneros, CA-39 (2019–2021), CA-31 (2025–present)
- Judy Chu, CA-28 (2009–present)
- Lou Correa, CA-46 (2017–present)
- Rosa DeLauro, CT-03 (1991–present)
- Laura Friedman, CA-30 (2025–present)
- Maxwell Frost, FL-10 (2023–present)
- Sylvia Garcia, TX-29 (2019–present)
- Robert Garcia, CA-42 (2023–present)
- Pramila Jayapal, WA-07 (2017–present)
- Doris Matsui, CA-07 (2005–present)
- Grace Napolitano, former CA-31 (1999–2025)
- Nancy Pelosi, former Speaker of the United States House of Representatives (2007–2011, 2019–2023) from CA-11 (1987–present)
- Luz Rivas, CA-29 (2025–present)
- Lucille Roybal-Allard, former CA-40 (1993–2023)
- Raul Ruiz, CA-25 (2013–present)
- Brad Sherman, CA-32 (1997–present)
- Mark Takano, CA-39 (2013–present)
- Derek Tran, CA-45 (2025–present)
- Maxine Waters, CA-43 (1991–present)
- George Whitesides, CA-27 (2025–present)

State legislators

- Lena Gonzalez, former majority leader of the California Senate (2024–2025) from SD-33 (2019–present)
- Robert Rivas, speaker of the California Assembly (2023–present) from AD-29 (2018–present)

Local officials

- Karen Bass, mayor of Los Angeles (2022–present)

Labor unions

- California Faculty Association
- California Federation of Labor Unions
- National Union of Healthcare Workers
- SEIU California
- SEIU United Healthcare Workers West

Organizations

- California Environmental Voters
- Congressional Progressive Caucus PAC
- National Women's Political Caucus
- PODER PAC

Political parties

- California Democratic Party

Newspapers

- La Opinión

==== Fundraising ====
Campaign finance reports as of May 13, 2026
Candidate	Raised	Spent	Cash on hand
Monica Sanchez (D)	$168,546	$156,754	$11,792
Hilda Solis (D)	$936,855	$448,269	$488,586
Source: Federal Election Commission

==== Results ====
Primary results
Party	Candidate	Votes	%
Democratic	Hilda Solis	65,369	47.62
Republican	Pedro Antonio Casas	49,196	35.84
Democratic	Monica M. Sanchez	18,268	13.31
Democratic	Erik Lutz	4,443	3.24
Total votes		137,276	100.0

=== General election ===
==== Predictions ====
Source	Ranking	As of
Decision Desk HQ	Safe D (flip)	July 14, 2026
The Cook Political Report	Solid D (flip)	November 5, 2025
Inside Elections	Solid D (flip)	March 7, 2025
Sabato's Crystal Ball	Safe D (flip)	July 15, 2025
The Economist	Safe D (flip)	May 6, 2026

==== Fundraising ====
Campaign finance reports as of May 13, 2026
Candidate	Raised	Spent	Cash on hand
Pedro Casas (R)	$0	$0	$0
Hilda Solis (D)	$936,855	$448,269	$488,586
Source: Federal Election Commission

==== Results ====
2026 California's 38th congressional district election
Party	Candidate	Votes	%	±%
Republican	Pedro Casas			
Democratic	Hilda Solis			
Total votes				

== District 39 ==
2026 California's 39th congressional district election
- Reporting: 61% as of Nov 9 at 5:56 PM PST
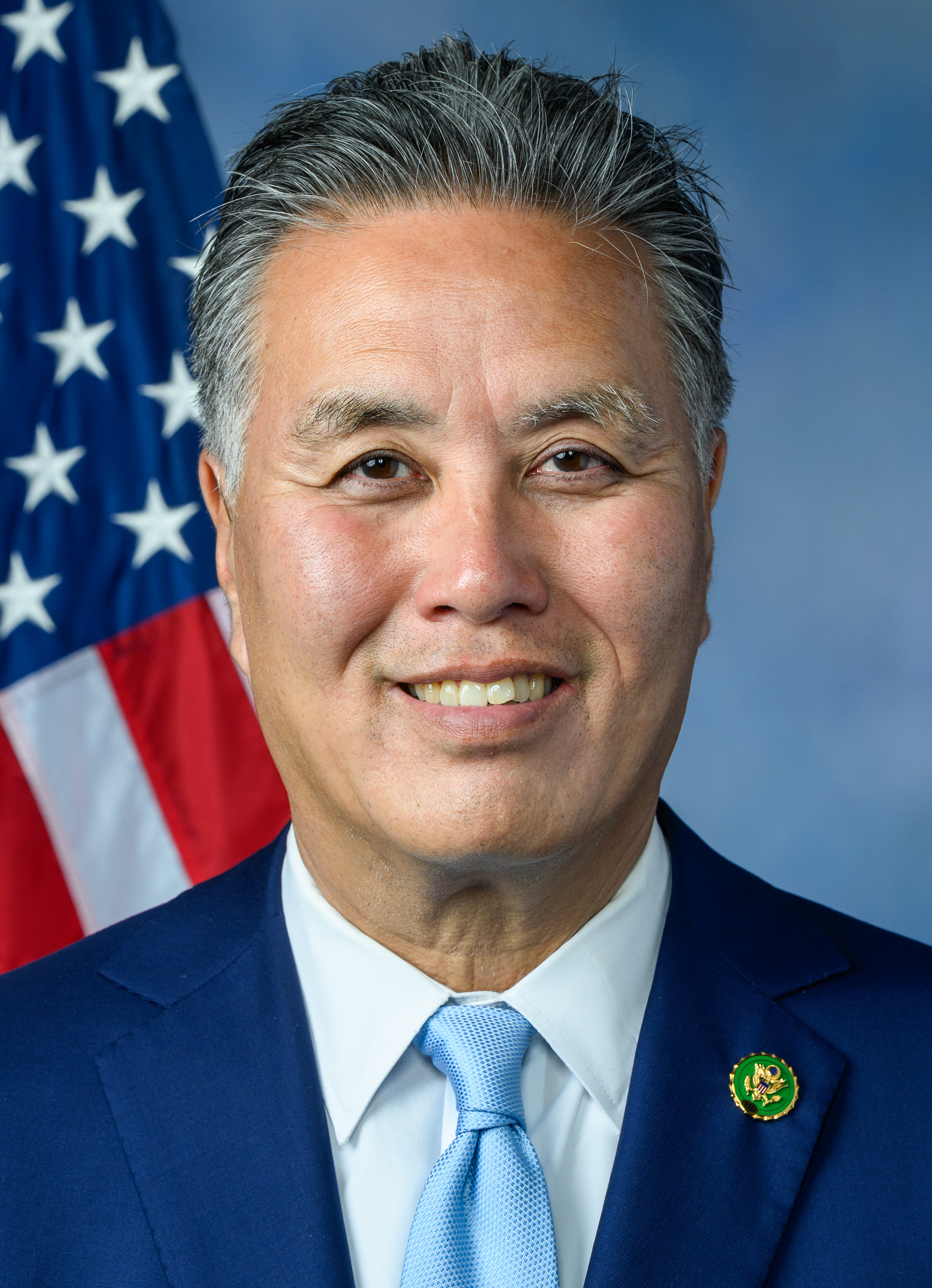

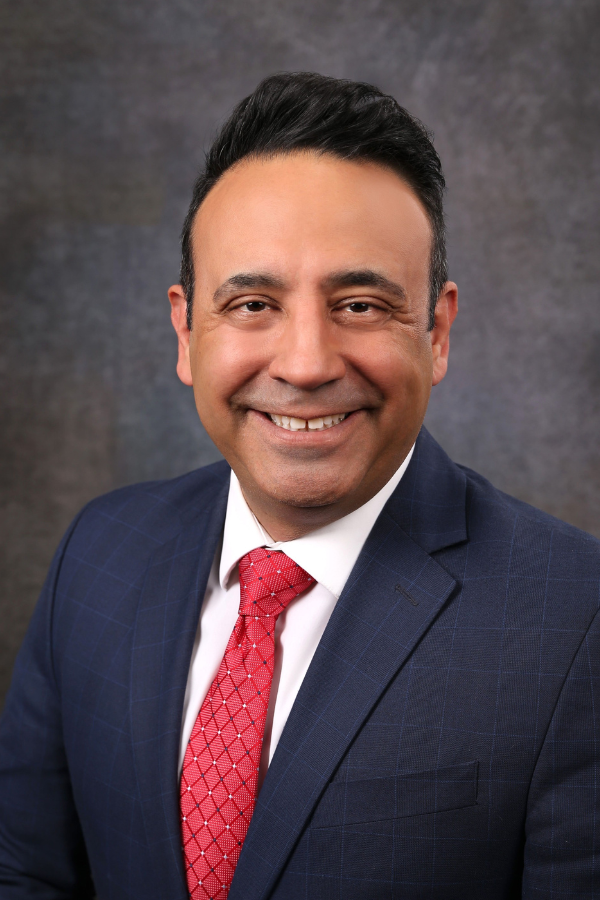
Candidate	Mark Takano	Steve Manos
Party	Democratic	Republican
Popular vote	81,158	40,062
Percentage	67.0%	33.0%
U.S. Representative before election
Mark Takano
Democratic
Elected U.S. Representative
Mark Takano
Democratic

California's 39th congressional district boundary from the 2026 elections Interactive map version

The incumbent is Democrat Mark Takano, who was reelected with 56.7% of the vote in 2024.

=== Primary ===
==== Advanced to general ====
- Steve Manos (Republican), Lake Elsinore city councilor
- Mark Takano (Democratic), incumbent U.S. representative

==== Endorsements ====
Mark Takano (D)

Labor unions

- California Federation of Labor Unions
- National Union of Healthcare Workers

Organizations

- California Environmental Voters
- Planned Parenthood Action Fund
- J Street
- Stonewall Democratic Club

Political parties

- California Democratic Party
Steve Manos (R)

Political parties

- California Republican Party

==== Fundraising ====
Campaign finance reports as of May 13, 2026
Candidate	Raised	Spent	Cash on hand
Mark Takano (D)	$720,852	$911,988	$78,034
Source: Federal Election Commission

==== Results ====
Primary results
Party	Candidate	Votes	%
Democratic	Mark Takano (incumbent)	75,467	61.04
Republican	Steve Manos	48,177	38.96
Total votes		123,644	100.0

=== General election ===
==== Predictions ====
Source	Ranking	As of
Decision Desk HQ	Safe D	July 14, 2026
The Cook Political Report	Solid D	November 5, 2025
Inside Elections	Solid D	March 7, 2025
Sabato's Crystal Ball	Safe D	July 15, 2025
The Economist	Safe D	May 6, 2026

==== Fundraising ====
Campaign finance reports as of May 13, 2026
Candidate	Raised	Spent	Cash on hand
Mark Takano (D)	$720,852	$911,988	$78,034
Steve Manos (R)	$0	$0	$0
Source: Federal Election Commission

==== Results ====
2026 California's 39th congressional district election
Party	Candidate	Votes	%	±%
Democratic	Mark Takano (incumbent)			
Republican	Steve Manos			
Total votes				

== District 40 ==
2026 California's 40th congressional district election
- Reporting: 71% as of Nov 10 at 10:12 AM PST
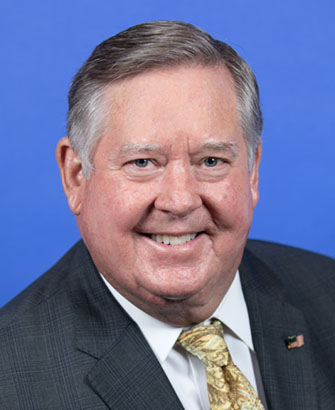

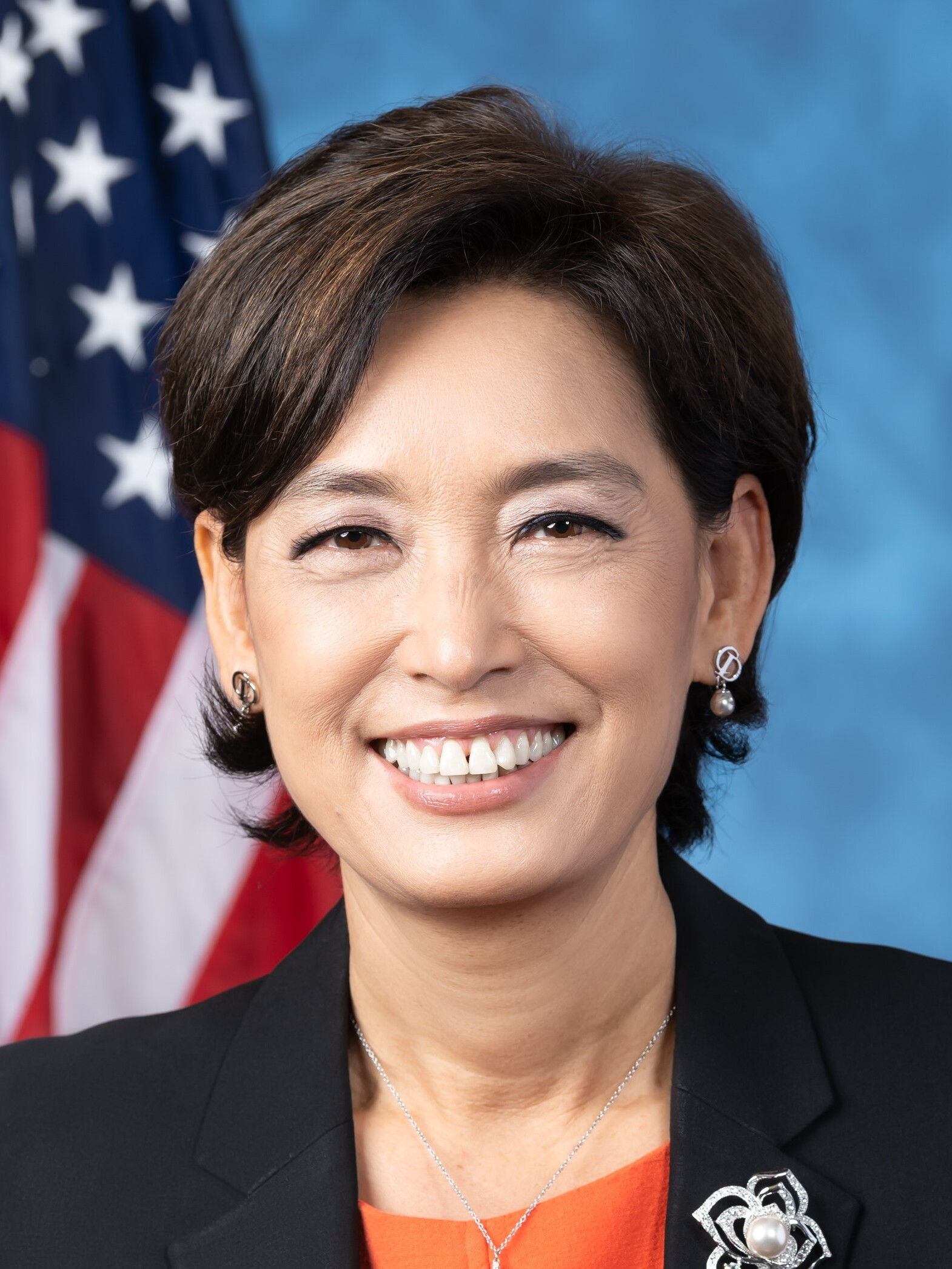
Candidate	Ken Calvert	Young Kim
Party	Republican	Republican
Popular vote	98,455	85,145
Percentage	53.6%	46.4%
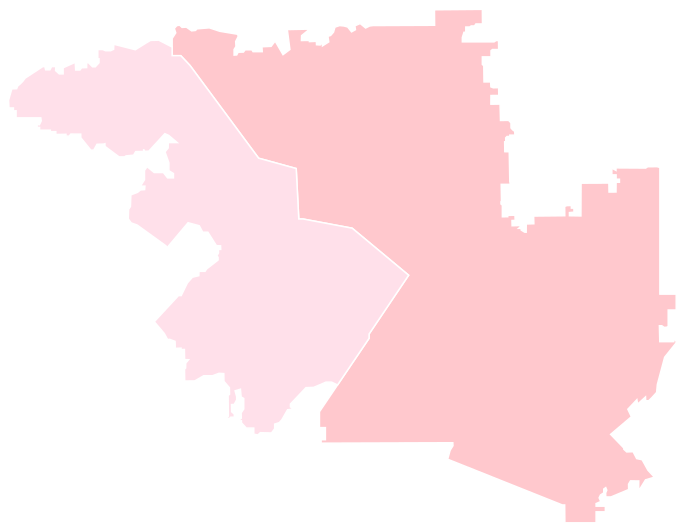
- Calvert: 20–30% 30–40%
U.S. Representative before election
Young Kim
Ken Calvert
Republican
Elected U.S. Representative
Ken Calvert
Republican

California's 40th congressional district boundary from the 2026 elections Interactive map version

Due to redistricting, two Republican incumbents were drawn into the same district: Young Kim, who was reelected with 55.3% of the vote in 2024, and Ken Calvert, who was reelected with 51.7% of the vote in 2024 in the 41st district. Both advanced to the general election.

=== Primary ===
==== Advanced to general ====
- Ken Calvert (Republican), incumbent U.S. representative (previously ran in the 41st district)
- Young Kim (Republican), incumbent U.S. representative

==== Eliminated in primary ====
- Francis Xavier Hoffman (Democratic), attorney
- Claude Keissieh (Democratic), electrical engineer
- Joe Kerr (Democratic), retired Orange County fire captain and runner-up for this district in 2024
- Esther Kim Varet (Democratic), director of Various Small Fires
- Nina Linh (no party preference), nonprofit executive; she originally entered the race as a Democrat and switched to no party preference after the passage of Proposition 50
- Lisa Ramirez (Democratic), immigration attorney

==== Withdrawn ====
- Christian Ahmed (no party preference), equipment technician
- Christina Gagnier (Democratic), former Chino Valley School Board member and runner-up for the 35th district in 2014
- Perry Meade (Democratic), labor organizer
- Paula Swift (Democratic), consultant (running for the 70th State Assembly district)
- Tiffanie Tate (Democratic), radio host (running for the 32nd senatorial district)

==== Declined ====
- Andy Thorburn (Democratic), national chair of Americans for Democratic Action and candidate for this seat in 2018 (Note: This district was numbered as the 39th district prior to the 2020 redistricting cycle.) (previously endorsed Meade)

==== Endorsements ====
Ken Calvert (R)

Executive branch officials

- Devin Nunes, chair of the President's Intelligence Advisory Board (2025–present)

U.S. representatives

- Mary Bono, former CA-45 (1998–2013)
- John Duarte, former CA-13 (2023–2025)
- Mike Garcia, former CA-27 (2020–2025)
- Brandon Gill, TX-26 (2025–present)
- Duncan D. Hunter, former CA-50 (2009–2020)
- Duncan L. Hunter, former CA-52 (1981–2009)
- Buck McKeon, former CA-25 (1993–2015)
- Gary Miller, former CA-31 (1999–2015)
- Doug Ose, former CA-03 (1999–2005)
- Dana Rohrabacher, former CA-48 (1989–2019)
- Mimi Walters, former CA-45 (2015–2019)

State legislators

- Kate Sanchez, state assemblymember from the 71st district (2022–present)

Local officials

- Donald Wagner, Orange County supervisor from the 3rd district (2019–present)

Organizations

- Log Cabin Republicans
Joe Kerr (D)

U.S. representatives

- Lou Correa, CA-46 (2017–present) (co-endorsement with Ramirez)
- Adam Gray, CA-13 (2025–present)
- Mike Levin, CA-49 (2019–present)
- Dave Min, CA-47 (2025–present)
- Linda Sánchez, CA-38 (2003–present)

State legislators

- Josh Newman, former state senator from the 29th district (2016–2018, 2020–2024)
- Tom Umberg, state senator from the 34th district (2018–present)

Labor unions

- California Federation of Labor Unions
- International Brotherhood of Teamsters Joint Council 42
- National Union of Healthcare Workers
Esther Kim Varet (D)

U.S. representatives

- Gil Cisneros, CA-39 (2019–2021), CA-31 (2025–present)
- Jasmine Crockett, TX-30 (2023–present)
- Laura Friedman, CA-30 (2025–present)
- Zoe Lofgren, CA-18 (1994–present)
- Marilyn Strickland, WA-10 (2021–present)
- Dean Phillips, former MN-03 (2019–2025)
- Harley Rouda, former CA-48 (2019–2021)

Statewide officials

- Eleni Kounalakis, lieutenant governor of California (2019–present)

Organizations

- ASPIRE PAC
- Center for Biological Diversity Action Fund
- Joint Action Committee for Political Affairs
- National Women's Political Caucus
- Vote Mama
Young Kim (R)

U.S. representatives

- Ed Royce, former CA-39 (1993–2019)

State legislators

- Brian Jones, minority leader of the California State Senate (2022–present) from the 40th district (2018–present)

Organizations

- Maggie's List
- Howard Jarvis Taxpayers Association

Newspapers

- Orange County Register
Lisa Ramirez (D)

U.S. representatives

- Lou Correa, CA-46 (2017–present) (co-endorsement with Kerr)
- Luz Rivas, CA-29 (2025–present)
- Raul Ruiz, CA-25 (2013–present)
- Linda Sánchez, CA-38 (2003–present)

State legislators

- Sharon Quirk-Silva, state assemblymember from the 65th district (2016–present)

Organizations

- CHC BOLD PAC
- National Women's Political Caucus

==== Fundraising ====
Campaign finance reports as of May 13, 2026
Candidate	Raised	Spent	Cash on hand
Ken Calvert (R)	$5,714,802	$3,619,919	$2,357,019
Claude Manuel Keissieh (D)	$34,100	$34,090	$0
Joe Kerr (D)	$254,923	$220,789	$34,134
Young Kim (R)	$8,207,461	$6,851,898	$3,093,061
Nina Linh (NPP)	$277,632	$246,354	$31,278
Lisa Ramirez (D)	$467,477	$417,670	$49,807
Esther Kim Varet (D)	$2,860,000 (Note: $592,000 of this total was self-funded by Kim-Varet.)	$2,594,423	$265,577
Source: Federal Election Commission

==== Primary election ====
Poll source	Date(s) administered	Sample size	Margin of error	Ken Calvert (R)	Joe Kerr (D)	Young Kim (R)	Esther Kim Varet (D)	Lisa Ramirez (D)	Other	Undecided
Tulchin Research (D) (Note: Poll sponsored by Kim Varet's campaign)	April 30 – May 4, 2026	500 (LV)	± 4.4%	24%	4%	22%	20%	6%	1% (Note: Nina Linh (I) with 1%; Claude Manuel Keissieh (D) with 0%)	23%
Public Opinion Strategies (R) (Note: Poll sponsored by Kim's campaign)	January 24–27, 2026	400 (LV)	± 4.9%	22%	22%	23%	14%	–	–	19%

==== General election ====
Ken Calvert vs. Esther Kim Varet

Poll source	Date(s) administered	Sample size	Margin of error	Ken Calvert (R)	Esther Kim Varet (D)	Undecided
Tulchin Research (D)	January 14–19, 2026	800 (LV)	± 3.5%	44%	44%	12%

Young Kim vs. Esther Kim Varet

Poll source	Date(s) administered	Sample size	Margin of error	Young Kim (R)	Esther Kim Varet (D)	Undecided
Tulchin Research (D)	January 14–19, 2026	800 (LV)	± 3.5%	44%	43%	13%

==== Results ====
Primary results
Party	Candidate	Votes	%
Republican	Ken Calvert (incumbent)	75,811	34.89
Republican	Young Kim (incumbent)	44,818	20.63
Democratic	Esther Kim-Varet	36,072	16.60
Democratic	Lisa Ramirez	30,495	14.03
Democratic	Joe Kerr	18,483	8.58
Democratic	Claude M. Keissieh	4,832	2.22
Democratic	Francis Xavier Hoffman	3,313	1.52
No party preference	Nina Linh	3,311	1.52
Total votes		217,286	100.0

=== General election ===
==== Predictions ====
Source	Ranking	As of
Decision Desk HQ	Safe R	July 14, 2026
Inside Elections	Solid R	November 6, 2025
The Cook Political Report	Solid R	November 5, 2025
Sabato's Crystal Ball	Safe R	November 5, 2025
The Economist	Safe R	May 6, 2026

==== Polling ====
Poll source	Date(s) administered	Sample size	Margin of error	Ken Calvert (R)	Young Kim (R)	Other	Undecided
Grassroots Targeting (Note: Poll sponsored by California First Fund, which supports Kim)	September 5–9, 2026	800 (LV)	–	34%	43%		
Public Opinion Strategies	August 17–20, 2026	400 (LV)	± 4.9%	35%	34%	10% (Note: "Would not vote" with 10%)	19%
American Viewpoint (R)	July 8–12, 2026	400 (LV)	± 4.9%	33%	32%	11% (Note: "Would not vote" with 11%)	24%

==== Fundraising ====
Campaign finance reports as of October 14, 2026
Candidate	Raised	Spent	Cash on hand
Ken Calvert (R)	$7,050,383	$6,332,129	$980,391
Young Kim (R)	$10,148,196	$10,973,617	$910,973
Source: Federal Election Commission

==== Results ====
2026 California's 40th congressional district election
Party	Candidate	Votes	%	±%
Republican	Ken Calvert (incumbent)			
Republican	Young Kim (incumbent)			
Total votes				

== District 41 ==
2026 California's 41st congressional district election
- Reporting: 96% as of Nov 10 at 10:12 AM PST
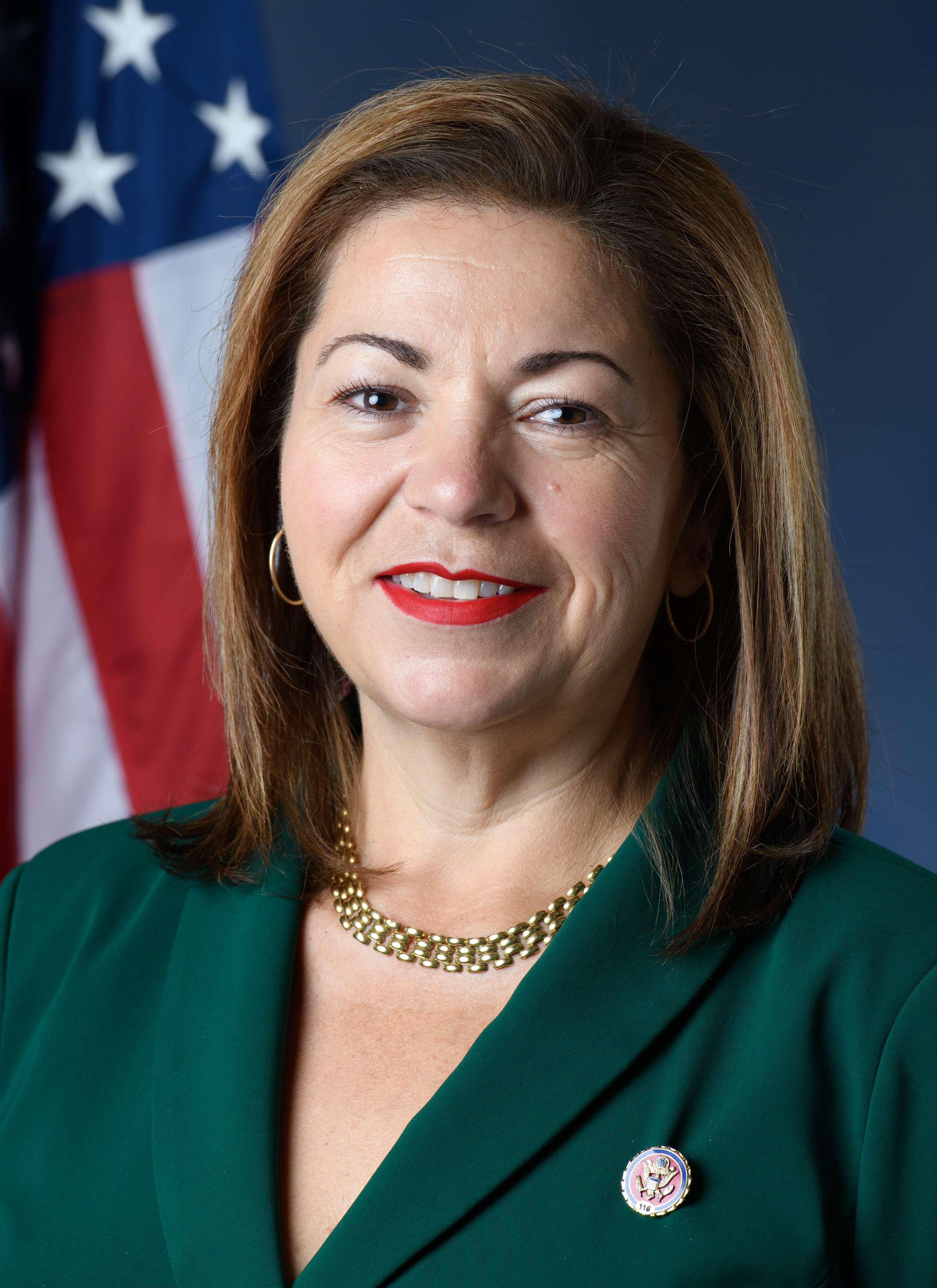

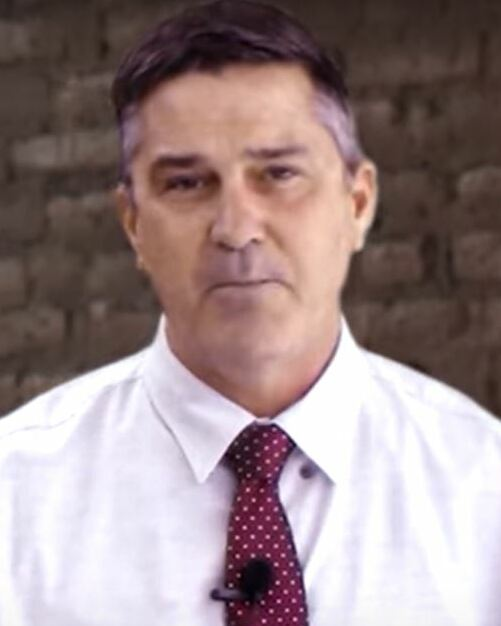
Candidate	Linda Sánchez	Mitch Clemmons
Party	Democratic	Republican
Popular vote	165,343	79,588
Percentage	67.5%	32.5%
U.S. Representative before election
Linda Sánchez
Democratic
Elected U.S. Representative
Linda Sánchez
Democratic

California's 41st congressional district boundary from the 2026 elections Interactive map version

The incumbent is Democrat Linda Sánchez, who was reelected with 59.8% of the vote in 2024.

=== Primary ===
==== Advanced to general ====
- Mitch Clemmons (Republican), plumbing contractor, runner-up for California's 30th senatorial district in 2022
- Linda Sánchez (Democratic), incumbent U.S. representative

==== Eliminated in primary ====
- Hector De La Torre (Democratic), former state assembly member from the 50th district (2004–2010), candidate for the 39th congressional district in 2002, and candidate for Insurance Commissioner in 2010
- Shonique Williams (Democratic), criminal justice advocate

==== Withdrawn ====
- Katherine Aleman (Democratic), former Norco city councilor
- Jason Byors (Democratic), software engineer (ran for state assembly)
- Ken Calvert (Republican), incumbent U.S. representative from the 40th (running in the 40th district)
- Abel Chavez (Democratic), president of the Nuview Union School District Board (ran in the 48th district)
- Anuj Dixit (Democratic), lawyer (ran in the 48th district)
- Tim Myers (Democratic), musician and record producer (ran for lieutenant governor)
- Ferguson Porter (Democratic), comic book store owner (ran in the 48th district)
- Brandon Riker (Democratic), entrepreneur and candidate for lieutenant governor of Vermont in 2016 (ran in the 48th district)

==== Endorsements ====
Hector De La Torre (D)

U.S. representatives

- Rick Lehman, former CA-19 (1983-1995)
- Alan Lowenthal, former CA-47 (2013–2023)
- Grace Napolitano, former CA-31 (1999–2025)
- Gloria Negrete McLeod, former CA-35 (2013-2015)
- Henry Waxman, former CA-33 (1975–2015)

State legislators

- Josh Lowenthal, speaker pro tempore of the California State Assembly (2024–present) from AD-69 (2022–present)

Organizations

- California Environmental Voters

Newspapers

- La Opinión
Linda Sánchez (D)

U.S. senators

- Alex Padilla, California (2021–present)
- Adam Schiff, California (2024–present)

U.S. representatives

- Pete Aguilar, chair of the House Democratic Caucus (2023–present) from CA-33 (2015–present)
- Gil Cisneros, CA-39 (2019–2021), CA-31 (2025–present)
- Katherine Clark, House Minority Whip (2023–present) from MA-05 (2013–present)
- Robert Garcia, CA-42 (2023–present)
- Jimmy Gomez, CA-34 (2017–present)
- Hakeem Jeffries, House Minority Leader (2023–present) from NY-08 (2013–present)
- Ted Lieu, CA-36 (2015–present)
- Luz Rivas, CA-29 (2025–present)
- Lucille Roybal-Allard, former CA-40 (1993–2023)

Labor unions

- California Faculty Association
- California Federation of Labor Unions
- National Union of Healthcare Workers
- SEIU California
- SEIU United Healthcare Workers West

Organizations

- J Street
- Joint Action Committee for Political Affairs
- Planned Parenthood Action Fund
- Sierra Club

Political parties

- California Democratic Party
Shonique Williams (D)

Organizations

- Track AIPAC

==== Fundraising ====
Campaign finance reports as of May 13, 2026
Candidate	Raised	Spent	Cash on hand
Hector De La Torre (D)	$555,002	$399,780	$155,222
Linda Sánchez (D)	$1,325,096	$1,092,529	$658,355
Shonique Williams (D)	$64,589	$46,885	$10,372
Source: Federal Election Commission

==== Results ====
Primary results
Party	Candidate	Votes	%
Democratic	Linda Sánchez (incumbent)	61,651	37.51
Republican	Mitch Clemmons	58,785	35.77
Democratic	Hector De La Torre	22,797	13.87
Democratic	Shonique Williams	21,112	12.85
Total votes		164,345	100.0

=== General election ===
==== Prediction ====
Source	Ranking	As of
Decision Desk HQ	Safe D	July 14, 2026
Inside Elections	Solid D	November 6, 2025
The Cook Political Report	Solid D	November 5, 2025
Sabato's Crystal Ball	Safe D	November 5, 2025
The Economist	Safe D	May 6, 2026

==== Fundraising ====
Campaign finance reports as of May 13, 2026
Candidate	Raised	Spent	Cash on hand
Linda Sánchez (D)	$1,325,096	$1,096,529	$658,355
Mitch Clemmons (R)	$0	$0	$0
Source: Federal Election Commission

==== Results ====
2026 California's 41st congressional district election
Party	Candidate	Votes	%	±%
Democratic	Linda Sánchez (incumbent)			
Republican	Mitch Clemmons			
Total votes				

== District 42 ==
2026 California's 42nd congressional district election
- Reporting: 93% as of Nov 10 at 10:12 AM PST
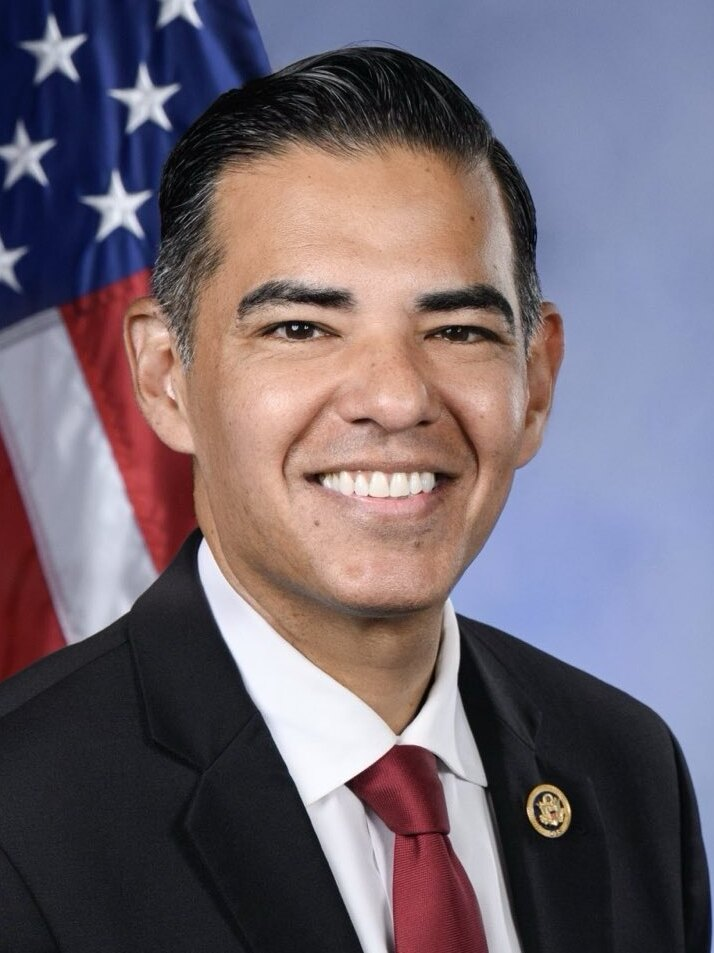

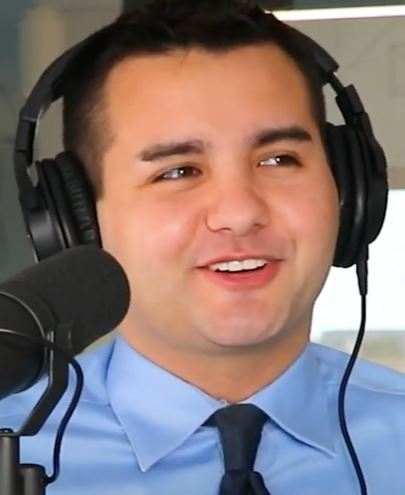
Candidate	Robert Garcia	Brian Burley
Party	Democratic	Republican
Popular vote	164,328	100,662
Percentage	62.0%	38.0%
U.S. Representative before election
Robert Garcia
Democratic
Elected U.S. Representative
Robert Garcia
Democratic

California's 42nd congressional district boundary from the 2026 elections Interactive map version

The incumbent is Democrat Robert Garcia, who was reelected with 68.1% of the vote in 2024.

=== Primary ===
==== Advanced to general ====
- Brian Burley (Republican), Huntington Beach City School District trustee and perennial candidate
- Robert Garcia (Democratic), incumbent U.S. representative

==== Eliminated in primary ====
- Long Pham (Republican), former Orange County Department of Education Board member and perennial candidate
- Larisa Vermeulen (no party preference), teacher
- Noah Von Blom (Republican), mayor pro tem of Newport Beach

==== Endorsements ====
Robert Garcia (D)

Labor unions

- California Federation of Labor Unions
- National Union of Healthcare Workers

Organizations

- California Environmental Voters
- Center for Biological Diversity Action Fund
- Giffords
- J Street
- Planned Parenthood Action Fund
- Stonewall Democratic Club

Political parties

- California Democratic Party

==== Fundraising ====
Campaign finance reports as of May 13, 2026
Candidate	Raised	Spent	Cash on hand
Noah Blom (R)	$136,437	$68,355	$68,082
Brian Burley (R)	$222,203	$204,405	$23,575
Robert Garcia (D)	$2,203,711	$1,467,658	$1,148,481
Larisa Vermeulen (I)	$0	$10,959	$0
Source: Federal Election Commission

==== Results ====
Primary results
Party	Candidate	Votes	%
Democratic	Robert Garcia (incumbent)	114,942	56.47
Republican	Brian Burley	41,919	20.60
Republican	Noah Von Blom	34,124	16.77
Republican	Long Pham	10,036	4.93
No party preference	Larisa Vermaulen	2,518	1.24
Total votes		203,539	100.0

=== General election ===
==== Predictions ====
Source	Ranking	As of
Decision Desk HQ	Safe D	July 14, 2026
The Cook Political Report	Solid D	November 5, 2025
Inside Elections	Solid D	March 7, 2025
Sabato's Crystal Ball	Safe D	July 15, 2025
The Economist	Safe D	May 6, 2026

==== Fundraising ====
Campaign finance reports as of May 13, 2026
Candidate	Raised	Spent	Cash on hand
Robert Garcia (D)	$2,203,711	$1,467,658	$1,148,481
Brian Burley (R)	$222,203	$204,405	$23,575
Source: Federal Election Commission

==== Results ====
2026 California's 42nd congressional district election
Party	Candidate	Votes	%	±%
Democratic	Robert Garcia (incumbent)			
Republican	Brian Burley			
Total votes				

== District 43 ==
2026 California's 43rd congressional district election
- Reporting: 98% as of Nov 10 at 10:12 AM PST
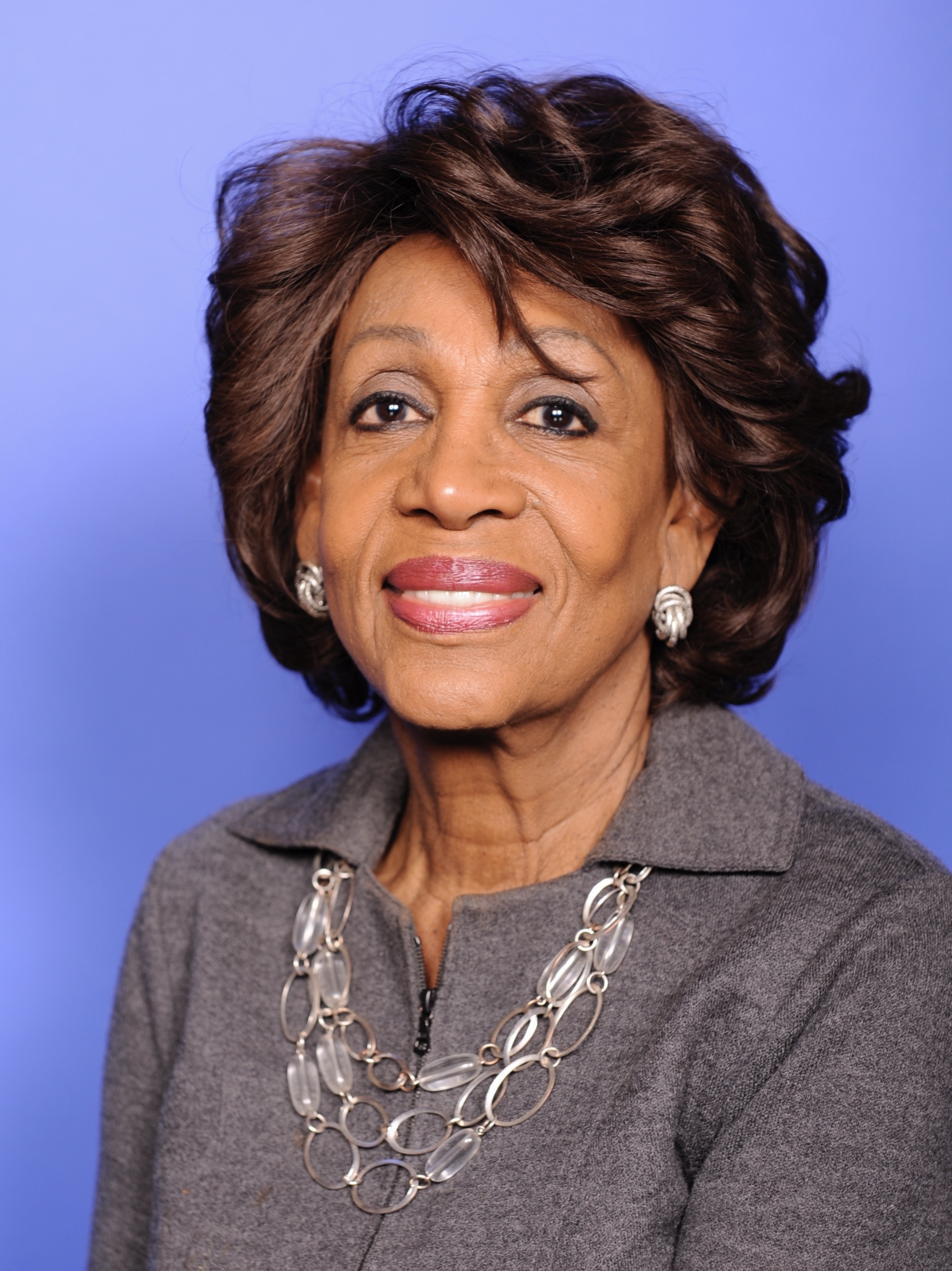

Candidate	Maxine Waters	Cristian Morales
Party	Democratic	Republican
Popular vote	153,546	31,713
Percentage	82.9%	17.1%
U.S. Representative before election
Maxine Waters
Democratic
Elected U.S. Representative
Maxine Waters
Democratic

California's 43rd congressional district boundary from the 2026 elections Interactive map version

The incumbent is Democrat Maxine Waters, who was reelected with 75.1% of the vote in 2024.

=== Primary ===
==== Advanced to general ====
- Cristian Morales (Republican), manufacturing executive
- Maxine Waters (Democratic), incumbent U.S. representative

==== Eliminated in primary ====
- Myla Rahman (Democratic), nonprofit executive
- David Sedlik (Democratic), aerospace sales engineer

=== Endorsements ===
Maxine Waters (D)

Labor unions

- California Federation of Labor Unions
- National Union of Healthcare Workers

Organizations

- California Environmental Voters
- Planned Parenthood Action Fund
- Sierra Club
- Stonewall Democratic Club

Political parties

- California Democratic Party

==== Fundraising ====
Campaign finance reports as of May 13, 2026
Candidate	Raised	Spent	Cash on hand
Myla Rahman (D)	$15,495	$13,793	$1,702
Maxine Waters (D)	$733,764	$527,178	$323,043
Source: Federal Election Commission

==== Results ====
Primary results
Party	Candidate	Votes	%
Democratic	Maxine Waters (incumbent)	75,693	63.79
Republican	Cristian Morales	20,009	16.86
Democratic	Myla Rahman	17,847	15.04
Democratic	David Sedlik	5,102	4.30
Total votes		118,651	100.0

=== General election ===
==== Predictions ====
Source	Ranking	As of
Decision Desk HQ	Safe D	July 14, 2026
The Cook Political Report	Solid D	November 5, 2025
Inside Elections	Solid D	March 7, 2025
Sabato's Crystal Ball	Safe D	July 15, 2025
The Economist	Safe D	May 6, 2026

==== Fundraising ====
Campaign finance reports as of May 13, 2026
Candidate	Raised	Spent	Cash on hand
Maxine Waters (D)	$733,764	$527,178	$323,043
Cristian Morales (R)	$0	$0	$0
Source: Federal Election Commission

==== Results ====
2026 California's 43rd congressional district election
Party	Candidate	Votes	%	±%
Democratic	Maxine Waters (incumbent)			
Republican	Cristian Morales			
Total votes				

== District 44 ==
2026 California's 44th congressional district election
- Reporting: 98% as of Nov 10 at 10:12 AM PST
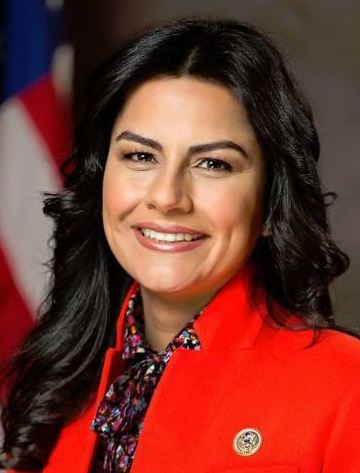

Candidate	Nanette Barragán	Genevieve Angel
Party	Democratic	Republican
Popular vote	146,292	32,794
Percentage	81.7%	18.3%
U.S. Representative before election
Nanette Barragán
Democratic
Elected U.S. Representative
Nanette Barragán
Democratic

California's 44th congressional district boundary from the 2026 elections Interactive map version

The incumbent is Democrat Nanette Barragán, who was reelected with 71.4% of the vote in 2024.

=== Primary ===
==== Advanced to general ====
- Genevieve Angel (Republican), healthcare executive
- Nanette Barragán (Democratic), incumbent U.S. representative

==== Endorsements ====
Nanette Barragán (D)

Labor unions

- California Federation of Labor Unions
- National Union of Healthcare Workers

Organizations

- California Environmental Voters
- Center for Biological Diversity Action Fund
- League of Conservation Voters Action Fund
- National Women's Political Caucus
- Planned Parenthood Action Fund
- Sierra Club
- Stonewall Democratic Club

Political parties

- California Democratic Party

==== Fundraising ====
Campaign finance reports as of May 13, 2026
Candidate	Raised	Spent	Cash on hand
Genevieve Angel (R)	$12,812	$4,320	$8,492
Nanette Barragán (D)	$669,609	$1,064,461	$1,086,701
Source: Federal Election Commission

==== Results ====
Primary results
Party	Candidate	Votes	%
Democratic	Nanette Barragán (incumbent)	84,690	77.01
Republican	Genevieve Angel	25,276	22.98
Democratic	Mark Stewart Greenstein (write-in)	5	0.00
Total votes		109,971	100.0

=== General election ===
==== Predictions ====
Source	Ranking	As of
Decision Desk HQ	Safe D	July 14, 2026
The Cook Political Report	Solid D	November 5, 2025
Inside Elections	Solid D	March 7, 2025
Sabato's Crystal Ball	Safe D	July 15, 2025
The Economist	Safe D	May 6, 2026

==== Fundraising ====
Campaign finance reports as of May 13, 2026
Candidate	Raised	Spent	Cash on hand
Nanette Barragán (D)	$669,609	$1,064,461	$1,086,701
Genevieve Angel (R)	$12,812	$4,320	$8,492
Source: Federal Election Commission

==== Results ====
2026 California's 44th congressional district election
Party	Candidate	Votes	%	±%
Democratic	Nanette Barragán (incumbent)			
Republican	Genevieve Angel			
Total votes				

== District 45 ==
2026 California's 45th congressional district election
- Reporting: 91% as of Nov 10 at 10:12 AM PST
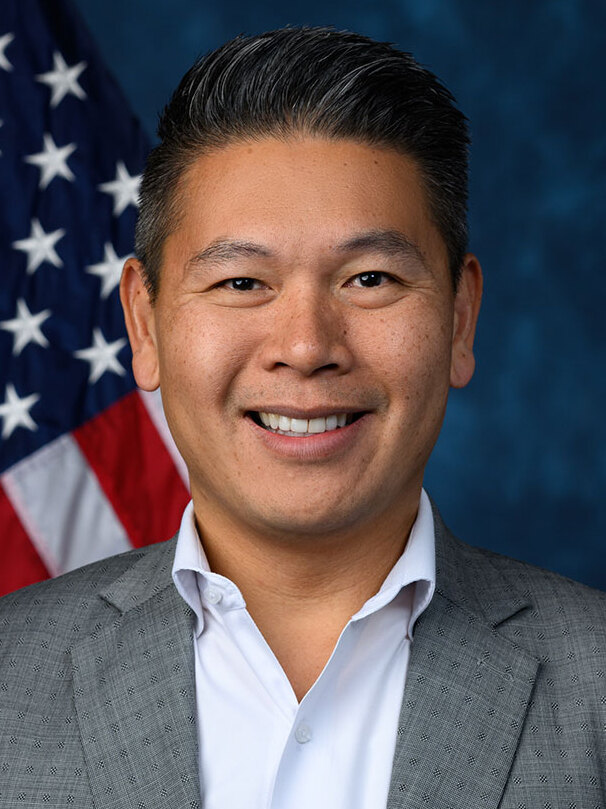

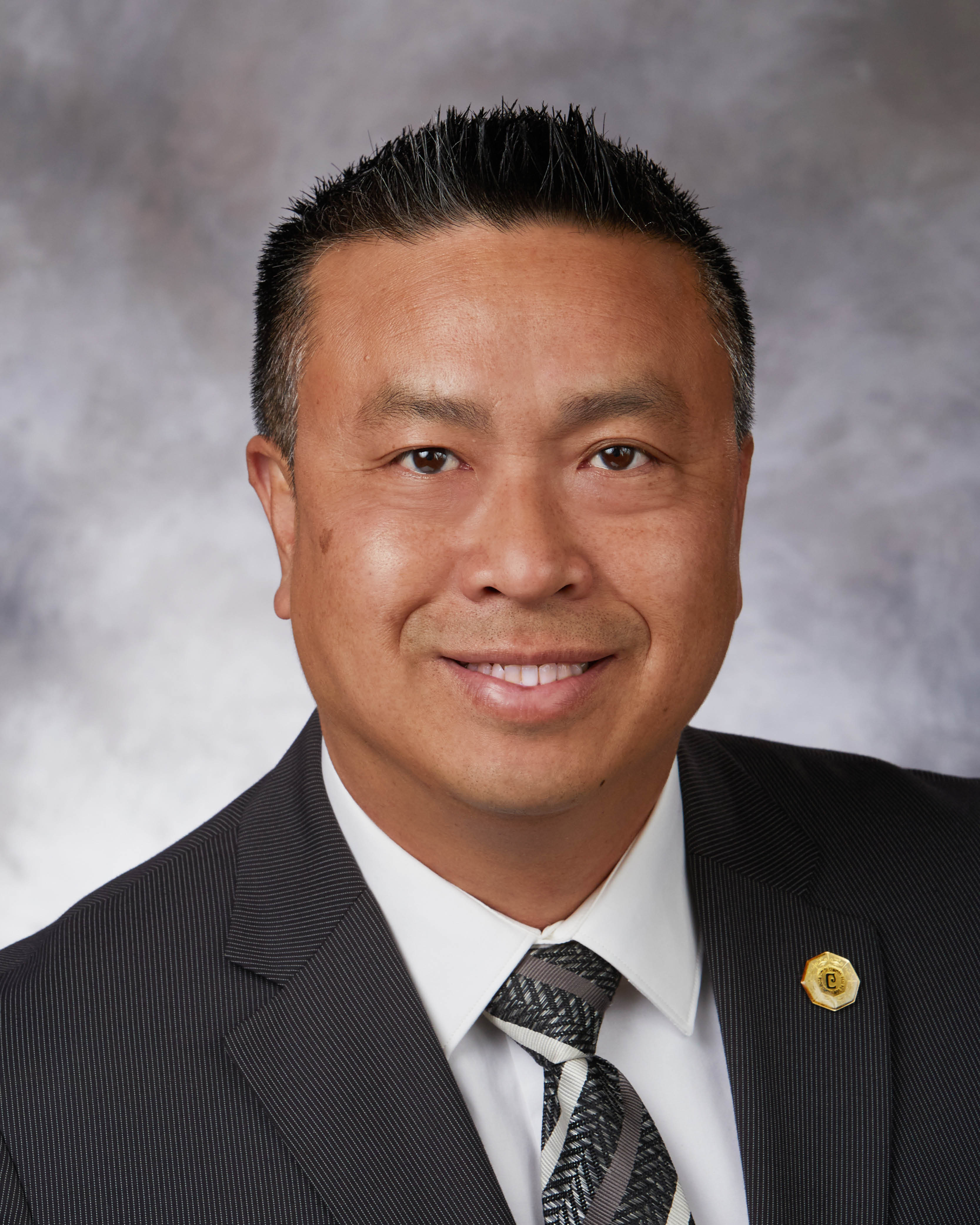
Candidate	Derek Tran	Chuong Vo
Party	Democratic	Republican
Popular vote	138,514	90,849
Percentage	60.4%	39.6%
U.S. Representative before election
Derek Tran
Democratic
Elected U.S. Representative
Derek Tran
Democratic

California's 45th congressional district boundary from the 2026 elections Interactive map version

The incumbent is Democrat Derek Tran, who flipped the district and was elected with 50.1% of the vote in 2024.

=== Primary ===
==== Advanced to general ====
- Derek Tran (Democratic), incumbent U.S. representative
- Chuong Vo (Republican), former mayor of Cerritos

==== Eliminated in primary ====
- Mark Leonard (Republican), analyst
- Chi Charlie Nguyen (Republican), mayor of Westminster
- Tom Vo (Republican), realtor
- Amy Phan West (Republican), Westminster city councilor and candidate for the 47th district in 2020 and 2022

==== Declined ====
- Janet Nguyen (Republican), Orange County supervisor
- Michelle Steel (Republican), former U.S. representative

==== Endorsements ====
Derek Tran (D)

Labor unions

- California Federation of Labor Unions
- National Union of Healthcare Workers
- SEIU California
- SEIU United Healthcare Workers West

Organizations

- Brady Campaign
- California Environmental Voters
- Council for a Livable World
- Giffords
- Jewish Democratic Council of America
- J Street
- Joint Action Committee for Political Affairs
- League of Conservation Voters Action Fund
- Planned Parenthood Action Fund
- Reproductive Freedom for All
- Sierra Club

Political parties

- California Democratic Party

==== Fundraising ====
Campaign finance reports as of May 13, 2026
Candidate	Raised	Spent	Cash on hand
Mark Leonard (R)	$25,945	$7,781	$18,164
Chi Charlie Nguyen (R)	$473,065	$195,363	$277,702
Derek Tran (D)	$4,200,766	$1,773,751	$2,754,338
Chuong Vo (R)	$405,946	$224,137	$181,809
Tom Vo (R)	$755,910 (Note: 500,000 of this total was self-funded by Vo.)	$727,814	$28,096
Amy West (R)	$57,697	$30,527	$27,169
Source: Federal Election Commission

==== Results ====
Primary results
Party	Candidate	Votes	%
Democratic	Derek Tran (incumbent)	86,184	53.76
Republican	Chuong V. Vo	24,591	15.34
Republican	Chi "Charlie" Nguyen	18,846	11.76
Republican	Tom Vo	13,643	8.51
Republican	Mark Leonard	9,516	5.94
Republican	Amy Phan West	7,526	4.69
Total votes		160,306	100.0

=== General election ===
==== Predictions ====
Source	Ranking	As of
Decision Desk HQ	Safe D	November 3, 2026
Inside Elections	Solid D	October 29, 2026
The Cook Political Report	Likely D	July 16, 2026
Sabato's Crystal Ball	Likely D	September 29, 2026
The Economist	Likely D	May 6, 2026

==== Post-primary endorsements ====
Chuong Vo (R)

Organizations

- Log Cabin Republicans

==== Fundraising ====
Campaign finance reports as of May 13, 2026
Candidate	Raised	Spent	Cash on hand
Derek Tran (D)	$4,200,766	$1,773,751	$2,754,338
Chuong Vo (R)	$405,946	$224,137	$181,809
Source: Federal Election Commission

==== Results ====
2026 California's 45th congressional district election
Party	Candidate	Votes	%	±%
Democratic	Derek Tran (incumbent)			
Republican	Chuong Vo			
Total votes				

== District 46 ==
2026 California's 46th congressional district election
- Reporting: 89% as of Nov 10 at 10:12 AM PST
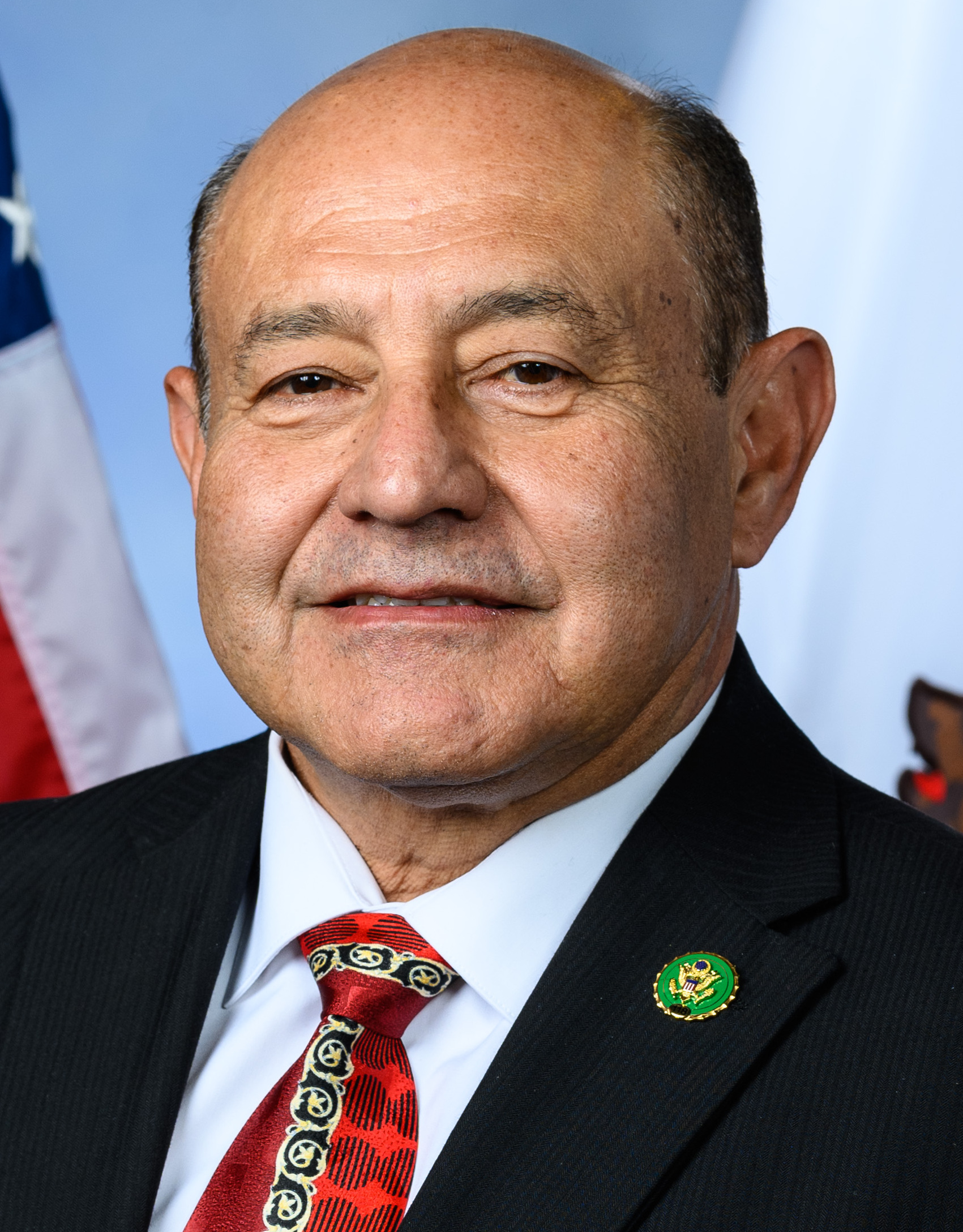

Candidate	Lou Correa	David Pan
Party	Democratic	Republican
Popular vote	123,785	51,683
Percentage	70.5%	29.5%
U.S. Representative before election
Lou Correa
Democratic
Elected U.S. Representative
Lou Correa
Democratic

California's 46th congressional district boundary from the 2026 elections Interactive map version

The incumbent is Democrat Lou Correa, who was reelected with 63.4% of the vote in 2024.

=== Primary ===
==== Advanced to general ====
- Lou Correa (Democratic), incumbent U.S. representative
- David Pan (Republican), college professor and runner-up for this district in 2024

==== Eliminated in primary ====
- Francisco Bahena (Democratic), military veteran
- Christian Mendez (Democratic), data analyst
- Armando "Mando" Perez-Serrato (Democratic)

==== Endorsements ====
Lou Correa (D)

Labor unions

- California Federation of Labor Unions
- National Union of Healthcare Workers

Organizations

- Planned Parenthood Action Fund
David Pan (R)

Political parties

- California Republican Party

==== Fundraising ====
Campaign finance reports as of May 13, 2026
Candidate	Raised	Spent	Cash on hand
Lou Correa (D)	$1,071,269	$599,666	$2,338,965
Christian Mendez (D)	$1,950	$1,916	$34
David Pan (R)	$72,726	$73,733	$1,872
Source: Federal Election Commission

==== Results ====
Primary results
Party	Candidate	Votes	%
Democratic	Lou Correa (incumbent)	61,587	51.94
Republican	David Pan	38,993	32.88
Democratic	Christian Mendez	9,263	7.81
Democratic	Armando "Mando" Perez-Serrato	5,763	4.86
Democratic	Frank Bahena	2,929	2.47
Democratic	Tony S. Castro (write-in)	49	0.04
Total votes		118,584	100.0

=== General election ===
==== Predictions ====
Source	Ranking	As of
Decision Desk HQ	Safe D	July 14, 2026
The Cook Political Report	Solid D	November 5, 2025
Inside Elections	Solid D	March 7, 2025
Sabato's Crystal Ball	Safe D	July 15, 2025
The Economist	Safe D	May 6, 2026

==== Fundraising ====
Campaign finance reports as of May 13, 2026
Candidate	Raised	Spent	Cash on hand
Lou Correa (D)	$1,071,269	$599,666	$2,338,965
David Pan (R)	$72,726	$73,733	$1,872
Source: Federal Election Commission

==== Results ====
2026 California's 46th congressional district election
Party	Candidate	Votes	%	±%
Democratic	Lou Correa (incumbent)			
Republican	David Pan			
Total votes				

== District 47 ==
2026 California's 47th congressional district election
- Reporting: 89% as of Nov 10 at 10:12 AM PST
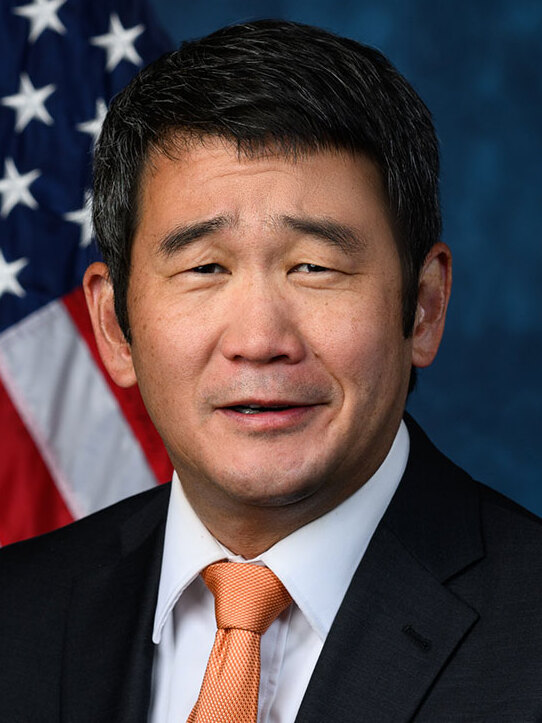

Candidate	Dave Min	Jenny Le Roux
Party	Democratic	Republican
Popular vote	151,904	110,445
Percentage	57.9%	42.1%
U.S. Representative before election
Dave Min
Democratic
Elected U.S. Representative
Dave Min
Democratic

California's 47th congressional district boundary from the 2026 elections Interactive map version

The incumbent is Democrat Dave Min, who was elected with 51.4% of the vote in 2024.

=== Primary ===
==== Advanced to general ====
- Jenny Le Roux (Republican), entrepreneur and candidate for governor in 2022
- Dave Min (Democratic), incumbent U.S. representative

==== Eliminated in primary ====
- Bill Brough (Republican), former state assemblyman from the 73rd district (2014–2020)
- Christopher J. Gonzales (Republican), attorney, runner-up for California's 46th congressional district in 2022
- Michael Maxsenti (Republican), communications consultant
- Hunter Garcia Miranda (Democratic), attorney
- Jesus Patino (no party preference), process engineer
- Derrick M. Reid (Libertarian), military geopolitical commentator
- Eric J. Troutman (no party preference), attorney

==== Endorsements ====
Dave Min (D)

Labor unions

- California Federation of Labor Unions
- National Union of Healthcare Workers

Organizations

- Asian American Action Fund
- Brady Campaign
- California Environmental Voters
- Center for Biological Diversity Action Fund
- Council for a Livable World
- Democratic Majority for Israel
- End Citizens United
- Giffords
- Jewish Democratic Council of America
- J Street
- Joint Action Committee for Political Affairs
- League of Conservation Voters Action Fund
- Natural Resources Defense Council
- Planned Parenthood Action Fund
- Reproductive Freedom for All
- Sierra Club

Political parties

- California Democratic Party
- Orange County Democrats

==== Fundraising ====
Campaign finance reports as of May 13, 2026
Candidate	Raised	Spent	Cash on hand
Bill Brough (R)	$7,125	$6,637	$488
Christopher Gonzales (R)	$10,570	$5,931	$4,639
Jenny Le Roux (R)	$269,084 (Note: 150,000 of this total was self-funded by Le Roux.)	$117,139	$151,945
Michael Maxsenti (R)	$157,642 (Note: 95,000 of this total was self-funded by Maxsenti.)	$152,541	$4,268
Dave Min (D)	$3,118,900	$1,470,265	$1,821,701
Hunter Miranda (D)	$20,593	$19,143	$1,449
Derrick Reid (L)	$10,370	$9,997	$373
Eric Troutman (NPP)	$265,067 (Note: 160,000 of this total was self-funded by Troutman.)	$250,508	$14,559
Source: Federal Election Commission

==== Results ====
Primary results
Party	Candidate	Votes	%
Democratic	Dave Min (incumbent)	89,515	45.45
Republican	Jenny Rae Le Roux	49,231	25.00
Democratic	Hunter Garcia Miranda	16,858	8.56
Republican	Michael Maxsenti	13,763	6.99
Republican	Bill Brough	11,773	5.98
Republican	Christopher J. Gonzales	9,813	4.98
No party preference	Eric Troutman	3,948	2.00
Libertarian	Derrick Michael Reid	1,291	0.66
No party preference	Jesus Patino	761	0.39
Total votes		196,953	100.0

=== General election ===
==== Predictions ====
Source	Ranking	As of
Decision Desk HQ	Safe D	July 14, 2026
Inside Elections	Solid D	March 12, 2026
The Cook Political Report	Solid D	January 15, 2026
Sabato's Crystal Ball	Safe D	February 5, 2026
The Economist	Safe D	May 6, 2026

==== Fundraising ====
Campaign finance reports as of May 13, 2026
Candidate	Raised	Spent	Cash on hand
Dave Min (D)	$3,118,900	$1,470,265	$1,821,701
Jenny Le Roux (R)	$269,084	$117,139	$151,945
Source: Federal Election Commission

==== Results ====
2026 California's 47th congressional district election
Party	Candidate	Votes	%	±%
Democratic	Dave Min (incumbent)			
Republican	Jenny Le Roux			
Total votes				

== District 48 ==
2026 California's 48th congressional district election
- Reporting: 70% as of Nov 9 at 5:58 PM PST
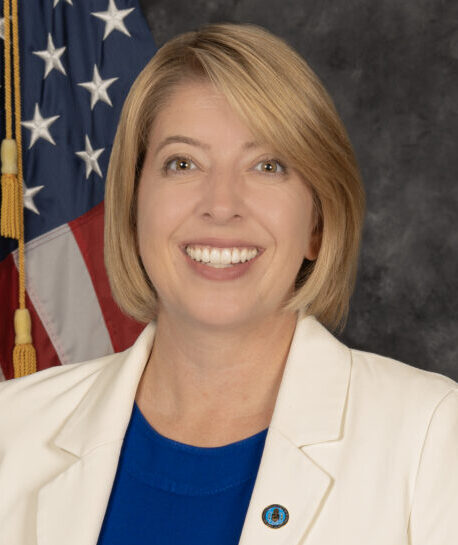

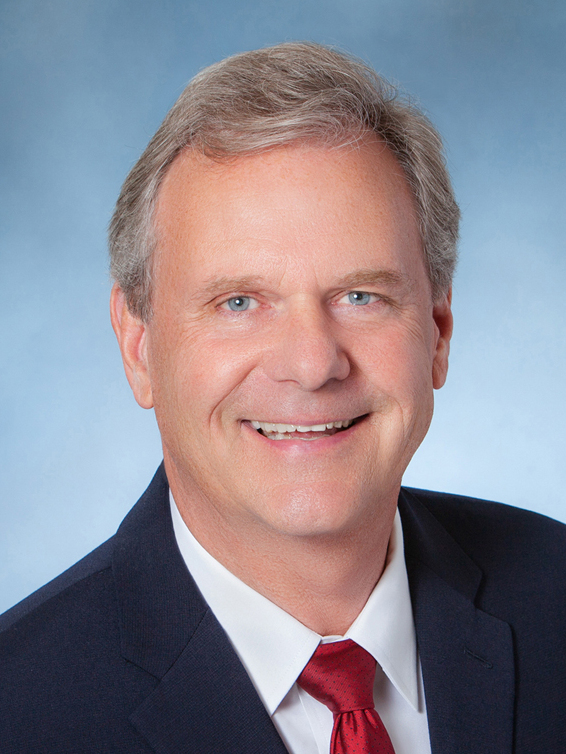
Candidate	Marni von Wilpert	Jim Desmond
Party	Democratic	Republican
Popular vote	130,516	87,304
Percentage	59.9%	40.1%
U.S. Representative before election
Darrell Issa
Republican
Elected U.S. Representative
Marni von Wilpert
Democratic

California's 48th congressional district boundary from the 2026 elections Interactive map version

The incumbent is Republican Darrell Issa, who was reelected with 59.3% of the vote in 2024. On March 6, 2026, Issa announced he would not run for reelection.

=== Primary ===
==== Advanced to general ====
- Jim Desmond (Republican), San Diego County supervisor from the 5th district (2019–present) (previously ran in the 49th district)
- Marni von Wilpert (Democratic), San Diego city councilor from the 5th district (2020–present) (previously ran for state senate)

==== Eliminated in primary ====
- Ammar Campa-Najjar (Democratic), naval officer, runner-up for mayor of Chula Vista in 2022 and runner-up for this district (Note: This district was numbered as the 50th district prior to the 2020 redistricting cycle.) in 2018 and 2020
- Abel Chavez (Democratic), president of the Nuview Union School District Board
- Stephen Clemons (Democratic), energy systems executive
- Corinna Contreras (Democratic), Vista councilmember (2018–present)
- Kevin Patrick O'Neil (Republican), computer software engineer
- Ferguson Porter (Democratic), comic book store owner (previously ran in the 41st district)
- Luis F. Reyna (no party preference), civil rights organizer
- Brandon Riker (Democratic), entrepreneur and candidate for lieutenant governor of Vermont in 2016 (previously ran in the 41st district)
- Mike Schaefer (Democratic), member of the California State Board of Equalization from the 4th district (2019–present) and perennial candidate
- Eric Shaw (Democratic), digital marketing executive

==== Withdrawn ====
- Anuj Dixit (Democratic), lawyer (previously ran in the 41st district)
- Marc Iannarino (Democratic), U.S. Navy veteran (endorsed Campa-Najjar)
- Darrell Issa (Republican), incumbent U.S. representative (endorsed Desmond)
- Curtis Morrison (Democratic), immigration attorney
- Brian Nash (Democratic), business analytics professional
- Suzanne Till (Democratic), member of the Padre Dam Municipal Water District Board of Directors (2020–present) (endorsed von Wilpert; ran for state senate)

==== Declined ====
- Carl DeMaio (Republican), state assemblymember from the 75th district (2024–present), runner-up for mayor of San Diego in 2012, runner-up for the 52nd district in 2014, and candidate for this district in 2020
- Lisa Middleton (Democratic), former Palm Springs city councilor from the 5th district (2017–2024) and runner-up for California's 19th State Senatorial district in 2024 (endorsed Riker)
- Will Rollins (Democratic), counterterrorism attorney and runner-up for the 41st district in 2022 and 2024

==== Endorsements ====
Ammar Campa-Najjar (D)

U.S. representatives

- Yassamin Ansari, AZ-03 (2025–present)
- Greg Casar, TX-35 (2023–present)
- Joaquin Castro, TX-20 (2013–present)
- Herb Conaway, NJ-03 (2025–present)
- Lou Correa, CA-46 (2017–present)
- Chris Deluzio, PA-17 (2023–present)
- Veronica Escobar, TX-16 (2019–present)
- Maxwell Frost, FL-10 (2023–present)
- Robert Garcia, CA-42 (2023–present)
- Jimmy Gomez, CA-34 (2017–present)
- Steven Horsford, NV-04 (2013–2015, 2019–present)
- Val Hoyle, OR-04 (2023–present)
- Sara Jacobs, CA-51 (2021–present) (candidate's domestic partner)
- Pramila Jayapal, WA-07 (2017–present)
- Barbara Lee, mayor of Oakland (2025–present) and former CA-12 (1998–2025)
- Mike Levin, CA-49 (2019–present)
- Ted Lieu, CA-36 (2015–present)
- Grace Meng, NY-06 (2013–present)
- ~~Dave Min, CA-47 (2025–present)~~
- Kevin Mullin, CA-15 (2023–present)
- Jimmy Panetta, CA-19 (2017–present)
- Scott Peters, CA-50 (2013–present)
- Luz Rivas, CA-29 (2025–present)
- Pat Ryan, NY-18 (2022–present)
- Andrea Salinas, OR-06 (2023–present)
- Marilyn Strickland, WA-10 (2021–present)
- ~~Eric Swalwell, CA-14 (2013–present)~~ (Note: Endorsement rejected by Campa-Najjar following accusations against Swalwell of sexual assault.)
- Norma Torres, CA-35 (2015–present)
- Derek Tran, CA-45 (2025–present)

Individuals

- Marc Iannarino, U.S. Navy veteran and former candidate for this district

Organizations

- ASPIRE PAC
- Bold PAC
- Congressional Progressive Caucus PAC
- VoteVets
- With Honor Fund
Abel Chavez (D)

Organizations

- Progressive Victory
Jim Desmond (R)

Executive branch officials

- Donald Trump, president of the United States (2017–2021, 2025–present)

U.S. representatives

- Brian Bilbray, former CA-49 (1995–2001) and CA-50 (2006–2013)
- Ken Calvert, CA-41 (1993–present)
- Tom Emmer, House majority whip (2023–present) from MN-06 (2015–present)
- Vince Fong, CA-20 (2024–present)
- Mike Garcia, CA-27 (2020–2025)
- Richard Hudson, NC-09 (2013–present)
- Darrell Issa, CA-48 (2001–2019, 2021–present)
- Mike Johnson, speaker of the House (2023–present) from LA-04 (2017–present)
- Kevin Kiley, CA-03 (2023–present)
- Lisa McClain, MI-09 (2021–present)
- Tom McClintock, CA-05 (2009–present)
- Steve Scalise, House majority leader (2023–present) from LA-01 (2008–present)

State legislators

- Carl DeMaio, state assemblymember from AD-75 (2024–present) (previously endorsed Issa)
- Brian Jones, minority leader of the California State Senate (2022–present) from SD-40 (2018–present)

Political parties

- California Republican Party

Organizations

- NRCC MAGA Majority
Brandon Riker (D)

U.S. senators

- Peter Welch, Vermont (2023–present)

U.S. representatives

- Ro Khanna, CA-17 (2017–present)

Local officials

- Lisa Middleton, former mayor of Palm Springs (2021–2022)
Marni von Wilpert (D)

U.S. senators

- Barbara Boxer, California (1993–2017)

U.S. representatives

- Becca Balint, VT-AL (2023–present)
- Julia Brownley, CA-26 (2013–present)
- Gil Cisneros, CA-39 (2019–2021), CA-31 (2025–present)
- Lois Frankel, FL-22 (2013–present)
- Gabby Giffords, former AZ-08 (2007–2012)
- Julie Johnson, TX-32 (2025–present)
- Emily Randall, WA-6 (2025–present)
- Bobby Scott, VA-3 (1993–present)
- Mark Takano, CA-39 (2013–present)

State legislators

- Catherine Blakespear, SD-38 (2022–present)
- Tasha Boerner, AD-77 (2018–present)
- Steve Padilla, SD-18 (2022–present)
- Chris Ward, AD-78 (2020–present)

Municipal officials

- Jennifer Campbell, San Diego city councilor from the 2nd district (2018–present)
- Terra Lawson-Remer, chair of the San Diego County Board of Supervisors (2025–present) from the 3rd district (2021–present)
- Suzanne Till, vice president (2024–present) of the Padre Dam Municipal Water District Board of Directors (2020–present) and former candidate
- Stephen Whitburn, San Diego city councilor from the 3rd district (2020–present)

Labor unions

- California Faculty Association
- California Federation of Labor Unions
- California School Employees Association
- California Teachers Association
- SEIU California
- SEIU United Healthcare Workers West

Organizations

- Brady Campaign
- Democratic Majority for Israel
- Elect Democratic Women
- EMILYs List
- Equality California
- Equality PAC
- J Street
- Joint Action Committee for Political Affairs
- LGBTQ Victory Fund
- LPAC
- National Women's Political Caucus

Political parties

- San Marcos Democratic Club
Anuj Dixit (D) (withdrawn)

U.S. representatives

- Dave Min, CA-47 (2025–present)
- Marilyn Strickland, WA-10 (2021–present)

Organizations

- ~~ASPIRE PAC~~(later endorsed Campa-Najjar)
Darrell Issa (R) (withdrawn)

Executive branch officials

- ~~Donald Trump, president of the United States (2017–2021, 2025–present)~~ (later endorsed Desmond)

State legislators

- ~~Carl DeMaio, state assemblymember from AD-75 (2024–present)~~ (later endorsed Desmond)

Political parties

- California Republican Party

Organizations

- Log Cabin Republicans
Curtis Morrison (D) (withdrawn)

Organizations

- Track AIPAC
Declined to endorse

Political parties

- California Democratic Party

==== Fundraising ====
Campaign finance reports as of May 13, 2026
Candidate	Raised	Spent	Cash on hand
Ammar Campa-Najjar (D)	$1,236,858	$1,115,647	$121,272
Abel Chavez (D)	$455,599	$433,102	$22,497
Corinna Contreras (D)	$33,550	$28,217	$5,333
Jim Desmond (R)	$1,904,608	$814,987	$1,089,621
Ferguson Porter (D) (Note: As last reported on September 30, 2025)	$63,492	$40,954	$22,537
Brandon Riker (D)	$2,104,403 (Note: 979,938 of this total was self-funded by Riker.)	$1,950,087	$154,325
Marni von Wilpert (D)	$1,259,899	$967,039	$292,860
Source: Federal Election Commission

==== Primary election ====
Poll source	Date(s) administered	Sample size	Margin of error	Ammar Campa-Najjar (D)	Abel Chavez (D)	Corinna Contreras (D)	Jim Desmond (R)	Darrell Issa (R)	Kevin Patrick O'Neil (R)	Brandon Riker (D)	Mike Schaefer (D)	Marni von Wilpert (D)	Other	Undecided
SurveyUSA (Note: Poll sponsored by KGTV and The San Diego Union-Tribune)	May 8–14, 2026	507 (LV)	± 6.0%	9%	4%	3%	29%	–	10%	6%	3%	9%	4% (Note: Eric Shaw (D) with 2%; Ferguson Porter (D) and Luis F. Reyna (I) with 1%; Stephen Clemons (D) with 0%)	25%
Tulchin Research (D) (Note: Poll sponsored by von Wilpert's campaign)	April 27–30, 2026	600 (LV)	± 4.0%	13%	–	–	27%	–	9%	8%	–	16%	7%	20%
SurveyUSA	April 14–19, 2026	500 (LV)	± 6.4%	12%	3%	4%	25%	–	13%	4%	6%	6%	4% (Note: Eric Shaw (D) with 2%; Stephen Clemons (D) and Ferguson Porter (D) with 1%; Luis F. Reyna (I) with 0%)	23%
	March 6, 2026	Issa withdraws from the race												
Tulchin Research (D)	February 16–22, 2026	600 (LV)	± 4.0%	14%	–	–	–	41%	–	5%	–	7%	8%	25%
Public Policy Polling (D) (Note: Poll sponsored by Equality PAC, which supports von Wilpert)	February 16–17, 2026	727 (RV)	± 3.6%	18%	–	–	–	40%	–	8%	–	7%	–	27%
Blueprint Polling (D) (Note: Poll sponsored by Campa-Najjar's campaign)	February 2–4, 2026	560 (LV)	± 4.1%	19%	3%	5%	–	44%	–	7%	–	6%	6% (Note: "Someone else" with 6%)	10%
Blueprint Polling (D)	February 2–4, 2026	560 (LV)	± 4.1%	21%	–	–	–	44%	–	8%	–	9%	–	18%

==== Results ====
Primary results
Party	Candidate	Votes	%
Republican	Jim Desmond	73,508	38.90
Democratic	Marni von Wilpert	39,327	20.81
Democratic	Ammar Campa-Najjar	20,095	10.64
Republican	Kevin Patrick O'Neil	13,132	6.95
Democratic	Brandon Riker	11,892	6.29
Democratic	Abel Chavez	10,339	5.47
Democratic	Corinna Contreras	10,056	5.32
Democratic	Mike Schaefer	4,770	2.52
No party preference	Luis F. Reyna	1,690	0.89
Democratic	Stephen Clemons	1,542	0.82
Democratic	Ferguson Porter	1,301	0.69
Democratic	Eric Shaw	1,299	0.69
Total votes		188,951	100.0

=== General election ===
==== Predictions ====
Source	Ranking	As of
Decision Desk HQ	Likely D (flip)	July 14, 2026
Inside Elections	Tilt D (flip)	December 5, 2025
The Cook Political Report	Lean D (flip)	March 12, 2026
Sabato's Crystal Ball	Likely D (flip)	October 20, 2026
The Economist	Likely D (flip)	May 6, 2026

==== Post-primary endorsements ====
Marni von Wilpert (D)

Federal officials

- Pete Buttigieg, former United States Secretary of Transportation (2021–2025)

Organizations

- Jewish Democratic Council of America
- New Democrat Coalition Action Fund

Political parties

- California Democratic Party

==== Fundraising ====
Campaign finance reports as of May 13, 2026
Candidate	Raised	Spent	Cash on hand
Jim Desmond (R)	$1,904,608	$814,987	$1,089,621
Marni von Wilpert (D)	$1,259,899	$967,039	$292,860
Source: Federal Election Commission

==== Polling ====
Poll source	Date(s) administered	Sample size	Margin of error	Jim Desmond (R)	Marni von Wilpert (D)	Other/Undecided
University of Southern California	October 22–28, 2026	474 (LV)	± 4.5%	40%	48%	12% (Note: Undecided with 10%; "I do not plan to vote in this election / I will skip this contest" with 2%)
University of Southern California	October 22–28, 2026	474 (LV)	± 4.5%	44%	52% (Note: With undecideds pushed)	4% (Note: "I do not plan to vote in this election / I will skip this contest" with 4%)
RedBox Research (D) (Note: Poll sponsored by A Fight Worth Having)	October 20–23, 2026	1,151 (LV)	± 3.6%	43%	48%	10% (Note: "Prefer not to answer" with 3%; "Someone else" with 2%; "Did not vote in this race" with 1%)
Tarrance Group (R) (Note: Poll sponsored by Desmond's campaign)	October 17–20, 2026	410 (LV)	± 4.9%	44%	47%	9%
SurveyUSA	October 1 – October 7, 2026	518 (LV)	± 5.2%	38%	47%	15%
SurveyUSA	August 27 – September 1, 2026	522 (LV)	± 5.2%	42%	45%	13%
Lake Research Partners (D)	July 9–14, 2026	500 (LV)	± 4.4%	46%	48%	6%

Hypothetical polling

Darrell Issa vs. Ammar Campa-Najjar

Poll source	Date(s) administered	Sample size	Margin of error	Darrell Issa (R)	Ammar Campa-Najjar (D)	Undecided
Blueprint Polling (D)	October 25–26, 2025	517 (LV)	± 4.3%	40%	43%	17%

==== Results ====
2026 California's 48th congressional district election
Party	Candidate	Votes	%	±%
Republican	Jim Desmond			
Democratic	Marni von Wilpert			
Total votes				

== District 49 ==
2026 California's 49th congressional district election
- Reporting: 82% as of Nov 10 at 10:12 AM PST
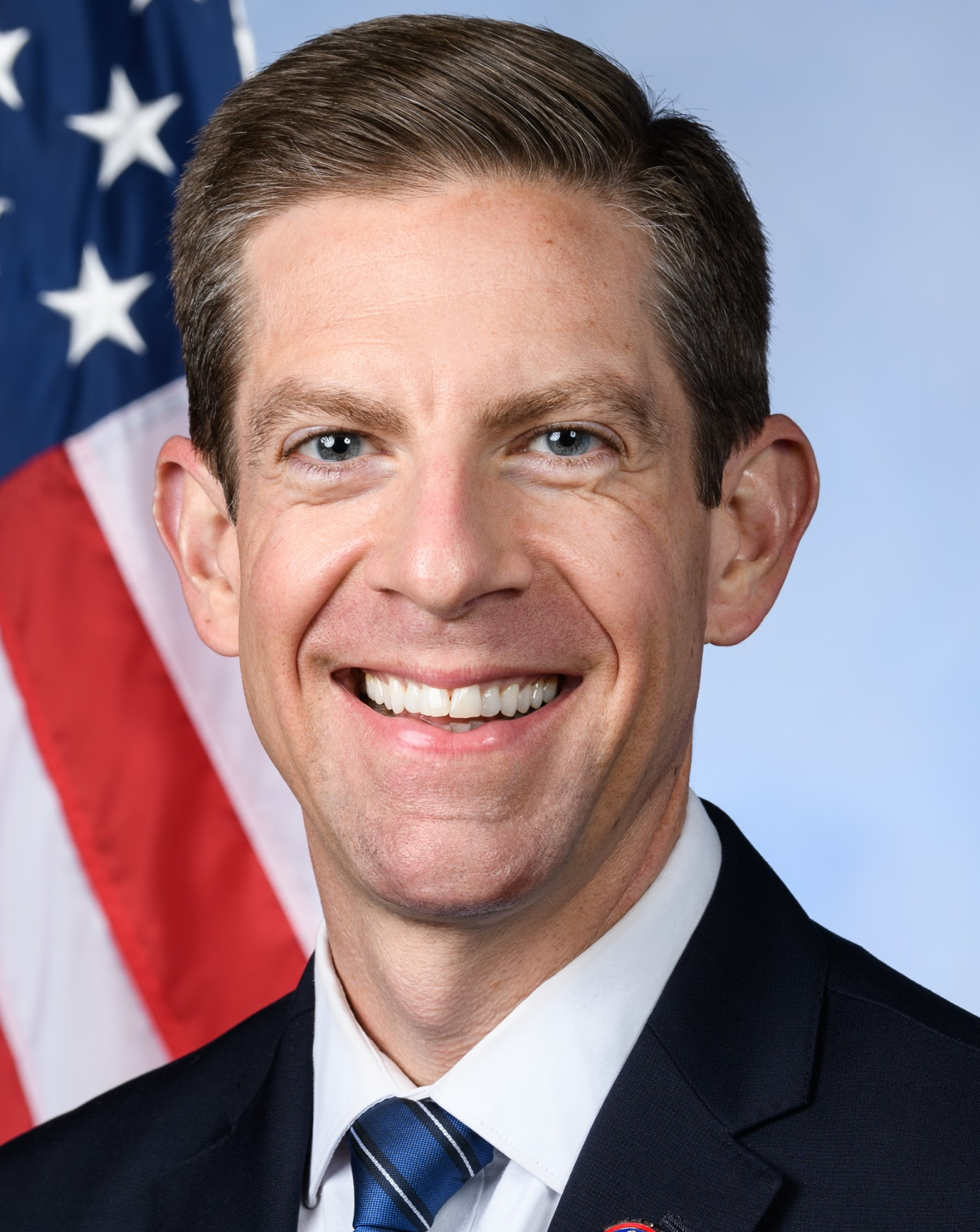

Candidate	Mike Levin	Armen Kurdian
Party	Democratic	Republican
Popular vote	165,332	116,160
Percentage	58.7%	41.3%
U.S. Representative before election
Mike Levin
Democratic
Elected U.S. Representative
Mike Levin
Democratic

California's 49th congressional district boundary from the 2026 elections Interactive map version

The incumbent is Democrat Mike Levin, who was reelected with 52.2% of the vote in 2024.

=== Primary ===
==== Advanced to general ====
- Armen Kurdian (Republican), retired navy captain
- Mike Levin (Democratic), incumbent U.S. representative

==== Eliminated in primary ====
- Star Parker (Republican), columnist and nominee for the 37th district in 2010

==== Withdrawn ====
- Jim Desmond (Republican), San Diego County supervisor from the 5th district (2019–present) (running in the 48th district)

==== Endorsements ====
Armen Kurdian (R)

U.S. representatives

- Darrell Issa, CA-48 (2001-2019, 2021–present)
Mike Levin (D)

U.S. senators

- Adam Schiff, California (2024–present)

U.S. representatives

- Sara Jacobs, CA-51 (2021–present)
- Scott Peters, CA-50 (2013–present)
- Juan Vargas, CA-52 (2013–present)

Local officials

- Todd Gloria, mayor of San Diego (2013–2014, 2020–present)

Labor unions

- California Federation of Labor Unions
- National Union of Healthcare Workers

Organizations

- AIPAC
- California Environmental Voters
- Center for Biological Diversity Action Fund
- Council for a Livable World
- Democratic Majority for Israel
- End Citizens United
- Jewish Democratic Council of America
- J Street
- Joint Action Committee for Political Affairs
- League of Conservation Voters Action Fund
- Planned Parenthood Action Fund
- Population Connection
- Sierra Club

Political parties

- California Democratic Party
- Encinitas and North Coast Democratic Club
- Orange County Democrats
- San Marcos Democratic Club

==== Fundraising ====
Campaign finance reports as of May 13, 2026
Candidate	Raised	Spent	Cash on hand
Armen Kurdian (R)	$23,196	$15,779	$7,417
Mike Levin (D)	$2,893,833	$1,779,935	$1,383,634
Star Parker (R)	$419,496	$328,915	$90,581
Source: Federal Election Commission

==== Results ====
Primary results
Party	Candidate	Votes	%
Democratic	Mike Levin (incumbent)	125,869	55.85
Republican	Armen Kurdian	58,822	26.10
Republican	Star Parker	40,661	18.04
Total votes		225,352	100.0

=== General election ===
==== Predictions ====
Source	Ranking	As of
Decision Desk HQ	Safe D	September 8, 2026
Inside Elections	Solid D	November 6, 2025
The Cook Political Report	Solid D	November 5, 2025
Sabato's Crystal Ball	Safe D	February 5, 2026
The Economist	Safe D	May 6, 2026

==== Post-primary endorsements ====
Mike Levin (D)

Individuals

- Richard Hanania, right-wing political commentator

==== Fundraising ====
Campaign finance reports as of May 13, 2026
Candidate	Raised	Spent	Cash on hand
Mike Levin (D)	$2,893,833	$1,779,935	$1,383,634
Armen Kurdian (R)	$23,196	$15,779	$7,417
Source: Federal Election Commission

==== Results ====
2026 California's 49th congressional district election
Party	Candidate	Votes	%	±%
Democratic	Mike Levin (incumbent)			
Republican	Armen Kurdian			
Total votes				

== District 50 ==
2026 California's 50th congressional district election
- Reporting: 83% as of Nov 9 at 5:58 PM PST
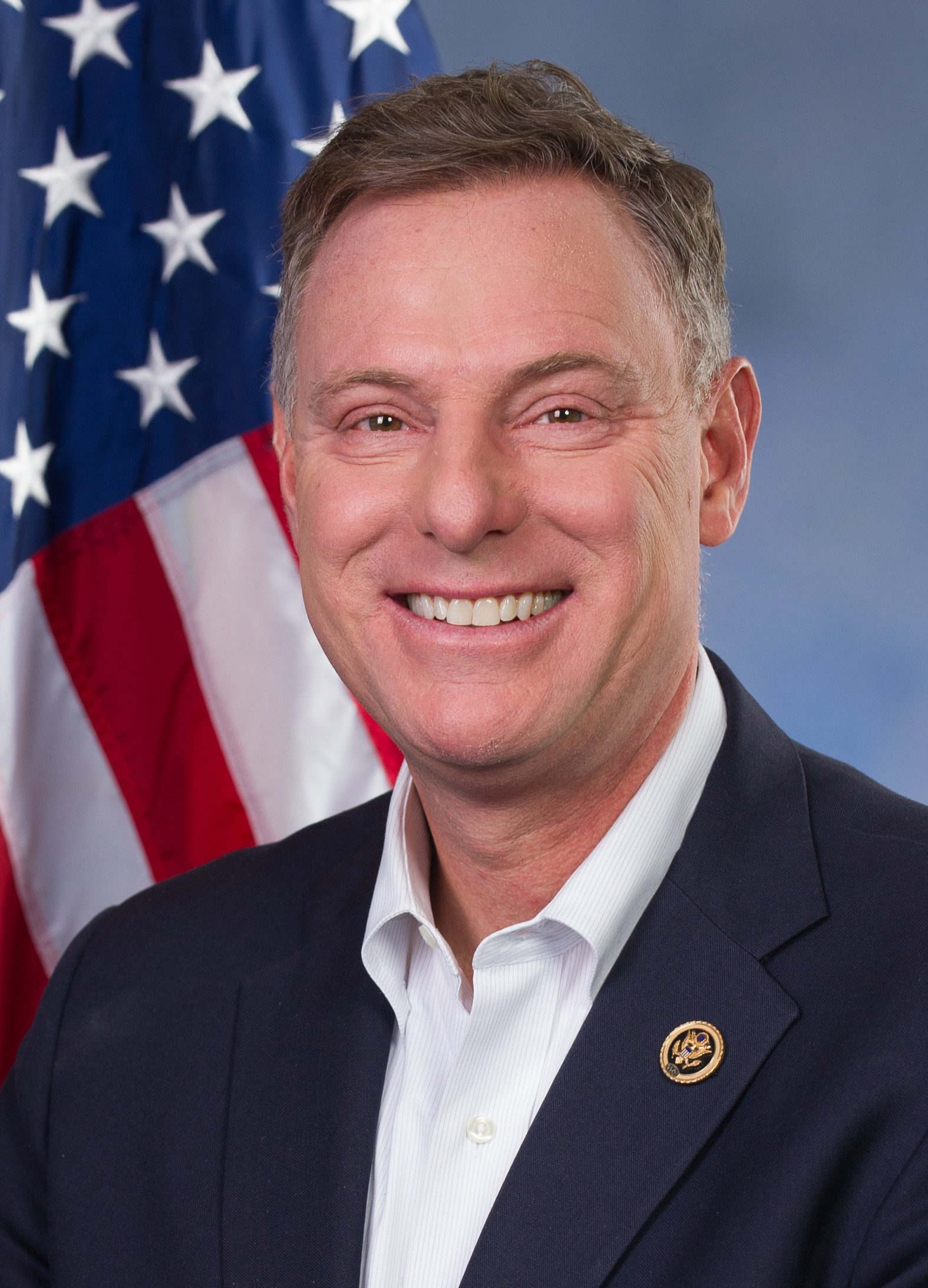

Candidate	Scott Peters	Steve Cohen
Party	Democratic	Republican
Popular vote	169,746	100,003
Percentage	62.9%	37.1%
U.S. Representative before election
Scott Peters
Democratic
Elected U.S. Representative
Scott Peters
Democratic

California's 50th congressional district boundary from the 2026 elections Interactive map version

The incumbent is Democrat Scott Peters, who was reelected with 64.3% of the vote in 2024.

=== Primary ===
==== Advanced to general ====
- Stephen Cohen (Republican), former news director of KUSI-TV
- Scott Peters (Democratic), incumbent U.S. representative

==== Eliminated in primary ====
- Tim Hatim Arnous (Democratic), entrepreneur
- Lucinda KWH Jahn (no party preference), event technician supervisor
- Aishwarya Mitra (Democratic), chemical engineer
- Joe Shea (Libertarian), retired math teacher

==== Endorsements ====
Aishwarya Mitra (D)

Organizations

- Progressive Democrats of America
- Track AIPAC
Scott Peters (D)

Political parties

- California Democratic Party

Organizations

- AIPAC
- California Environmental Voters
- J Street
- Planned Parenthood Action Fund
Declined to endorse

Labor unions

- California Federation of Labor Unions

==== Fundraising ====
Campaign finance reports as of May 13, 2026
Candidate	Raised	Spent	Cash on hand
Hatim Arnous (D)	$70	$203	$43
Aishwarya Mitra (D)	$14,239	$3,612	$10,627
Scott Peters (D)	$1,566,870	$1,185,108	$2,532,283
Source: Federal Election Commission

==== Results ====
Primary results
Party	Candidate	Votes	%
Democratic	Scott Peters (incumbent)	102,057	48.15
Republican	Steve Cohen	84,340	39.79
Democratic	Aishwarya "Sparky" Mitra	16,982	8.01
Democratic	Tim Arnous	3,793	1.79
Libertarian	Joseph "Joe" Shea	3,667	1.73
No party preference	Lucinda KWH Jahn	1,125	0.53
Total votes		211,964	100.0

=== General election ===
==== Predictions ====
Source	Ranking	As of
Decision Desk HQ	Safe D	July 14, 2026
The Cook Political Report	Solid D	November 5, 2025
Inside Elections	Solid D	March 7, 2025
Sabato's Crystal Ball	Safe D	July 15, 2025
The Economist	Safe D	May 6, 2026

==== Fundraising ====
Campaign finance reports as of May 13, 2026
Candidate	Raised	Spent	Cash on hand
Scott Peters (D)	$1,566,870	$1,185,108	$2,532,283
Steve Cohen (R)	$0	$0	$0
Source: Federal Election Commission

==== Results ====
2026 California's 50th congressional district election
Party	Candidate	Votes	%	±%
Democratic	Scott Peters (incumbent)			
Republican	Steve Cohen			
Total votes				

== District 51 ==
2026 California's 51st congressional district election
- Reporting: 85% as of Nov 9 at 5:58 PM PST
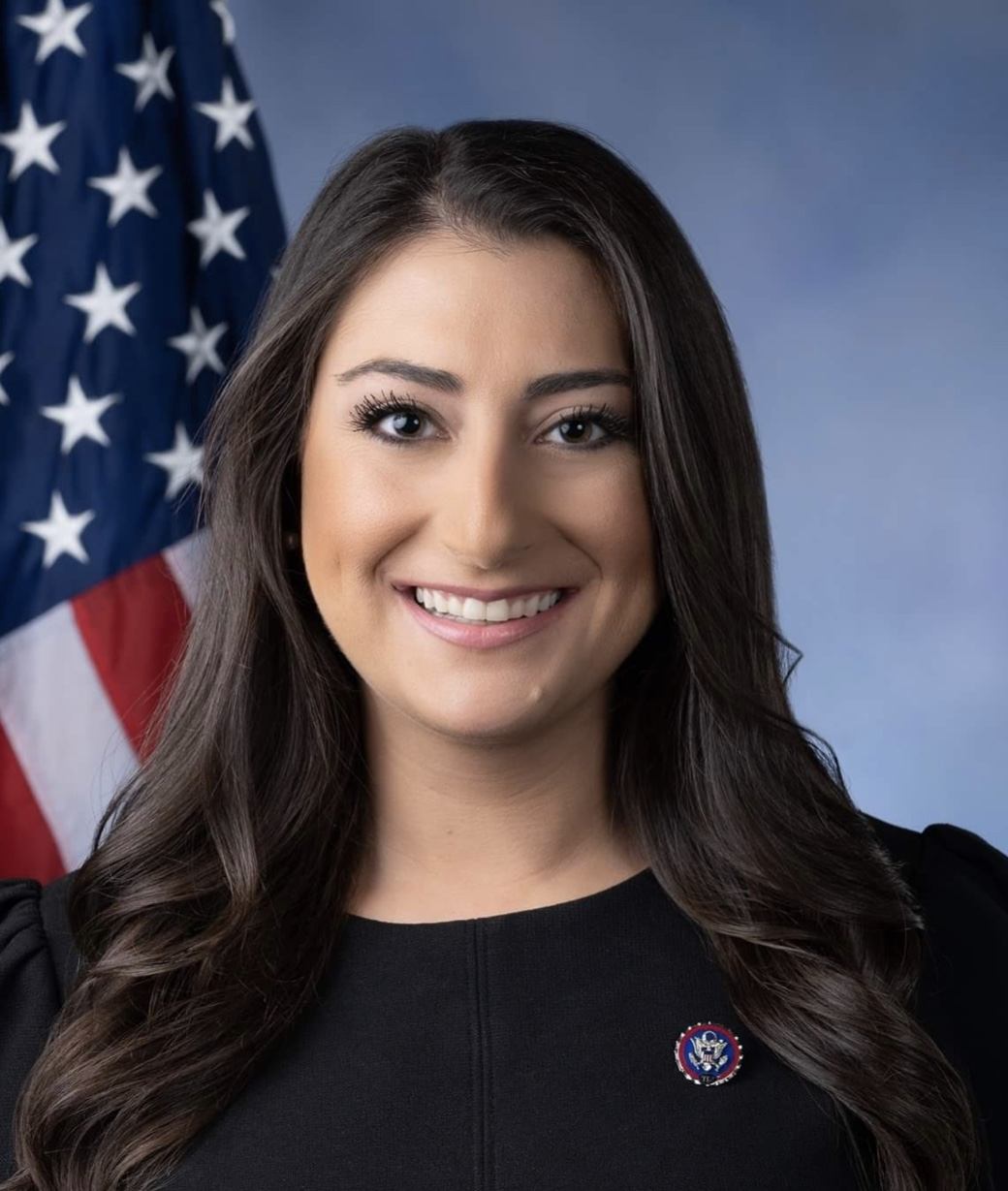

Candidate	Sara Jacobs	Ricardo Cabrera
Party	Democratic	Republican
Popular vote	162,116	85,678
Percentage	65.4%	34.6%
U.S. Representative before election
Sara Jacobs
Democratic
Elected U.S. Representative
Sara Jacobs
Democratic

California's 51st congressional district boundary from the 2026 elections Interactive map version

The incumbent is Democrat Sara Jacobs, who was reelected with 60.7% of the vote in 2024.

=== Primary ===
==== Advanced to general ====
- Ricardo Cabrera (Republican), business owner
- Sara Jacobs (Democratic), incumbent U.S. representative

==== Eliminated in primary ====
- Stan Caplan (Democratic), business owner, Republican runner-up for this district in 2022, and independent candidate in 2024
- David W. Engel (Democratic), civil engineer

==== Endorsements ====
Sara Jacobs (D)

Labor unions

- California Federation of Labor Unions
- National Union of Healthcare Workers

Organizations

- California Environmental Voters
- End Citizens United
- Giffords
- Jewish Democratic Council of America
- J Street
- National Women's Political Caucus
- Planned Parenthood Action Fund

Political parties

- California Democratic Party

==== Fundraising ====
Campaign finance reports as of May 13, 2026
Candidate	Raised	Spent	Cash on hand
Sara Jacobs (D)	$1,561,377	$1,368,638	$270,111
Source: Federal Election Commission

==== Results ====
Primary results
Party	Candidate	Votes	%
Democratic	Sara Jacobs (incumbent)	111,765	57.74
Republican	Ricardo Cabrera	71,692	37.04
Democratic	David W. Engel	6,173	3.19
Democratic	Stan Caplan	3,943	2.04
Total votes		193,573	100.0

=== General election ===
==== Predictions ====
Source	Ranking	As of
Decision Desk HQ	Safe D	July 14, 2026
The Cook Political Report	Solid D	November 5, 2025
Inside Elections	Solid D	March 7, 2025
Sabato's Crystal Ball	Safe D	July 15, 2025
The Economist	Safe D	May 6, 2026

==== Fundraising ====
Campaign finance reports as of May 13, 2026
Candidate	Raised	Spent	Cash on hand
Sara Jacobs (D)	$1,561,377	$1,368,638	$270,111
Ricardo Cabrera (R)	$0	$0	$0
Source: Federal Election Commission

==== Results ====
2026 California's 51st congressional district election
Party	Candidate	Votes	%	±%
Democratic	Sara Jacobs (incumbent)			
Republican	Ricardo Cabrera			
Total votes				

== District 52 ==
2026 California's 52nd congressional district election
- Reporting: 85% as of Nov 9 at 5:58 PM PST
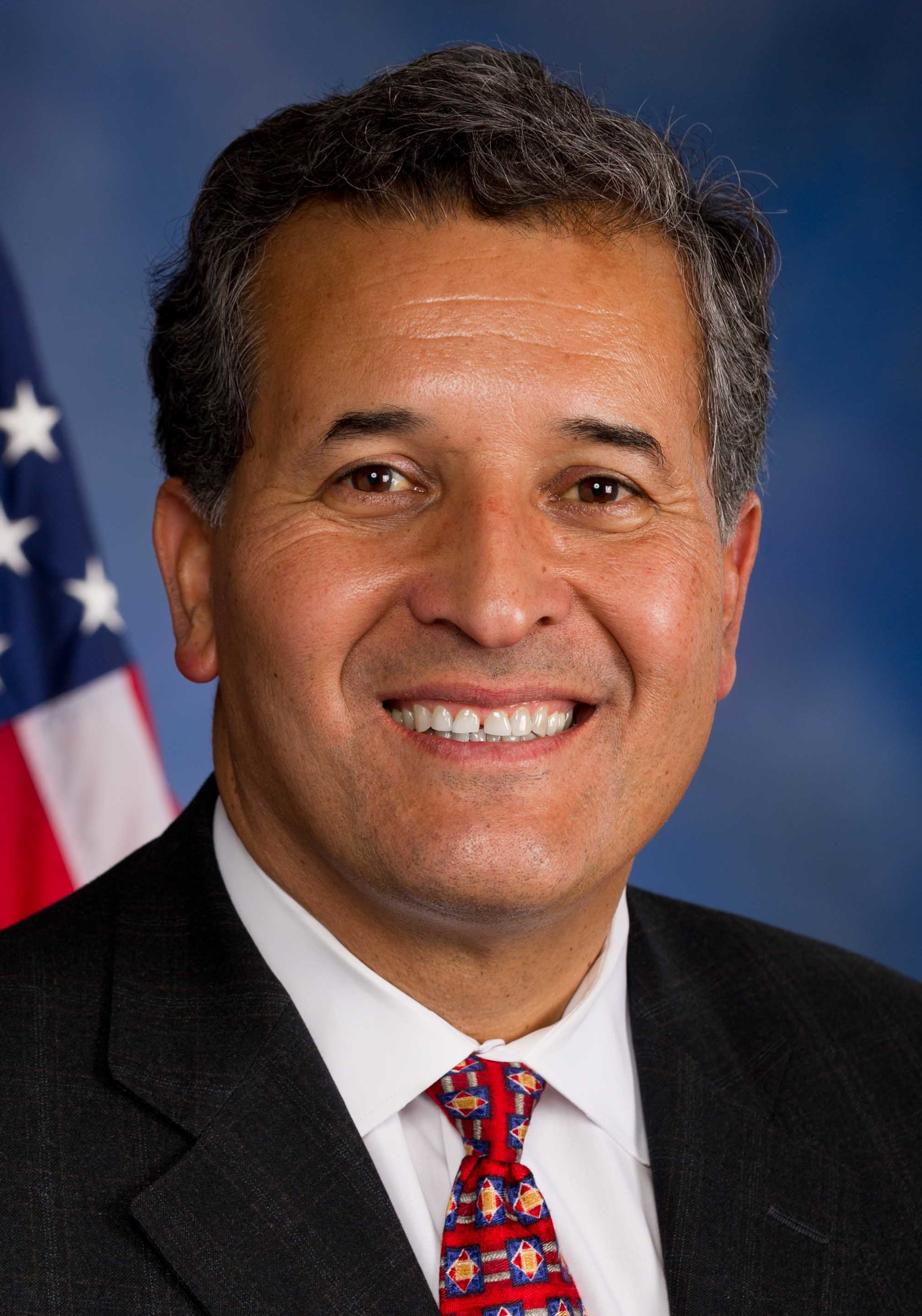

Candidate	Juan Vargas	Jeff Belle
Party	Democratic	Republican
Popular vote	134,518	54,696
Percentage	71.1%	28.9%
U.S. Representative before election
Juan Vargas
Democratic
Elected U.S. Representative
Juan Vargas
Democratic

California's 52nd congressional district boundary from the 2026 elections Interactive map version

The incumbent is Democrat Juan Vargas, who was reelected with 66.3% of the vote in 2024.

=== Primary ===
==== Advanced to general ====
- Jeff Belle (Republican), business owner
- Juan Vargas (Democratic), incumbent U.S. representative

==== Eliminated in primary ====
- Deborah Calhoun Rhodes (Democratic), business owner

==== Disqualified ====
- Frances Motiwalla (Democratic), community organizer

==== Endorsements ====
Juan Vargas (D)

Labor unions

- California Federation of Labor Unions
- National Union of Healthcare Workers

Organizations

- AIPAC
- California Environmental Voters
- Democratic Majority for Israel
- Planned Parenthood Action Fund

Political parties

- California Democratic Party

==== Fundraising ====
Campaign finance reports as of May 13, 2026
Candidate	Raised	Spent	Cash on hand
Jeff Belle (R)	$20,597	$20,038	$560
Frances Motiwalla (D)	$1,281	$47	$1,234
Juan Vargas (D)	$472,273	$466,926	$96,187
Source: Federal Election Commission

==== Results ====
Primary results
Party	Candidate	Votes	%
Democratic	Juan Vargas (incumbent)	71,608	56.48
Republican	Jeff Belle	42,090	33.20
Democratic	Deborah Calhoun Rhodes	12,070	9.52
Democratic	Frances Yasmeen Motiwalla (write-in)	1,010	0.80
Total votes		126,778	100.0

=== General election ===
==== Predictions ====
Source	Ranking	As of
Decision Desk HQ	Safe D	July 14, 2026
The Cook Political Report	Solid D	November 5, 2025
Inside Elections	Solid D	March 7, 2025
Sabato's Crystal Ball	Safe D	July 15, 2025
The Economist	Safe D	May 6, 2026

==== Fundraising ====
Campaign finance reports as of May 13, 2026
Candidate	Raised	Spent	Cash on hand
Juan Vargas (D)	$472,273	$466,926	$96,187
Jeff Belle (R)	$20,597	$20,038	$560
Source: Federal Election Commission

==== Results ====
2026 California's 52nd congressional district election
Party	Candidate	Votes	%	±%
Democratic	Juan Vargas (incumbent)			
Republican	Jeff Belle			
Total votes				

== Notes ==
Partisan and media clients
