= 2017 United States House of Representatives elections =

- April 11, 2017 – November 7, 2017

6 of the 435 seats in the United States House of Representatives 218 seats needed for a majority
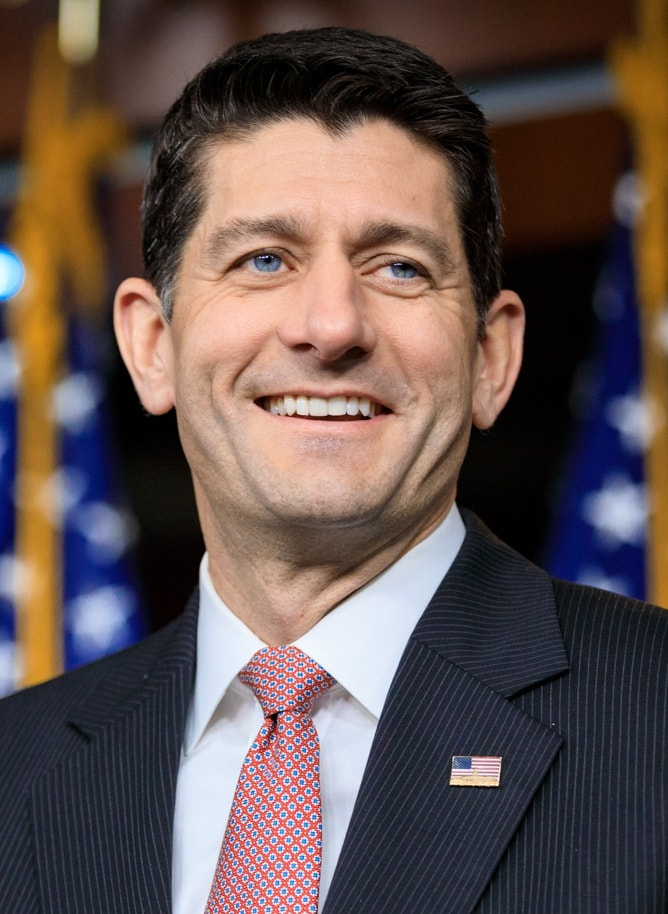

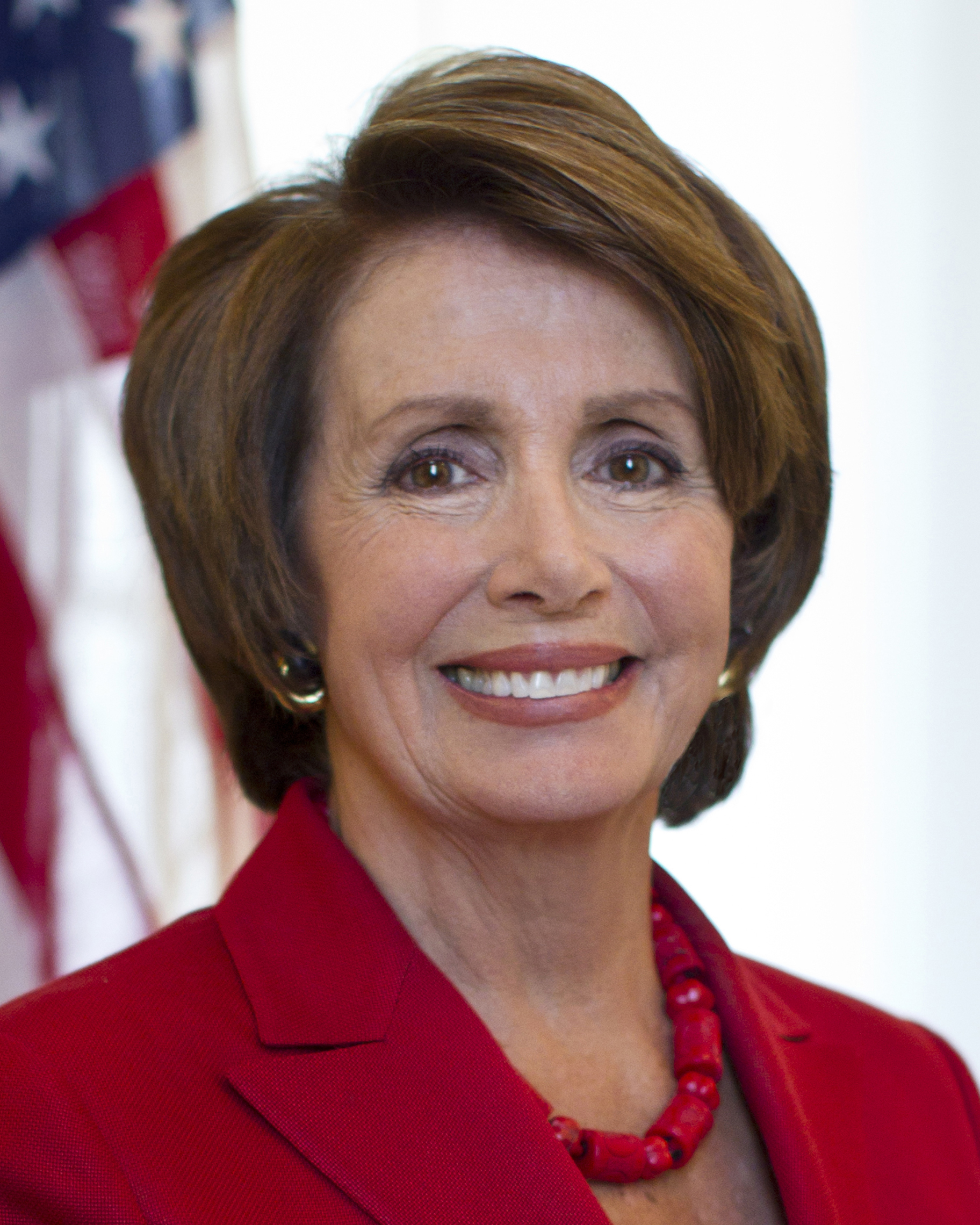
	Majority party	Minority party
Leader	Paul Ryan	Nancy Pelosi
Party	Republican	Democratic
Leader since	October 29, 2015	January 3, 2003
Leader's seat	Wisconsin 1st	California 12th
Last election	241 seats	194 seats
Seats won	5	1
Seat change	Steady	Steady
Popular vote	520,178	474,464
Percentage	49.8%	45.4%
- Results: Democratic hold Republican hold
Speaker before election
Paul Ryan
Republican
Speaker after election
Paul Ryan
Republican

There were six special elections to the United States House of Representatives in 2017 during the 115th United States Congress.

All of the elections were won by the party previously holding the seat. Therefore, there were no net changes in party.

Although Democrats did not gain any seats, their margins were narrower than the districts' Cook Partisan Voting Index.

Elections are sorted by date and district.

== Summary ==
District		Incumbent			This race
Location	Member	Party	First elected	Results	Candidates
Kansas 4	Mike Pompeo	Republican	2010	Incumbent resigned January 23, 2017 to become Director of the Central Intelligence Agency. New member elected April 11, 2017. Republican hold.	▌ ✓ Ron Estes (Republican) 52.2%; ▌James Thompson (Democratic) 46.0%; ▌Chris Rockhold (Libertarian) 1.7%
Montana at-large	Ryan Zinke	Republican	2014	Incumbent resigned March 1, 2017 to become U.S. Secretary of the Interior. New member elected May 25, 2017. Republican hold.	▌ ✓ Greg Gianforte (Republican) 49.95%; ▌Rob Quist (Democratic) 44.37%; ▌Mark Wicks (Libertarian) 5.68%
California 34	Xavier Becerra	Democratic	1992	Incumbent resigned January 24, 2017 to become Attorney General of California. New member elected June 6, 2017. Democratic hold.	▌ ✓ Jimmy Gomez (Democratic) 59.22%; ▌Robert Lee Ahn (Democratic) 40.78%
Georgia 6	Tom Price	Republican	2004	Incumbent resigned February 10, 2017 to become U.S. Secretary of Health and Human Services. New member elected June 20, 2017. Republican hold.	▌ ✓ Karen Handel (Republican) 51.78%; ▌Jon Ossoff (Democratic) 48.22%
South Carolina 5	Mick Mulvaney	Republican	2010	Incumbent resigned February 16, 2017 to become Director of the Office of Management and Budget. New member elected June 20, 2017. Republican hold.	▌ ✓ Ralph Norman (Republican) 51.04%; ▌Archie Parnell (Democratic) 47.94%
Utah 3	Jason Chaffetz	Republican	2008	Incumbent resigned June 30, 2017 for health reasons. New member elected November 7, 2017. Republican hold.	▌ ✓ John Curtis (Republican) 58.03%; ▌Kathie Allen (Democratic) 25.57%; ▌Jim Bennett (United Utah) 9.30%; ▌Sean Whalen (Independent) 3.08%; ▌Joe Buchman (Libertarian) 2.47%; ▌Jason Christensen (Ind. American) 1.55%

== Kansas's 4th congressional district ==
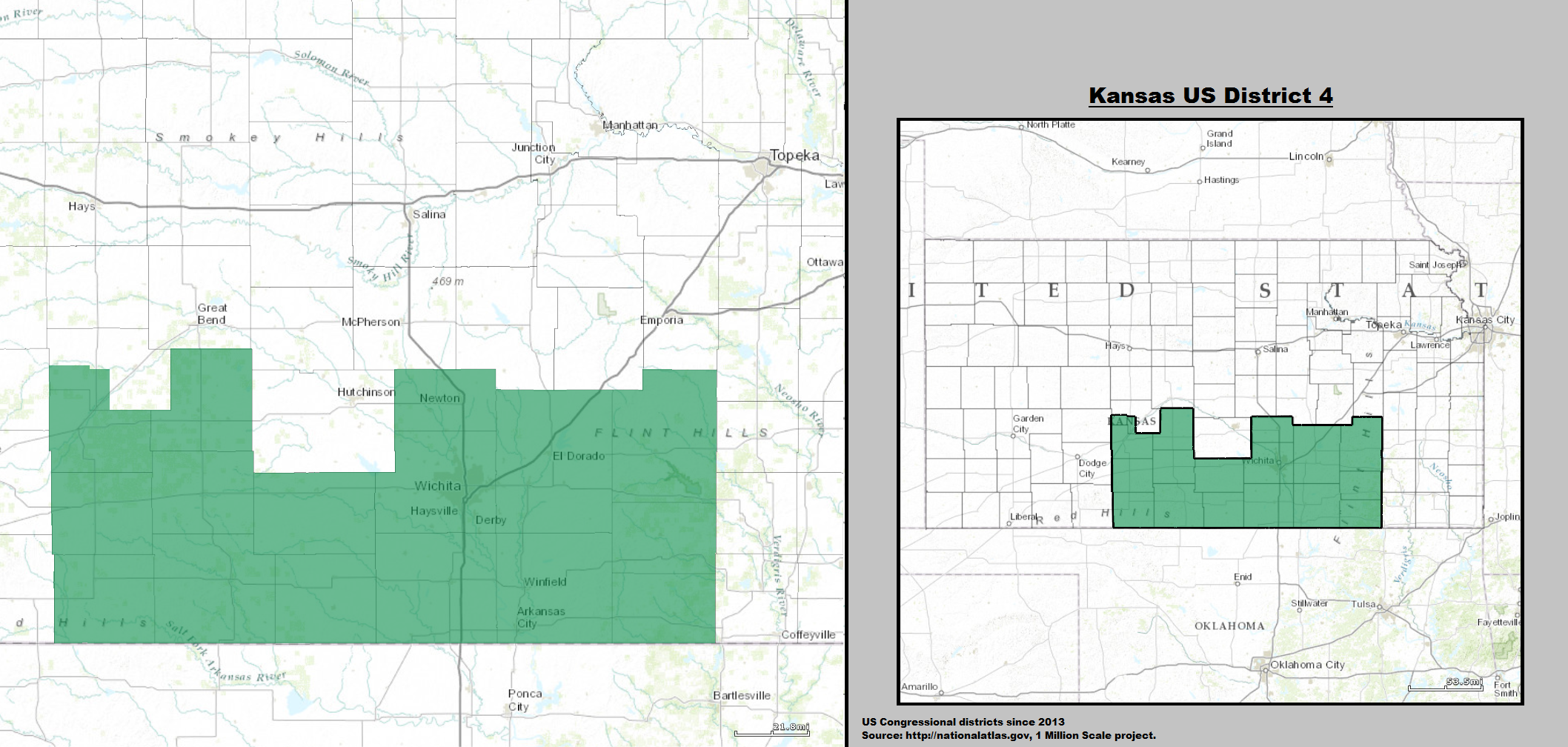
Kansas's 4th congressional district

2017 Kansas's 4th congressional district special election
Party	Candidate	Votes	%	±%
Republican	Ron Estes	64,044	52.2%	−8.5%
Democratic	James Thompson	56,435	46.0%	+16.4%
Libertarian	Chris Rockhold	2,115	1.7%	−1.1%
Total votes		122,594	100.0%	
Republican hold				

== Montana's at-large congressional district ==
Montana's at-large congressional district special election, 2017
Party	Candidate	Votes	%	±%
Republican	Greg Gianforte	190,520	49.95%	−6.24%
Democratic	Rob Quist	169,214	44.37%	+3.82%
Libertarian	Mark Wicks	21,682	5.68%	+2.42%
Total votes		381,416	100.0%	N/A
Republican hold				

== California's 34th congressional district ==
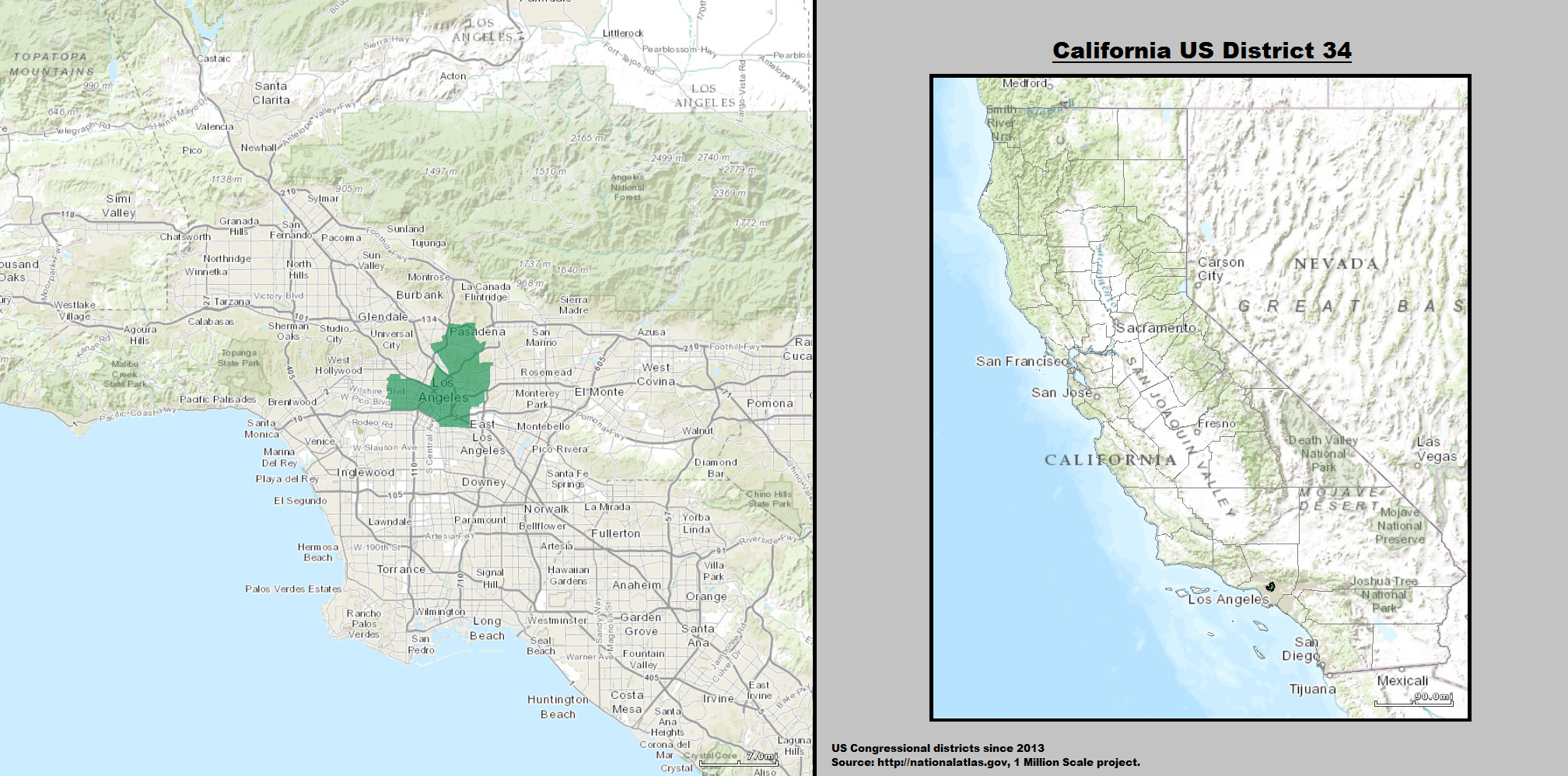
California's 34th congressional district

California's 34th congressional district special general election, 2017
Party	Candidate	Votes	%
Democratic	Jimmy Gomez	25,569	59.22%
Democratic	Robert Lee Ahn	17,610	40.78%
Total votes		43,179	100.00%
Democratic hold			

== Georgia's 6th congressional district ==
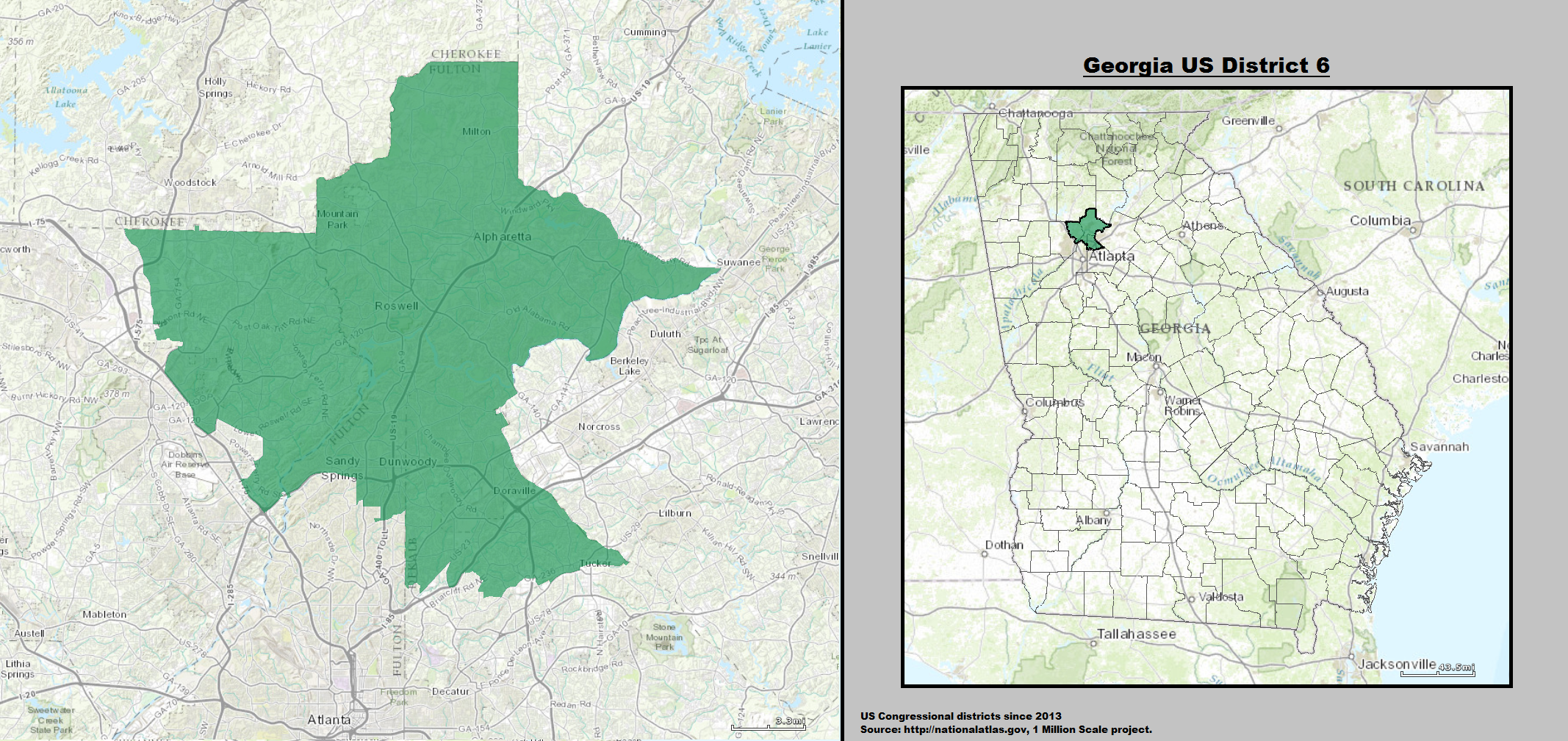
Georgia's 6th congressional district

Georgia's 6th congressional district special election (2017)
Party	Candidate	Votes	%	±%
Republican	Karen Handel	134,799	51.78%	−9.90%
Democratic	Jon Ossoff	125,517	48.22%	+9.90%
Total votes		260,316	100.0%	
Majority		9,282	3.57%	−19.8%
Turnout		260,455	58.16%	
Republican hold				

== South Carolina's 5th congressional district ==
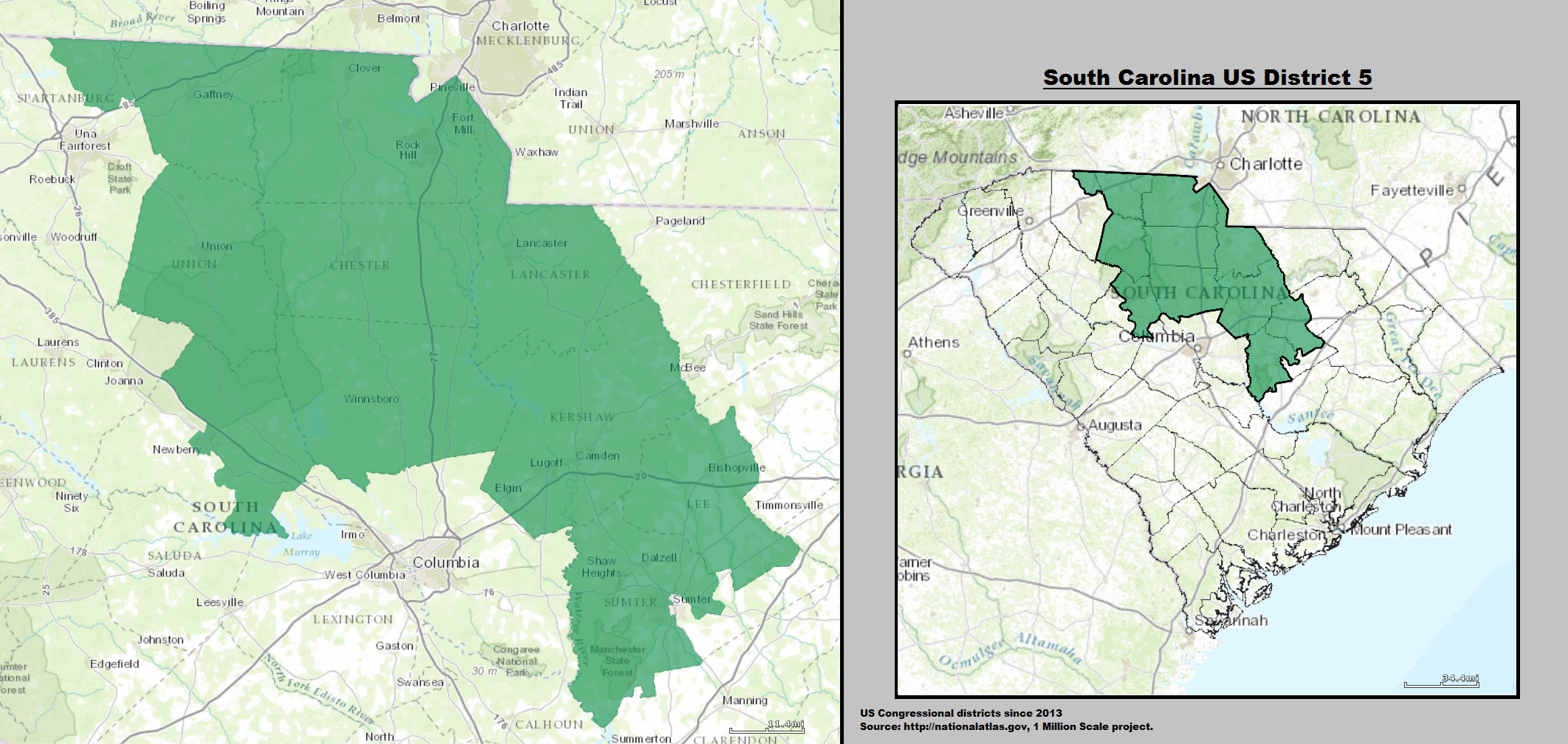
South Carolina's 5th congressional district

South Carolina's 5th congressional district special election, 2017
Party	Candidate	Votes	%	±%
Republican	Ralph Norman	45,076	51.04%	−8.03%
Democratic	Archie Parnell	42,341	47.94%	+9.17%
American	Josh Thornton	319	0.36%	−1.74%
Libertarian	Victor Kocher	273	0.31%	N/A
Green	David Kulma	242	0.27%	N/A
Write-In	Write-in	65	0.07%	+0.31%
Total votes		88,316	100.0%	
Republican hold				

== Utah's 3rd congressional district ==
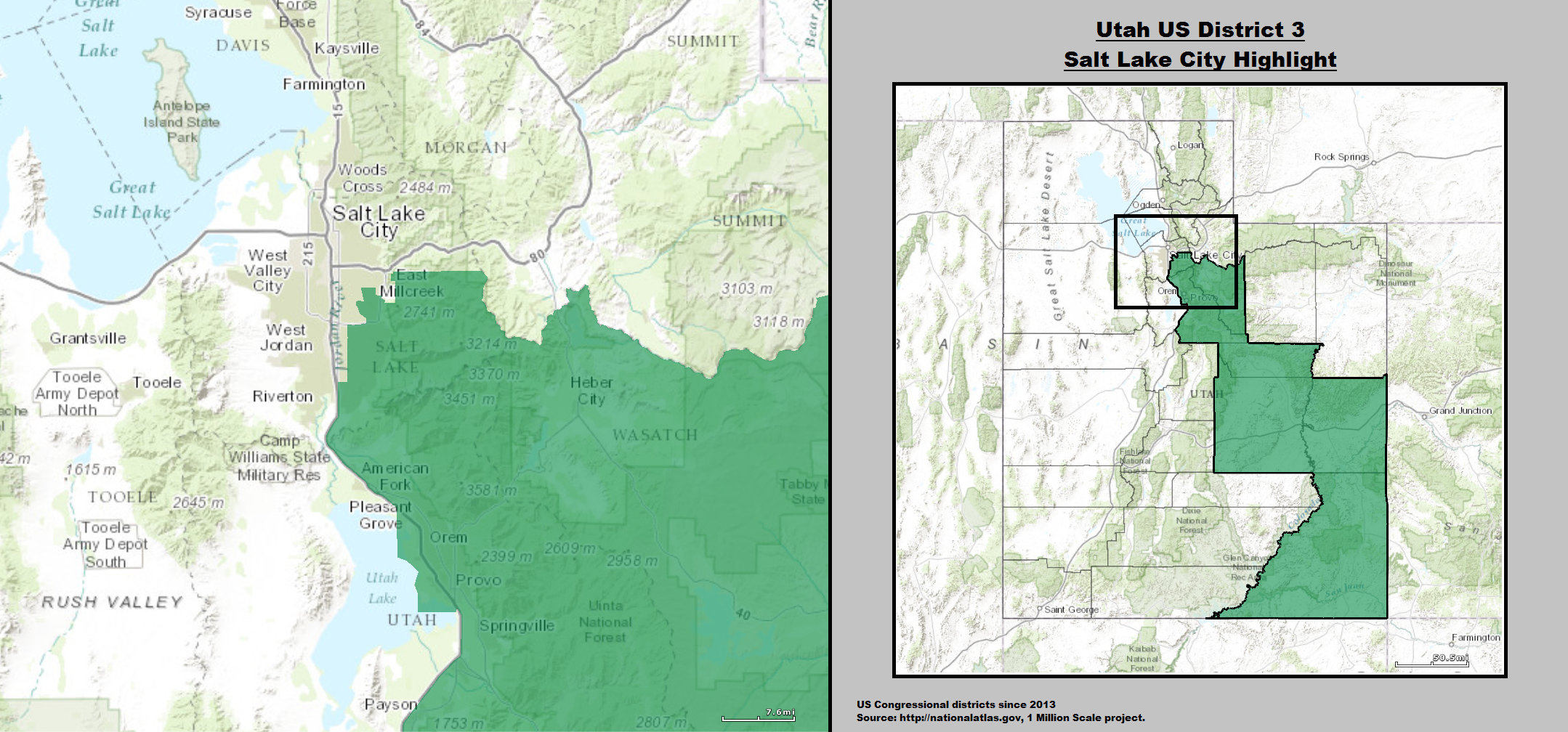
Utah's 3rd congressional district

Utah's 3rd congressional district special election, 2017
Party	Candidate	Votes	%
Republican	John Curtis	85,739	58.03%
Democratic	Kathie Allen	37,778	25.57%
United Utah	Jim Bennett	13,745	9.30%
Independent	Sean Whalen	4,550	3.08%
Libertarian	Joe Buchman	3,643	2.47%
Independent American	Jason Christensen	2,286	1.55%
Write-in	Brendan Phillips	—	—
Write-in	Russell Paul Roesler	—	—
Total votes		147,741	100.00%
Republican hold			
