= Park 'N Fly =

Airport parking operator in United States

Park 'N Fly, Inc.
- Company type: Subsidiary
- Industry: Parking
- Founded: 1967; 58 years ago
- Defunct: 2024
- Fate: Acquired by The Parking Spot
- Headquarters: Atlanta
- Area served: United States
- Key people: Tony Paalz, CEO

Park 'N Fly was an off-airport parking operator based in the United States, established in 1967 in St. Louis, Missouri by Theodore P (Ted) Desloge, a prominent member of the magnate family. This Atlanta, Georgia-headquartered company was acquired in 1988 by the Dutch firm BCD Group.

Operating for 56 years across 12 markets, Park 'N Fly boasted 13 facilities and 80 affiliate locations, offering a spectrum of services ranging from valet parking and car detailing to pet boarding and online reservations. Park 'N Fly has developed an extensive network of off-airport parking services at over 67 airports throughout the United States via its Internet-based reservation system, known as the Park 'N Fly Network.

The trademark "Park 'N Fly" has been registered by the company. This registration was affirmed as more than a descriptive trademark by the United States Supreme Court in the case of Park 'N Fly, Inc. v. Dollar Park & Fly, Inc., a decision rendered in 1985.

On February 6, 2024, Park 'N Fly was acquired by Chicago-based competitor The Parking Spot, with Park 'N Fly locations ultimately taking on The Parking Spot branding.

== Airport Locations ==
Location Type	Locations
Park 'N Fly Location	Atlanta, Cleveland, Dallas, Houston,Hartford, Minneapolis, Chicago, Miami, Oakland, Philadelphia, San Francisco
Affiliate Network	Albany, Albuquerque, Anchorage, Austin, Birmingham, Boston, Buffalo, Burbank, Burlington, Charleston, Chattanooga, Chicago (MDW & ORD), Cincinnati, Columbus, Dallas, Dayton, Denver, Des Moines, Detroit, Hartford, Houston-Hobby, Indianapolis, Las Vegas, Little Rock, Louisville, Memphis, Miami, Montgomery, Nashville, New York (JFK & LGA), Newark, Oklahoma City, Omaha, Philadelphia, Phoenix, Pittsburgh, Portland, Providence, Raleigh-Durham, Reno, Richmond, Salt Lake City, San Antonio, San Jose, Seattle, Spokane, Springfield, St. Louis, Tampa, Tucson, Tulsa

== See also ==
- Park 'N Fly Airport Parking
