= 2017 California's 34th congressional district special election =

- June 6, 2017

California's 34th congressional district
- Turnout: 14.27%
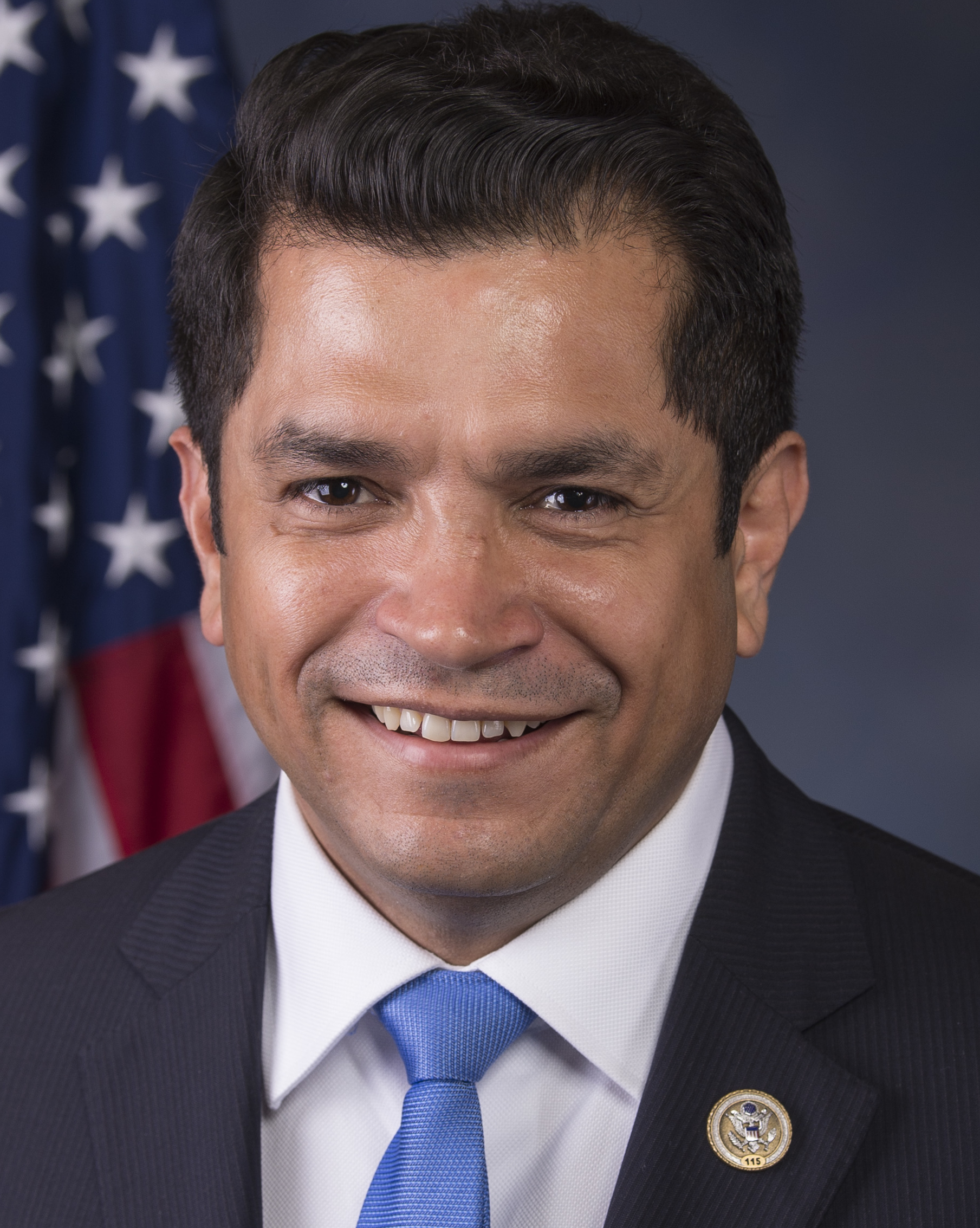

Candidate	Jimmy Gomez	Robert Lee Ahn
Party	Democratic	Democratic
Popular vote	25,569	17,610
Percentage	59.2%	40.8%
- Map key Gomez: 20–30% 60–70% Ahn: 30–40% 40–50% 50–60% 60–70%
U.S. Representative before election
Xavier Becerra
Democratic
Elected U.S. Representative
Jimmy Gomez
Democratic

A special election was held on June 6, 2017, to elect the member of the United States House of Representatives for California's 34th congressional district. A special open primary election was held on April 4, 2017.

Incumbent Representative Xavier Becerra, nominated by Governor Jerry Brown to succeed Kamala Harris, was confirmed as Attorney General of California on January 23, 2017. Harris, who was elected to the United States Senate to succeed Barbara Boxer, resigned as attorney general on January 3, 2017.

Democrats Jimmy Gomez and Robert Lee Ahn advanced to the runoff. Gomez defeated Ahn 59.22% to 40.78%.

== Candidates ==
=== Democratic Party ===
Upon the announcement of incumbent representative Xavier Becerra's selection as Attorney General of California, John Pérez, the former Speaker of the California State Assembly, announced his candidacy to succeed him in the House of Representatives. He soon withdrew from the race, citing a recent health diagnosis.

==== Declared ====
- Robert Lee Ahn, attorney and Los Angeles City planning commissioner
- Vanessa Aramayo, former congressional aide and former California Assembly aide
- Maria Cabildo, former Los Angeles City planning commissioner and director of homeless initiatives at the LA County Community Development Commission & Housing Authority, Co-founder of East LA Community Corporation
- Alejandra Campoverdi, former White House aide for U.S. President Barack Obama
- Arturo Carmona, former Bernie Sanders presidential campaign staff member
- Wendy Carrillo, labor activist and radio host
- Ricardo De La Fuente, businessman and son of 2016 presidential candidate Rocky De La Fuente
- Yolie Flores, former Los Angeles Unified School District board member
- Melissa "Sharkie" Garza, filmmaker and businesswoman
- Jimmy Gomez, state assemblyman
- Sara Hernandez, former public school teacher, attorney, nonprofit founder, and former district director and special counsel to LA City Council Member Jose Huizar.
- Steven Mac, Los Angeles County Deputy District Attorney
- Sandra Mendoza, candidate for the State Assembly in 2014 and 2016
- Raymond Meza, SEIU labor organizer
- Armando Sotomayor, activist
- Richard Joseph Sullivan, attorney
- Tracy Van Houten, aerospace engineer
- Tenaya Wallace, public relations strategist

==== Withdrew ====
- John Pérez, former Speaker of the California State Assembly
- Dr. Jason Ahn, Physician at UCLA

==== Declined ====
- Gil Cedillo, Los Angeles City Councilman
- Kevin de León, State Senator and President pro tempore of the California State Senate
- Monica Garcia, Los Angeles School Board member
- José Huizar, Los Angeles City Councilman
- Jesse Leon, aide to Los Angeles City Councilman José Huizar
- Holly Mitchell, state senator
- Nick Pacheco, former Los Angeles City Councilman and candidate for Los Angeles County District Attorney in 2004
- David Ryu, Los Angeles City Councilman
- Miguel Santiago, state assemblyman

=== Republican Party ===
==== Declared ====
- William Rodriguez Morrison, apartment building manager and perennial candidate

=== Green Party ===
==== Declared ====
- Kenneth Mejia, certified public accountant and candidate for this seat in 2016

=== Libertarian Party ===
==== Declared ====
- Angela McArdle, litigation paralegal and legal aide

=== Independents ===
==== Declared ====
- Mark Padilla, law office administrator

== General election ==
=== Endorsements ===
Wendy Carrillo (D)

Politicians

- Lucy Flores, former member of Nevada State Assembly and Bernie Sanders surrogate

Activists

- National co-chairs and organizers of the 2017 Women's March

Organizations

- Democracy For America
Maria Cabildo (D)

Newspapers

- Los Angeles Times
Arturo Carmona (D)

Celebrities

- Danny Glover, actor and film director

Organizations

- National Nurses United, progressive union organization
Jimmy Gomez (D)

Federal politicians

- Kamala Harris, United States Senator from California
- Pete Aguilar, United States Representative from California's 31st congressional district
- Xavier Becerra, Attorney General of California and former United States Representative from California's 34th congressional district
- Ruben Gallego, United States Representative from Arizona's 7th congressional district
- Raúl Grijalva, United States Representative from Arizona's 3rd congressional district
- Grace Napolitano, United States Representative from California's 32nd congressional district
- Juan Vargas, United States Representative from California's 51st congressional district
- Filemon Vela Jr., United States Representative from Texas's 34th congressional district
- Hilda Solis, Former United States Secretary of Labor under Barack Obama

Statewide Politicians

- Kevin de León, President pro tempore of the California State Senate
- Anthony Rendon, Speaker of the California Assembly

Citywide Politicians

- Gil Cedillo, Member of the Los Angeles City Council
- Eric Garcetti, Mayor of Los Angeles

Organizations

- California Democratic Party
Robert Lee Ahn (D)

Current and Former Elected Officials

- David Ryu, LA City Councilman
- Mark Keam, Virginia House of Delegates
- Rick Tuttle, Retired LA City Controller
- Mike Honda, Retired Congress member
- Warren Furutani, Retired Assemblymember

Athletes

- Jason Collins, former National Basketball Association player

Organizations

- Korean American Democratic Committee

=== Polling ===
Poll source	Date(s) administered	Sample size	Margin of error	Wendy Carrillo (D)	Jimmy Gomez (D)	Sara Hernandez (D)	William Rodriguez Morrison (R)	Other / Undecided
FM3 Research (D-Hernandez)	February 11–14, 2017	500	± 4.4%	5%	20%	9%	5%	61%

=== Results ===
California's 34th congressional district special election, 2017
Party	Candidate	Votes	%
Democratic	Jimmy Gomez	10,728	25.5
Democratic	Robert Lee Ahn	9,415	22.2
Democratic	Maria Cabildo	4,259	10.1
Democratic	Sara Hernandez	2,358	5.6
Democratic	Arturo Carmona	2,205	5.2
Democratic	Wendy Carrillo	2,195	5.2
Green	Kenneth Mejia	1,964	4.6
Democratic	Yolie Flores	1,368	3.2
Republican	William Morrison	1,360	3.2
Democratic	Tracy Van Houten	1,042	2.5
Democratic	Alejandra Campoverdi	1,001	2.4
Democratic	Vanessa Aramayo	853	2.0
Democratic	Sandra Mendoza	674	1.6
Democratic	Steven Mac	663	1.6
Democratic	Raymond Meza	509	1.2
No party preference	Mark Edward Padilla	427	1.0
Democratic	Ricardo De La Fuente	331	0.8
Libertarian	Angela McArdle	319	0.7
Democratic	Adrienne Nicole Edwards	182	0.4
Democratic	Richard Joseph Sullivan	155	0.4
Democratic	Armando Sotomayor	118	0.3
Democratic	Tenaya Wallace	103	0.2
Democratic	Melissa "Sharkie" Garza	79	0.2
Democratic	Michelle Walker (write-in)	0	0.0
Total votes		42,308	100.0

== Runoff ==
=== Endorsements ===
Jimmy Gomez (D)

Federal politicians

- Kamala Harris, United States Senator from California
- Pete Aguilar, United States Representative from California's 31st congressional district
- Xavier Becerra, Attorney General of California and former United States Representative from California's 34th congressional district
- Ruben Gallego, United States Representative from Arizona's 7th congressional district
- Raúl Grijalva, United States Representative from Arizona's 3rd congressional district
- Grace Napolitano, United States Representative from California's 32nd congressional district
- Juan Vargas, United States Representative from California's 51st congressional district
- Filemon Vela Jr., United States Representative from Texas's 34th congressional district
- Hilda Solis, Former United States Secretary of Labor under Barack Obama

Statewide Politicians

- Kevin de León, President pro tempore of the California State Senate
- Anthony Rendon, Speaker of the California Assembly

Citywide Politicians

- Gil Cedillo, Member of the Los Angeles City Council
- Eric Garcetti, Mayor of Los Angeles

Organizations

- California Democratic Party
- Our Revolution
Robert Lee Ahn (D)

Current and Former Elected Officials

- David Ryu, LA City Councilman
- Mark Keam, Virginia House of Delegates
- Rick Tuttle, Retired LA City Controller
- Mike Honda, Retired Congress member
- Warren Furutani, Retired Assemblymember

Athletes

- Jason Collins, former National Basketball Association player

Organizations

- Korean American Democratic Committee

=== Results ===
California's 34th congressional district special general election, 2017
Party	Candidate	Votes	%	±%
Democratic	Jimmy Gomez	25,569	59.2	N/A
Democratic	Robert Lee Ahn	17,610	40.8	N/A
Total votes		43,179	100.0	N/A
Democratic hold				

== See also ==
- List of special elections to the United States House of Representatives
- 2016 United States House of Representatives elections in California
- 2017 United States House of Representatives elections
