= Alejandra Campoverdi =

American politician

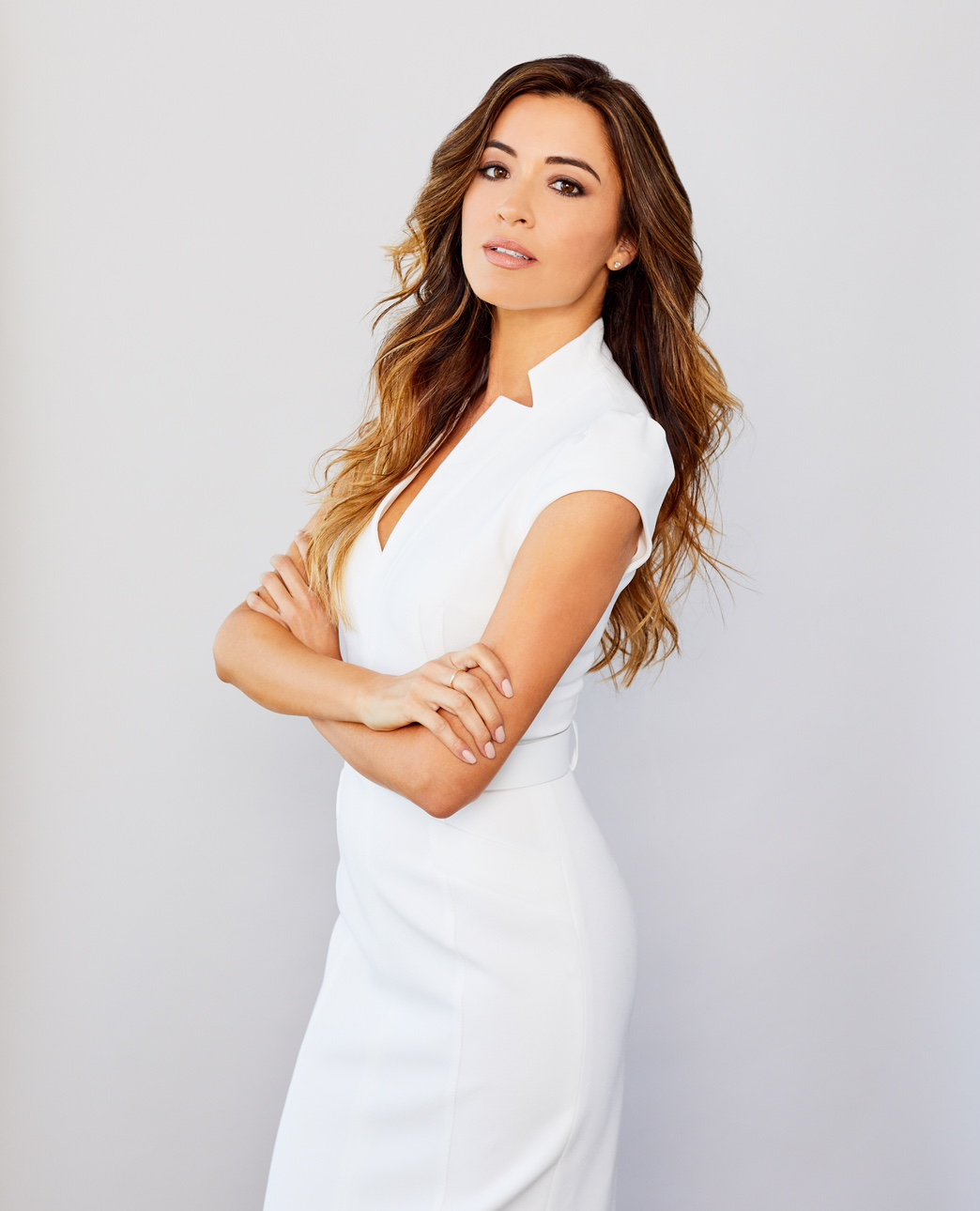
- Campoverdi in 2018

White House Deputy Director of Hispanic Media
- In office 2009–2012
- President: Barack Obama

Personal details
- Born: Alejandra Campoverdi; September 20, 1979 (age 47) Los Angeles, California, U.S.
- Education: University of Southern California (BA); Harvard University (MPP)
- Website: alejandracampoverdi.com

Alejandra Campoverdi (born September 20, 1979) is an American women’s health advocate, best-selling author, and former White House aide. Under President Barack Obama, Campoverdi was the first White House Deputy Director of Hispanic Media.

== Early life and education ==
Born in Los Angeles, Campoverdi was raised by a single mother and her grandmother who immigrated to the United States from Mexico. Alejandra spent her childhood sharing a cramped apartment in Santa Monica with extended family.

There were periods when Campoverdi's family was on welfare, WIC, and Medi-Cal, California’s public health insurance program. A strong academic performer, Alejandra attended Saint Monica Catholic High School on financial assistance and with the support of non-profits and pipeline programs.

While paying her way through school, Campoverdi graduated cum laude from the Annenberg School for Communication and Journalism at the University of Southern California. Campoverdi worked as a part-time actress and model—among other jobs—during her time at USC to pay for her education. She later received her Master of Public Policy from the Kennedy School of Government at Harvard University.

== Career ==
Following her master's degree, Campoverdi was hired by then-Senator Barack Obama's 2008 presidential campaign, to work in the Chicago headquarters. Campoverdi's focus during the campaign was outreach to various constituent groups, including the Latino community.

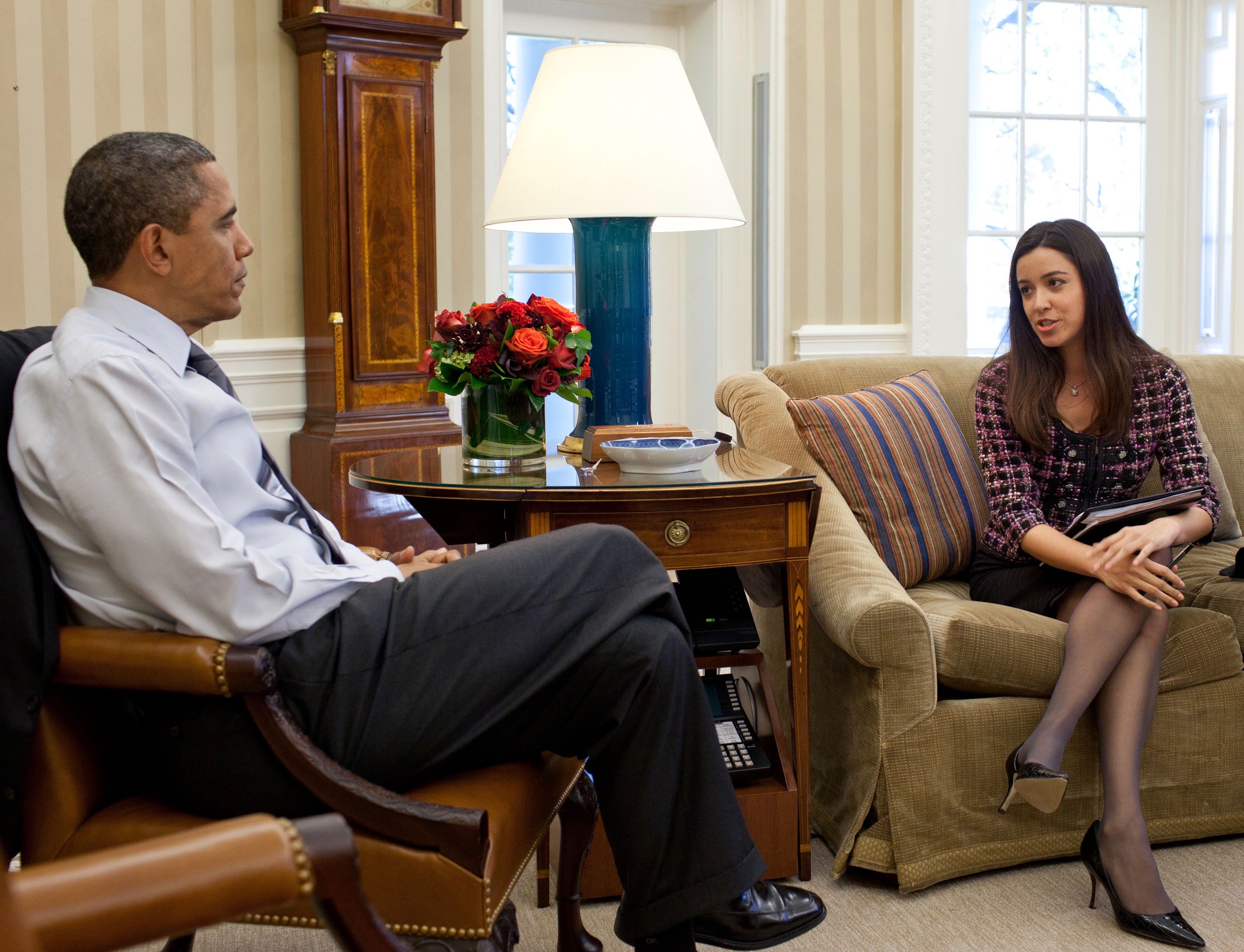
Alejandra Campoverdi briefs President Obama in the Oval Office

Following Obama's victory, Campoverdi was appointed to work in the West Wing of the White House as Special Assistant to the White House Deputy Chief of Staff for Policy, Mona Sutphen. She later became the first ever White House Deputy Director of Hispanic Media. In the latter role, Campoverdi developed and implemented the White House’s communications strategy directed towards the Hispanic community and briefed President Obama in preparation for interviews with Hispanic media.

After departing the White House, Campoverdi held various senior leadership roles in media, including at Univision and the Los Angeles Times.

In December 2016, Campoverdi announced that she would seek the nomination of the Democratic Party in the 34th congressional district special election, to replace Xavier Becerra, who had been appointed to succeed Kamala Harris as Attorney General of California. In the April 4, 2017 primary election, Campoverdi did not make the run-off, and former California Assembly member Jimmy Gomez was elected.

=== Boards ===
Alejandra Campoverdi has served or currently serves on the Boards of Harvard’s Shorenstein Center on Media, Politics and Public Policy, the California Community Foundation, the Harvard Journal of Hispanic Policy, UCLA's Center for Diverse Leadership in Science, and the Friends of the National Museum of the American Latino, and she is a member of the Pacific Council on International Policy.

In 2017, Campoverdi was appointed to serve as a Commissioner for the California Children and Families Commission, also known as First 5 California. The Commission is a statewide body that is dedicated to improving the lives of California’s youngest citizens and their families through a multi-faceted approach that includes education, health services, childcare, and other vital programs.

Previously, she was a volunteer teacher for InsideOUT Writers, through which she taught a weekly creative writing class to incarcerated youth in Los Angeles’ Central Juvenile Hall.

== Women's health advocacy ==
In March 2017, Campoverdi revealed in a profile by The Washington Post that she inherited the BRCA2 gene mutation, giving her an 85% risk of developing breast cancer, and that she planned to have a preventive double mastectomy to lower risk to under 3%.

Campoverdi made the protection of access to affordable healthcare and the Affordable Care Act a focus of her congressional campaign, choosing to speak publicly about her personal health in an effort to bring attention to the stakes of limited access to healthcare.

In 2017, Campoverdi was awarded Penn Medicine's Basser Center for BRCA's inaugural YLC Distinguished Advocacy Award for her advocacy around BRCA-related cancers.

The following year, Alejandra underwent surgery to lower her risk, which caught can early stage non-invasive breast cancer that had been previously undetected in scans. Because of her preventive surgery, Campoverdi did not need to do any additional treatment.

Campoverdi founded LATINX & BRCA in partnership with Penn Medicine's Basser Center for BRCA, which is the first awareness campaign on the BRCA gene mutation that targets Latinos and offers Spanish-language educational materials.

=== PBS documentary, Inheritance ===
In 2020, Campoverdi produced and appeared in the PBS documentary Inheritance. Named one of the “Best Documentaries of 2020” by ELLE, Inheritance follows three women's experience with hereditary breast cancer and the BRCA gene mutation, as they undergo life-altering medical procedures in the hope of reducing their risk and saving their own lives.

== FIRST GEN (memoir) ==
In 2023, Campoverdi published her memoir, FIRST GEN, which exams the emotional toll of social mobility on those who are "First and Onlys." using her own story as a frame. Described as "part memoir, part manifesto," FIRST GEN's major themes address "generational inheritance, aspiration, and belonging" for those who are trailblazers of all kinds.

FIRST GEN is a two-time national best-seller, and has won multiple book awards including the Martin Cruz Smith Award from the California Independent Booksellers Alliance, and the Dolores Huerta Award from the International Latino Book Awards. Campoverdi was also named the 2024 Rising Star (Nonfiction) by the International Latino Book Awards.

FIRST GEN was chosen as the 2024 Opportunity Matters Book Club selection for the Council for Opportunity in Education (COE), a national book club for first-generation and low-income students at colleges and universities across the country.
