= Mona Sutphen =

American politician

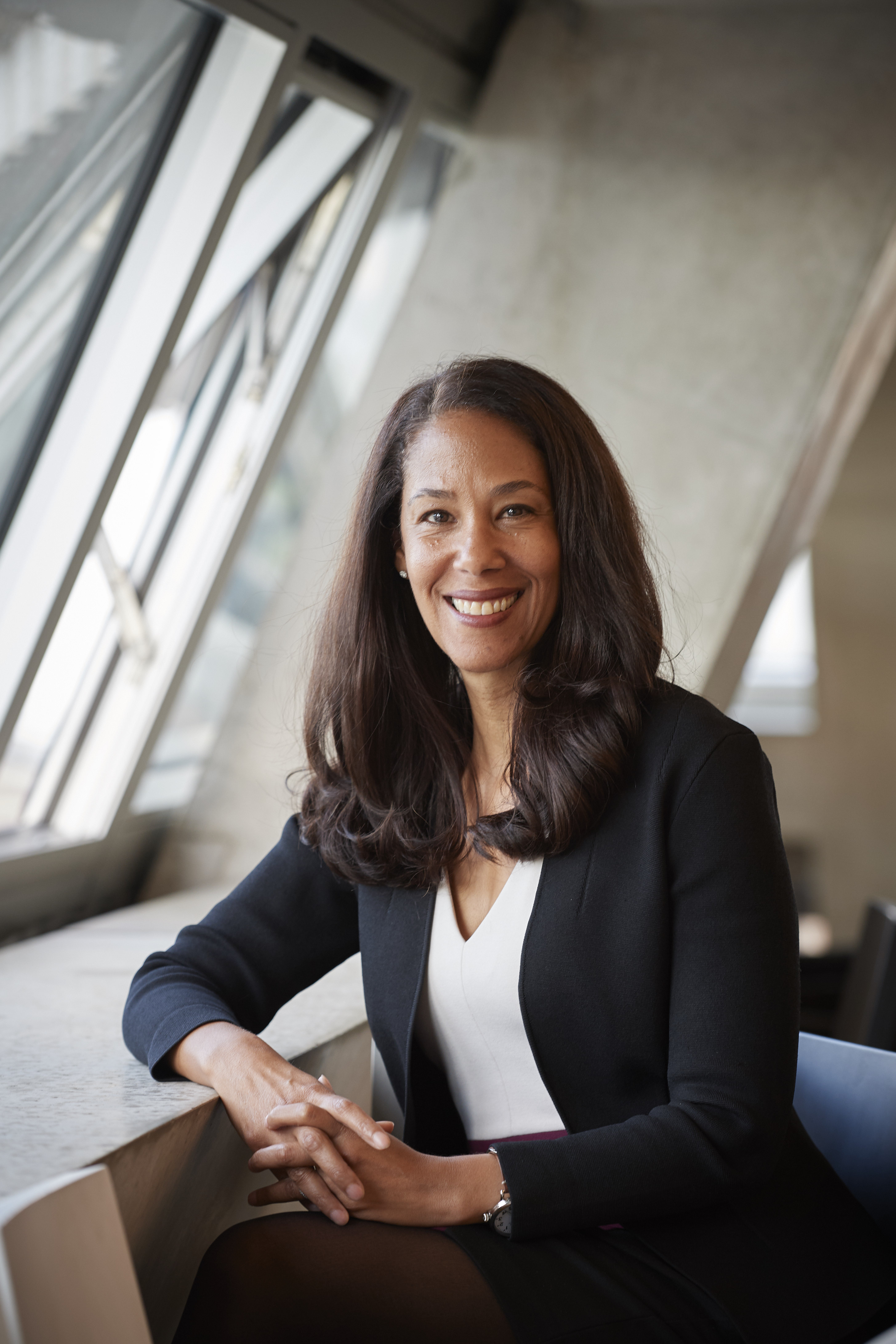

White House Deputy Chief of Staff for Policy
- In office January 20, 2009 – January 26, 2011
- President: Barack Obama
- Preceded by: Joel Kaplan
- Succeeded by: Nancy-Ann DeParle

Personal details
- Born: November 10, 1967 (age 59)
- Party: Democratic
- Spouse: Clyde Williams
- Children: 2
- Education: Mount Holyoke College (BA); London School of Economics (MSc)

Mona K. Sutphen (born November 10, 1967) was the White House Deputy Chief of Staff for Policy in the Obama administration from 2009 to 2011. She is currently a Senior Partner and Head of Investment Strategies at The Vistria Group, a Chicago-based private equity firm founded by Marty Nesbitt and Kip Kirkpatrick. From 2013 to 2019, she was a partner in Macro Advisory Partners LLP and from 2011 to 2013 was a managing director at UBS AG, covering geopolitical risk, macro-policy trends and their impact on the global economy. She held a diplomatic position in the National Security Council during the Clinton Administration.

== Background ==
Sutphen is from Milwaukee, Wisconsin and graduated from John Marshall High School there. Her mother was Jewish and her father African American.

She earned her B.A. in international relations in 1989 from Mount Holyoke College and an M.Sc. from the London School of Economics.

From 2001 to 2008, Sutphen was managing director of Stonebridge International, a Washington-based business strategy consulting firm that works with multinational corporations, financial institutions and other organizations on challenges worldwide. She was also Vice President of Currenex, a United States Foreign Service officer in the Clinton White House (1991–2000) and member of the National Security Council (1998–2000). She then worked at the State Department's Bureau of Democracy, Human Rights, and Labor and at the U.S. Embassy in Bangkok.

Sutphen is a Trustee of Mount Holyoke College and on the advisory board of the Columbia Center for Global Energy Policy. She previously was an adjunct professor at the Woodrow Wilson School of Public and International Affairs and is the co-author (with Nina Hachigian) of The Next American Century: How the U.S. Can Thrive as Other Powers Rise.

== Other positions ==
- Munich Security Conference (MSC), Member of the Security Innovation Board (since 2021)
- Spotify, Board Member (since 2021)
- Warner Music Group / Blavatnik Family Foundation Social Justice Fund, Member of the Board of Trustees (since 2020)
- Council on Foreign Relations, Member
- Putnam Mutual Funds, Member of the Board of Trustees
- International Rescue Committee (IRC), Member of the Board of Directors

== Personal life ==
Sutphen is married to Clyde Williams, who was President Bill Clinton's domestic policy advisor at his Foundation, as vice president at the Center for American Progress, and as the Democratic National Committee's political director. They married in 2001 and have two children.

== Works ==
Hachigian, Nina and Sutphen, Mona. The Next American Century: How the U.S. Can Thrive as Other Powers Rise, Simon & Schuster (January 8, 2008) ISBN 978-0-7432-9099-9
