= Kenneth Mejia =

Los Angeles City Controller (born 1990)

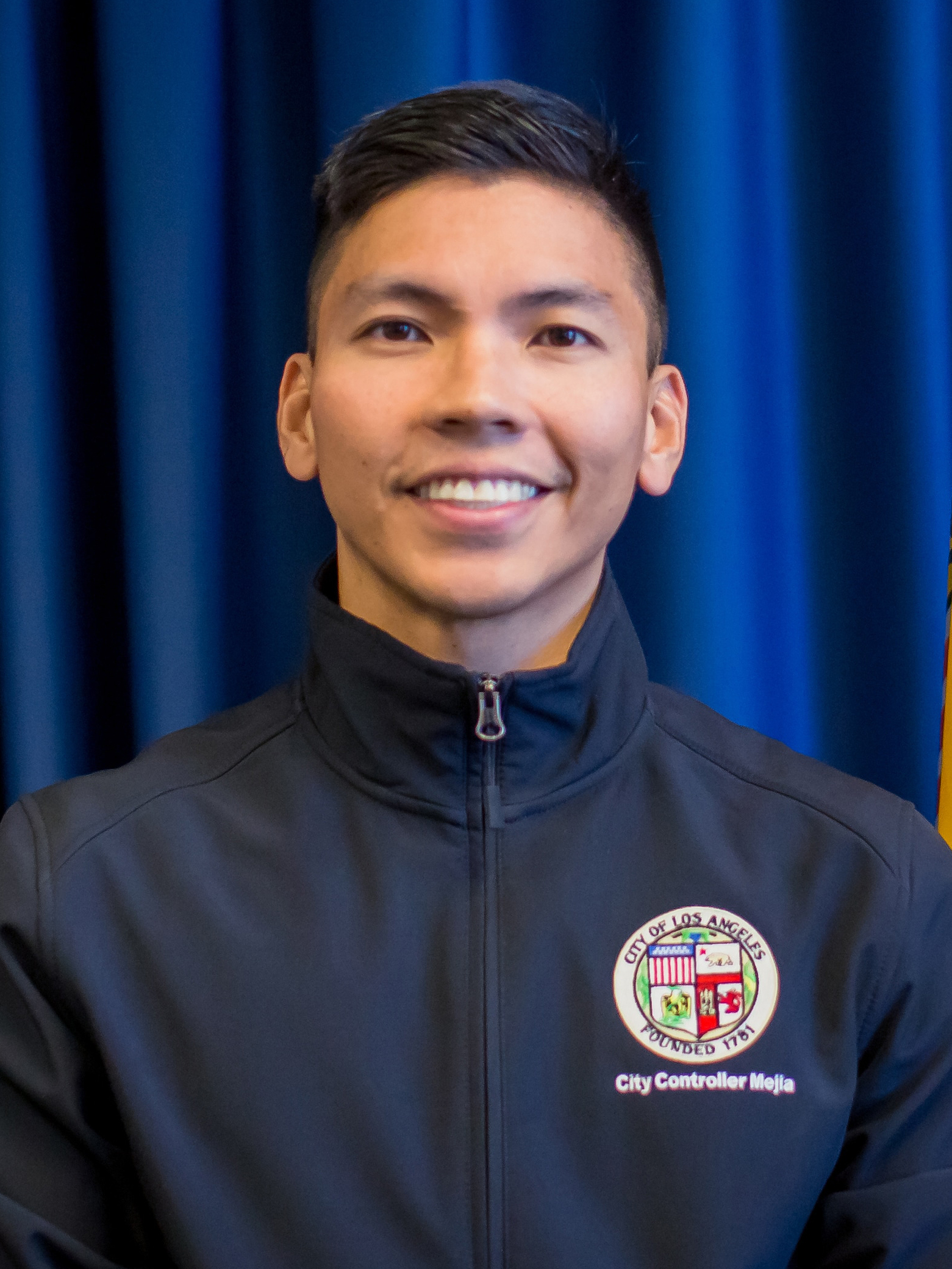
- Official portrait, 2023

20th City Controller of Los Angeles
- Incumbent
- Assumed office December 12, 2022
- Mayor: Karen Bass
- Preceded by: Ron Galperin

Personal details
- Born: November 7, 1990 (age 36) Los Angeles, California, U.S.
- Party: Green (2017–2021, 2025–present); Democratic (before 2017, 2021–2024); Independent (2024–2025)
- Other political affiliations: Working Families
- Education: Woodbury University (BS)

Kenneth Mejia (born November 7, 1990) is an American activist, accountant, and politician, serving as the City Controller of Los Angeles since 2022. Mejia was a three-time candidate for the United States House of Representatives in California's 34th congressional district, prior to his candidacy and subsequent election as City Controller in 2022.

Elected to succeed Ron Galperin, Mejia is the first Filipino American elected official in the city of Los Angeles, the first Asian American elected to a citywide office, the youngest, and the first nonwhite person to hold the position of City Controller in over a century.

== Early life and career ==
Mejia is Filipino-American and was born and raised in Los Angeles. Mejia graduated from Woodbury University in two and a half years, finishing in 2010 with a B.S. in accounting.

Mejia has held his Certified Public Accountant (CPA) designation since around 2013, although the status of his CPA license was "expired" or "inactive" from November 2018 until January 2022. He worked at Ernst & Young but left in 2014. He then worked for a hedge fund according to his Twitter account, which he left May 6, 2016, to focus on his campaign. In 2016, he co-founded We Can Make a Difference, a community volunteer organization that provided food and hygiene items to low-income and homeless people in Los Angeles. He then worked at EVgo but left in late 2021 to focus on campaigning. Mejia is a member of the Los Angeles Tenants Union.

== Early political campaigns ==
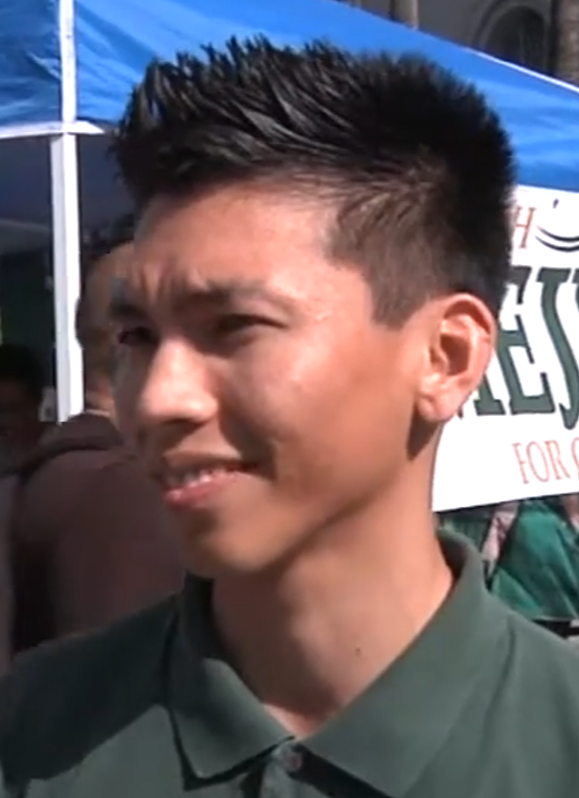
Mejia campaigning for Congress in 2017

=== California's 34th congressional district ===
Mejia was inspired by the 2016 presidential campaign of Bernie Sanders to engage more in politics, leading him to become a candidate to the California delegation to the Democratic National Convention. Mejia was a write-in Democratic Party candidate in California's 34th congressional district in 2016.

Having grown disenchanted with the Democratic Party, Mejia ran as a U.S. Green Party candidate in the same district in 2017 and 2018. His 2017 bid was noted for its reliance on small-dollar donations. Mejia's 2018 bid advanced to the general election and yielded more than 40,000 votes, setting the record for the highest vote percentage cast for any Green candidate against a Democrat for Congress. Mejia continued to work as an accountant while campaigning in 2018.

== Los Angeles City Controller (2022—present) ==
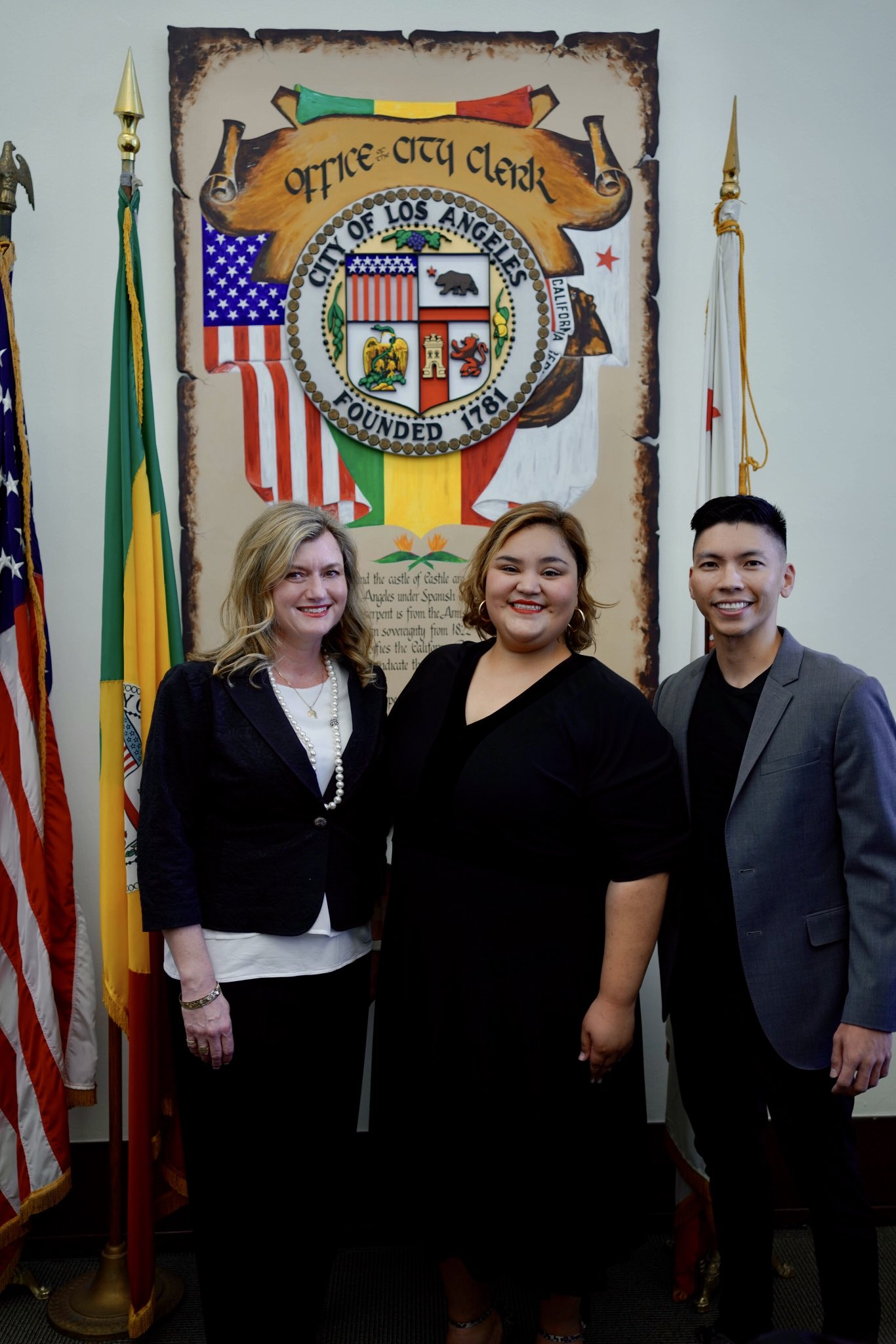
Mejia (right) with Eunisses Hernandez (center) and Holly Wolcott, 2022

=== Elections ===
==== 2022 ====
Mejia announced his candidacy for City Controller, a nonpartisan office, in the 2022 Los Angeles elections. It has been historically uncommon for the city controller to have extensive accounting experience; Mejia claims the office has never been held by a CPA. He was the only city candidate in 2022 to receive ballot access through signatures alone. During his candidacy, Mejia drew attention to Los Angeles Fire Department employees receiving more than half a million dollars a year, the use of about half of the city's funds from the American Rescue Plan on the Los Angeles Police Department, and the amount of police funding in the budget proposed in 2022 by Mayor Eric Garcetti.

On June 7, 2022, Mejia took first place in the primary for LA City Controller, with over 230,163 votes. He obtained 42.75% of the vote, while opponents Paul Koretz and Stephanie Clements obtained 23.83% and 16.01%. On November 8, 2022, Mejia won the general election in a landslide with 62% of the vote, defeating Koretz. Mejia received the most votes of any controller candidate in city history.

==== 2026 ====
Mejia ran for re-election in 2026, and initially faced opposition from former state senator Isadore Hall III and capital management executive Zach Sokoloff, before Hall withdrew. Despite Sokoloff gaining the endorsement of the Los Angeles County Democratic Party, Mejia defeated Sokoloff in the primary, earning 63.00% of the vote, and securing a second term as Controller.

=== Tenure ===
Mejia appointed Rick Cole to serve as his Chief Deputy Controller and Sergio Perez to serve as Chief of Accountability and Oversight. Cole is an Urban Studies professor and was the former mayor of Pasadena and deputy mayor for Los Angeles. Sergio Perez left his position as the Los Angeles Department of Water and Power's Inspector General to serve.

In November 2025, Mejia announced that he had left the Democratic Party in January 2024 and would not seek their endorsement (nor the Republican Party's) for his 2026 reelection campaign, stating: "I couldn’t support a party that preferred to spend our tax dollars on bombs while Americans struggle to put food on the table." The accompanying video referenced American support for Israel in the war in Gaza. It was later confirmed that he had rejoined the Green Party.

== Electoral history ==
=== 2016 California's 34th congressional district election ===
California's 34th congressional district election, 2016
Primary election
Party	Candidate	Votes	%
Democratic	Xavier Becerra (incumbent)	71,982	77.6
Democratic	Adrienne Nicole Edwards	19,624	21.2
Democratic	Kenneth Mejia (write-in)	1,177	1.3
Total votes		92,783	100.0
General election
Democratic	Xavier Becerra (incumbent)	122,842	77.2
Democratic	Adrienne Nicole Edwards	36,314	22.8
Total votes		159,156	100.0
Democratic hold			

=== 2017 California's 34th congressional district special election ===
California's 34th congressional district special election, 2017
Party	Candidate	Votes	%
Democratic	Jimmy Gomez	10,728	25.5
Democratic	Robert Lee Ahn	9,415	22.2
Democratic	Maria Cabildo	4,259	10.1
Democratic	Sara Hernandez	2,358	5.6
Democratic	Arturo Carmona	2,205	5.2
Democratic	Wendy Carrillo	2,195	5.2
Green	Kenneth Mejia	1,964	4.6
Democratic	Yolie Flores	1,368	3.2
Republican	William Morrison	1,360	3.2
Democratic	Tracy Van Houten	1,042	2.5
Democratic	Alejandra Campoverdi	1,001	2.4
Democratic	Vanessa Aramayo	853	2.0
Democratic	Sandra Mendoza	674	1.6
Democratic	Steven Mac	663	1.6
Democratic	Raymond Meza	509	1.2
No party preference	Mark Edward Padilla	427	1.0
Democratic	Ricardo De La Fuente	331	0.8
Libertarian	Angela McArdle	319	0.7
Democratic	Adrienne Nicole Edwards	182	0.4
Democratic	Richard Joseph Sullivan	155	0.4
Democratic	Armando Sotomayor	118	0.3
Democratic	Tenaya Wallace	103	0.2
Democratic	Melissa "Sharkie" Garza	79	0.2
Democratic	Michelle Walker (write-in)	0	0.0
Total votes		42,308	100.0

=== 2018 California's 34th congressional district election ===
California's 34th congressional district election, 2018
Primary election
Party	Candidate	Votes	%
Democratic	Jimmy Gomez (incumbent)	54,661	78.7
Green	Kenneth Mejia	8,987	12.9
Libertarian	Angela Elise McArdle	5,804	8.4
Total votes		69,452	100.0
General election
Democratic	Jimmy Gomez (incumbent)	110,195	72.5
Green	Kenneth Mejia	41,711	27.5
Total votes		151,906	100.0
Democratic hold			

=== 2022 Los Angeles City Controller election ===
2022 Los Angeles City Controller election
Primary election
Candidate	Votes	%
Kenneth Mejia	240,374	43.12
Paul Koretz	131,921	23.67
Stephanie Clements	88,678	15.91
David T. Vahedi	39,240	7.04
James O'Gabhann III	21,984	3.94
Reid Lidow	21,769	3.90
Rob Wilcox	13,460	2.41
Total votes	557,426	100.00
General election
Kenneth Mejia	509,757	63.32%
Paul Koretz	295,338	36.68%
Total votes	805,095	100.00

=== 2026 Los Angeles City Controller election ===
2026 Los Angeles City Controller election
Candidate	Votes	%
Kenneth Mejia (incumbent)	470,793	63.00
Zach Sokoloff	276,524	37.00
Total votes	747,317	100.00
