= Clyde Williams (New York politician) =

American politician

- Born: Washington, DC
- Occupation: Politician
- Political party: Democratic
- Spouse: Mona Sutphen
- Children: 2

Clyde Williams was a candidate for Congress in New York's 13th Congressional District. He was political director of the Democratic National Committee and domestic policy advisor to former President Bill Clinton.

== Early life and education ==
Williams grew up in the Anacostia section of Washington, DC. His father died when he was three years old, and his mother was a public school teacher. He graduated from Howard University with a degree in political science.

== Career ==
Williams began his career working in local politics in Washington, D.C. He joined the Clinton administration in 1998, and served in the White House and as Deputy Chief of Staff of the US Department of Agriculture. At USDA, Williams helped increase access to vital programs, including food stamps, WIC, and school lunches – that support millions of families across the country.

In 2001, Williams moved to Harlem with President Bill Clinton and served as his Domestic Policy Advisor at the William Jefferson Clinton Foundation for four years. At the Clinton Foundation, designed and implementing Harlem-based and national programs to promote economic empowerment and education.

He developed and launched Harlem Small Business Initiative, which brought together leading private sector companies and NYU Stern School of Business to provide technical advice to support small businesses in Harlem.

In 2005, Williams became a vice president at the Center for American Progress, where he continued his work with state and local governments.

In 2009, President Barack Obama appointed Williams as the Political Director of the DNC. After the 2010 Midterm elections, Danny Bakewell, President of the Black Press of America, wrote in an op-ed that the DNC had turned their backs on black voters, and that “the only support we could count on was DNC Political Director, Clyde Williams”.

== Community service ==
Williams serves on the board of the MAC AIDS Fund, where he works closely with the organization to provide funding for programs in the African-American and Latino communities. Previously, he served on the board of STRIVE – an East Harlem-based non-profit that is focused on job training for African-Americans and Latinos.

In 2003, he co‐founded the Harlem Speakers Series to promote dialogue with political leaders. Speakers have included President Bill Clinton, then-Senator Hillary Rodham Clinton, Senator Kirsten Gillibrand, and Mayor Michael Bloomberg.

Williams was the recipient of the Harlem Business Alliance's Community Service Award in 2003.

== Campaigns ==
=== 2012 Congressional bid ===
In 2012, Williams challenged incumbent Congressman Charlie Rangel for New York's 13th District Congressional Seat. Williams attracted high-profile donors and grassroots support. The New York Times and the Daily News endorsed his campaign for Congress.

=== 2016 Congressional bid ===
Williams announced his candidacy for Congress in October 2015. He has received endorsements from former Senate Majority Leader Tom Daschle, and former Governor of New Mexico and leading Latino politician, Bill Richardson.

== Personal life ==
He is married to former White House Deputy Chief of Staff Mona Sutphen; they met in the Situation Room while planning the 1998 Wye River Peace Talks. They currently live in Harlem and have two children.
