= Angela Gonzales-Torres =

American politician (born 1994)

- Gonzales-Torres in 2026

Member-elect of the U.S. House of Representatives from California's 34th district
- Assuming office January 3, 2027
- Succeeding: Jimmy Gomez

Personal details
- Born: 1994 or 1995 (age 31–32) East Los Angeles, California, U.S.
- Party: Democratic
- Other political affiliations: Democratic Socialists of America (Note: The Democratic Socialists of America (DSA) are not a registered political party. Instead, they are a political organization for those with democratic socialist ideologies.)
- Education: Pasadena City College (attended); University of California, Los Angeles (BA)
- Website: Campaign website

Angela Gonzales-Torres (born 1994 /1995) is an American community organizer and politician. A member of the Democratic Party and the Democratic Socialists of America, she was a successful candidate in the 2026 election for California's 34th congressional district. She finished second in California's top-two primary and advanced to the general election against incumbent representative Jimmy Gomez, defeating him.

== Early life ==
Gonzales-Torres was born and raised in East Los Angeles to a Chicano family. Her father was an automobile mechanic and her mother a waitress. When Gonzales-Torres was 15, her father was deported, forcing her mother to raise four children alone. The family experienced housing insecurity and lived in shelters and in their car for months before finding Section 8 housing.

Gonzales-Torres attended high school in the Los Angeles Unified School District, began college in Pasadena City College, and graduated from UCLA with a degree in Chicano studies and anthropology. She worked two jobs while in college, one of which was bartending.

== Career ==
Gonzales-Torres currently works as an academic counselor at Pasadena City College in its Community Overcoming Recidivism through Education (CORE) program, which supports formerly incarcerated students, and as program director for a permanent affordable-housing project in Altadena, which helps older tenants recover from the Eaton Fire.

=== Community work ===
Gonzales-Torres organized in Northeast Los Angeles, where she fought for tenant protections and efforts to prevent displacement.

In 2024, as a UCLA student, Gonzales-Torres joined the UCLA pro-Palestine encampment.

From 2023 to 2025, Gonzales-Torres was president of the Historic Highland Park Neighborhood Council. As HHPNC president, she opposed additional liquor licenses, arguing that bar density in the neighborhood vastly exceeded California Alcoholic Beverage Control guidelines.

== U.S. House of Representatives ==
=== Elections ===
==== 2026 ====
In April 2025, Gonzales-Torres entered the race for California's 34th congressional district, which is centered on East Los Angeles, challenging incumbent Jimmy Gomez. Gonzales-Torres decided to run because she felt Gomez had responded too slowly to the June 2025 mass deportation raids and had failed to provide immigrant communities with "Know Your Rights" workshops, which she grounded in her family's experiences with deportation and housing insecurity. Gonzales-Torres' campaign has led Know Your Rights sessions. She said she was inspired by Zohran Mamdani's campaign for Mayor of New York City, which showed that Democratic voters want politicians who would stand up to "corporate interests" and "fight for their communities' needs". She described the contest as a fight between the working class and the political establishment. Gonzales-Torres is part of the 2026 anti-incumbent progressive wave in Democratic primaries.

Six candidates competed in the June 2 primary. Gomez received about 46 percent of the vote, and Gonzales-Torres received about 30 percent. They advanced to the November 3 general election.

In August, the House Ethics Committee began an inquiry into whether Gomez had engaged in sexual misconduct. One former Gomez staffer accused him of sexual assault. Gomez denied any nonconsensual conduct and said that he had made personal mistakes outside his marriage. Gonzales-Torres called for Gomez to disclose information about the allegations and criticized a "culture in Congress in which men abuse women". On August 19, Gonzales-Torres said Gomez should withdraw over the accusations.

Although Gomez is part of the Congressional Progressive Caucus, his acceptance of funding from the cryptocurrency industry and from American Israel Public Affairs Committee (AIPAC) led some progressive organizations to instead endorse Gonzales-Torres.

== Political positions ==
Gonzales-Torres supports progressive policies. She has made affordability, housing, health care, environmental policy, immigration and campaign finance central parts of her platform.

Gonzales-Torres identifies as a democratic socialist, is a Democratic Socialists of America member, and was endorsed by Los Angeles DSA. Gonzales-Torres has also been endorsed by Justice Democrats, Our Revolution, and the California Working Families Party.

=== Campaign finance ===
Gonzales-Torres has refused all corporate PAC contributions. Gonzales-Torres supports overturning Citizens United v. FEC and a ban on Congresspeople trading stocks. Gonzalez-Torres supports an AI data center moratorium and signed QuitGPT's pledge to refuse donations from AI firms.

=== Economic and social policy ===
Gonzales-Torres supports Medicare for All, a Green New Deal, and free public college for all. Her platform also includes a guaranteed-basic-income pilot program in the district, collective-bargaining rights for gig workers, and universal paid sick leave. She has advocated for protections for renters and policies intended to reduce displacement.

=== Immigration ===
Gonzales-Torres supports a pathway to citizenship for all undocumented residents, with a particular focus on Deferred Action for Childhood Arrivals (DACA), Temporary Protected Status (TPS), and essential workers. Gonzales-Torres supports protections against family separation and arbitrary deportation, and supports a ban on Immigration and Customs Enforcement raids at schools, hospitals, churches, and other sensitive locations. Gonzales-Torres links her policy proposals to her father's deportation, a family separation which crushed her family for years.

=== Foreign policy ===
Gonzales-Torres rejects campaign contributions from AIPAC and strongly opposes US military aid to Israel. Gonzales-Torres argues that Israel's actions in Gaza amount to genocide.

== Election results ==
=== 2026 congressional election ===
California's 34th congressional district, 2026
Primary election
Party	Candidate	Votes	%
Democratic	Jimmy Gomez (incumbent)	54,993	45.99
Democratic	Angela Gonzales-Torres	36,708	30.70
Republican	Calvin Lee	16,321	13.65
Democratic	Robert George Lucero Jr.	6,144	5.14
Democratic	Arthur Dixon	4,103	3.43
No party preference	Loren Colin	1,316	1.10
Total votes		119,585	100.0
General election
Democratic	Jimmy Gomez (incumbent)	65,061	37.97
Democratic	Angela Gonzales-Torres	106,298	62.03
Total votes		171,359	100.0

== Personal life ==
Gonzales-Torres is a skateboarder and a vegan.

== Notes ==
U.S. House of Representatives
Preceded by Jimmy Gomez	Member of the U.S. House of Representatives from California's 34th congressional district Taking office 2027	Elect
