= Martin Nesbitt =

American businessman and public figure (born 1962)

Marty Nesbitt
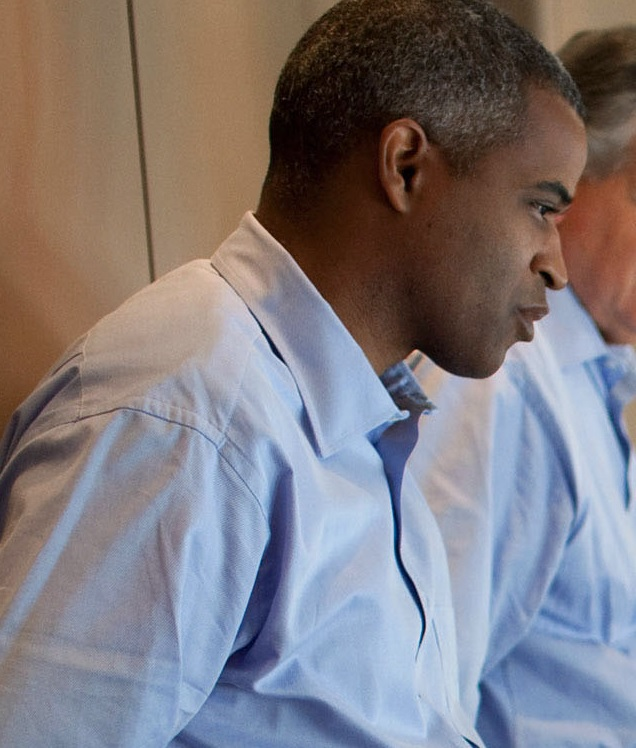
- Nesbitt is shown on Air Force One, October 2009
- Born: Martin Hughes Nesbitt; November 29, 1962 (age 63); Columbus, Ohio, U.S.
- Education: Albion College (BA); University of Chicago (MBA)
- Political party: Democratic

Martin Hughes Nesbitt (born November 29, 1962) is an American businessman and public figure. He is the co-CEO of the Vistria Group, a Chicago-based private equity firm. Nesbitt is on the boards of directors of publicly traded companies CenterPoint Energy, Norfolk Southern Corporation, and American Airlines Group. He was the founder and CEO of The Parking Spot, an airport parking company. He was on the board of the Chicago Housing Authority.

Nesbitt is a close personal friend of former President Barack Obama and was the campaign treasurer during Obama's 2008 presidential campaign. He is the board chair of the Obama Foundation.

== Early life and education ==
Nesbitt was born in Columbus, Ohio, grew up there and graduating from Columbus Academy in Gahanna, Ohio. He earned a bachelor's degree from Albion College in Albion, Michigan, in 1985. After working as a financial analyst at GMAC, he won a fellowship to study at the University of Chicago Graduate School of Business, where he earned an MBA in 1991.

== Business career ==
From 1996 to 1998, he worked as a vice president of Pritzker Realty group and in 1998, he founded The Parking Spot along with investor Penny Pritzker. The Parking Spot offers airport parking services primarily for business travelers.

In 2013, he co-founded The Vistria Group, a private equity firm, with Chicago businessman Kip Kirkpatrick. Both Nesbitt and Kirkpatrick are on the board of Rush University Medical Center. Along with a series of other funds, The Vistria Group acquired Apollo Education Group, one of the world's largest private education providers, in 2017, and the parent company of University of Phoenix. The firm has over $3.1 billion in assets under management from institutional investors like public retirement plans, corporations, endowments or foundations, high net-worth families, non-U.S. investors and financial institutions. Nesbitt is on the board of CenterPoint Energy, a natural gas and electric company.

== Relationship with Barack Obama ==
Nesbitt met Barack and Michelle Obama through Craig Robinson, Michelle Obama's brother, who was a high school basketball coach. He supported Obama's 2004 U.S. Senate bid and was the treasurer on his 2008 presidential campaign. As of 2014, Nesbitt was on the foundation planning board for the home of the Barack Obama Presidential Library and Museum which opened in June 2026.
