= Kip Kirkpatrick =

American businessman, entrepreneur, former basketball player

- Born: Harreld Newman Kirkpatrick III; September 20, 1971 (age 55); Nashville, Tennessee, U.S.
- Education: Northwestern University (BS) Northwestern University (MBA)
- Occupations: Businessman & Entrepreneur
- Title: Co-Founder & co-CEO, The Vistria Group

Harreld Newman "Kip" Kirkpatrick III (born September 20, 1971) is an American businessman, entrepreneur and former Northwestern Wildcats men's basketball player. Kirkpatrick is the co-founder, co-chairman and co-CEO of The Vistria Group, a Chicago-based private equity firm.

He is a member of the board of trustees at Northwestern University, Rush University Medical Center, and The Art Institute of Chicago. He also serves on the Global Advisory Board at the Kellogg School of Management and is Chairman of the Kellogg Private Equity Advisory Council.

== Early life and education ==
Kirkpatrick was born Nashville, Tennessee, and raised in Lexington, Kentucky. He graduated from Henry Clay High School in Lexington, Kentucky, in 1990. At Henry Clay, Kip was a multi-sport athlete and was captain of both the basketball and golf teams. A three-year varsity player at Henry Clay, he helped lead the Blue Devils to the Sweet Sixteen and several district championships under legendary coach Al Prewitt. His senior year, he played in the Kentucky/Indiana All-Star Game, was the Lexington Herald Leader Player of the Year, was voted All-State, and made a half-court shot beating the number one team in the state, Louisville Fairdale. Kirkpatrick also played in state golf tournaments his junior and senior years, qualifying in his senior year as an individual after finishing second in the region and winning a junior Kentucky PGA event.

He was recruited to play basketball for Northwestern University and was a three-year starter for the Wildcats – including their 1994 National Invitation Tournament team. Kirkpatrick was nominated for the GTE Academic All-American team by his coach, Ricky Byrdsong, and finished his career with 686 points, 263 assists, and 297 rebounds. Kirkpatrick won The Billy McKinney Award in 1994 and helped lead his senior class to the second round of the NIT in 1994, including wins over Michigan and DePaul. Early in the 1993–1994 season, Kirkpatrick led the nation in 3-point and free-throw shooting.

He graduated with a bachelor's degree in history from Northwestern University in 1994 and returned to earn his master's degree in business administration from Northwestern's Kellogg Graduate School of Business in 1997.

Kirkpatrick continues to support Northwestern University. In addition to his seat on the board of trustees, Kip serves as co-chair emeritus for the Chicago Council of the Northwestern University Leadership Circle and the Global Advisory Board at the Kellogg School of Management. Kirkpatrick is a frequent guest lecturer on campus, the Kellogg Private Equity Advisory Council (PEAC) co-founder, and an advisor to the Kellogg Advanced Private Equity Experience (APEX), helping graduate students garner meaningful job experience and industry connections before graduation.

In 2017, Kirkpatrick and his wife Sara Kirkpatrick were among a group of trustees and alumni who were key benefactors for the renovation of Northwestern's Welsh-Ryan Arena. In 2022, Kirkpatrick delivered the commencement address to the Northwestern University School of Professional Studies. In 2024, Kirkpatrick and his wife Sara announced a $5 million gift to Northwestern University athletics to build a new softball stadium and facilities. The stadium, to be named the Kip and Sara Kirkpatrick Stadium, is anticipated to be completed by spring 2026.

== Business career ==
In 1994, Kirkpatrick began his private equity career at First Chicago Bank as part of a management training program called The First Scholars Program. After First Chicago merged with NBD and Bank One, he helped form One Equity Partners. He worked on the healthcare investment team and eventually became one of 15 partners managing $5.5 billion.

In 2005, Kirkpatrick co-founded Water Street Healthcare Partners, a Chicago-based private equity firm with a $370-million fund and raising a second fund of $650 million in 2009. In 2007, he was named to Crain's Chicago Business 40 under 40 and an “up and comer” by Modern Healthcare for his role in the firm's growth.

From 2011 to 2013, Kirkpatrick served as CEO of United Shore Financial Services. Under Kirkpatrick's leadership, the firm grew rapidly, expanding its national presence, transforming the workplace culture, and growing the staff by more than 800 people. During Kirkpatrick's tenure, USFS was recognized as one of the fastest-growing companies in Michigan, a “Best and Brightest Companies to Work for in Metropolitan Detroit,” and “One of the Top Workplaces.”

=== The Vistria Group ===
In 2013, Kip Kirkpatrick and Martin Nesbitt published their manifesto “A New Vision for Investing in America,” where they outlined a plan for a different kind of private investment firm whose commitment to the welfare of communities, businesses, and workers would play to the financial benefit of investors, because "running a business the right way leads to higher returns." That year, they launched The Vistria Group.

They avoided calling The Vistria Group a private equity firm because "the label evokes images of Gordon Gekko-types from Wall Street. I believe the typical private equity firm still concentrates too much on financial engineering and cost reduction. Our firm is focused on growth. We want to partner with middle-market businesses and help management teams attract talent, land new customers, develop new products, and navigate the changing landscape,” Kirkpatrick told Kellogg Connections magazine.

The $400 million The Vistria Group Flagship Equity Fund 1 was launched in 2014, and The Vistria Group made its first impact investments in growing healthcare, financial services, and education companies – five years before the US Business Roundtable issued its statement calling for companies to serve all stakeholders rather than just shareholders. Today, the firm continues to invest in companies that help Americans become more “healthy, wealthy, and wise.”

The $800 million The Vistria Group Flagship Equity Fund 2 launched in 2017 with additional funds launching in 2020, 2021, and 2023.

In 2023, The Vistria Group surpassed more than $10 billion in assets under management. Kirkpatrick and Nesbitt continue to lead and grow the firm as co-CEOs. Vistria has offices in Chicago, Dallas, and New York City. The Vistria Group currently holds investments in 40 healthcare, financial services, and education companies and has launched a real estate fund.

In 2024, The Vistria Group continued its growth by reaching nearly $14 billion in assets under management.

Kirkpatrick has served on numerous boards, including as Chairman of the Board of Medulla LLC, PLUS Diagnostics, and Precision Dynamics Corporation, and as a board member and one of the chief architects of Supplemental Healthcare, Caremetx, AbilityOne Corporation, Medex Corporation, and CareCentrix.

== Politics ==
Kirkpatrick briefly entered the Democratic nomination for Illinois State Treasurer, challenging former state Rep. Robin Kelly and raising $512,722 for his campaign. On September 2, 2009, Kirkpatrick announced that he would withdraw from the race.

== Personal life ==
Kirkpatrick's father, Harreld Newman “Kirk” Kirkpatrick II, was executive director of Habitat for Humanity, and his grandfather, Harreld Newman Kirkpatrick I, was the commissioner of mines and minerals in Kentucky under Governor Louis Nunn.

Kirkpatrick married his high-school sweetheart Sara, who also attended Henry Clay High School, in 1996. The couple have four children.
