= California's 34th congressional district =

U.S. House district for California

Coordinates: 34°04′29″N 118°13′42″W

- Interactive map of district boundaries since January 3, 2023 (Note: The district includes the same census blocks as drawn by the Citizens Redistricting Commission in 2021 and during mid-decade redistricting as passed in Prop 50 (2025). As such, boundaries of the district will not change at the 2026 elections.)
- Representative: Jimmy Gomez; D–Los Angeles
- Population (2025): 742,164
- Median household income: $66,177
- Ethnicity: 63.8% Hispanic; 19.6% Asian; 10.5% White; 4.4% Black; 1.2% Two or more races; 0.5% other
- Cook PVI: D+28

California's 34th congressional district is a U.S. congressional district in California. Located in Los Angeles County, the district is represented by Democrat Jimmy Gomez. Its previous U.S. representative, Democrat Xavier Becerra of Los Angeles, resigned January 24, 2017, to become attorney general of California. Representative Gomez won a special election on June 6, 2017, beating fellow Democrat Robert Lee Ahn to replace Becerra. He was later sworn in as the district's U.S. representative on July 11, 2017.

The district is almost entirely within the City of Los Angeles and includes the following neighborhoods in Central, East, and Northeast Los Angeles: Boyle Heights, Chinatown, City Terrace, Cypress Park, Downtown Los Angeles, Eagle Rock, El Sereno, Garvanza, Glassell Park, Highland Park, Koreatown, Little Bangladesh, Little Tokyo, Lincoln Heights, Montecito Heights, Monterey Hills, Mount Washington, and Westlake.

== Recent election results from statewide races ==
=== 2023–2027 boundaries ===
| Year | Office | Results |
|---|---|---|
| 2008 | President | Obama 80–19% |
| 2010 | Governor | Brown 78–16% |
| 2010 | Lt. Governor | Newsom 69–20% |
| 2010 | Secretary of State | Bowen 75–14% |
| 2010 | Attorney General | Harris 68–23% |
| 2010 | Treasurer | Lockyer 77–15% |
| 2010 | Controller | Chiang 74–14% |
| 2012 | President | Obama 86–14% |
| 2014 | Governor | Brown 84–16% |
| 2016 | President | Clinton 84–10% |
| 2018 | Governor | Newsom 85–15% |
| 2018 | Attorney General | Becerra 88–12% |
| 2020 | President | Biden 81–17% |
| 2022 | Senate (Reg.) | Padilla 83–17% |
| 2022 | Governor | Newsom 82–18% |
| 2022 | Lt. Governor | Kounalakis 81–19% |
| 2022 | Secretary of State | Weber 82–18% |
| 2022 | Attorney General | Bonta 81–19% |
| 2022 | Treasurer | Ma 80–20% |
| 2022 | Controller | Cohen 77–23% |
| 2024 | President | Harris 73–22% |
| 2024 | Senate (Reg.) | Schiff 76–24% |

== Composition ==
| FIPS County Code | County | Seat | Population |
|---|---|---|---|
| 37 | Los Angeles | Los Angeles | 9,663,345 |

Under the 2020 redistricting, California's 34th congressional district is located in Southern California, taking up an area almost entirely within the City of Los Angeles. It includes the Los Angeles neighborhoods of Boyle Heights, Lincoln Heights, Naud Junction, El Sereno, Highland Park, Glassell Park, Mount Washington, Eagle Rock, Garvanza, Pico-Union, Harvard Heights, Koreatown, Westlake, Chinatown, Elysian Park, Montecito Heights, and Cypress Park; as well as the census-designated place East Los Angeles.

Los Angeles County is split between this district, the 28th district, the 30th district, the 37th district, the 38th district, and the 42nd district. The 34th and 28th are partitioned by Colorado Blvd, Lantana Dr, Church St, Adelaide Pl, Highway 110, N Huntingdon Dr, S Winchester Ave, Valley Blvd, Laguna Channel, Highway 710, l-10 Express Ln, Rollins Dr, Floral Dr, E Colonia, Belvedere Park, Highway 60, S Atlantic Blvd, and Pomona Blvd.

The 34th, 37th and 30th are partitioned by S Alameda St, E 7th St, Harbor Freeway, Highway 10, S Normandie Ave, W Pico Blvd, Crenshaw Blvd, Wilshire Blvd, S Van Ness Ave, S Wilton Pl, N Wilton Pl, Beverly Blvd, N Western Ave, Melrose Ave, Hollywood Freeway, Douglas St, Lilac Ter, N Boylston St, Academy Rd, Pasadena Freeway, Highway 5, Duvall St, Blake Ave, Fernleaf St, Crystal St, Blake Ave, Meadowvale Ave, Los Angeles, Benedict St, N Coolidge Ave, Glendale Freeway, Roswell St, Delay Dr, Fletcher Dr, Southern Pacific Railroad, S Glendale Ave, Vista Superba Dr, Verdugo Rd, Plumas St, Carr Park, Harvey Dr, and Eagle Rock Hilside Park.

The 34th, 38th and 42nd are partitioned by S Gerhart Ave, Simmons Ave, Dewar Ave, W Beverly Blvd, Repetto Ave, Allston St, S Concourse Ave, Ferguson Dr, Simmons Ave/S Gerhart Ave, Highway 72, Goodrich Blvd, Telegraph Rd, S Marianna Ave, Noakes St, S Bonnie Beach Pl, Union Pacific Ave, S Indiana St, Union Pacific Railroad, Holabird Ave, S Grande Vista Ave, AT & SF Railway, Harriet St, and E 25th St.

=== Cities and CDPs with 10,000 or more people ===
- Los Angeles – 3,820,914
- East Los Angeles – 118,786

== List of members representing the district ==
| Member | Party | Years | Cong ress(es) | Electoral history | Counties |
|---|---|---|---|---|---|
District created January 3, 1963
| Richard T. Hanna (Anaheim) | Democratic | January 3, 1963 – December 31, 1974 | 88th 89th 90th 91st 92nd 93rd | Elected in 1962. Re-elected in 1964. Re-elected in 1966. Re-elected in 1968. Re-elected in 1970. Re-elected in 1972. Resigned. | 1963–1969; Orange |
| Richard T. Hanna (Anaheim) | Democratic | January 3, 1963 – December 31, 1974 | 88th 89th 90th 91st 92nd 93rd | Elected in 1962. Re-elected in 1964. Re-elected in 1966. Re-elected in 1968. Re-elected in 1970. Re-elected in 1972. Resigned. | 1969–1973; Los Angeles, Orange |
| Richard T. Hanna (Anaheim) | Democratic | January 3, 1963 – December 31, 1974 | 88th 89th 90th 91st 92nd 93rd | Elected in 1962. Re-elected in 1964. Re-elected in 1966. Re-elected in 1968. Re-elected in 1970. Re-elected in 1972. Resigned. | 1973–1975; Los Angeles, Orange |
| Vacant | | December 31, 1974 – January 3, 1975 | 93rd | | 1973–1975; Los Angeles, Orange |
| Mark W. Hannaford (Lakewood) | Democratic | January 3, 1975 – January 3, 1979 | 94th 95th | Elected in 1974. Re-elected in 1976. Lost re-election. | 1975–1983; Los Angeles, Northwestern Orange |
| Dan Lungren (Long Beach) | Republican | January 3, 1979 – January 3, 1983 | 96th 97th | Elected in 1978. Re-elected in 1980. Redistricted to the 42nd district. | 1975–1983; Los Angeles, Northwestern Orange |
| Esteban Torres (La Puente) | Democratic | January 3, 1983 – January 3, 1999 | 98th 99th 100th 101st 102nd 103rd 104th 105th | Elected in 1982. Re-elected in 1984. Re-elected in 1986. Re-elected in 1988. Re-elected in 1990. Re-elected in 1992. Re-elected in 1994. Re-elected in 1996. Retired. | 1983–1993; Los Angeles (Norwalk) |
| Esteban Torres (La Puente) | Democratic | January 3, 1983 – January 3, 1999 | 98th 99th 100th 101st 102nd 103rd 104th 105th | Elected in 1982. Re-elected in 1984. Re-elected in 1986. Re-elected in 1988. Re-elected in 1990. Re-elected in 1992. Re-elected in 1994. Re-elected in 1996. Retired. | 1993–2003; Los Angeles (Norwalk) |
| Grace Napolitano (Los Angeles) | Democratic | January 3, 1999 – January 3, 2003 | 106th 107th | Elected in 1998. Re-elected in 2000. Redistricted to the 38th district. | 1993–2003; Los Angeles (Norwalk) |
| Lucille Roybal-Allard (Los Angeles) | Democratic | January 3, 2003 – January 3, 2013 | 108th 109th 110th 111th 112th | Redistricted from the 33rd district and re-elected in 2002. Re-elected in 2004. Re-elected in 2006. Re-elected in 2008. Re-elected in 2010. Redistricted to the 40th district. | 2003–2013 Los Angeles (Downtown L.A., Downey) |
| Xavier Becerra (Los Angeles) | Democratic | January 3, 2013 – January 24, 2017 | 113th 114th 115th | Redistricted from the 31st district and re-elected in 2012. Re-elected in 2014. Re-elected in 2016. Resigned to become California Attorney General. | 2013–2023 Los Angeles (Downtown L.A., Northeast) |
| Vacant | | January 24, 2017 – July 11, 2017 | 115th | | 2013–2023 Los Angeles (Downtown L.A., Northeast) |
| Jimmy Gomez (Los Angeles) | Democratic | July 11, 2017 – present | 115th 116th 117th 118th 119th | Elected to finish Becerra's term. Re-elected in 2018. Re-elected in 2020. Re-elected in 2022. Re-elected in 2024. Lost re-election. | 2013–2023 Los Angeles (Downtown L.A., Northeast) |
| Jimmy Gomez (Los Angeles) | Democratic | July 11, 2017 – present | 115th 116th 117th 118th 119th | Elected to finish Becerra's term. Re-elected in 2018. Re-elected in 2020. Re-elected in 2022. Re-elected in 2024. Lost re-election. | 2023–present Los Angeles (Downtown L.A., Northeast, East Los Angeles) |
| Angela Gonzales-Torres (Los Angeles) | Democratic | Assuming office on January 3, 2027 | | Elected in 2026. | 2023–present Los Angeles (Downtown L.A., Northeast, East Los Angeles) |

== Election results ==
=== 1962 ===
1962 United States House of Representatives elections in California
| Party | Candidate | Votes | % |
|---|---|---|---|
| Democratic | Richard T. Hanna | 90,758 | 55.9 |
| Republican | Robert A. Geier | 71,478 | 44.1 |
| Total votes | | 162,236 | 100.0 |
| Democratic win (new seat) | | | |

=== 1964 ===
1964 United States House of Representatives elections in California
| Party | Candidate | Votes | % |
|---|---|---|---|
| Democratic | Richard T. Hanna (Incumbent) | 137,588 | 58.3 |
| Republican | Robert A. Geier | 98,606 | 41.7 |
| Total votes | | 236,194 | 100.0 |
| Democratic hold | | | |

=== 1966 ===
1966 United States House of Representatives elections in California
| Party | Candidate | Votes | % |
|---|---|---|---|
| Democratic | Richard T. Hanna (Incumbent) | 127,976 | 55.8 |
| Republican | Frank LaMagna | 101,410 | 44.2 |
| Total votes | | 129,386 | 100.0 |
| Democratic hold | | | |

=== 1968 ===
1968 United States House of Representatives elections in California
| Party | Candidate | Votes | % |
|---|---|---|---|
| Democratic | Richard T. Hanna (Incumbent) | 105,880 | 50.9 |
| Republican | Bill J. Teague | 102,333 | 49.1 |
| Total votes | | 208,213 | 100.0 |
| Democratic hold | | | |

=== 1970 ===
1970 United States House of Representatives elections in California
| Party | Candidate | Votes | % |
|---|---|---|---|
| Democratic | Richard T. Hanna (Incumbent) | 101,664 | 54.5 |
| Republican | Bill J. Teague | 82,167 | 44.0 |
| American Independent | Lee R. Rayburn | 2,843 | 1.5 |
| Total votes | | 186,674 | 100.0 |
| Democratic hold | | | |

=== 1972 ===
1972 United States House of Representatives elections in California
| Party | Candidate | Votes | % |
|---|---|---|---|
| Democratic | Richard T. Hanna (Incumbent) | 113,841 | 67.2 |
| Republican | John D. Ratterree | 48,916 | 28.9 |
| American Independent | Lee R. Rayburn | 6,604 | 3.9 |
| Total votes | | 169,361 | 100.0 |
| Democratic hold | | | |

=== 1974 ===
1974 United States House of Representatives elections in California
| Party | Candidate | Votes | % |
|---|---|---|---|
| Democratic | Mark W. Hannaford (Incumbent) | 78,345 | 49.8 |
| Republican | Bill Bond | 72,967 | 46.3 |
| American Independent | James Manis | 3,169 | 2.0 |
| Peace and Freedom | John S. Donohue | 3,043 | 1.9 |
| Total votes | | 157,524 | 100.0 |
| Democratic hold | | | |

=== 1976 ===
1976 United States House of Representatives elections in California
| Party | Candidate | Votes | % |
|---|---|---|---|
| Democratic | Mark W. Hannaford (Incumbent) | 100,988 | 50.7 |
| Republican | Dan Lungren | 98,147 | 49.3 |
| Total votes | | 199,135 | 100.0 |
| Democratic hold | | | |

=== 1978 ===
1978 United States House of Representatives elections in California
| Party | Candidate | Votes | % |
|---|---|---|---|
| Republican | Dan Lungren | 90,554 | 53.7 |
| Democratic | Mark W. Hannaford (Incumbent) | 73,608 | 43.7 |
| American Independent | Lawrence John Stafford | 4,410 | 2.6 |
| Total votes | | 168,572 | 100.0 |
| Republican gain from Democratic | | | |

=== 1980 ===
1980 United States House of Representatives elections in California
| Party | Candidate | Votes | % |
|---|---|---|---|
| Republican | Dan Lungren (Incumbent) | 138,024 | 71.8 |
| Democratic | Simone | 46,351 | 24.1 |
| Peace and Freedom | John S. Donohue | 7,794 | 4.1 |
| Total votes | | 192,169 | 100.0 |
| Republican hold | | | |

=== 1982 ===
1982 United States House of Representatives elections in California
| Party | Candidate | Votes | % |
|---|---|---|---|
| Democratic | Esteban Torres | 68,316 | 57.2 |
| Republican | Paul R. Jackson | 51,026 | 42.8 |
| Total votes | | 119,342 | 100.0 |
| Democratic hold | | | |

=== 1984 ===
1984 United States House of Representatives elections in California
| Party | Candidate | Votes | % |
|---|---|---|---|
| Democratic | Esteban Torres (Incumbent) | 87,060 | 59.8 |
| Republican | Paul R. Jackson | 58,467 | 40.2 |
| Total votes | | 145,527 | 100.0 |
| Democratic hold | | | |

=== 1986 ===
1986 United States House of Representatives elections in California
| Party | Candidate | Votes | % |
|---|---|---|---|
| Democratic | Esteban Torres (Incumbent) | 66,404 | 60.3 |
| Republican | Charles M. House | 43,659 | 39.7 |
| Total votes | | 110,063 | 100.0 |
| Democratic hold | | | |

=== 1988 ===
1988 United States House of Representatives elections in California
| Party | Candidate | Votes | % |
|---|---|---|---|
| Democratic | Esteban Torres (Incumbent) | 92,087 | 63.2 |
| Republican | Charles M. House | 50,954 | 35.0 |
| Libertarian | Carl M. "Marty" Swinney | 2,686 | 1.8 |
| Total votes | | 145,727 | 100.0 |
| Democratic hold | | | |

=== 1990 ===
1990 United States House of Representatives elections in California
| Party | Candidate | Votes | % |
|---|---|---|---|
| Democratic | Esteban Torres (Incumbent) | 55,646 | 60.7 |
| Republican | John C. Eastman | 36,024 | 39.3 |
| Total votes | | 91,670 | 100.0 |
| Democratic hold | | | |

=== 1992 ===
1992 United States House of Representatives elections in California
| Party | Candidate | Votes | % |
|---|---|---|---|
| Democratic | Esteban Torres (Incumbent) | 91,738 | 61.3 |
| Republican | J. Jay Hernandez | 50,907 | 34.0 |
| Libertarian | Carl M. "Marty" Swinney | 7,072 | 4.7 |
| Independent | M V Paul Worland (write-in) | 1 | 0.0 |
| Total votes | | 149,718 | 100.0 |
| Democratic hold | | | |

=== 1994 ===
1994 United States House of Representatives elections in California
| Party | Candidate | Votes | % |
|---|---|---|---|
| Democratic | Esteban Torres (Incumbent) | 72,439 | 61.7 |
| Republican | Albert J. Nunez | 40,068 | 34.1 |
| Libertarian | Carl M. "Marty" Swinney | 4,921 | 4.2 |
| American Independent | J. Scott (write-in) | 27 | 0.0 |
| Total votes | | 117,455 | 100.0 |
| Democratic hold | | | |

=== 1996 ===
1996 United States House of Representatives elections in California
| Party | Candidate | Votes | % |
|---|---|---|---|
| Democratic | Esteban Torres (Incumbent) | 94,730 | 68.5 |
| Republican | David Nunez | 36,852 | 26.7 |
| American Independent | J. Scott | 4,122 | 2.9 |
| Libertarian | David Argall | 2,736 | 1.9 |
| Total votes | | 138,440 | 100.0 |
| Democratic hold | | | |

=== 1998 ===
1998 United States House of Representatives elections in California
| Party | Candidate | Votes | % |
|---|---|---|---|
| Democratic | Grace Napolitano | 76,471 | 67.6 |
| Republican | Ed Perez | 32,321 | 28.6 |
| Libertarian | Jason Heath | 2,195 | 2.0 |
| American Independent | Walter Scott | 2,088 | 1.8 |
| Total votes | | 113,075 | 100.0 |
| Democratic hold | | | |

=== 2000 ===
2000 United States House of Representatives elections in California
| Party | Candidate | Votes | % |
|---|---|---|---|
| Democratic | Grace Napolitano (Incumbent) | 105,980 | 71.3 |
| Republican | Robert Arthur Canales | 33,445 | 22.5 |
| Natural Law | Julia F. Simon | 9,262 | 6.2 |
| Republican | John W. Brantuk (write-in) | 36 | 0.0 |
| Total votes | | 148,723 | 100.0 |
| Democratic hold | | | |

=== 2002 ===
2002 United States House of Representatives elections in California
| Party | Candidate | Votes | % |
|---|---|---|---|
| Democratic | Lucille Roybal-Allard (Incumbent) | 46,734 | 74.1 |
| Republican | Wayne Miller | 17,090 | 25.9 |
| Total votes | | 63,824 | 100.0 |
| Democratic hold | | | |

=== 2004 ===
2004 United States House of Representatives elections in California
| Party | Candidate | Votes | % |
|---|---|---|---|
| Democratic | Lucille Roybal-Allard (Incumbent) | 82,282 | 74.5 |
| Republican | Wayne Miller | 28,175 | 25.5 |
| Total votes | | 110,457 | 100.0 |
| Democratic hold | | | |

=== 2006 ===
2006 United States House of Representatives elections in California
| Party | Candidate | Votes | % |
|---|---|---|---|
| Democratic | Lucille Roybal-Allard (Incumbent) | 57,459 | 76.8 |
| Republican | Wayne Miller | 17,359 | 23.2 |
| Independent | Naomi Crane (write-in) | 1 | 0.0 |
| Total votes | | 74,819 | 100.0 |
| Democratic hold | | | |

=== 2008 ===
2008 United States House of Representatives elections in California
| Party | Candidate | Votes | % |
|---|---|---|---|
| Democratic | Lucille Roybal-Allard (Incumbent) | 98,503 | 77.1 |
| Republican | Christopher Balding | 29,266 | 22.9 |
| Total votes | | 127,769 | 100.0 |
| Turnout | | | 63.68 |
| Democratic hold | | | |

=== 2010 ===
2010 United States House of Representatives elections in California
| Party | Candidate | Votes | % |
|---|---|---|---|
| Democratic | Lucille Roybal-Allard (Incumbent) | 69,382 | 77.2 |
| Republican | Wayne Miller | 20,457 | 22.8 |
| Total votes | | 89,839 | 100.0 |
| Democratic hold | | | |

=== 2012 ===
2012 United States House of Representatives elections in California
| Party | Candidate | Votes | % |
|---|---|---|---|
| Democratic | Xavier Becerra (Incumbent) | 120,367 | 85.6 |
| Republican | Stephen C. Smith | 20,223 | 14.4 |
| Total votes | | 140,590 | 100.0 |
| Democratic hold | | | |

=== 2014 ===
2014 United States House of Representatives elections in California
| Party | Candidate | Votes | % |
|---|---|---|---|
| Democratic | Xavier Becerra (Incumbent) | 44,697 | 72.5 |
| Democratic | Adrienne Nicole Edwards | 16,924 | 27.5 |
| Total votes | | 61,621 | 100.0 |
| Democratic hold | | | |

=== 2016 ===
2016 United States House of Representatives elections in California
| Party | Candidate | Votes | % |
|---|---|---|---|
| Democratic | Xavier Becerra (Incumbent) | 122,842 | 77.2 |
| Democratic | Adrienne Nicole Edwards | 36,314 | 22.8 |
| Total votes | | 159,156 | 100.0 |
| Democratic hold | | | |

=== 2017 (Special) ===
2017 California's 34th congressional district special election
| Party | Candidate | Votes | % |
|---|---|---|---|
| Democratic | Jimmy Gomez | 25,569 | 59.2 |
| Democratic | Robert Lee Ahn | 17,610 | 40.8 |
| Total votes | | 43,179 | 100.0 |
| Turnout | | | 14.3 |
| Democratic hold | | | |

=== 2018 ===
2018 United States House of Representatives elections in California
| Party | Candidate | Votes | % |
|---|---|---|---|
| Democratic | Jimmy Gomez (Incumbent) | 110,195 | 72.5 |
| Green | Kenneth Mejia | 41,711 | 27.5 |
| Total votes | | 151,906 | 100.0 |
| Turnout | | | |
| Democratic hold | | | |

=== 2020 ===
2020 United States House of Representatives elections in California
| Party | Candidate | Votes | % |
|---|---|---|---|
| Democratic | Jimmy Gomez (incumbent) | 108,792 | 53.0 |
| Democratic | David Kim | 96,554 | 47.0 |
| Total votes | | 205,346 | 100.0 |
| Democratic hold | | | |

=== 2022 ===
2022 United States House of Representatives elections in California
| Party | Candidate | Votes | % |
|---|---|---|---|
| Democratic | Jimmy Gomez (incumbent) | 62,244 | 51.2 |
| Democratic | David Kim | 59,223 | 48.8 |
| Total votes | | 121,467 | 100.0 |
| Democratic hold | | | |

=== 2024 ===
California's 34th congressional district, 2024
Primary election
| Party | Candidate | Votes | % |
|---|---|---|---|
| Democratic | Jimmy Gomez (incumbent) | 41,611 | 51.2 |
| Democratic | David Kim | 22,703 | 27.9 |
| Republican | Calvin Lee | 11,495 | 14.1 |
| Peace and Freedom | Aaron Reveles | 3,223 | 4.0 |
| Democratic | David Ferrell | 2,312 | 2.8 |
| Total votes | | 81,344 | 100.0 |
General election
| Democratic | Jimmy Gomez (incumbent) | 105,394 | 55.6 |
| Democratic | David Kim | 84,020 | 44.4 |
| Total votes | | 189,414 | 100.0 |
| Democratic hold | | | |

=== 2026 ===
California's 34th congressional district, 2026
Primary election
| Party | Candidate | Votes | % |
|---|---|---|---|
| Democratic | Jimmy Gomez (incumbent) | 54,993 | 46.0 |
| Democratic | Angela Gonzales-Torres | 36,708 | 30.7 |
| Republican | Calvin Lee | 16,321 | 13.6 |
| Democratic | Robert Lucero Jr. | 6,144 | 5.1 |
| Democratic | Arthur Dixon | 4,103 | 3.4 |
| Independent | Loren Colin | 1,316 | 1.1 |
| Total votes | | 119,585 | 100.0 |
General election
| Democratic | Jimmy Gomez (incumbent) | | |
| Democratic | Angela Gonzales-Torres | | |
| Total votes | | | |
| Democratic hold | | | |

== Historical district boundaries ==
From 2003 through 2013, the district consisted of parts of downtown Los Angeles, including Downey, Bellflower and Maywood. Due to redistricting after the 2010 United States census, the district pivoted north east within Los Angeles County and still includes downtown Los Angeles and areas north east.

== See also ==
- List of United States congressional districts
- California's congressional districts
