= The Parking Spot =

Chicago-based parking company

- Type: Subsidiary
- Industry: Airport Parking
- Founded: 1998
- Headquarters: Chicago, Illinois
- Area served: United States
- Key people: Tim O'Malley, CEO
- Owner: KKR
- Website: theparkingspot.com

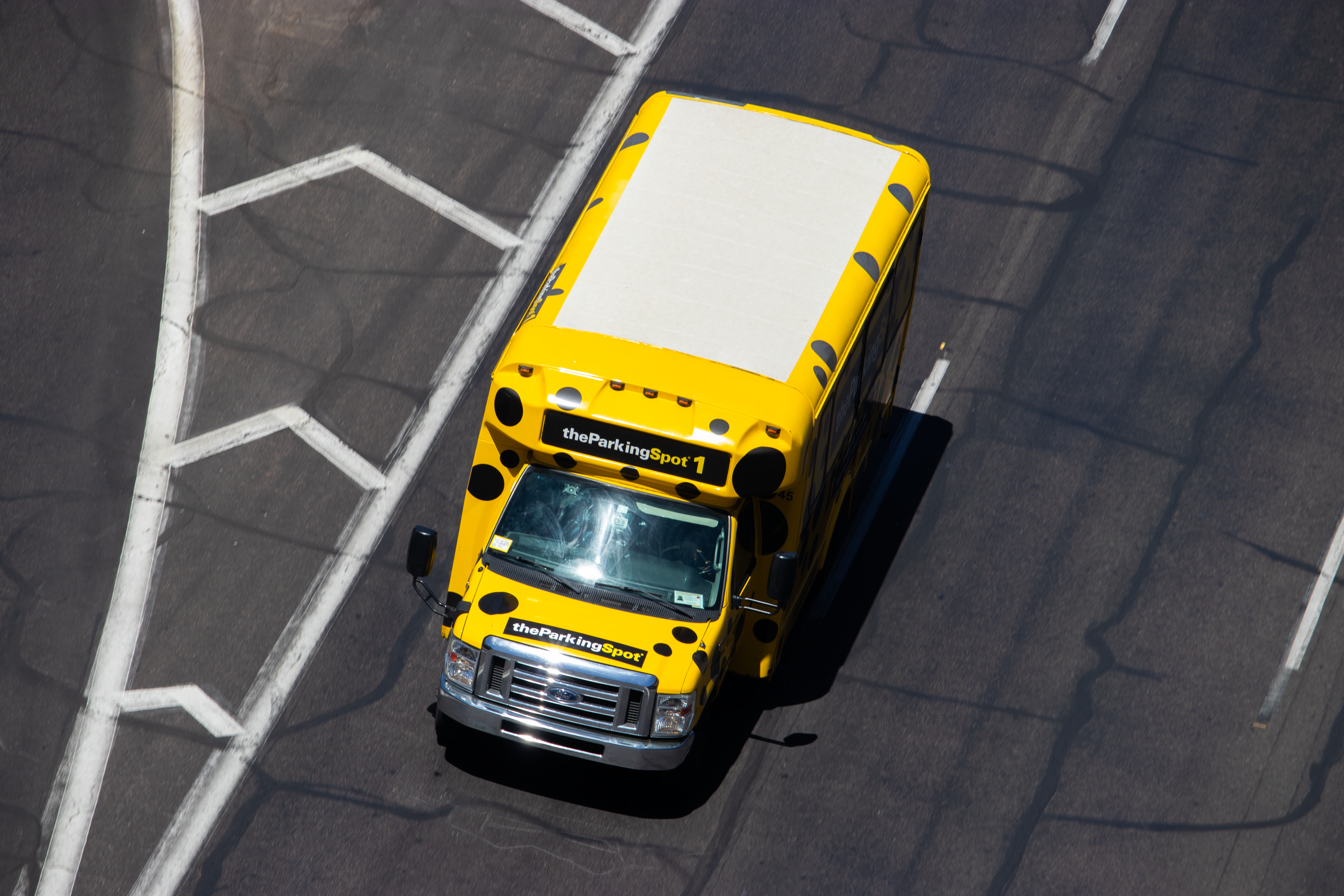
A shuttle bus operated by The Parking Spot at Phoenix Sky Harbor International Airport

The Parking Spot is an off-airport parking company based in Chicago, Illinois. Founded in 1998 by Martin Nesbitt, the company grew quickly to become a distinctive brand with hundreds of millions of passengers annually. The company's first backer was Penny Pritzker, a member of the prominent Pritzker family that founded and largely owns Hyatt.

The Parking Spot has 70+ near airport locations across 45 U.S. airports, as of 2025.

In 2011, The Parking Spot was sold to real estate investment group Green Courte Partners LLC for $360 million. Its loyalty rewards program, The Spot Club, crossed the million-member mark in 2016. In August 2019, the company announced a partnership with SpotHero, a digital parking marketplace, to allow for booking through their interface.

== Airport locations ==
- Atlanta - 4 locations
- Austin - 2 locations
- Baltimore - 2 locations
- Buffalo
- Charlotte
- Chicago
- Cleveland
- Columbus
- Dallas (DFW) - 3 locations
- Dallas (Love Field) - 2 locations
- Denver - 2 locations
- Hartford
- Houston (Hobby) - 2 locations
- Houston (IAH) - 3 locations
- Kansas City
- Los Angeles - 2 locations
- Miami
- Minneapolis
- Nashville
- Newark
- Orlando
- Philadelphia - 2 locations
- Phoenix - 3 locations
- Pittsburgh
- Salt Lake City
- St. Louis - 4 locations
