= Jimmy Gomez =

American politician (born 1974)

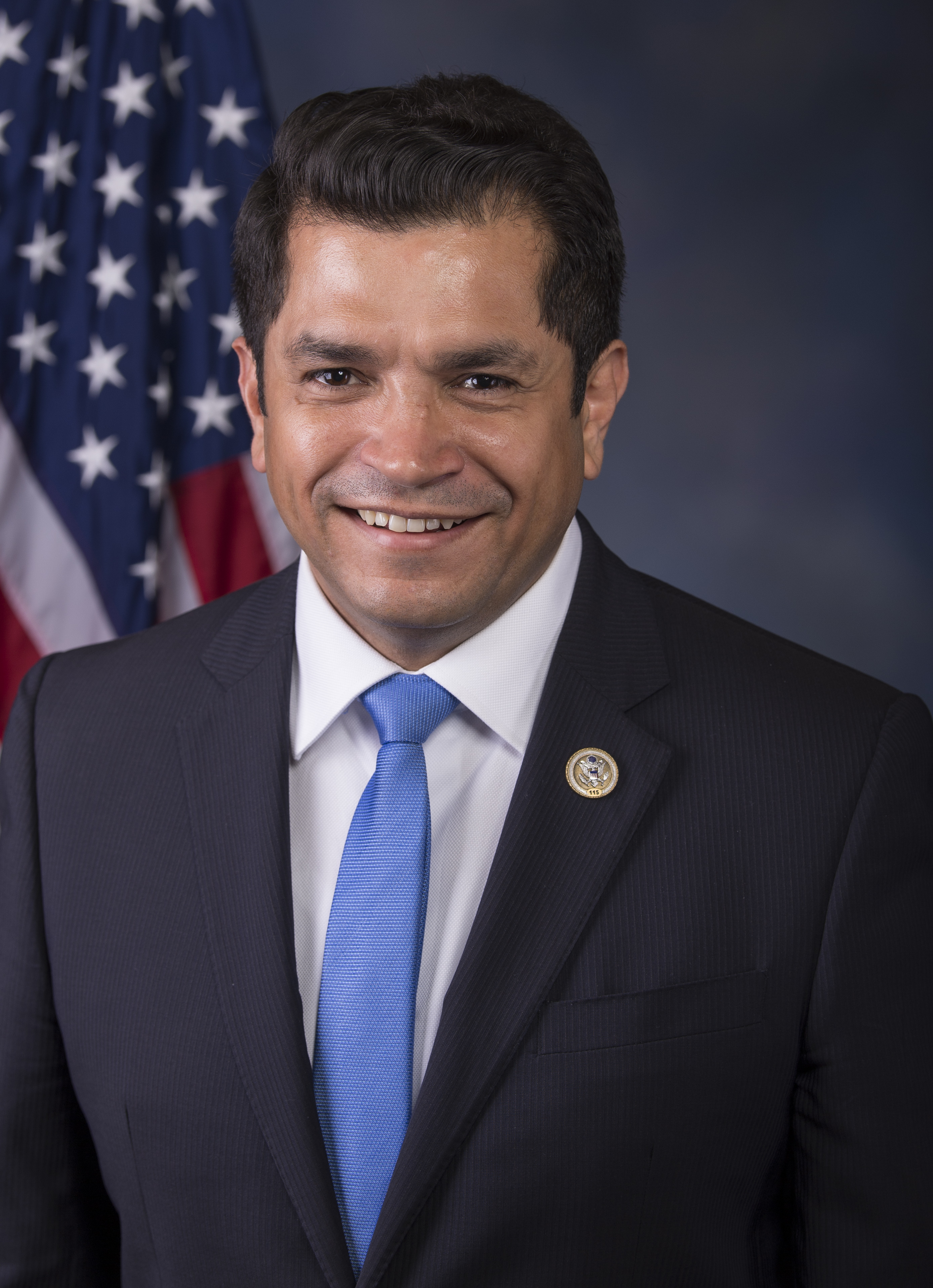
- Official portrait, 2017

Member of the U.S. House of Representatives from California's 34th district
- Incumbent
- Assumed office June 6, 2017 (Note: Gomez's official service begins on the date of the special election, while he was not sworn in until July 11, 2017.)
- Preceded by: Xavier Becerra
- Succeeded by: Angela Gonzales-Torres (elect)

Member of the California State Assembly from the 51st district
- In office December 3, 2012 – July 11, 2017
- Preceded by: Steven Bradford
- Succeeded by: Wendy Carrillo

Personal details
- Born: November 25, 1974 (age 51) Orange County, California, U.S.
- Party: Democratic
- Spouse: Mary Hodge (m. 2011)
- Children: 1
- Education: University of California, Los Angeles (BA); Harvard University (MPP)
- Website: House website Campaign website

Jimmy Gomez (born November 25, 1974) is an American politician serving as the U.S. representative for California's 34th congressional district since 2017. His district includes the Los Angeles neighborhoods of Eagle Rock, Boyle Heights, Downtown Los Angeles, Koreatown, and other communities. A member of the Democratic Party, Gomez served in the California State Assembly from 2012 to 2017.

In 2026, Gomez's re-election campaign became embroiled in controversy after the House Ethics Committee opened a sexual misconduct investigation into him due to a staffer alleging Gomez sexually assaulted her. Gomez was personal friends with former Congressman Eric Swalwell, who resigned from Congress amid criminal investigations into alleged rape and sexual misconduct, and had chaired Swalwell's gubernatorial campaign before it was suspended. Gomez has denied violating any ethics rules and maintained that his conduct was “consensual”. Gomez ultimately lost re-election to democratic socialist Angela Gonzales-Torres.

== Early life and education ==
Born and raised in Southern California, Gomez is the son of working-class immigrant parents. His mother was a domestic worker and a nursing home laundry attendant. His father was a bracero (farm worker). After graduating from high school, without any plans to attend college, Gomez worked at Subway and Target. He eventually attended Riverside Community College and earned his Bachelor of Arts in political science with a minor in urban planning from the University of California, Los Angeles. He received his Master of Public Policy from the Harvard Kennedy School. Gomez was a staffer for former U.S. Representative Hilda Solis. He was also a labor organizer.

== California State Assembly ==
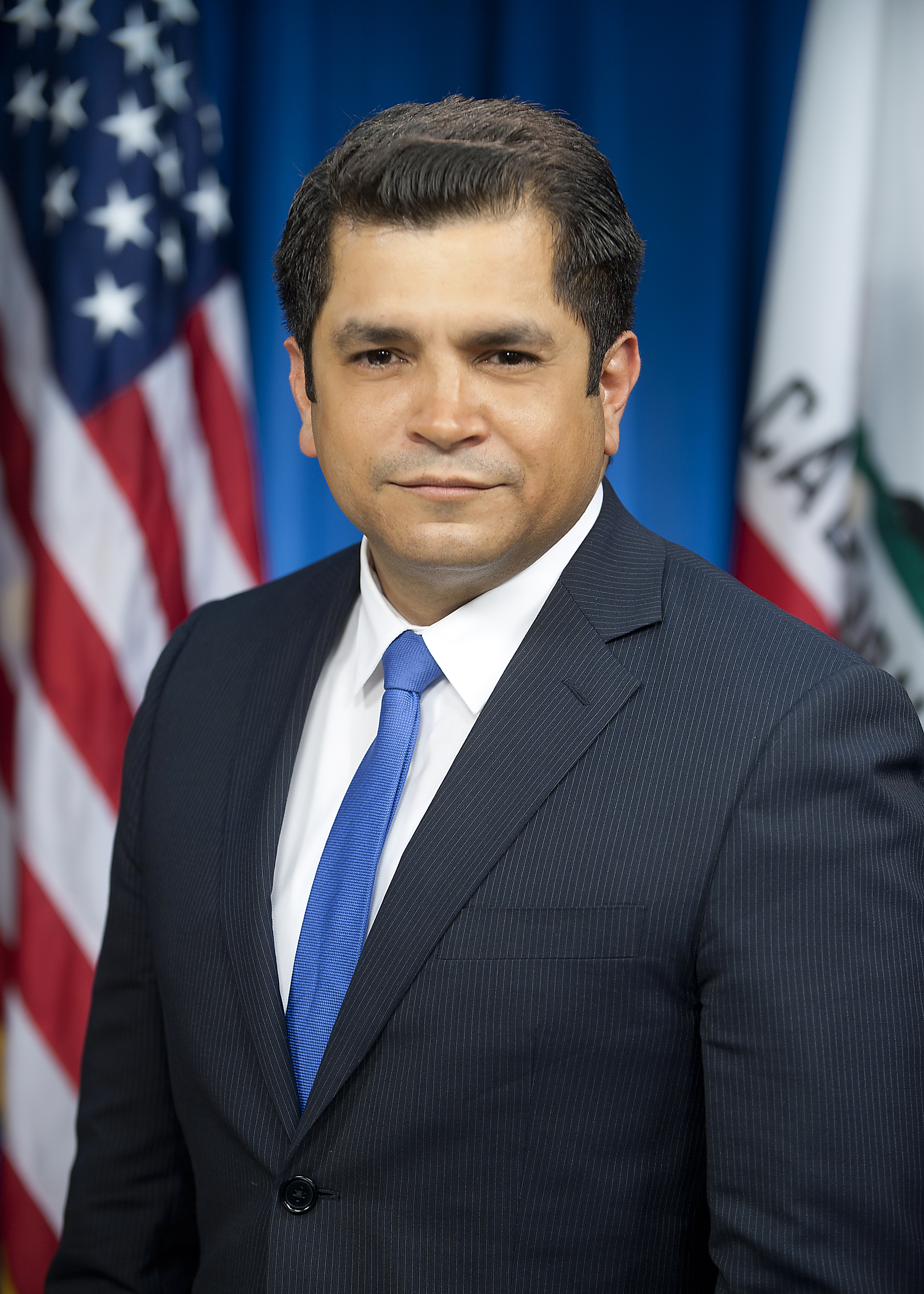
Gomez's official California Assembly portrait

Gomez was a member of the California State Assembly, representing the 51st district. He was first elected in 2012, and reelected in 2014 with over 83% of the vote. California's 51st Assembly district includes Northeast Los Angeles and unincorporated East Los Angeles. He served as State Assembly Majority Whip from 2013 to 2014. Gomez was a member of the California Latino Legislative Caucus.

== U.S. House of Representatives ==
=== Elections ===
==== 2017 ====
On December 5, 2016, Gomez announced his candidacy for the special election to succeed Xavier Becerra in the United States House of Representatives for California's 34th congressional district. Gomez received endorsements from Los Angeles Mayor Eric Garcetti, Assembly Speaker Anthony Rendon, and Senate leader Kevin de León, among others.

On April 4, 2017, Gomez came in first during the special election. Since he did not receive a majority of the vote, he faced a fellow Democrat, Los Angeles City Planning Commissioner Robert Lee Ahn, the runner-up, in a special runoff election on June 6. Gomez won with 60% of the vote. He is only the third person to represent this district since its creation in 1963 (it was numbered as the 30th from 1963 to 1975, the 25th from 1975 to 1993, the 30th from 1993 to 2003, the 31st from 2003 to 2013, and has been the 34th since 2017). Ed Roybal won this district in 1963 and handed it to Becerra in 1993.

==== 2018 ====
Gomez faced Green Party candidate Kenneth Mejia in the general election and won with 72.5% of the vote.

==== 2020 ====
Gomez was challenged in the 2020 election by MacArthur Park Neighborhood Council board member and fellow Democrat David Kim. On November 3, Gomez defeated Kim in a closer than expected race, with 53% of the vote to Kim's 47%.

==== 2022 ====
David Kim challenged Gomez again in 2022. Gomez won, but by a smaller margin than in 2020 with 51% of the vote to Kim's 48%. On October 22, 2022, Los Angeles City Councilmember-elect Eunisses Hernandez alleged that a female canvasser for Gomez and Assemblymember Wendy Carrillo made anti-Asian comments about their challengers, David Kim, who is Korean-American, and Mia Livas Porter, who is Filipina-American, respectively, while visiting Hernandez's home. In late October 2022, a Highland Park voter made similar allegations except this time it involved two female canvassers. In response, both Gomez's and Carrillo's campaigns offered an apology to their challengers and reached out to Hernandez via Twitter and separate phone conversations assuring that they had taken action to ensure the canvasser(s)-in-question were no longer part of the campaign.

==== 2024 ====
David Kim challenged Gomez again in 2024. Gomez won with 55% of the vote to Kim's 44%.

==== 2026 ====
Gomez ran for reelection and faced several challengers in the primary on June 2, 2026. He advanced to the general election, winning nearly 46% of the vote, and faced fellow Democrat Angela Gonzales-Torres in the general election. In August, Gomez would become mired in a scandal after the House Ethics Committee began an investigation into sexual misconduct allegations made against him. Gonzales-Torres, a member of the Democratic Socialists of America, would defeat Gomez by a 62%–38% margin.

=== Tenure ===
Gomez's term began on June 6, 2017. He was sworn into office on July 11, 2017. On October 1, 2020, Gomez co-signed a letter to Secretary of State Mike Pompeo that condemned Azerbaijan’s offensive operations against the Armenian-populated enclave of Nagorno-Karabakh, denounced Turkey’s role in the Nagorno-Karabakh conflict, and called for an immediate ceasefire. In November 2020, Gomez was named a candidate for United States Trade Representative in the Biden administration.

In January 2021, Gomez introduced legislation to expel Representative Marjorie Taylor Greene from the House for some of her social media postings from before her 2020 election to Congress. After Greene heckled President Biden at his State of the Union address on March 2, 2022, Gomez once again introduced a resolution of expulsion, but added Representative Lauren Boebert, who had joined her in the heckling. Gomez also spoke about the "triggering" feeling he experienced after he returned to the Congressional Gallery for the first time since right-wing rioters had attacked those chambers in an attempt to halt the counting of electoral votes on January 6, 2021.

=== Sexual assault investigation ===
In April 2026, the New York Post ran a story alleging that Gomez kissed an aide of another Congressmember at a party hosted by former Congressman Eric Swalwell in 2023. Gomez said this "didn't happen". Gomez was personal friends with Swalwell, who resigned from Congress amid criminal investigations into alleged rape and sexual misconduct, and had chaired Swalwell's gubernatorial campaign before it was suspended.

In June 2026, the United States House Committee on Ethics began investigating Gomez on sexual misconduct allegations after a panel on the committee discovered other sexual misconduct allegations towards Gomez. One former Gomez staffer alleged that Gomez had sexually harassed and assaulted her. In response, Gomez said "I made personal mistakes outside my marriage" but "my actions were consensual".

=== Committee assignments ===
For the 119th Congress:

- Committee on Ways and Means
  - Subcommittee on Tax
  - Subcommittee on Work and Welfare
  - Subcommittee on Health Care and Financial Services
- Permanent Select Committee on Intelligence
  - Subcommittee on Central Intelligence Agency (ranking member)
  - Subcommittee on National Intelligence Enterprise

=== Caucus memberships ===
Gomez is a member of several dozen caucuses. A full list is available at his website.

- Black Maternal Health Caucus
- Congressional Dads Caucus (Chair)
- Congressional Medicare for all Caucus
- Congressional Progressive Caucus
- Congressional Hispanic Caucus
- Congressional Asian Pacific American Caucus
- Congressional Taiwan Caucus
- Congressional LGBTQ Equality Caucus
- Congressional Pro-Choice Caucus
- Future Forum
- Congressional Freethought Caucus

== Political positions ==
=== Abortion ===
Gomez has a 100% rating from NARAL Pro-Choice America and an F grade from the Susan B. Anthony List for his abortion-related voting record. Gomez opposed the overturning of Roe v. Wade.

=== Artificial intelligence and data centers ===
Gomez is endorsed by Leading the Future, a Super PAC funded by the AI industry that opposes AI safety regulations.

=== Climate and environment ===
In 2025, Gomez received a score of 91% from the League of Conservation Voters, and a lifetime score of 97%. Gomez had supported H.R. 471, which the LCV criticized as rolling back critical environmental protections and removing certain Endangered Species Act requirements.

=== Cryptocurrency ===
Gomez supports cryptocurrency industry priorities and voted for the GENIUS Act and the CLARITY Act. In 2024, Fairshake, a cryptocurrency industry SuperPAC, spent $511,000 to support his re-election bid. Crypto industry lobbyist Stand With Crypto gave Gomez an "A" rating.

=== LGBTQ rights ===
Gomez received a score of 100 from the Human Rights Campaign for both the 115th and 116th Congresses.

=== Israel–Palestine ===
Gomez supports taxpayer-funded military aid to Israel. Gomez is endorsed by the American Israel Public Affairs Committee (AIPAC), which praised Gomez for condemning Boycott Divestment Sanctions and supporting the War Reserve Stockpile Ammunition-Israel. In 2024, AIPAC spent over $2.3 million to support Gomez. Gomez is also endorsed by Democratic Majority for Israel. Gomez voted to support Israel after the October 7 attacks.

== Electoral history ==
=== 2014 California State Assembly election ===
California's 51st State Assembly district election, 2014
Primary election
Party	Candidate	Votes	%
Democratic	Jimmy Gomez (incumbent)	20,621	99.7
Republican	Stephen C. Smith (write-in)	54	0.3
Total votes		20,675	100.0
General election
Democratic	Jimmy Gomez (incumbent)	42,261	83.6
Republican	Stephen C. Smith	8,277	16.4
Total votes		50,538	100.0
Democratic hold			

=== 2016 California State Assembly election ===
California's 51st State Assembly district election, 2016
Primary election
Party	Candidate	Votes	%
Democratic	Jimmy Gomez (incumbent)	62,366	100.0
Libertarian	Mike Everling (write-in)	7	0.0
Total votes		62,373	100.0
General election
Democratic	Jimmy Gomez (incumbent)	110,036	86.1
Libertarian	Mike Everling	17,724	13.9
Total votes		127,760	100.0
Democratic hold			

=== 2017 congressional special election ===
California's 34th congressional district special general election, 2017
Party	Candidate	Votes	%
Democratic	Jimmy Gomez	25,569	59.2%
Democratic	Robert Lee Ahn	17,610	40.8%
Total votes		43,179	100.00
Democratic hold			

=== 2018 congressional election ===
California's 34th congressional district election, 2018
Primary election
Party	Candidate	Votes	%
Democratic	Jimmy Gomez (incumbent)	54,661	78.7
Green	Kenneth Mejia	8,987	12.9
Libertarian	Angela Elise McArdle	5,804	8.4
Total votes		69,452	100.0
General election
Democratic	Jimmy Gomez (incumbent)	110,195	72.5
Green	Kenneth Mejia	41,711	27.5
Total votes		151,906	100.0
Democratic hold			

New York Times Results

=== 2020 congressional election ===
California's 34th congressional district, 2020
Primary election
Party	Candidate	Votes	%
Democratic	Jimmy Gomez (incumbent)	57,066	52.0
Democratic	David Kim	23,055	21.0
Democratic	Frances Yasmeen Motiwalla	14,961	13.6
Republican	Joanne L. Wright	8,482	7.7
Democratic	Keanakay Scott	6,089	5.6
Total votes		109,653	100.0
General election
Democratic	Jimmy Gomez (incumbent)	108,792	53.0
Democratic	David Kim	96,554	47.0
Total votes		205,346	100.0
Democratic hold			

=== 2022 congressional election ===
California's 34th congressional district, 2022
Primary election
Party	Candidate	Votes	%
Democratic	Jimmy Gomez (incumbent)	45,376	50.7
Democratic	David Kim	34,921	39.0
Republican	Clifton VonBuck	9,150	10.2
Total votes		89,447	100.0
General election
Democratic	Jimmy Gomez (incumbent)	62,244	51.2
Democratic	David Kim	59,223	48.8
Total votes		121,467	100.0
Democratic hold			

=== 2024 congressional election ===
California's 34th congressional district, 2024
Primary election
Party	Candidate	Votes	%
Democratic	Jimmy Gomez (incumbent)	41,611	51.2
Democratic	David Kim	22,703	27.9
Republican	Calvin Lee	11,495	14.1
Peace and Freedom	Aaron Reveles	3,223	4.0
Democratic	David Ferrell	2,312	2.8
Total votes		81,344	100.0
General election
Democratic	Jimmy Gomez (incumbent)	105,394	55.6
Democratic	David Kim	84,020	44.4
Total votes		189,414	100.0
Democratic hold			

== Personal life ==
Gomez is married to Mary Hodge, an aide to former Los Angeles mayor and former United States Ambassador to India Eric Garcetti. They live in the Eagle Rock neighborhood of Los Angeles. They have one son. As a result of the House Ethics Committee's investigation into his alleged sexual misconduct, Gomez admitted he had previously had an affair, saying to CNN that he had made "personal mistakes outside my marriage that have caused real pain to my wife and family". Gomez said he had sought professional help to address his issues. Gomez was a friend of Eric Swalwell and co-chaired his campaign in the 2026 California gubernatorial election until sexual misconduct allegations surfaced against Swalwell which led to him distancing himself from the campaign.

== Awards ==
- 2022 NHMC Impact Awards: Washington D.C. (Impact Award Public Service)

== See also ==
- List of Harvard University politicians
- List of Hispanic and Latino Americans in the United States Congress

U.S. House of Representatives
Preceded by Xavier Becerra	Member of the U.S. House of Representatives from California's 34th congressional district 2017–present	Incumbent
U.S. order of precedence (ceremonial)
Preceded by Ron Estes	United States representatives by seniority 180th	Succeeded by Ralph Norman
