= Temple Beth Israel (Macon, Georgia) =

Reform synagogue in Georgia, United States

- Hebrew: בית ישראל
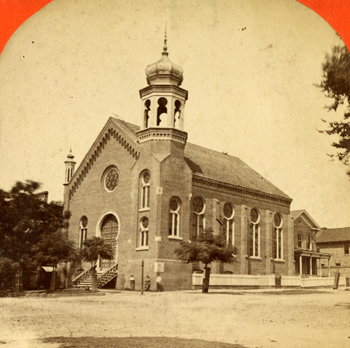
- Beth Israel synagogue, c. 1876

- Location in Georgia

Religion
- Affiliation: Reform Judaism
- Ecclesiastical or organizational status: Synagogue
- Leadership: Rabbi Elizabeth Bahar; Rabbi Larry Schlesinger (Emeritus)
- Status: Active

Location
- Location: 892 Cherry Street, Macon, Georgia
- Country: United States
- Interactive map of Temple Beth Israel
- Coordinates: 32°50′21″N 83°38′01″W

Architecture
- Type: Synagogue
- Style: Neoclassical
- Established: 1859 (as a congregation)
- Completed: 1871 (Poplar Street); 1902 (Cherry Street)
- Dome: One

Website
- tbimacon.org

Temple Beth Israel listed at its original location in Sholes' Directory of the City of Macon, 1894

Temple Beth Israel (Hebrew: בית ישראל, lit. 'House of Israel') is a Reform Jewish congregation and synagogue located at 892 Cherry Street in Macon, Georgia, in the United States.

Formed in 1859 by Jews of German background as Congregation Kahal Kadosh Beth Israel, it was originally Orthodox, and followed the German minhag.

The congregation constructed its first building on the corner of Poplar and Second Streets from 1871 to 1874. The congregation's current Neoclassical building was constructed on the corner of Cherry and Spring Streets in 1902.

Rabbi Elizabeth Bahar has served as the congregation's rabbi since 2020. Rabbi Larry Schlesinger retired in June 2017 and was appointed Rabbi Emeritus.

In June 2023, the synagogue was the subject of antisemitic and anti-LGBTQ attacks from the Goyim Defense League and Jon Minadeo II.
