= 2018 United States Senate election in California =

- November 6, 2018
- Turnout: 56.42% ▲
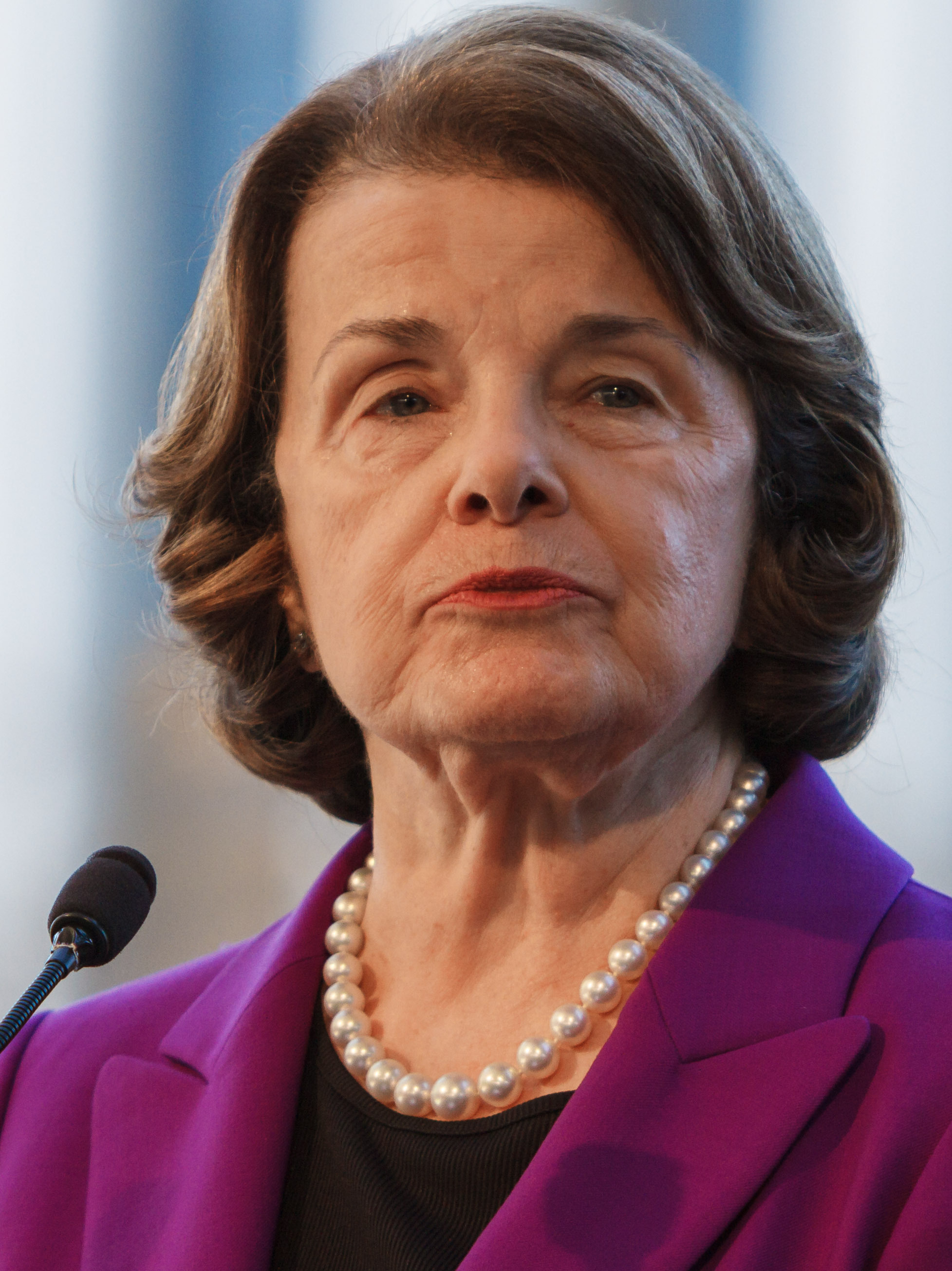

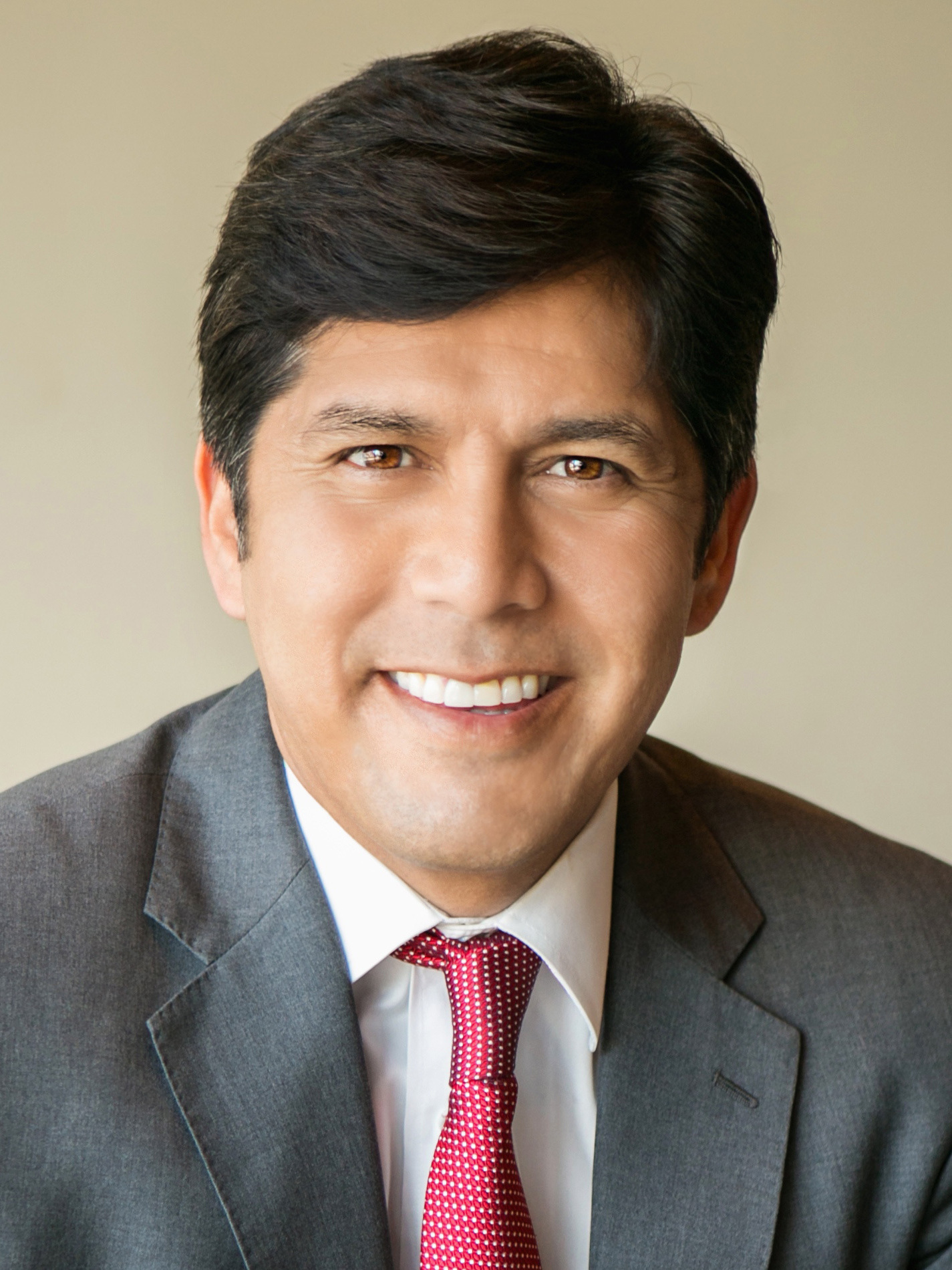
Candidate	Dianne Feinstein	Kevin de León
Party	Democratic	Democratic
Popular vote	6,019,422	5,093,942
Percentage	54.16%	45.84%
- Feinstein: 50–60% 60–70% de León: 50–60% 60–70% 70–80%
U.S. senator before election
Dianne Feinstein
Democratic
Elected U.S. Senator
Dianne Feinstein
Democratic

The 2018 United States Senate election in California took place on November 6, 2018, to elect a member of the United States Senate to represent California, concurrently with other elections to the United States Senate, elections to the United States House of Representatives, and various state and local elections.

Under California's non-partisan blanket primary law, all candidates appear on the same ballot, regardless of party. In the primary, voters may vote for any candidate, regardless of their party affiliation. In the California system, the top two finishers — regardless of party — advance to the general election in November, even if a candidate receives a majority of the votes cast in the primary election. Washington and Louisiana have similar "jungle primary" style processes for U.S. Senate elections, as does Mississippi for U.S. Senate special elections.

The candidate filing deadline was March 8, 2018, and the primary election was held on June 5, 2018.

Democratic incumbent Dianne Feinstein won re-election in 2012 with 63% of the vote, taking the record for the most popular votes in any U.S. Senate election in history, with 7.86 million votes. Feinstein, at the time, was the ranking member of the Senate Judiciary Committee. She turned 85 years old in 2018, leading some to speculate that she would retire in January 2019, as her long-time colleague Barbara Boxer did in January 2017. However, Feinstein ran for re-election to her fifth full term, winning 44.2% of the vote in the top-two primary; she faced Democratic challenger Kevin de León in the general election, who won 12.1% of the primary vote. For the second time since direct elections to the Senate began after the passage of the Seventeenth Amendment in 1913, no Republican appeared on the general election ballot for the U.S. Senate in California. The highest Republican finisher in the primary won only 8.3 percent of the vote, and the 10 Republicans only won 31.2 percent of the vote among them. Briefly, during the early stages of the primary, Patrick Little, a Neo-Nazi running as a Republican polled at 18% which at the time put him in second place and the likely runoff candidate against Feinstein, however, his campaign collapsed after the media reported on his views.

In the general election, Feinstein defeated de León by an eight-point margin, 54% to 46%. This was Feinstein's closest election since 1994, as well as her last run for elected office, as she died in office in September 2023.

== Candidates ==
=== Democratic Party ===
==== Advanced to general ====
- Kevin de León, President pro tempore of the California State Senate
- Dianne Feinstein, incumbent U.S. Senator

==== Eliminated in primary ====
- Adrienne Nicole Edwards, Vice Chairwoman on the HDT Community Development Foundation board
- Pat Harris, attorney
- Alison Hartson, national director of Wolf PAC
- David Hildebrand, legislative analyst
- Herbert G. Peters, retired aerospace engineer and candidate for U.S. Senate in California in 2016
- Douglas Howard Pierce
- Gerald Plummer
- Donnie O. Turner, Air Force veteran

==== Withdrawn ====
- Topher Brennan
- John Melendez, television writer and radio personality
- Steve Stokes, candidate for the U.S. Senate in 2016

==== Declined ====
- Ana Kasparian, co-host of The Young Turks
- Joe Sanberg, entrepreneur and investor
- Tom Steyer, hedge fund manager
- Cenk Uygur, host of The Young Turks

=== Republican Party ===
==== Declared ====
- Arun K. Bhumitra, businessman
- James P. Bradley, businessman
- Jack Crew, bus driver
- Erin Cruz, published author
- Rocky De La Fuente, entrepreneur and perennial candidate
- Jerry Joseph Laws, candidate for the U.S. Senate in 2016
- Patrick Little, neo-Nazi and Holocaust denier (denounced by California Republican Party)
- Kevin Mottus, candidate for the U.S. Senate in 2016
- Mario Nabliba, scientist
- Tom Palzer, activist, retired city planner and candidate for the U.S. Senate in 2016
- Paul Allen Taylor, businessman

==== Withdrawn ====
- Donald R. Adams, businessman
- Gary Coson
- John Estrada
- Timothy Charles Kalemkarian, perennial candidate
- Ernie Konnyu, former U.S. Representative
- Caren Lancona, businesswoman
- Jazmina Saavedra, businesswoman and activist
- Stephen James Schrader, veteran

==== Declined ====
- Kevin Faulconer, mayor of San Diego
- Caitlyn Jenner, 1976 Olympic gold medalist and television personality
- Arnold Schwarzenegger, actor and former Governor of California
- Ashley Swearengin, former mayor of Fresno

=== Libertarian Party ===
==== Declared ====
- Derrick Michael Reid, retired attorney and engineer and candidate for president in 2016

=== Green Party ===
==== Declared ====
- Michael V. Ziesing (write-in)

=== Peace and Freedom Party ===
==== Declared ====
- John Thompson Parker

=== No party preference ===
==== Declared ====
- Colleen Shea Fernald, perennial candidate
- Rash Bihari Ghosh
- Tim Gildersleeve, businessman and researcher
- Michael Fahmy Girgis
- Don J. Grundmann, California Constitution Party chairman and perennial candidate (Constitution Party) (Note: No ballot access: Constitution Party and Socialist Equality Party. Don J. Grundmann (C) and David Moore (SEP) appear on ballot as "No party preference".)
- Jason M. Hanania
- David Moore (Socialist Equality Party)
- Lee W. Olson
- Ursula M. Schilling (write-in)
- Ling Ling Shi, evangelist

==== Withdrawn ====
- Jerry Leon Carroll
- Michael Eisen, biologist
- Charles Junior Hodge
- Richard Thomas Mead
- Clifton Roberts (Humane Party)

== Primary election ==
=== Endorsements ===
Dianne Feinstein (D)

U.S. presidents

- Barack Obama, 44th President of the United States

U.S. vice presidents

- Joe Biden, 47th Vice President of the United States

U.S. Senators

- Barbara Boxer, former U.S. Senator (D-CA)
- Kamala Harris, U.S. Senator (D-CA)

U.S. Representatives

- Pete Aguilar, U.S. Representative (D-CA-31)
- Karen Bass, U.S. Representative (D-CA-37)
- Ami Bera, U.S. Representative (D-CA-7)
- Julia Brownley, U.S. Representative (D-CA-26)
- Judy Chu, U.S. Representative (D-CA-27)
- Salud Carbajal, U.S. Representative (D-CA-24)
- Jim Costa, U.S. Representative (D-CA-16)
- Susan Davis, U.S. Representative (D-CA-53)
- Mark DeSaulnier, U.S. Representative (D-CA-11)
- John Garamendi, U.S. Representative (D-CA-3)
- Ted Lieu, U.S. Representative (D-CA-33)
- Alan Lowenthal, U.S. Representative (D-CA-47)
- Doris Matsui, U.S. Representative (D-CA-6)
- Grace Napolitano, U.S. Representative (D-CA-32)
- Jimmy Panetta, U.S. Representative (D-CA-20)
- Nancy Pelosi, House Minority Leader and U.S. Representative (D-CA-12)
- Scott Peters, U.S. Representative (D-CA-52)
- Raul Ruiz, U.S. Representative (D-CA-36)
- Adam Schiff, U.S. Representative (D-CA-28)
- Brad Sherman, U. S. Representative (D-CA-30)
- Jackie Speier, U.S. Representative (D-CA-14)
- Eric Swalwell, U.S. Representative (D-CA-15)
- Mark Takano, U.S. Representative (D-CA-41)
- Mike Thompson, U.S. Representative (D-CA-5)
- Norma Torres, U.S. Representative (D-CA-35)
- Juan Vargas, U.S. Representative (D-CA-51)
- Maxine Waters, U.S. Representative (D-CA-43)

State officials

- Cecilia Aguiar-Curry, California State Assemblymember (D-4)
- Jerry Brown, Governor of California
- Anna Caballero, California State Assemblymember (D-30)
- Susan Talamantes Eggman, California State Assemblymember (D-13)
- Cristina Garcia, California State Assemblymember (D-58)
- Jacqui Irwin, California State Assemblymember (D-44)
- Gavin Newsom, Lieutenant Governor of California
- Alex Padilla, California Secretary of State
- Anthony Rendon, California State Assemblyman and speaker of the Assembly (D-63)
- Blanca E. Rubio, California State Assemblymember (D-48)

Local officials

- Kathryn Barger, member of the Los Angeles County Board of Supervisors (Republican)
- Eric Garcetti, Mayor of Los Angeles
- Janice Hahn, member of the Los Angeles County Board of Supervisors
- Sheila Kuehl, member of the Los Angeles County Board of Supervisors
- Vicki Reynolds, former Mayor of Beverly Hills
- Mark Ridley-Thomas, member of the Los Angeles County Board of Supervisors
- Hilda Solis, member of the Los Angeles County Board of Supervisors
- Darrell Steinberg, Mayor of Sacramento

Organizations

- Emily's List
- Equality California
- Human Rights Campaign
- Palmer Report
- Project 100

Newspapers

- Bay Area Reporter
- East Bay Times
- Los Angeles Downtown News
- Los Angeles Sentinel
- Los Angeles Times
- Marin Independent Journal
- The Modesto Bee
- Monterey Herald
- Sacramento Bee
- San Diego Union-Tribune
- San Francisco Chronicle
- San Jose Mercury News
- Santa Barbara Independent
- Santa Cruz Sentinel
Kevin de León (D)

Individuals

- Tom Steyer, billionaire, hedge fund manager, philanthropist, environmentalist, liberal activist, and fundraiser

U.S. Representatives

- Lou Correa, U.S. Representative (D-CA-46)
- Jimmy Gomez, U.S. Representative (D-CA-34)
- Raul Grijalva, U.S. Representative (D-AZ-3)
- Ro Khanna, U.S. Representative (D-CA-17)

State officials

- Toni Atkins, President pro tempore of the California State Senate (D-39)
- Jim Beall, California State Senator (D-15)
- Steve Bradford, California State Senator (D-35)
- Kansen Chu, California State Assemblymember (D-25)
- Dean Florez, former California State Senator
- Jim Frazier, California State Assemblymember (D-11)
- Cathleen Galgiani, California State Senator (D-5)
- Eduardo Garcia, California State Assemblymember (D-56)
- Lorena Gonzalez-Fletcher, California State Assemblymember (D-80)
- Ed Hernandez, California State Senator, candidate for Lieutenant Governor of California
- Ben Hueso, California State Senator (D-40)
- Hannah-Beth Jackson, California State Senator (D-19)
- Reggie Jones-Sawyer, California State Assemblymember (D-59)
- Ash Kalra, California State Assemblymember (D-27)
- Ricardo Lara, California State Senator (D-33), candidate for California Insurance Commissioner
- Kevin McCarty, California State Assemblymember (D-7)
- Mike McGuire, California State Senator (D-2)
- Jose Medina, California State Assemblymember (D-61)
- Holly Mitchell, California State Senator (D-30)
- Bill Monning, California State Senator, Majority Leader (D-17)
- Cindy Montanez, former California State Assemblymember
- Josh Newman, California State Senator (D-29)
- Richard Pan, California State Senator (D-6)
- Anthony Portantino, California State Senator (D-25)
- Eloise Reyes, California State Assemblymember (D-47)
- Miguel Santiago, California State Assemblymember (D-53)
- Henry Stern, California State Senator (D-27)

Local officials

- Mike Bonin, member of the Los Angeles City Council
- Joe Buscaino, member of the Los Angeles City Council
- Sandra Lee Fewer, member of the San Francisco Board of Supervisors
- Monica Garcia, Los Angeles Unified School District Board president
- Robert Garcia, Mayor of Long Beach
- Jose Huizar, member of the Los Angeles City Council
- Jane Kim, member of the San Francisco Board of Supervisors
- Aaron Peskin, member of the San Francisco Board of Supervisors
- Curren Price, member of the Los Angeles City Council
- Hillary Ronen, member of the San Francisco Board of Supervisors
- Mary Salas, mayor of Chula Vista
- Norman Yee, member of the San Francisco Board of Supervisors

Organizations

- Armenian National Committee of America
- Cal Berkeley Democrats
- California Democratic Party
- California Labor Federation (AFL-CIO)
- California Nurses Association
- Climate Hawks Vote
- Democracy for America
- International Brotherhood of Teamsters Joint Council 42
- Service Employees International Union
- United Food and Commercial Workers Union
Pat Harris (D)

Organizations

- F.U.N. Progressives
- Tri-Valley Democratic Club

Individuals

- Jeff Pantukhoff, founder of The Whaleman Foundation
Alison Hartson (D)

Individuals

- Derek Cressman, political reform advocate, author and former California Secretary of State candidate
- Kyle Kulinski, host of Secular Talk
- Abby Martin, host of The Empire Files
- Nomi Prins, journalist
- Cenk Uygur, host of The Young Turks

Organizations

- California for Bernie 2020
- Demand Universal Healthcare
- Justice Democrats
- Our Revolution Lake County
- Our Revolution San Joaquin County
- Our Revolution West Marin
- ProgressivesUnite
- The Young Turks
David Hildebrand (D)

Local officials

- Vinnie Bacon, Vice Mayor of Fremont, Fremont City Council member
- Jovanka Beckles, former Richmond City Council member, candidate for the State Assembly - District 15
- Gayle McLaughlin, former Mayor of Richmond, candidate for Lieutenant Governor
- Porsche Middleton, Citrus Heights Planning Commissioner, candidate for the Citrus Heights City Council
- Noah Phillips, Deputy District Attorney for Sacramento County, candidate for Sacramento County District Attorney

Individuals

- Michael Bracamontes, civil rights attorney, former candidate for California governor
- Stephen Jaffe, employment attorney, candidate for U.S. Congress
- Kevin Murray, professor of politics, Humboldt State University
- Stephen Seager, mental health expert, author, documentary filmmaker

Organizations

- Bernie Sanders Megagroup 2020
- Candidates with a Contract
- Courageous Resistance of Humboldt - Our Revolution
- Feel the Bern Democratic Club of Los Angeles
- Labor Campaign for Single Payer
- Not Me Us - We are the Revolution
- Our Revolution West Marin
- The People's News
- Stanislaus County for Bernie 2020
- Ventura County Activists for Bernie Sanders 2020 #OurRevolution
- Wellstone Progressive Democrats of Sacramento - Our Revolution
- Yolo County Progressives - Our Revolution
James Bradley (R)

Individuals

- Carl DeMaio, former San Diego city councilman
Erin Cruz (R)

Individuals

- Marco Gutierrez, co-founder of Latinos for Trump
- Juan M. Hidalgo Jr. Republican candidate for California's 51st congressional district and retired USMC Sergeant Major
- Stelian Onufrei, small business owner and former Republican candidate for California's 48th congressional district
- Robert "Buzz" Patterson, retired USAF lieutenant colonel and author of Dereliction of Duty: The Eyewitness Account of How Bill Clinton Compromised America's National Security (2003)
- Shastina Sandman, California entrepreneur and Republican candidate for California's 48th congressional district

Organizations

- American Independent Party
- California Republican Assembly
- Del Norte County GOP
- North County Conservatives
- Santa Barbara County GOP
- Southern California Silent Majority MAGA (OC)
Patrick Little (R)

Politicians

- David Duke, white nationalist and former Louisiana State Representative
Derrick Michael Reid (L)

Organizations

- Financial Survival Network
- Libertarian Party of California
John Thompson Parker (PFP)

Organizations

- Green Party of California

=== Fundraising ===
Campaign finance reports as of May 16, 2018
Candidate	Total receipts	Total disbursements	Cash on hand
Dianne Feinstein (D)	$9,953,612	$5,342,658	$7,035,307
Kevin de León (D)	$1,135,538	$441,847	$693,689
Pat Harris (D)	$703,982	$650,225	$51,017
Alison Hartson (D)	$298,296	$189,652	$108,643
Arun K. Bhumitra (R)	$53,668	$40,835	$12,832
David Hildebrand (D)	$27,111	$25,816	$1,294
Erin Cruz (R)	$26,442	$23,190	$3,251
Douglas Howard Pierce (D)	$9,000	$62,392	$11,200
Paul Allen Taylor (R)	$9,128	$8,803	$324
Tom Palzer (R)	$0	$45	$45
David Moore (SEP)	$3,480	$3,480	$0
Source: Federal Election Commission

=== Polling ===
Poll source	Date(s) administered	Sample size	Margin of error	James P. Bradley (R)	Erin Cruz (R)	Pat Harris (D)	Rocky De La Fuente (R)	Kevin de León (D)	Dianne Feinstein (D)	Alison Hartson (D)	Patrick Little (R)	Other / Undecided
UC Berkeley	May 22−28, 2018	2,106	± 3.5%	7%	–	–	–	11%	36%	–	–	46%
Emerson College	May 21–24, 2018	600	± 4.2%	–	5%	6%	4%	6%	38%	4%	–	38%
YouGov	May 12–24, 2018	1,113	± 4.0%	6%	2%	2%	4%	11%	36%	1%	1%	37%
SurveyUSA	May 21, 2018	678	± 6.1%	9%	2%	2%	3%	11%	36%	1%	0%	35%
Public Policy Institute of California	May 11–20, 2018	901	± 4.1%	–	–	–	–	17%	41%	–	–	41%
USC Dornsife/Los Angeles Times	April 18 – May 18, 2018	517	± 4.0%	3%	1%	2%	0%	7%	31%	1%	2%	51%
Gravis Marketing	May 4–5, 2018	525	± 4.3%	19%	13%	–	–	8%	32%	6%	–	21%
SurveyUSA	April 19–23, 2018	520	± 5.5%	–	–	–	8%	8%	38%	4%	18%	23%
UC Berkeley	April 16–22, 2018	1,738	± 3.5%	10%	–	–	–	11%	28%	–	–	49%
Public Policy Institute of California	March 4–13, 2018	1,706	± 3.4%	–	–	–	–	16%	42%	–	–	41%
Public Policy Institute of California	January 21–30, 2018	1,705	± 3.2%	–	–	–	–	17%	46%	–	–	36%
UC Berkeley	December 7–16, 2017	672	± 3.8%	–	–	–	–	27%	41%	–	–	32%
Public Policy Institute of California	November 10–19, 2017	1,070	± 4.3%	–	–	–	–	21%	45%	–	–	34%
Sextant Strategies & Research	September 2017	1,197	± 3.4%	–	–	–	–	15%	38%	–	–	46%

Hypothetical polling

with Timothy Charles Kalemkarian, Caren Lancona, John Melendez, and Stephen Schrader

Poll source	Date(s) administered	Sample size	Margin of error	Kevin de León (D)	Dianne Feinstein (D)	Timothy Charles Kalemkarian (R)	Caren Lancona (R)	Patrick Little (R)	John Melendez (D)	Stephen Schrader (R)	Other / Undecided
SurveyUSA	March 22–25, 2018	517	± 5.0%	5%	31%	5%	2%	5%	5%	7%	42%
SurveyUSA	January 7–9, 2018	506	± 4.4%	4%	34%	6%	5%	5%	2%	5%	38%

with Tom Steyer

Poll source	Date(s) administered	Sample size	Margin of error	Kevin de León (D)	Dianne Feinstein (D)	Timothy Charles Kalemkarian (R)	Caren Lancona (R)	Patrick Little (R)	Tom Steyer (D)	Other / Undecided
SurveyUSA	January–9, 2018	506	± 4.4%	3%	29%	5%	5%	5%	5%	46%

with John Cox

Poll source	Date(s) administered	Sample size	Margin of error	John Cox (R)	Kevin de León (D)	Dianne Feinstein (D)	Undecided
Sextant Strategies & Research	September 2017	1,197	± 3.4%	32%	14%	40%	14%

with Xavier Becerra, Kevin Faulconer, Brad Sherman, Eric Swalwell, and Ashley Swearingin

Poll source	Date(s) administered	Sample size	Margin of error	Xavier Becerra (D)	Kevin de León (D)	Kevin Faulconer (R)	Brad Sherman (D)	Eric Swalwell (D)	Ashley Swearingin (R)	Undecided
Public Policy Polling	January 17–18, 2017	882	± 3.3%	21%	4%	18%	11%	5%	13%	28%

=== Results ===
Primary results by county Feinstein: 10–20%; 20–30%; 30–40%; 40–50%; 50–60%; 60–70%; Feinstein/Bradley tie: 10–20%

Nonpartisan blanket primary results
Party	Candidate	Votes	%
Democratic	Dianne Feinstein (incumbent)	2,947,035	44.12%
Democratic	Kevin de León	805,446	12.07%
Republican	James P. Bradley	556,252	8.34%
Republican	Arun K. Bhumitra	350,815	5.26%
Republican	Paul A. Taylor	323,533	4.85%
Republican	Erin Cruz	267,494	4.01%
Republican	Tom Palzer	205,183	3.08%
Democratic	Alison Hartson	147,061	2.21%
Republican	Rocky De La Fuente	135,278	2.03%
Democratic	Pat Harris	126,947	1.90%
Republican	John "Jack" Crew	93,806	1.41%
Republican	Patrick Little	89,867	1.35%
Republican	Kevin Mottus	87,646	1.31%
Republican	Jerry Joseph Laws	67,140	1.01%
Libertarian	Derrick Michael Reid	59,999	0.90%
Democratic	Adrienne Nicole Edwards	56,172	0.84%
Democratic	Douglas Howard Pierce	42,671	0.64%
Republican	Mario Nabliba	39,209	0.59%
Democratic	David Hildebrand	30,305	0.45%
Democratic	Donnie O. Turner	30,101	0.45%
Democratic	Herbert G. Peters	27,468	0.41%
No party preference	David Moore	24,614	0.37%
No party preference	Ling Ling Shi	23,506	0.35%
Peace and Freedom	John Thompson Parker	22,825	0.34%
No party preference	Lee Olson	20,393	0.31%
Democratic	Gerald Plummer	18,234	0.27%
No party preference	Jason M. Hanania	18,171	0.27%
No party preference	Don J. Grundmann	15,125	0.23%
No party preference	Colleen Shea Fernald	13,536	0.20%
No party preference	Rash Bihari Ghosh	12,557	0.19%
No party preference	Tim Gildersleeve	8,482	0.13%
No party preference	Michael Fahmy Girgis	2,986	0.05%
Green	Michael V. Ziesing (write-in)	842	0.01%
No party preference	Ursula M. Schilling (write-in)	17	0.00%
Democratic	Seelam Prabhakar Reddy (write-in)	4	0.00%
Total votes		6,670,720	100.00%

Democratic candidates won a combined total of 4,231,444 votes, Republican candidates 2,216,223 votes, and other candidates 223,053 votes.

== General election ==
=== Debates ===
- Complete video of debate, October 17, 2018

=== Endorsements ===
Dianne Feinstein (D)

Former Executive Branch officials

- Barack Obama, 44th President of the United States
- Joe Biden, 47th Vice President of the United States

U.S. Senators

- Barbara Boxer, former U.S. Senator (D-CA)
- Kamala Harris, U.S. Senator (D-CA)

U.S. Representatives

- Pete Aguilar, U.S. Representative (D-CA-31)
- Karen Bass, U.S. Representative (D-CA-37)
- Ami Bera, U.S. Representative (D-CA-7)
- Julia Brownley, U.S. Representative (D-CA-26)
- Salud Carbajal, U.S. Representative (D-CA-24)
- Judy Chu, U.S. Representative (D-CA-27)
- Jim Costa, U.S. Representative (D-CA-16)
- Susan Davis, U.S. Representative (D-CA-53)
- Mark DeSaulnier, U.S. Representative (D-CA-11)
- John Garamendi, U.S. Representative (D-CA-3)
- Ted Lieu, U.S. Representative (D-CA-33)
- Alan Lowenthal, U.S. Representative (D-CA-47)
- Doris Matsui, U.S. Representative (D-CA-6)
- Grace Napolitano, U.S. Representative (D-CA-32)
- Doug Ose, former U.S. Representative and former gubernatorial candidate in 2018 (R-CA)
- Jimmy Panetta, U.S. Representative (D-CA-20)
- Nancy Pelosi, House Minority Leader and U.S. Representative (D-CA-12)
- Scott Peters, U.S. Representative (D-CA-52)
- Raul Ruiz, U.S. Representative (D-CA-36)
- Adam Schiff, U.S. Representative (D-CA-28)
- Brad Sherman, U. S. Representative (D-CA-30)
- Jackie Speier, U.S. Representative (D-CA-14)
- Eric Swalwell, U.S. Representative (D-CA-15)
- Mark Takano, U.S. Representative (D-CA-41)
- Mike Thompson, U.S. Representative (D-CA-5)
- Norma Torres, U.S. Representative (D-CA-35)
- Juan Vargas, U.S. Representative (D-CA-51)
- Maxine Waters, U.S. Representative (D-CA-43)

State officials

- Cecilia Aguiar-Curry, California State Assemblymember (D-4)
- Jerry Brown, Governor of California
- Anna Caballero, California State Assemblymember (D-30)
- Susan Talamantes Eggman, California State Assemblymember (D-13)
- Cristina Garcia, California State Assemblymember (D-58)
- Jacqui Irwin, California State Assemblymember (D-44)
- Gavin Newsom, Lieutenant Governor of California
- Alex Padilla, California Secretary of State
- Anthony Rendon, California State Assemblyman and speaker of the Assembly (D-63)
- Blanca E. Rubio, California State Assemblymember (D-48)

Local officials

- Kathryn Barger, member of the Los Angeles County Board of Supervisors (Republican)
- Eric Garcetti, Mayor of Los Angeles
- Janice Hahn, member of the Los Angeles County Board of Supervisors
- Sheila Kuehl, member of the Los Angeles County Board of Supervisors
- Vicki Reynolds, former Mayor of Beverly Hills
- Mark Ridley-Thomas, member of the Los Angeles County Board of Supervisors
- Hilda Solis, member of the Los Angeles County Board of Supervisors
- Darrell Steinberg, Mayor of Sacramento

Organizations

- Brady Campaign to Prevent Gun Violence
- California Citrus Mutual
- EMILY's List
- Equality California
- Feminist Majority
- Human Rights Campaign
- J Street
- Los Angeles Women's Political Committee
- NARAL Pro-Choice America
- National Committee to Preserve Social Security and Medicare
- National Organization for Women
- National Women's Political Caucus
- Nisei Farmers League
- Palmer Report
- Planned Parenthood Action Fund
- Project 100
- Southwest Regional Council of Carpenters
- Western Growers Association
- West Hollywood Political Action Committee

Newspapers

- Bay Area Reporter
- East Bay Times
- Los Angeles Downtown News
- Los Angeles Sentinel
- Los Angeles Times
- Marin Independent Journal
- The Modesto Bee
- Monterey Herald
- Sacramento Bee
- San Diego Union-Tribune
- San Francisco Chronicle
- San Jose Mercury News
- Santa Barbara Independent
- Santa Cruz Sentinel
Kevin de León (D)

Individuals

- Tom Steyer, billionaire, hedge fund manager, philanthropist, environmentalist, liberal activist, and fundraiser

U.S. Representatives

- Lou Correa, U.S. Representative (D-CA-46)
- Jimmy Gomez, U.S. Representative (D-CA-34)
- Raul Grijalva, U.S. Representative (D-AZ-3)
- Ro Khanna, U.S. Representative (D-CA-17)

State officials

- Toni Atkins, President pro tempore of the California State Senate (D-39)
- Jim Beall, California State Senator (D-15)
- Steve Bradford, California State Senator (D-35)
- Kansen Chu, California State Assemblymember (D-25)
- Dean Florez, former California State Senator
- Jim Frazier, California State Assemblymember (D-11)
- Cathleen Galgiani, California State Senator (D-5)
- Eduardo Garcia, California State Assemblymember (D-56)
- Lorena Gonzalez-Fletcher, California State Assemblymember (D-80)
- Ed Hernandez, California State Senator, candidate for Lieutenant Governor of California
- Ben Hueso, California State Senator (D-40)
- Hannah-Beth Jackson, California State Senator (D-19)
- Reggie Jones-Sawyer, California State Assemblymember (D-59)
- Ash Kalra, California State Assemblymember (D-27)
- Ricardo Lara, California State Senator (D-33), candidate for California Insurance Commissioner
- Kevin McCarty, California State Assemblymember (D-7)
- Mike McGuire, California State Senator (D-2)
- Jose Medina, California State Assemblymember (D-61)
- Holly Mitchell, California State Senator (D-30)
- Bill Monning, California State Senator, Majority Leader (D-17)
- Cindy Montanez, former California State Assemblymember
- Josh Newman, former California State Senator
- Richard Pan, California State Senator (D-6)
- Anthony Portantino, California State Senator (D-25)
- Eloise Reyes, California State Assemblymember (D-47)
- Miguel Santiago, California State Assemblymember (D-53)
- Henry Stern, California State Senator (D-27)

Local officials

- Mike Bonin, member of the Los Angeles City Council
- Joe Buscaino, member of the Los Angeles City Council
- Sandra Lee Fewer, member of the San Francisco Board of Supervisors
- Monica Garcia, Los Angeles Unified School District Board President
- Robert Garcia, Mayor of Long Beach
- Jose Huizar, member of the Los Angeles City Council
- Jane Kim, member of the San Francisco Board of Supervisors
- Aaron Peskin, member of the San Francisco Board of Supervisors
- Curren Price, member of the Los Angeles City Council
- Hillary Ronen, member of the San Francisco Board of Supervisors
- Mary Salas, Mayor of Chula Vista
- Norman Yee, member of the San Francisco Board of Supervisors

Organizations

- Armenian National Committee of America
- Cal Berkeley Democrats
- California Democratic Party
- California Labor Federation (AFL-CIO)
- California Nurses Association
- Climate Hawks Vote
- Democracy for America
- International Brotherhood of Teamsters Joint Council 42
- Service Employees International Union
- United Food and Commercial Workers Union

=== Fundraising ===
Campaign finance reports as of October 19, 2018
Candidate	Total receipts	Total disbursements	Cash on hand
Dianne Feinstein (D)	$21,100,086.64	$17,896,407.61	$4,069,222.18
Kevin de León (D)	$1,572,160.70	$1,263,113.97	$309,045.58
Source: Federal Election Commission

=== Predictions ===
Because of California's top-two runoff system, the seat was guaranteed to be won/held by a Democrat since the initial primary produced two Democratic candidates.

Source	Ranking	As of
The Cook Political Report	Solid D (Feinstein)	September 28, 2018
Inside Elections	Solid D (Feinstein)	November 14, 2017
Sabato's Crystal Ball	Safe D (Feinstein)	November 15, 2017
Daily Kos	Safe D (Feinstein)	April 9, 2018
Fox News	Likely D (Feinstein) (Note: Highest rating given)	July 9, 2018
CNN	Solid D (Feinstein)	July 12, 2018
RealClearPolitics	Safe D (Feinstein)	June 27, 2018
FiveThirtyEight	Solid D (Feinstein)	October 20, 2018

=== Polling ===
View source data.

Poll source	Date(s) administered	Sample size	Margin of error	Dianne Feinstein (D)	Kevin de León (D)	None	Other	Undecided
Change Research	November 2–4, 2018	1,108	–	42%	32%	–	–	–
Research Co.	November 1–3, 2018	450	± 4.6%	47%	28%	–	–	25%
SurveyUSA	November 1–2, 2018	806	± 4.7%	50%	36%	–	–	14%
Probolsky Research	October 25–30, 2018	900	± 3.3%	41%	35%	–	–	24%
UC Berkeley	October 19–25, 2018	1,339	± 4.0%	45%	36%	–	–	19%
YouGov	October 10–24, 2018	2,178	± 3.1%	36%	29%	19%	–	16%
Public Policy Institute of California	October 12–21, 2018	989	± 4.2%	43%	27%	23%	–	8%
Emerson College	October 17–19, 2018	671	± 4.1%	41%	23%	–	–	37%
SurveyUSA	October 12–14, 2018	762	± 4.9%	40%	26%	–	–	35%
USC Dornsife/Los Angeles Times	September 17 – October 14, 2018	794 LV	± 4.0%	44%	31%	–	–	25%
USC Dornsife/Los Angeles Times	September 17 – October 14, 2018	980 RV	± 4.0%	41%	30%	–	–	29%
1st Tuesday Campaigns	October 1–3, 2018	1,038	± 3.0%	43%	30%	–	–	27%
Vox Populi Polling	September 16–18, 2018	500	± 4.4%	55%	45%	–	–	–
Public Policy Institute of California	September 9–18, 2018	964	± 4.8%	40%	29%	23%	–	8%
Ipsos	September 5–14, 2018	1,021	± 4.0%	44%	24%	–	17%	15%
Probolsky Research (R)	August 29 – September 2, 2018	900	± 5.8%	37%	29%	–	–	34%
Public Policy Institute of California	July 8–17, 2018	1,020	± 4.3%	46%	24%	20%	–	9%
SurveyUSA	June 26–27, 2018	559	± 5.9%	46%	24%	–	–	31%
USC Dornsife/Los Angeles Times	June 6–17, 2018	767	± 4.0%	36%	18%	–	–	46%
Probolsky Research (R)	April 16–18, 2018	900	± 3.3%	38%	27%	–	–	35%
USC Dornsife/Los Angeles Times	October 27 – November 6, 2017	1,296	± 4.0%	58%	31%	31%	10%	–
Sextant Strategies & Research	September 2017	1,554	–	36%	17%	28%	–	19%

Hypothetical polling

with Feinstein, de León, and Tom Steyer

Poll source	Date(s) administered	Sample size	Margin of error	Kevin de León (D)	Dianne Feinstein (D)	Tom Steyer (D)	Not voting	Other
USC Dornsife/Los Angeles Times	October 27 – November 6, 2017	949	± 4.0%	24%	50%	17%	31%	9%

with Feinstein, de León, and John Cox

Poll source	Date(s) administered	Sample size	Margin of error	John Cox (R)	Kevin de León (D)	Dianne Feinstein (D)	Undecided
Sextant Strategies & Research	September 2017	1,197	± 3.4%	30%	15%	38%	17%

=== Results ===
2018 United States Senate election in California
Party	Candidate	Votes	%
Democratic	Dianne Feinstein (incumbent)	6,019,422	54.16%
Democratic	Kevin de León	5,093,942	45.84%
Total votes		11,113,364	100.00%
Democratic hold			

The race had an undervote of around 1.3 million votes compared to the gubernatorial election, likely by Republican voters choosing neither candidate. De León won many of the same counties and congressional districts won by Republican gubernatorial nominee John Cox, as many voters may have expressed opposition to the incumbent senator. No county voted for both Feinstein and Cox. Congressional districts 39, 45, and 48 were the only congressional districts that voted for both Feinstein and Cox.

==== By county ====
Blue represents counties won by Feinstein. Cyan represents counties won by de León.

County	Feinstein #	Feinstein %	de León #	de León %	Margin #	Margin %	Total
Alameda	318,377	58.38	226,950	41.62	91,427	16.77	545,327
Alpine	267	48.81	280	51.19	-13	-2.38	547
Amador	5,835	41.44	8,244	58.56	-2,409	-17.11	14,079
Butte	32,418	42.92	43,108	57.08	-10,690	-14.15	75,526
Calaveras	7,031	40.44	10,357	59.56	-3,326	-19.13	17,388
Colusa	1,643	35.09	3,039	64.91	-1,396	-29.82	4,682
Contra Costa	222,349	58.34	158,748	41.66	63,601	16.69	381,097
Del Norte	2,590	37.84	4,254	62.16	-1,664	-24.31	6,844
El Dorado	33,772	46.54	38,791	53.46	-5,019	-6.92	72,563
Fresno	103,491	47.68	113,557	52.32	-10,066	-4.64	217,048
Glenn	2,341	34.79	4,388	65.21	-2,047	-30.42	6,729
Humboldt	21,336	44.77	26,319	55.23	-4,983	-10.46	47,655
Imperial	13,121	43.35	17,150	56.65	-4,029	-13.31	30,271
Inyo	2,344	39.89	3,532	60.11	-1,188	-20.22	5,876
Kern	66,628	39.99	99,981	60.01	-33,353	-20.02	166,609
Kings	9,599	37.87	15,748	62.13	-6,149	-24.26	25,347
Lake	8,142	44.11	10,317	55.89	-2,175	-11.78	18,459
Lassen	2,030	29.77	4,788	70.23	-2,758	-40.45	6,818
Los Angeles	1,565,167	57.73	1,146,044	42.27	419,123	15.46	2,711,211
Madera	13,284	41.11	19,032	58.89	-5,748	-17.79	32,316
Marin	80,319	65.32	42,638	34.68	37,681	30.65	122,957
Mariposa	2,749	41.10	3,939	58.90	-1,190	-17.79	6,688
Mendocino	15,113	49.32	15,529	50.68	-416	-1.36	30,642
Merced	23,659	45.81	27,985	54.19	-4,326	-8.38	51,644
Modoc	751	28.69	1,867	71.31	-1,116	-42.63	2,618
Mono	2,001	47.67	2,197	52.33	-196	-4.67	4,198
Monterey	56,320	52.69	50,562	47.31	5,758	5.39	106,882
Napa	27,904	54.51	23,290	45.49	4,614	9.01	51,194
Nevada	22,198	48.14	23,911	51.86	-1,713	-3.72	46,109
Orange	501,678	54.38	420,814	45.62	80,864	8.77	922,492
Placer	66,578	46.46	76,733	53.54	-10,155	-7.09	143,311
Plumas	2,815	38.87	4,428	61.13	-1,613	-22.27	7,243
Riverside	269,567	49.19	278,409	50.81	-8,842	-1.61	547,976
Sacramento	241,571	53.03	213,949	46.97	27,622	6.06	455,520
San Benito	8,607	47.88	9,371	52.12	-764	-4.25	17,978
San Bernardino	233,103	49.97	233,360	50.03	-257	-0.06	466,463
San Diego	526,628	52.92	468,564	47.08	58,064	5.83	995,192
San Francisco	226,167	64.23	125,954	35.77	100,213	28.46	352,121
San Joaquin	79,088	46.13	92,351	53.87	-13,263	-7.74	171,439
San Luis Obispo	53,242	49.63	54,027	50.37	-785	-0.73	107,269
San Mateo	168,679	62.98	99,136	37.02	69,543	25.97	267,815
Santa Barbara	75,274	55.15	61,217	44.85	14,057	10.30	136,491
Santa Clara	339,866	59.78	228,642	40.22	111,224	19.56	568,508
Santa Cruz	64,178	57.51	47,416	42.49	16,762	15.02	111,594
Shasta	19,397	34.87	36,227	65.13	-16,830	-30.26	55,624
Sierra	506	38.51	808	61.49	-302	-22.98	1,314
Siskiyou	5,772	39.26	8,930	60.74	-3,158	-21.48	14,702
Solano	70,174	52.89	62,506	47.11	7,668	5.78	132,680
Sonoma	108,472	56.00	85,220	44.00	23,252	12.00	193,692
Stanislaus	58,375	42.89	77,724	57.11	-19,349	-14.22	136,099
Sutter	10,501	42.57	14,166	57.43	-3,665	-14.86	24,667
Tehama	5,435	32.57	11,253	67.43	-5,818	-34.86	16,688
Trinity	1,746	38.09	2,838	61.91	-1,092	-23.82	4,584
Tulare	33,005	39.88	49,765	60.12	-16,760	-20.25	82,770
Tuolumne	7,783	40.85	11,271	59.15	-3,488	-18.31	19,054
Ventura	137,141	51.32	130,101	48.68	7,040	2.63	267,242
Yolo	35,071	51.86	32,551	48.14	2,520	3.73	67,622
Yuba	6,224	39.17	9,666	60.83	-3,442	-21.66	15,890
Totals	6,019,422	54.16	5,093,942	45.84	925,480	8.33	11,113,364

==== By congressional district ====
Feinstein won 38 of the 53 congressional districts, with the remaining 15 going to De León, including seven held by Republicans.

District	Feinstein	De León	Representative
1st	40%	60%	Doug LaMalfa
2nd	57%	43%	Jared Huffman
3rd	47%	53%	John Garamendi
4th	45%	55%	Tom McClintock
5th	56%	44%	Mike Thompson
6th	57%	43%	Doris Matsui
7th	51%	49%	Ami Bera
8th	46%	54%	Paul Cook
9th	49%	51%	Jerry McNerney
10th	43%	57%	Josh Harder
11th	60%	40%	Mark DeSaulnier
12th	64%	36%	Nancy Pelosi
13th	59%	41%	Barbara Lee
14th	64%	36%	Jackie Speier
15th	57%	43%	Eric Swalwell
16th	48%	52%	Jim Costa
17th	60%	40%	Ro Khanna
18th	61%	39%	Anna Eshoo
19th	58%	42%	Zoe Lofgren
20th	54%	46%	Jimmy Panetta
21st	43%	57%	TJ Cox
22nd	44%	56%	Devin Nunes
23rd	40%	60%	Kevin McCarthy
24th	53%	47%	Salud Carbajal
25th	49.7%	50.3%	Katie Hill
26th	52%	48%	Julia Brownley
27th	60%	40%	Judy Chu
28th	58%	42%	Adam Schiff
29th	55%	45%	Tony Cárdenas
30th	62%	38%	Brad Sherman
31st	51%	49%	Pete Aguilar
32nd	53%	47%	Grace Napolitano
33rd	62%	38%	Ted Lieu
34th	52%	48%	Jimmy Gomez
35th	52%	48%	Norma Torres
36th	48%	52%	Raul Ruiz
37th	64%	36%	Karen Bass
38th	54%	46%	Linda Sánchez
39th	56%	44%	Gil Cisneros
40th	51%	49%	Lucille Roybal-Allard
41st	52%	48%	Mark Takano
42nd	48%	52%	Ken Calvert
43rd	62%	38%	Maxine Waters
44th	57%	43%	Nanette Barragán
45th	54%	46%	Katie Porter
46th	53%	47%	Lou Correa
47th	55%	45%	Alan Lowenthal
48th	55%	45%	Harley Rouda
49th	53%	47%	Mike Levin
50th	48%	52%	Duncan Hunter
51st	48%	52%	Juan Vargas
52nd	56%	44%	Scott Peters
53rd	55%	45%	Susan Davis

==== By city ====
County	City	Dianne Feinstein (Dem)		Kevin De León (Dem)		Margin		Total
Alameda	Alameda	20,586	62.16	12,534	37.84	8,052	24.32	33,120
Alameda	Albany	5,234	61.38	3,293	38.62	1,941	22.76	8,527
Alameda	Berkeley	31,889	56.92	24,139	43.08	7,750	13.84	56,028
Alameda	Dublin	9,987	57.76	7,305	42.24	2,682	15.52	17,292
Alameda	Emeryville	2,743	60.09	1,822	39.91	921	20.18	4,565
Alameda	Fremont	35,638	59.74	24,019	40.26	11,619	19.48	59,657
Alameda	Hayward	21,446	58.3	15,341	41.7	6,105	16.6	36,787
Alameda	Livermore	16,802	52.35	15,291	47.65	1,511	4.7	32,093
Alameda	Newark	7,176	58.72	5,045	41.28	2,131	17.44	12,221
Alameda	Oakland	92,461	58.14	66,558	41.86	25,903	16.28	159,019
Alameda	Piedmont	4,708	71.54	1,873	28.46	2,835	43.08	6,581
Alameda	Pleasanton	16,310	57.56	12,028	42.44	4,282	15.12	28,338
Alameda	San Leandro	15,539	59.4	10,620	40.6	4,919	18.8	26,159
Alameda	Union City	11,804	60.2	7,803	39.8	4,001	20.4	19,607
Alameda	Unincorporated area of Alameda County	26,054	57.47	19,279	42.53	6,775	14.94	45,333
Alpine	Unincorporated area of Alpine County	267	48.81	280	51.19	-13	-2.38	547
Amador	Amador	44	44.9	54	55.1	-10	-10.2	98
Amador	Ione	574	37.66	950	62.34	-376	-24.68	1,524
Amador	Jackson	702	42.11	965	57.89	-263	-15.78	1,667
Amador	Plymouth	97	30.6	220	69.4	-123	-38.8	317
Amador	Sutter Creek	518	48.23	556	51.77	-38	-3.54	1,074
Amador	Unincorporated area of Amador County	3,900	41.49	5,499	58.51	-1,599	-17.02	9,399
Butte	Biggs	143	33.41	285	66.59	-142	-33.18	428
Butte	Chico	15,202	47.58	16,746	52.42	-1,544	-4.84	31,948
Butte	Gridley	565	36.48	984	63.52	-419	-27.04	1,549
Butte	Oroville	1,668	42.42	2,264	57.58	-596	-15.16	3,932
Butte	Paradise	4,104	40.01	6,153	59.99	-2,049	-19.98	10,257
Butte	Unincorporated area of Butte County	10,736	39.17	16,676	60.83	-5,940	-21.66	27,412
Calaveras	Angels	565	39.26	874	60.74	-309	-21.48	1,439
Calaveras	Unincorporated area of Calaveras County	6,466	40.54	9,483	59.46	-3,017	-18.92	15,949
Colusa	Colusa	575	38.08	935	61.92	-360	-23.84	1,510
Colusa	Williams	233	32.72	479	67.28	-246	-34.56	712
Colusa	Unincorporated area of Colusa County	835	33.94	1,625	66.06	-790	-32.12	2,460
Contra Costa	Antioch	16,264	58.63	11,475	41.37	4,789	17.26	27,739
Contra Costa	Brentwood	10,058	51.18	9,595	48.82	463	2.36	19,653
Contra Costa	Clayton	2,876	54.15	2,435	45.85	441	8.3	5,311
Contra Costa	Concord	21,663	55.24	17,555	44.76	4,108	10.48	39,218
Contra Costa	Danville	11,140	56.71	8,505	43.29	2,635	13.42	19,645
Contra Costa	El Cerrito	7,699	62.96	4,529	37.04	3,170	25.92	12,228
Contra Costa	Hercules	5,602	65.34	2,971	34.66	2,631	30.68	8,573
Contra Costa	Lafayette	8,240	63.63	4,710	36.37	3,530	27.26	12,950
Contra Costa	Martinez	8,890	56.3	6,901	43.7	1,989	12.6	15,791
Contra Costa	Moraga	4,913	63.28	2,851	36.72	2,062	26.56	7,764
Contra Costa	Oakley	5,299	49.73	5,357	50.27	-58	-0.54	10,656
Contra Costa	Orinda	6,872	66.94	3,394	33.06	3,478	33.88	10,266
Contra Costa	Pinole	4,237	60.07	2,816	39.93	1,421	20.14	7,053
Contra Costa	Pittsburg	10,000	58.55	7,079	41.45	2,921	17.1	17,079
Contra Costa	Pleasant Hill	8,190	58.15	5,894	41.85	2,296	16.3	14,084
Contra Costa	Richmond	19,512	64.72	10,636	35.28	8,876	29.44	30,148
Contra Costa	San Pablo	3,237	59.98	2,160	40.02	1,077	19.96	5,397
Contra Costa	San Ramon	14,950	57.65	10,984	42.35	3,966	15.3	25,934
Contra Costa	Walnut Creek	19,244	60.53	12,548	39.47	6,696	21.06	31,792
Contra Costa	Unincorporated area of Contra Costa County	33,463	55.94	26,353	44.06	7,110	11.88	59,816
Del Norte	Crescent City	349	41.9	484	58.1	-135	-16.2	833
Del Norte	Unincorporated area of Del Norte County	2,241	37.28	3,770	62.72	-1,529	-25.44	6,011
El Dorado	Placerville	1,722	47.46	1,906	52.54	-184	-5.08	3,628
El Dorado	South Lake Tahoe	3,140	50.56	3,070	49.44	70	1.12	6,210
El Dorado	Unincorporated area of El Dorado County	28,910	46.09	33,815	53.91	-4,905	-7.82	62,725
Fresno	Clovis	14,445	43.63	18,665	56.37	-4,220	-12.74	33,110
Fresno	Coalinga	997	39.49	1,528	60.51	-531	-21.02	2,525
Fresno	Firebaugh	585	48.23	628	51.77	-43	-3.54	1,213
Fresno	Fowler	784	47.49	867	52.51	-83	-5.02	1,651
Fresno	Fresno	56,074	50.59	54,775	49.41	1,299	1.18	110,849
Fresno	Huron	190	40.43	280	59.57	-90	-19.14	470
Fresno	Kerman	1,167	43.61	1,509	56.39	-342	-12.78	2,676
Fresno	Kingsburg	1,306	39.1	2,034	60.9	-728	-21.8	3,340
Fresno	Mendota	588	53.55	510	46.45	78	7.1	1,098
Fresno	Orange Cove	744	61.74	461	38.26	283	23.48	1,205
Fresno	Parlier	1,020	51.62	956	48.38	64	3.24	1,976
Fresno	Reedley	2,115	45.17	2,567	54.83	-452	-9.66	4,682
Fresno	San Joaquin	185	45.23	224	54.77	-39	-9.54	409
Fresno	Sanger	2,666	49.58	2,711	50.42	-45	-0.84	5,377
Fresno	Selma	2,127	47.72	2,330	52.28	-203	-4.56	4,457
Fresno	Unincorporated area of Fresno County	18,498	44.03	23,512	55.97	-5,014	-11.94	42,010
Glenn	Orland	614	37.58	1,020	62.42	-406	-24.84	1,634
Glenn	Willows	484	35.56	877	64.44	-393	-28.88	1,361
Glenn	Unincorporated area of Glenn County	1,243	33.29	2,491	66.71	-1,248	-33.42	3,734
Humboldt	Arcata	3,665	48.93	3,826	51.07	-161	-2.14	7,491
Humboldt	Blue Lake	241	44.63	299	55.37	-58	-10.74	540
Humboldt	Eureka	4,075	46.72	4,648	53.28	-573	-6.56	8,723
Humboldt	Ferndale	277	42.62	373	57.38	-96	-14.76	650
Humboldt	Fortuna	1,271	37.34	2,133	62.66	-862	-25.32	3,404
Humboldt	Rio Dell	252	31.58	546	68.42	-294	-36.84	798
Humboldt	Trinidad	109	53.17	96	46.83	13	6.34	205
Humboldt	Unincorporated area of Humboldt County	11,446	44.29	14,398	55.71	-2,952	-11.42	25,844
Imperial	Brawley	2,046	44.77	2,524	55.23	-478	-10.46	4,570
Imperial	Calexico	3,207	46.04	3,759	53.96	-552	-7.92	6,966
Imperial	Calipatria	228	43.26	299	56.74	-71	-13.48	527
Imperial	El Centro	3,608	44.42	4,514	55.58	-906	-11.16	8,122
Imperial	Holtville	460	41.18	657	58.82	-197	-17.64	1,117
Imperial	Imperial	1,530	41.93	2,119	58.07	-589	-16.14	3,649
Imperial	Westmoreland	130	37.79	214	62.21	-84	-24.42	344
Imperial	Unincorporated area of Imperial County	1,912	38.42	3,064	61.58	-1,152	-23.16	4,976
Inyo	Bishop	469	43.39	612	56.61	-143	-13.22	1,081
Inyo	Unincorporated area of Inyo County	1,875	39.1	2,920	60.9	-1,045	-21.8	4,795
Kern	Arvin	817	44.43	1,022	55.57	-205	-11.14	1,839
Kern	Bakersfield	33,141	42.25	45,293	57.75	-12,152	-15.5	78,434
Kern	California City	1,056	39.42	1,623	60.58	-567	-21.16	2,679
Kern	Delano	2,906	48.95	3,031	51.05	-125	-2.1	5,937
Kern	Maricopa	45	24.32	140	75.68	-95	-51.36	185
Kern	McFarland	646	42.87	861	57.13	-215	-14.26	1,507
Kern	Ridgecrest	2,526	34.53	4,789	65.47	-2,263	-30.94	7,315
Kern	Shafter	1,055	38.57	1,680	61.43	-625	-22.86	2,735
Kern	Taft	448	33.53	888	66.47	-440	-32.94	1,336
Kern	Tehachapi	824	34.51	1,564	65.49	-740	-30.98	2,388
Kern	Wasco	1,104	41.29	1,570	58.71	-466	-17.42	2,674
Kern	Unincorporated area of Kern County	22,060	37.03	37,520	62.97	-15,460	-25.94	59,580
Kings	Avenal	336	38.23	543	61.77	-207	-23.54	879
Kings	Corcoran	868	46.82	986	53.18	-118	-6.36	1,854
Kings	Hanford	4,676	38.13	7,588	61.87	-2,912	-23.74	12,264
Kings	Lemoore	1,864	36.2	3,285	63.8	-1,421	-27.6	5,149
Kings	Unincorporated area of Kings County	1,855	35.67	3,346	64.33	-1,491	-28.66	5,201
Lake	Clearlake	1,378	47.45	1,526	52.55	-148	-5.1	2,904
Lake	Lakeport	724	44.28	911	55.72	-187	-11.44	1,635
Lake	Unincorporated area of Lake County	6,040	43.39	7,880	56.61	-1,840	-13.22	13,920
Lassen	Susanville	778	32.16	1,641	67.84	-863	-35.68	2,419
Lassen	Unincorporated area of Lassen County	1,364	28.64	3,399	71.36	-2,035	-42.72	4,763
Los Angeles	Agoura Hills	5,305	61.08	3,380	38.92	1,925	22.16	8,685
Los Angeles	Alhambra	11,706	58.3	8,372	41.7	3,334	16.6	20,078
Los Angeles	Arcadia	8,204	61.09	5,225	38.91	2,979	22.18	13,429
Los Angeles	Artesia	1,869	51.82	1,738	48.18	131	3.64	3,607
Los Angeles	Avalon	465	50.43	457	49.57	8	0.86	922
Los Angeles	Azusa	5,271	53.03	4,669	46.97	602	6.06	9,940
Los Angeles	Baldwin Park	7,046	50.56	6,891	49.44	155	1.12	13,937
Los Angeles	Bell	2,780	51.26	2,643	48.74	137	2.52	5,423
Los Angeles	Bell Gardens	2,931	45.08	3,571	54.92	-640	-9.84	6,502
Los Angeles	Bellflower	8,732	52.3	7,964	47.7	768	4.6	16,696
Los Angeles	Beverly Hills	7,822	66.88	3,873	33.12	3,949	33.76	11,695
Los Angeles	Bradbury	185	57.1	139	42.9	46	14.2	324
Los Angeles	Burbank	22,117	58.86	15,459	41.14	6,658	17.72	37,576
Los Angeles	Calabasas	6,286	66.28	3,198	33.72	3,088	32.56	9,484
Los Angeles	Carson	18,019	63.87	10,192	36.13	7,827	27.74	28,211
Los Angeles	Cerritos	9,510	58	6,886	42	2,624	16	16,396
Los Angeles	Claremont	8,233	59.17	5,680	40.83	2,553	18.34	13,913
Los Angeles	Commerce	1,594	50.35	1,572	49.65	22	0.7	3,166
Los Angeles	Compton	11,707	61.16	7,436	38.84	4,271	22.32	19,143
Los Angeles	Covina	6,817	50.88	6,580	49.12	237	1.76	13,397
Los Angeles	Cudahy	1,729	51.8	1,609	48.2	120	3.6	3,338
Los Angeles	Culver City	11,596	61.96	7,118	38.04	4,478	23.92	18,714
Los Angeles	Diamond Bar	9,156	58.34	6,538	41.66	2,618	16.68	15,694
Los Angeles	Downey	14,767	50.71	14,353	49.29	414	1.42	29,120
Los Angeles	Duarte	3,542	54.44	2,964	45.56	578	8.88	6,506
Los Angeles	El Monte	8,442	53.1	7,457	46.9	985	6.2	15,899
Los Angeles	El Segundo	4,087	55.32	3,301	44.68	786	10.64	7,388
Los Angeles	Gardena	10,563	64.94	5,702	35.06	4,861	29.88	16,265
Los Angeles	Glendale	28,276	58.03	20,450	41.97	7,826	16.06	48,726
Los Angeles	Glendora	8,527	50.74	8,279	49.26	248	1.48	16,806
Los Angeles	Hawaiian Gardens	1,218	51.26	1,158	48.74	60	2.52	2,376
Los Angeles	Hawthorne	11,899	59.95	7,948	40.05	3,951	19.9	19,847
Los Angeles	Hermosa Beach	5,465	62.65	3,258	37.35	2,207	25.3	8,723
Los Angeles	Hidden Hills	531	65.07	285	34.93	246	30.14	816
Los Angeles	Huntington Park	4,497	52.32	4,098	47.68	399	4.64	8,595
Los Angeles	Industry	1,036	49.31	1,065	50.69	-29	-1.38	2,101
Los Angeles	Inglewood	22,416	68.18	10,462	31.82	11,954	36.36	32,878
Los Angeles	Irwindale	203	46.14	237	53.86	-34	-7.72	440
Los Angeles	La Canada Flintridge	5,654	63.92	3,191	36.08	2,463	27.84	8,845
Los Angeles	La Habra Heights	1,310	56.1	1,025	43.9	285	12.2	2,335
Los Angeles	La Mirada	7,843	54.28	6,605	45.72	1,238	8.56	14,448
Los Angeles	La Puente	4,268	53.5	3,710	46.5	558	7	7,978
Los Angeles	La Verne	6,286	54.53	5,242	45.47	1,044	9.06	11,528
Los Angeles	Lakewood	15,123	55.7	12,029	44.3	3,094	11.4	27,152
Los Angeles	Lancaster	17,890	49.13	18,520	50.87	-630	-1.74	36,410
Los Angeles	Lawndale	3,776	53.77	3,247	46.23	529	7.54	7,023
Los Angeles	Lomita	3,313	54.33	2,785	45.67	528	8.66	6,098
Los Angeles	Long Beach	73,123	55.9	57,681	44.1	15,442	11.8	130,804
Los Angeles	Los Angeles	625,755	59.25	430,361	40.75	195,394	18.5	1,056,116
Los Angeles	Lynwood	6,399	53.63	5,532	46.37	867	7.26	11,931
Los Angeles	Malibu	3,340	63.23	1,942	36.77	1,398	26.46	5,282
Los Angeles	Manhattan Beach	10,648	65.26	5,669	34.74	4,979	30.52	16,317
Los Angeles	Maywood	2,446	52.99	2,170	47.01	276	5.98	4,616
Los Angeles	Monrovia	7,078	58.12	5,100	41.88	1,978	16.24	12,178
Los Angeles	Montebello	7,868	50.39	7,746	49.61	122	0.78	15,614
Los Angeles	Monterey Park	7,960	60.46	5,206	39.54	2,754	20.92	13,166
Los Angeles	Norwalk	12,158	52.69	10,917	47.31	1,241	5.38	23,075
Los Angeles	Palmdale	18,365	49.69	18,592	50.31	-227	-0.62	36,957
Los Angeles	Palos Verdes Estates	3,986	62.98	2,343	37.02	1,643	25.96	6,329
Los Angeles	Paramount	5,266	54.85	4,334	45.15	932	9.7	9,600
Los Angeles	Pasadena	31,399	62.5	18,840	37.5	12,559	25	50,239
Los Angeles	Pico Rivera	8,575	50.47	8,414	49.53	161	0.94	16,989
Los Angeles	Pomona	15,434	53.22	13,567	46.78	1,867	6.44	29,001
Los Angeles	Rancho Palos Verdes	10,170	61.24	6,437	38.76	3,733	22.48	16,607
Los Angeles	Redondo Beach	16,312	58.78	11,440	41.22	4,872	17.56	27,752
Los Angeles	Rolling Hills	533	65.4	282	34.6	251	30.8	815
Los Angeles	Rolling Hills Estates	2,174	62.51	1,304	37.49	870	25.02	3,478
Los Angeles	Rosemead	4,971	59.97	3,318	40.03	1,653	19.94	8,289
Los Angeles	San Dimas	6,163	53.58	5,339	46.42	824	7.16	11,502
Los Angeles	San Fernando	2,717	53.99	2,315	46.01	402	7.98	5,032
Los Angeles	San Gabriel	5,011	62.19	3,047	37.81	1,964	24.38	8,058
Los Angeles	San Marino	2,950	65.47	1,556	34.53	1,394	30.94	4,506
Los Angeles	Santa Clarita	36,224	50.89	34,956	49.11	1,268	1.78	71,180
Los Angeles	Santa Fe Springs	2,828	55.07	2,307	44.93	521	10.14	5,135
Los Angeles	Santa Monica	26,484	61.54	16,551	38.46	9,933	23.08	43,035
Los Angeles	Sierra Madre	3,301	64.2	1,841	35.8	1,460	28.4	5,142
Los Angeles	Signal Hill	1,956	56.19	1,525	43.81	431	12.38	3,481
Los Angeles	South El Monte	2,081	54.68	1,725	45.32	356	9.36	3,806
Los Angeles	South Gate	9,847	52.31	8,976	47.69	871	4.62	18,823
Los Angeles	South Pasadena	7,147	62.59	4,271	37.41	2,876	25.18	11,418
Los Angeles	Temple City	5,003	60.13	3,317	39.87	1,686	20.26	8,320
Los Angeles	Torrance	27,635	57.82	20,159	42.18	7,476	15.64	47,794
Los Angeles	Vernon	15	32.61	31	67.39	-16	-34.78	46
Los Angeles	Walnut	5,510	60	3,674	40	1,836	20	9,184
Los Angeles	West Covina	14,900	55.61	11,894	44.39	3,006	11.22	26,794
Los Angeles	West Hollywood	11,635	65.86	6,031	34.14	5,604	31.72	17,666
Los Angeles	Westlake Village	2,167	57.63	1,593	42.37	574	15.26	3,760
Los Angeles	Whittier	14,040	54.32	11,805	45.68	2,235	8.64	25,845
Los Angeles	Unincorporated area of Los Angeles County	143,581	55.88	113,375	44.12	30,206	11.76	256,956
Madera	Chowchilla	894	35.93	1,594	64.07	-700	-28.14	2,488
Madera	Madera	4,367	45.61	5,207	54.39	-840	-8.78	9,574
Madera	Unincorporated area of Madera County	8,023	39.61	12,231	60.39	-4,208	-20.78	20,254
Marin	Belvedere	753	68.58	345	31.42	408	37.16	1,098
Marin	Corte Madera	3,474	67.52	1,671	32.48	1,803	35.04	5,145
Marin	Fairfax	2,712	59.47	1,848	40.53	864	18.94	4,560
Marin	Larkspur	4,692	68.65	2,143	31.35	2,549	37.3	6,835
Marin	Mill Valley	5,842	71.15	2,369	28.85	3,473	42.3	8,211
Marin	Novato	13,978	62	8,568	38	5,410	24	22,546
Marin	Ross	838	68.8	380	31.2	458	37.6	1,218
Marin	San Anselmo	4,686	65.27	2,493	34.73	2,193	30.54	7,179
Marin	San Rafael	15,141	64.57	8,309	35.43	6,832	29.14	23,450
Marin	Sausalito	2,860	67.66	1,367	32.34	1,493	35.32	4,227
Marin	Tiburon	3,166	67.98	1,491	32.02	1,675	35.96	4,657
Marin	Unincorporated area of Marin County	22,177	65.55	11,654	34.45	10,523	31.1	33,831
Mariposa	Unincorporated area of Mariposa County	2,749	41.1	3,939	58.9	-1,190	-17.8	6,688
Mendocino	Fort Bragg	1,234	53.56	1,070	46.44	164	7.12	2,304
Mendocino	Point Arena	90	51.43	85	48.57	5	2.86	175
Mendocino	Ukiah	2,178	46.72	2,484	53.28	-306	-6.56	4,662
Mendocino	Willits	662	44.22	835	55.78	-173	-11.56	1,497
Mendocino	Unincorporated area of Mendocino County	10,949	49.76	11,055	50.24	-106	-0.48	22,004
Merced	Atwater	2,589	42.11	3,559	57.89	-970	-15.78	6,148
Merced	Dos Palos	452	44.49	564	55.51	-112	-11.02	1,016
Merced	Gustine	491	43.61	635	56.39	-144	-12.78	1,126
Merced	Livingston	1,323	51	1,271	49	52	2	2,594
Merced	Los Banos	3,784	49.79	3,816	50.21	-32	-0.42	7,600
Merced	Merced	8,076	48.87	8,450	51.13	-374	-2.26	16,526
Merced	Unincorporated area of Merced County	6,944	41.75	9,690	58.25	-2,746	-16.5	16,634
Modoc	Alturas	221	31.84	473	68.16	-252	-36.32	694
Modoc	Unincorporated area of Modoc County	530	27.55	1,394	72.45	-864	-44.9	1,924
Mono	Mammoth Lakes	1,098	51.96	1,015	48.04	83	3.92	2,113
Mono	Unincorporated area of Mono County	903	43.31	1,182	56.69	-279	-13.38	2,085
Monterey	Carmel-by-the-Sea	1,173	62.36	708	37.64	465	24.72	1,881
Monterey	Del Rey Oaks	441	55.89	348	44.11	93	11.78	789
Monterey	Gonzales	756	48.25	811	51.75	-55	-3.5	1,567
Monterey	Greenfield	1,213	49.73	1,226	50.27	-13	-0.54	2,439
Monterey	King City	648	43.84	830	56.16	-182	-12.32	1,478
Monterey	Marina	3,374	54.84	2,778	45.16	596	9.68	6,152
Monterey	Monterey	5,637	55.82	4,461	44.18	1,176	11.64	10,098
Monterey	Pacific Grove	4,308	59.23	2,965	40.77	1,343	18.46	7,273
Monterey	Salinas	14,576	50.35	14,376	49.65	200	0.7	28,952
Monterey	Sand City	53	42.74	71	57.26	-18	-14.52	124
Monterey	Seaside	4,159	55.63	3,317	44.37	842	11.26	7,476
Monterey	Soledad	1,414	47.1	1,588	52.9	-174	-5.8	3,002
Monterey	Unincorporated area of Monterey County	18,568	52.08	17,083	47.92	1,485	4.16	35,651
Napa	American Canyon	3,553	55.59	2,839	44.41	714	11.18	6,392
Napa	Calistoga	1,005	58.63	709	41.37	296	17.26	1,714
Napa	Napa	15,558	53.94	13,286	46.06	2,272	7.88	28,844
Napa	St. Helena	1,559	62.29	944	37.71	615	24.58	2,503
Napa	Yountville	804	58.64	567	41.36	237	17.28	1,371
Napa	Unincorporated area of Napa County	5,425	52.31	4,945	47.69	480	4.62	10,370
Nevada	Grass Valley	2,330	48.28	2,496	51.72	-166	-3.44	4,826
Nevada	Nevada City	2,717	52.74	2,435	47.26	282	5.48	5,152
Nevada	Truckee	3,980	56.58	3,054	43.42	926	13.16	7,034
Nevada	Unincorporated area of Nevada County	15,888	46.39	18,361	53.61	-2,473	-7.22	34,249
Orange	Aliso Viejo	9,675	56.64	7,406	43.36	2,269	13.28	17,081
Orange	Anaheim	40,339	52.45	36,564	47.55	3,775	4.9	76,903
Orange	Brea	8,293	55.09	6,760	44.91	1,533	10.18	15,053
Orange	Buena Park	10,582	54.09	8,983	45.91	1,599	8.18	19,565
Orange	Costa Mesa	17,588	52.47	15,930	47.53	1,658	4.94	33,518
Orange	Cypress	8,509	56.75	6,484	43.25	2,025	13.5	14,993
Orange	Dana Point	7,504	56.41	5,798	43.59	1,706	12.82	13,302
Orange	Fountain Valley	10,655	53.65	9,206	46.35	1,449	7.3	19,861
Orange	Fullerton	22,516	55.85	17,796	44.15	4,720	11.7	40,312
Orange	Garden Grove	20,645	53.46	17,975	46.54	2,670	6.92	38,620
Orange	Huntington Beach	39,139	53.59	33,897	46.41	5,242	7.18	73,036
Orange	Irvine	43,372	56.16	33,863	43.84	9,509	12.32	77,235
Orange	La Habra	8,441	52.13	7,750	47.87	691	4.26	16,191
Orange	La Palma	2,891	59.33	1,982	40.67	909	18.66	4,873
Orange	Laguna Beach	7,337	62.38	4,425	37.62	2,912	24.76	11,762
Orange	Laguna Hills	6,048	54.87	4,974	45.13	1,074	9.74	11,022
Orange	Laguna Niguel	14,600	57.83	10,645	42.17	3,955	15.66	25,245
Orange	Laguna Woods	5,159	53.83	4,425	46.17	734	7.66	9,584
Orange	Lake Forest	14,241	51.73	13,289	48.27	952	3.46	27,530
Orange	Los Alamitos	2,020	53.07	1,786	46.93	234	6.14	3,806
Orange	Mission Viejo	20,392	55.46	16,379	44.54	4,013	10.92	36,771
Orange	Newport Beach	19,665	56.66	15,044	43.34	4,621	13.32	34,709
Orange	Orange	20,817	51.26	19,794	48.74	1,023	2.52	40,611
Orange	Placentia	8,572	52.97	7,610	47.03	962	5.94	16,182
Orange	Rancho Santa Margarita	9,079	54.87	7,466	45.13	1,613	9.74	16,545
Orange	San Clemente	13,209	54.82	10,885	45.18	2,324	9.64	24,094
Orange	San Juan Capistrano	6,649	54.72	5,501	45.28	1,148	9.44	12,150
Orange	Santa Ana	29,814	52.99	26,452	47.01	3,362	5.98	56,266
Orange	Seal Beach	6,724	56.88	5,097	43.12	1,627	13.76	11,821
Orange	Stanton	4,104	56.07	3,215	43.93	889	12.14	7,319
Orange	Tustin	11,025	52.53	9,965	47.47	1,060	5.06	20,990
Orange	Villa Park	1,442	53.71	1,243	46.29	199	7.42	2,685
Orange	Westminster	12,585	54.99	10,299	45.01	2,286	9.98	22,884
Orange	Yorba Linda	13,705	54.25	11,557	45.75	2,148	8.5	25,262
Orange	Unincorporated area of Orange County	24,342	54.44	20,369	45.56	3,973	8.88	44,711
Placer	Auburn	2,881	48.65	3,041	51.35	-160	-2.7	5,922
Placer	Colfax	263	45.66	313	54.34	-50	-8.68	576
Placer	Lincoln	8,328	45.49	9,980	54.51	-1,652	-9.02	18,308
Placer	Loomis	1,127	44.16	1,425	55.84	-298	-11.68	2,552
Placer	Rocklin	10,409	45.89	12,275	54.11	-1,866	-8.22	22,684
Placer	Roseville	22,359	46.64	25,581	53.36	-3,222	-6.72	47,940
Placer	Unincorporated area of Placer County	21,211	46.79	24,118	53.21	-2,907	-6.42	45,329
Plumas	Portola	227	39.89	342	60.11	-115	-20.22	569
Plumas	Unincorporated area of Plumas County	2,588	38.78	4,086	61.22	-1,498	-22.44	6,674
Riverside	Banning	3,395	45.15	4,125	54.85	-730	-9.7	7,520
Riverside	Beaumont	5,610	45.83	6,632	54.17	-1,022	-8.34	12,242
Riverside	Blythe	847	39.8	1,281	60.2	-434	-20.4	2,128
Riverside	Calimesa	1,177	42.07	1,621	57.93	-444	-15.86	2,798
Riverside	Canyon Lake	1,588	42.62	2,138	57.38	-550	-14.76	3,726
Riverside	Cathedral City	6,597	53.99	5,623	46.01	974	7.98	12,220
Riverside	Coachella	2,428	46.94	2,745	53.06	-317	-6.12	5,173
Riverside	Corona	18,291	47.52	20,198	52.48	-1,907	-4.96	38,489
Riverside	Desert Hot Springs	2,446	49.55	2,490	50.45	-44	-0.9	4,936
Riverside	Eastvale	7,526	50.54	7,365	49.46	161	1.08	14,891
Riverside	Hemet	8,231	44.27	10,363	55.73	-2,132	-11.46	18,594
Riverside	Indian Wells	798	43.7	1,028	56.3	-230	-12.6	1,826
Riverside	Indio	8,421	45.18	10,219	54.82	-1,798	-9.64	18,640
Riverside	Jurupa Valley	9,068	45.72	10,765	54.28	-1,697	-8.56	19,833
Riverside	La Quinta	5,570	46.34	6,450	53.66	-880	-7.32	12,020
Riverside	Lake Elsinore	6,466	49.97	6,474	50.03	-8	-0.06	12,940
Riverside	Menifee	11,963	46.98	13,499	53.02	-1,536	-6.04	25,462
Riverside	Moreno Valley	21,623	55.98	17,003	44.02	4,620	11.96	38,626
Riverside	Murrieta	13,689	49.01	14,243	50.99	-554	-1.98	27,932
Riverside	Norco	3,041	43.06	4,022	56.94	-981	-13.88	7,063
Riverside	Palm Desert	8,162	48.63	8,622	51.37	-460	-2.74	16,784
Riverside	Palm Springs	11,423	62.14	6,961	37.86	4,462	24.28	18,384
Riverside	Perris	5,907	52.47	5,351	47.53	556	4.94	11,258
Riverside	Rancho Mirage	3,847	53.87	3,294	46.13	553	7.74	7,141
Riverside	Riverside	37,939	51.6	35,582	48.4	2,357	3.2	73,521
Riverside	San Jacinto	3,873	45.94	4,558	54.06	-685	-8.12	8,431
Riverside	Temecula	14,514	49.29	14,935	50.71	-421	-1.42	29,449
Riverside	Wildomar	3,835	44.95	4,696	55.05	-861	-10.1	8,531
Riverside	Unincorporated area of Riverside County	41,292	47.24	46,126	52.76	-4,834	-5.52	87,418
Sacramento	Citrus Heights	11,244	44.51	14,016	55.49	-2,772	-10.98	25,260
Sacramento	Elk Grove	29,814	54.54	24,850	45.46	4,964	9.08	54,664
Sacramento	Folsom	13,009	49.18	13,444	50.82	-435	-1.64	26,453
Sacramento	Galt	2,608	38.86	4,104	61.14	-1,496	-22.28	6,712
Sacramento	Isleton	105	47.73	115	52.27	-10	-4.54	220
Sacramento	Rancho Cordova	9,480	48.01	10,265	51.99	-785	-3.98	19,745
Sacramento	Sacramento	88,650	58.68	62,419	41.32	26,231	17.36	151,069
Sacramento	Unincorporated area of Sacramento County	86,661	50.56	84,736	49.44	1,925	1.12	171,397
San Benito	Hollister	5,220	49.86	5,249	50.14	-29	-0.28	10,469
San Benito	San Juan Bautista	365	57.12	274	42.88	91	14.24	639
San Benito	Unincorporated area of San Benito County	3,022	43.99	3,848	56.01	-826	-12.02	6,870
San Bernardino	Adelanto	2,291	52.28	2,091	47.72	200	4.56	4,382
San Bernardino	Apple Valley	8,136	43.94	10,381	56.06	-2,245	-12.12	18,517
San Bernardino	Barstow	1,775	44.9	2,178	55.1	-403	-10.2	3,953
San Bernardino	Big Bear Lake	698	46.23	812	53.77	-114	-7.54	1,510
San Bernardino	Chino	10,386	51.55	9,763	48.45	623	3.1	20,149
San Bernardino	Chino Hills	13,219	57.64	9,715	42.36	3,504	15.28	22,934
San Bernardino	Colton	5,205	53.35	4,552	46.65	653	6.7	9,757
San Bernardino	Fontana	22,019	54.98	18,027	45.02	3,992	9.96	40,046
San Bernardino	Grand Terrace	1,877	50.74	1,822	49.26	55	1.48	3,699
San Bernardino	Hesperia	7,828	43.63	10,115	56.37	-2,287	-12.74	17,943
San Bernardino	Highland	6,242	49.51	6,366	50.49	-124	-0.98	12,608
San Bernardino	Loma Linda	2,869	49.99	2,870	50.01	-1	-0.02	5,739
San Bernardino	Montclair	3,704	50.59	3,617	49.41	87	1.18	7,321
San Bernardino	Needles	369	40.55	541	59.45	-172	-18.9	910
San Bernardino	Ontario	16,603	49.97	16,624	50.03	-21	-0.06	33,227
San Bernardino	Rancho Cucamonga	24,478	49.26	25,211	50.74	-733	-1.48	49,689
San Bernardino	Redlands	11,761	50.38	11,582	49.62	179	0.76	23,343
San Bernardino	Rialto	10,955	56.45	8,450	43.55	2,505	12.9	19,405
San Bernardino	San Bernardino	18,408	50.7	17,900	49.3	508	1.4	36,308
San Bernardino	Twenty-nine Palms	1,234	40.89	1,784	59.11	-550	-18.22	3,018
San Bernardino	Upland	12,093	52.97	10,738	47.03	1,355	5.94	22,831
San Bernardino	Victorville	10,827	51.28	10,288	48.72	539	2.56	21,115
San Bernardino	Yucaipa	6,737	44.51	8,400	55.49	-1,663	-10.98	15,137
San Bernardino	Yucca Valley	2,531	44.36	3,175	55.64	-644	-11.28	5,706
San Bernardino	Unincorporated area of San Bernardino County	30,858	45.91	36,358	54.09	-5,500	-8.18	67,216
San Diego	Carlsbad	25,994	54.22	21,948	45.78	4,046	8.44	47,942
San Diego	Chula Vista	36,209	50.79	35,087	49.21	1,122	1.58	71,296
San Diego	Coronado	3,504	53.37	3,061	46.63	443	6.74	6,565
San Diego	Del Mar	1,358	58.56	961	41.44	397	17.12	2,319
San Diego	El Cajon	10,908	51.21	10,391	48.79	517	2.42	21,299
San Diego	Encinitas	16,694	57.29	12,447	42.71	4,247	14.58	29,141
San Diego	Escondido	17,291	47.52	19,099	52.48	-1,808	-4.96	36,390
San Diego	Imperial Beach	2,996	48.52	3,179	51.48	-183	-2.96	6,175
San Diego	La Mesa	11,359	54.83	9,356	45.17	2,003	9.66	20,715
San Diego	Lemon Grove	3,958	52.73	3,548	47.27	410	5.46	7,506
San Diego	National City	5,790	49.88	5,817	50.12	-27	-0.24	11,607
San Diego	Oceanside	27,029	49.23	27,874	50.77	-845	-1.54	54,903
San Diego	Poway	9,206	51.35	8,721	48.65	485	2.7	17,927
San Diego	San Diego	244,434	55.84	193,267	44.16	51,167	11.68	437,701
San Diego	San Marcos	12,998	49.24	13,399	50.76	-401	-1.52	26,397
San Diego	Santee	8,904	47.43	9,867	52.57	-963	-5.14	18,771
San Diego	Solana Beach	3,563	57.51	2,632	42.49	931	15.02	6,195
San Diego	Vista	11,529	47.15	12,922	52.85	-1,393	-5.7	24,451
San Diego	Unincorporated area of San Diego County	72,904	49.3	74,988	50.7	-2,084	-1.4	147,892
San Francisco	San Francisco	226,167	64.23	125,954	35.77	100,213	28.46	352,121
San Joaquin	Escalon	807	34.84	1,509	65.16	-702	-30.32	2,316
San Joaquin	Lathrop	2,433	48.26	2,608	51.74	-175	-3.48	5,041
San Joaquin	Lodi	6,349	38.79	10,020	61.21	-3,671	-22.42	16,369
San Joaquin	Manteca	8,818	41.05	12,662	58.95	-3,844	-17.9	21,480
San Joaquin	Ripon	1,952	37.28	3,284	62.72	-1,332	-25.44	5,236
San Joaquin	Stockton	31,997	52.61	28,820	47.39	3,177	5.22	60,817
San Joaquin	Tracy	11,801	48.69	12,436	51.31	-635	-2.62	24,237
San Joaquin	Unincorporated area of San Joaquin County	14,931	41.54	21,012	58.46	-6,081	-16.92	35,943
San Luis Obispo	Arroyo Grande	3,864	48.59	4,088	51.41	-224	-2.82	7,952
San Luis Obispo	Atascadero	5,086	45.85	6,007	54.15	-921	-8.3	11,093
San Luis Obispo	El Paso de Robles	4,134	43.59	5,349	56.41	-1,215	-12.82	9,483
San Luis Obispo	Grover Beach	2,129	48.81	2,233	51.19	-104	-2.38	4,362
San Luis Obispo	Morro Bay	2,663	51.64	2,494	48.36	169	3.28	5,157
San Luis Obispo	Pismo Beach	2,035	51.29	1,933	48.71	102	2.58	3,968
San Luis Obispo	San Luis Obispo	10,983	55.9	8,663	44.1	2,320	11.8	19,646
San Luis Obispo	Unincorporated area of San Luis Obispo County	22,348	49	23,260	51	-912	-2	45,608
San Mateo	Atherton	2,191	65.29	1,165	34.71	1,026	30.58	3,356
San Mateo	Belmont	7,174	62.87	4,237	37.13	2,937	25.74	11,411
San Mateo	Brisbane	1,259	63.23	732	36.77	527	26.46	1,991
San Mateo	Burlingame	7,789	63.79	4,422	36.21	3,367	27.58	12,211
San Mateo	Colma	278	63.91	157	36.09	121	27.82	435
San Mateo	Daly City	17,179	66.88	8,509	33.12	8,670	33.76	25,688
San Mateo	East Palo Alto	3,273	59.33	2,244	40.67	1,029	18.66	5,517
San Mateo	Foster City	7,200	63.79	4,087	36.21	3,113	27.58	11,287
San Mateo	Half Moon Bay	3,207	59.72	2,163	40.28	1,044	19.44	5,370
San Mateo	Hillsborough	3,350	64.7	1,828	35.3	1,522	29.4	5,178
San Mateo	Menlo Park	9,171	65.79	4,768	34.21	4,403	31.58	13,939
San Mateo	Millbrae	5,160	62.73	3,066	37.27	2,094	25.46	8,226
San Mateo	Pacifica	10,542	61.06	6,724	38.94	3,818	22.12	17,266
San Mateo	Portola Valley	1,785	66.73	890	33.27	895	33.46	2,675
San Mateo	Redwood City	17,256	60.42	11,304	39.58	5,952	20.84	28,560
San Mateo	San Bruno	8,712	60.91	5,592	39.09	3,120	21.82	14,304
San Mateo	San Carlos	9,367	63.63	5,354	36.37	4,013	27.26	14,721
San Mateo	San Mateo	23,238	62.76	13,788	37.24	9,450	25.52	37,026
San Mateo	South San Francisco	12,537	63.71	7,142	36.29	5,395	27.42	19,679
San Mateo	Woodside	1,788	60.28	1,178	39.72	610	20.56	2,966
San Mateo	Unincorporated area of San Mateo County	16,223	62.37	9,786	37.63	6,437	24.74	26,009
Santa Barbara	Buellton	911	49.92	914	50.08	-3	-0.16	1,825
Santa Barbara	Carpinteria	2,899	60.02	1,931	39.98	968	20.04	4,830
Santa Barbara	Goleta	7,124	59.22	4,906	40.78	2,218	18.44	12,030
Santa Barbara	Guadalupe	607	48.72	639	51.28	-32	-2.56	1,246
Santa Barbara	Lompoc	4,415	47.11	4,957	52.89	-542	-5.78	9,372
Santa Barbara	Santa Barbara	22,313	62.92	13,147	37.08	9,166	25.84	35,460
Santa Barbara	Santa Maria	7,703	46.24	8,956	53.76	-1,253	-7.52	16,659
Santa Barbara	Solvang	1,228	51.25	1,168	48.75	60	2.5	2,396
Santa Barbara	Unincorporated area of Santa Barbara County	28,074	53.3	24,599	46.7	3,475	6.6	52,673
Santa Clara	Campbell	8,882	57.44	6,581	42.56	2,301	14.88	15,463
Santa Clara	Cupertino	12,716	63.56	7,289	36.44	5,427	27.12	20,005
Santa Clara	Gilroy	7,885	51.72	7,361	48.28	524	3.44	15,246
Santa Clara	Los Altos	10,056	65.33	5,336	34.67	4,720	30.66	15,392
Santa Clara	Los Altos Hills	2,651	61.25	1,677	38.75	974	22.5	4,328
Santa Clara	Los Gatos	8,462	60.29	5,574	39.71	2,888	20.58	14,036
Santa Clara	Milpitas	11,068	61.7	6,870	38.3	4,198	23.4	17,938
Santa Clara	Monte Sereno	1,038	57.96	753	42.04	285	15.92	1,791
Santa Clara	Morgan Hill	7,987	52.32	7,280	47.68	707	4.64	15,267
Santa Clara	Mountain View	16,269	61.4	10,227	38.6	6,042	22.8	26,496
Santa Clara	Palo Alto	20,026	67.48	9,653	32.52	10,373	34.96	29,679
Santa Clara	San Jose	165,441	59.59	112,175	40.41	53,266	19.18	277,616
Santa Clara	Santa Clara	19,180	58.52	13,595	41.48	5,585	17.04	32,775
Santa Clara	Saratoga	8,855	62.49	5,315	37.51	3,540	24.98	14,170
Santa Clara	Sunnyvale	23,915	58.92	16,671	41.08	7,244	17.84	40,586
Santa Clara	Unincorporated area of Santa Clara County	15,435	55.68	12,285	44.32	3,150	11.36	27,720
Santa Cruz	Capitola	2,800	59.93	1,872	40.07	928	19.86	4,672
Santa Cruz	Santa Cruz	16,620	57.34	12,365	42.66	4,255	14.68	28,985
Santa Cruz	Scotts Valley	3,150	56.73	2,403	43.27	747	13.46	5,553
Santa Cruz	Watsonville	5,397	51.54	5,074	48.46	323	3.08	10,471
Santa Cruz	Unincorporated area of Santa Cruz County	36,211	58.49	25,702	41.51	10,509	16.98	61,913
Shasta	Anderson	795	32.86	1,624	67.14	-829	-34.28	2,419
Shasta	Redding	10,344	37.03	17,593	62.97	-7,249	-25.94	27,937
Shasta	Shasta Lake	900	32.1	1,904	67.9	-1,004	-35.8	2,804
Shasta	Unincorporated area of Shasta County	7,358	32.75	15,106	67.25	-7,748	-34.5	22,464
Sierra	Loyalton	90	36	160	64	-70	-28	250
Sierra	Unincorporated area of Sierra County	416	39.1	648	60.9	-232	-21.8	1,064
Siskiyou	Dorris	37	23.72	119	76.28	-82	-52.56	156
Siskiyou	Dunsmuir	255	43.59	330	56.41	-75	-12.82	585
Siskiyou	Etna	93	41.52	131	58.48	-38	-16.96	224
Siskiyou	Fort Jones	88	44	112	56	-24	-12	200
Siskiyou	Montague	104	27.15	279	72.85	-175	-45.7	383
Siskiyou	Mt. Shasta	695	49.64	705	50.36	-10	-0.72	1,400
Siskiyou	Tulelake	23	23.96	73	76.04	-50	-52.08	96
Siskiyou	Weed	285	45.53	341	54.47	-56	-8.94	626
Siskiyou	Yreka	766	36.1	1,356	63.9	-590	-27.8	2,122
Siskiyou	Unincorporated area of Siskiyou County	3,426	38.45	5,484	61.55	-2,058	-23.1	8,910
Solano	Benicia	6,928	54.9	5,691	45.1	1,237	9.8	12,619
Solano	Dixon	2,367	41.22	3,376	58.78	-1,009	-17.56	5,743
Solano	Fairfield	16,382	53.47	14,253	46.53	2,129	6.94	30,635
Solano	Rio Vista	2,202	49.67	2,231	50.33	-29	-0.66	4,433
Solano	Suisun City	4,294	53.84	3,681	46.16	613	7.68	7,975
Solano	Vacaville	13,445	46.26	15,617	53.74	-2,172	-7.48	29,062
Solano	Vallejo	21,558	60.83	13,880	39.17	7,678	21.66	35,438
Solano	Unincorporated area of Solano County	2,998	44.25	3,777	55.75	-779	-11.5	6,775
Sonoma	Cloverdale	1,662	52.3	1,516	47.7	146	4.6	3,178
Sonoma	Cotati	1,731	56.33	1,342	43.67	389	12.66	3,073
Sonoma	Healdsburg	2,804	56.17	2,188	43.83	616	12.34	4,992
Sonoma	Petaluma	14,926	57.06	11,234	42.94	3,692	14.12	26,160
Sonoma	Rohnert Park	7,678	53.11	6,778	46.89	900	6.22	14,456
Sonoma	Santa Rosa	35,175	56.71	26,847	43.29	8,328	13.42	62,022
Sonoma	Sebastopol	2,408	58.28	1,724	41.72	684	16.56	4,132
Sonoma	Sonoma	3,219	60.06	2,141	39.94	1,078	20.12	5,360
Sonoma	Windsor	5,382	52.14	4,940	47.86	442	4.28	10,322
Sonoma	Unincorporated area of Sonoma County	33,487	55.81	26,510	44.19	6,977	11.62	59,997
Stanislaus	Ceres	4,551	43.32	5,954	56.68	-1,403	-13.36	10,505
Stanislaus	Hughson	778	38.12	1,263	61.88	-485	-23.76	2,041
Stanislaus	Modesto	25,775	45.68	30,656	54.32	-4,881	-8.64	56,431
Stanislaus	Newman	1,041	44.24	1,312	55.76	-271	-11.52	2,353
Stanislaus	Oakdale	2,278	35.92	4,063	64.08	-1,785	-28.16	6,341
Stanislaus	Patterson	2,484	48.14	2,676	51.86	-192	-3.72	5,160
Stanislaus	Riverbank	2,244	38.54	3,579	61.46	-1,335	-22.92	5,823
Stanislaus	Turlock	8,506	43.99	10,831	56.01	-2,325	-12.02	19,337
Stanislaus	Waterford	641	33.28	1,285	66.72	-644	-33.44	1,926
Stanislaus	Unincorporated area of Stanislaus County	10,077	38.49	16,105	61.51	-6,028	-23.02	26,182
Sutter	Live Oak	779	43.84	998	56.16	-219	-12.32	1,777
Sutter	Yuba City	7,268	44.19	9,180	55.81	-1,912	-11.62	16,448
Sutter	Unincorporated area of Sutter County	2,454	38.09	3,988	61.91	-1,534	-23.82	6,442
Tehama	Corning	443	34.45	843	65.55	-400	-31.1	1,286
Tehama	Red Bluff	1,049	33.89	2,046	66.11	-997	-32.22	3,095
Tehama	Tehama	40	27.97	103	72.03	-63	-44.06	143
Tehama	Unincorporated area of Tehama County	3,903	32.09	8,261	67.91	-4,358	-35.82	12,164
Trinity	Unincorporated area of Trinity County	1,746	38.09	2,838	61.91	-1,092	-23.82	4,584
Tulare	Dinuba	1,501	44.67	1,859	55.33	-358	-10.66	3,360
Tulare	Exeter	786	34.73	1,477	65.27	-691	-30.54	2,263
Tulare	Farmersville	562	40.64	821	59.36	-259	-18.72	1,383
Tulare	Lindsay	590	40.83	855	59.17	-265	-18.34	1,445
Tulare	Porterville	3,405	39.28	5,264	60.72	-1,859	-21.44	8,669
Tulare	Tulare	4,579	39.42	7,037	60.58	-2,458	-21.16	11,616
Tulare	Visalia	12,792	40.5	18,793	59.5	-6,001	-19	31,585
Tulare	Woodlake	495	46.3	574	53.7	-79	-7.4	1,069
Tulare	Unincorporated area of Tulare County	8,295	38.8	13,085	61.2	-4,790	-22.4	21,380
Tuolumne	Sonora	871	43.48	1,132	56.52	-261	-13.04	2,003
Tuolumne	Unincorporated area of Tuolumne County	7,368	40.57	10,791	59.43	-3,423	-18.86	18,159
Ventura	Camarillo	12,732	49.78	12,845	50.22	-113	-0.44	25,577
Ventura	Fillmore	1,890	49.59	1,921	50.41	-31	-0.82	3,811
Ventura	Moorpark	6,362	49.7	6,438	50.3	-76	-0.6	12,800
Ventura	Ojai	1,934	55.85	1,529	44.15	405	11.7	3,463
Ventura	Oxnard	21,475	50.7	20,885	49.3	590	1.4	42,360
Ventura	Port Hueneme	2,580	48.78	2,709	51.22	-129	-2.44	5,289
Ventura	San Buenaventura	21,729	53.15	19,156	46.85	2,573	6.3	40,885
Ventura	Santa Paula	3,354	49.73	3,391	50.27	-37	-0.54	6,745
Ventura	Simi Valley	20,617	47.37	22,906	52.63	-2,289	-5.26	43,523
Ventura	Thousand Oaks	26,976	54.21	22,788	45.79	4,188	8.42	49,764
Ventura	Unincorporated area of Ventura County	17,492	52.97	15,533	47.03	1,959	5.94	33,025
Yolo	Davis	15,781	58.29	11,291	41.71	4,490	16.58	27,072
Yolo	West Sacramento	7,454	51.28	7,083	48.72	371	2.56	14,537
Yolo	Winters	917	42.87	1,222	57.13	-305	-14.26	2,139
Yolo	Woodland	7,594	44.81	9,353	55.19	-1,759	-10.38	16,947
Yolo	Unincorporated area of Yolo County	3,325	48	3,602	52	-277	-4	6,927
Yuba	Marysville	961	40.16	1,432	59.84	-471	-19.68	2,393
Yuba	Wheatland	263	38.01	429	61.99	-166	-23.98	692
Yuba	Unincorporated area of Yuba County	5,000	39.05	7,805	60.95	-2,805	-21.9	12,805
