= Jon Minadeo II =

American antisemite and neo-Nazi (born 1982)

Jon Minadeo
- Born: Jon Eugene Minadeo II; December 15, 1982 (age 43); Marin County, California, U.S.
- Other names: Handsome Truth (social media name); Shoobie Da Wop (rapper name)
- Occupation: Activist
- Years active: 2011–present
- Known for: Goyim Defense League

Jon Eugene Minadeo II (pronounced mih-NAH-dee-o) (born December 15, 1982), also known as Handsome Truth, is an American neo-Nazi, white supremacist, and antisemitic conspiracy theorist. He is the leader of the antisemitic hate group and conspiracy theory network Goyim Defense League (GDL). He is known for his video platform GoyimTV, banner drops, and his distribution of neo-Nazi propaganda.

== Personal life ==
Minadeo grew up in Northern California, where he lived with his mother in various apartments. He worked at his grandmother's restaurant, Dinucci’s Italian Dinners, in Valley Ford. Sources claim that there was a rupture in his family and that he has rarely held a steady job since leaving the restaurant. According to Jeff Renfro, who met Minadeo in 2013, he and Minadeo bonded while they were both recovering from substance use disorder. Later in 2016, Minadeo helped Renfro and his wife with renovations of their new studio. However during the COVID-19 pandemic, Renfro and Minadeo became distant, with Renfro saying that Minadeo would just sit in the parking lot and vape for hours. In a March 2022 interview with the Santa Rosa Press Democrat, Minadeo said he does some construction work and that he'd "probably have to leave Petaluma because things are growing so uncomfortable for him." In late December 2022, Minadeo and his girlfriend moved to Florida. In December 2024, Minadeo relocated to Arkansas.

Minadeo has three neo-Nazi tattoos: a Totenkopf on his arm, SS Bolts on his torso, and a Celtic cross on his left hand.

== Acting and rap stints ==
Minadeo produced two rap albums and one rap single in the early to mid 2010s under the rapper name Shoobie Da Wop. His first rap song was "Veni Vidi Vici" which was released in 2012 as a single. His first album was American Man Whore which was uploaded to the iTunes Store on 26 August 2013. His second album was Whore Moans which was uploaded to the iTunes Store on 12 March 2015. All of Minadeo's songs are hip-hop style raps about sexual escapades, alcohol abuse, and drug use. Prior to that, Minadeo also appeared in a few independent and short films such as Curveball (which he also co-wrote) and Vampire in 2011. In 2014, Minadeo portrayed the character Cliff Timberfalls in Reality TV Movie which was directed by Tytus Bergstrom.

== Antisemitic activities ==
=== Goyim Defense League ===
Minadeo is the leader of the Goyim Defense League white supremacist network and the owner-operator of the antisemitic online video platform GoyimTV. The name uses the term goyim, a Hebrew word for non-Jews. He has produced and distributed antisemitic flyers and instructs followers on how to spread antisemitic messages so that they can't be accused of targeting. He is also known for being affiliated with other white supremacists such as GypsyCrusader and Robert Wilson (also known as "Aryan Bacon").

Minadeo uses the social media moniker "Handsome Truth" and wears a chain with a swastika. In 2019, he filed a fictitious business name statement in California to operate business under the name "Handsome Truth Enterprises".

=== Banners and flyers ===
In August 2020, Minadeo did a banner drop over a Los Angeles highway that read "Honk if you know the Jews want a race war." In 2022, he shared online a photograph of himself holding a sign reading "Greenblatt suck 6 million dicks", referring to Jonathan Greenblatt of the Anti-Defamation League.

In October 2022, he hung a banner above a Los Angeles highway that read "KANYE IS RIGHT ABOUT THE JEWS", referring to Kanye West's antisemitism, prompting criticism from California Governor Gavin Newsom.

On January 28, 2023, Minadeo and three others were cited for littering in Palm Beach, Florida for distributing their flyers to private residences. Law enforcement have said Minadeo's hate speech is protected under the First Amendment to the United States Constitution so there is not much they can do to stop his practices.

In February 2023, Vice reported that Minadeo hung signs reading "Henry Ford was right about the Jews" and projected the text "Hitler was right" onto the Daytona International Speedway.

=== Jewish congregation ===
In late February 2023, Minadeo, holding a microphone, was captured flashing Hitler salutes and shouting antisemitic language at people leaving a Chabad congregation in South Orlando, including yelling "Heil Hitler" and telling people to "go back to Israel" and asking one person, "Sir, do you think you should be put in an oven?" The congregation's Rabbi, Yosef Konikov, said of the group, "What they're accomplishing is actually the opposite of what they think they’re accomplishing." and that, "It only strengthens us, strengthens the Jewish resolve, and the Jewish people around the world get more support from the goyim. So if they're listening: Thanks."

=== Arrests ===
In September 2022, Minadeo was arrested in Poland under hate speech laws after he and Robert Wilson demonstrated in front of the Auschwitz-Birkenau concentration camp; his swastika necklace and computer were confiscated. While in Poland, Minadeo filmed himself accosting a South Asian tourist on the sidewalk for four minutes, using racial stereotypes, accusing him of invading Europe, and telling him to return to India. Minadeo was arrested on June 26, 2023 for disorderly conduct and public disturbance at Temple Beth Israel in downtown Macon, Georgia during an antisemitic protest he organized. In November 2023, Minadeo was sentenced to 30 days in jail after being convicted of throwing antisemitic pamphlets from his truck. He was tried on a charge of littering, which carried a maximum sentence of 30 days. Later that month, Minadeo was set to be tried again for another incidence of littering, but the charges were dropped after video evidence showed that it was done by someone else.

=== Lawsuit ===
In June 2025, Minadeo was sued by Deago Buck for an assault that took place in Nashville in July 2024. Buck was reportedly beaten, had his eyes gouged, and was struck by the pole of a swastika flag while members of the Goyim Defense League livestreamed the incident as it unfolded. A case management conference for the lawsuit was scheduled for 15 December 2025. On 1 June 2026, Minadeo attempted to have the case dismissed but was overruled by a federal judge. As of 3 September 2026 the case is still ongoing.

=== Omegle ===
Minadeo regularly runs shock-jock live-streams on GoyimTV where he baits young people on the live online video chat website Omegle and shouts racist insults at them. Minadeo also reads comments of viewers who donate, raising hundreds of dollars during streams.

=== Other livestreams ===
After the termination of Omegle in 2023, Minadeo streamed using other video chatting and livestreaming websites such as his own which was titled "GoyimTV" and was active between 2020 and 2025 and chat spaces on Twitter. In these livestreams, Minadeo told children as young as 10 years old to prepare for a "race war" in America. In a chat space on Twitter in 2025, Minadeo described Eastern Europeans and Slavs as being genetically inferior to him.

== Filmography ==
Year	Movie	Role
2011	Curveball	James, co-screenwriter
2011	Vampire	Jon
2014	Reality TV Movie	Cliff Timberfalls

== Discography ==
Year	Song	Album
2012	"Veni Vidi Vici"	N/A
2013	"My Name Is Shoobie"	American Man Whore
2013	"Bay-Zerk"	American Man Whore
2013	"Coconut Shrimp"	American Man Whore
2013	"College Girls"	American Man Whore
2013	"Average Joe"	American Man Whore
2013	"Smd"	American Man Whore
2015	"BackStage"	Whore Moans
2015	"Pocket Full of Dope (feat. Professor Sex)"	Whore Moans
2015	"Mobbin' & Mashin"	Whore Moans
2015	"Blah, Blah, Blah!"	Whore Moans
2015	"Swagu Sauce"	Whore Moans
2015	"Make Them Moan (feat. Holla)"	Whore Moans

== See also ==
- Christopher Wood (activist)
