= Christopher Wood (activist) =

American white supremacist

Christopher Wood is an American activist and fringe candidate known for his antisemitism. In 2022, he ran for the office of board supervisor at Marathon County, Wisconsin, but lost the election. He also ran for mayor of Wausau, Wisconsin in 2024.

== Career ==
In August 2021, Wood opposed a pro-diversity resolution proposed at Marathon County's board of supervisors. He stated during a board meeting that freedom of speech was under attack and, in response to a local resident who said that her 13-year-old son was called a "fag", said that being called a fag is a common occurrence and that "we've got to get over it". The resolution eventually failed to receive a majority vote at the board of supervisors and was rejected.

In 2022, Wood ran against Michelle Van Krey for the office of county supervisor for the first district of Marathon County. He told Wausau's City News that he was called to run by "the heavenly father" and that he had a plan to build society from the ground up. Wood ultimately lost the election to Van Krey, who received 68% of the votes.

On June 13, 2023, Wood spoke at a Sacramento, California, city council meeting. During his speech, he encouraged the council to "start calling out the people who corrupt our country, and unfortunately it’s the Jews, who control the media, control the banks, control the government." Furthermore, he stated that White californians should move to whiter locations and leave the state for "the Blacks and Mexicans". Four days later, Wood led a white supremacist protest outside a LGBT pride event in Hudson, Wisconsin. During the protest, he chanted "pedophiles get the rope", "white lives matter" and "groom our dogs not kids".

In September of the same year, Wood accused multiple Jews who had dual citizenship with Israel of creating a COVID-19 "scam" during a board meeting at Marathon County's Health and Human Services Committee. During his speech, he named 16 Jewish individuals who are also in dual citizenship with Israel in the United States government or pharmaceutical industry, citing that they were influential to the shutdown during the decision of COVID epidemic. Wood's speech was met with both support and opposition among the audience, with some attendees raising their arms and giving him thumbs up and others admonishing him.

Wood said that he planned to run for mayor of Wausau, Wisconsin, in 2024. After losing the election with less than 5% of the vote, he was arrested in August 2024 and charged with hate crimes after an incident at a local gas station.

== See also ==
- Jon Minadeo
