= Patrick Little (neo-Nazi) =

American neo-Nazi activist (born 1984)

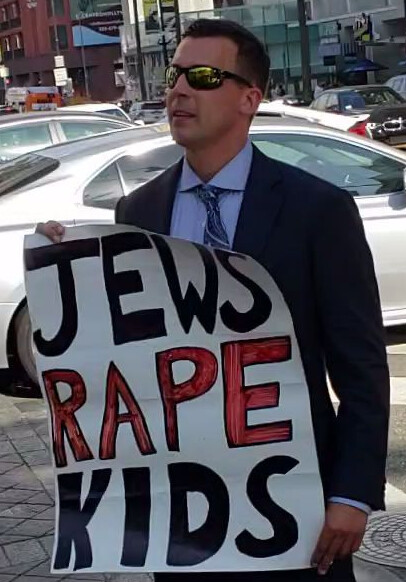
- Little holding a sign that reads "Jews Rape Kids" in Beverly Hills, 2018
- Born: 1984 (age 41–42); Maine, United States
- Occupations: Neo-Nazi activist, politician
- Known for: 2018 United States Senate election in California
- Political party: Republican
- Website: littlerevolution.us

Patrick Little (born 1984) is an American neo-Nazi, white supremacist, and U.S. Marine Corps veteran, best known for his bid for the Republican nomination in the 2018 United States Senate election in California.

== Early life ==
Little was born in 1984 in Maine and is a veteran of the U.S. Marine Corps. Before his entry into politics he worked as an IT engineer. Little stated he used to be a pro-Israeli Libertarian and supporter of the Tea Party movement until shortly after leaving the Marines in 2015 when he became an active contributor to WeSearchr chatrooms. There he was recommended The Culture of Critique, a trilogy of books by Kevin MacDonald which claim that evolutionary psychology provides the motivations behind Jewish group behavior and culture. Little participated in the Unite the Right rally in Charlottesville, Virginia.

== Political campaigns ==
=== 2018 Senate election in California ===
Little is most known for polling at 18% in a SurveyUSA poll for the 2018 United States Senate election in California which made him the top Republican in the race. This made him the second most popular candidate in the election, and would've garnered him a run-off against incumbent Dianne Feinstein; however, shortly after the poll was released, Little became the subject of intense media scrutiny. Matt Barreto, a professor of political sciences at University of California, Los Angeles, stated that most voters were unaware of Little's positions, and simply picked him in the polls due to being associated with the Republican Party, as the race quickly turned into a competition between two Democrats; Feinstein and Kevin de León. Even fellow Neo-Nazi Christopher Cantwell stated that it was unlikely that the poll results would transition to electoral success for Little. The election had a notably poor showing for the Republicans, who failed to stand any serious challenger to Feinstein. Shortly after significant media attention was turned to Little and his Neo-Nazi beliefs, he dropped to 0% in the next poll, with nobody who was asked saying they'd vote for him. His official campaign slogan was "Liberate the U.S. from the Jewish Oligarchy" and he would be endorsed by David Duke.

Little attempted to attend the California Republican Party's 2018 convention in San Diego; however, the party's executive, Cynthia Bryant, ordered his removal and barred him from any future California Republican event, to which he tweeted that "the Republican Party of California is nothing but Zionist stooges." A video of Little being dragged out of the convention, kicking and spitting on an Israeli flag went viral. Republican consultant Luis Alvarado stated that Little did not reflect Republican values and Matt Fleming, the official spokesmen for the California GOP, sought to remove any and all affiliation between Little and the Republican party stating that "Mr. Little has never been an active member of our party." During the campaign Little would partner with the Goyim Defense League for a "name the Jew" tour where he toured the United States with placards bearing antisemitic phrases such as; "Jews Rape Kids", "Jews Killed 30 Million", "The Holocaust is a Lie" and at one point flying a blimp over San Francisco with a text "Jews Rape Kids" and attempted to fly it near Oracle Park stadium during the Jewish Heritage Night with the San Francisco Giants event but failed due to poor weather conditions.

Little would place 12th of 35, earning 89,867 votes or 1.35% of the electorate. Little would go on to claim that the vote was rigged against him.

=== Garden City Council ===
In 2018 Little moved to Idaho and started a campaign for a seat on the Garden City Council in 2019. Ada County Republican chairman Ryan Davidson issued a no comment on Little and his positions, but highlighted that the Garden City Council is non-partisan and therefore Little can't run as a Republican. However, Garden City Mayor John Evans denounced Little as "baloney" and that his platform has no place in Garden City. He would also be denounced by the Rabbi of Boise; Dan Fink, who called Little and his behavior "very, very ugly." His campaign ran robo-calls saying "America has a Jewish problem" over an instrumental version of "I'll Be There For You," across northern Idaho. Little said he planned to make Sandpoint a "regional capital" in the fight against leftists and Jews. Little would lose the election, earning just 126 votes or 3.6% of the electorate.

=== 2020 presidential campaign ===
Little launched a write-in campaign for the Republican Nomination during the 2020 United States presidential election describing himself as a "Nationally Social Democratic American Patriot Republican." (Note: Or "NSDAP Republican", with NSDAP also being the abbreviation of the Nazi party)

== Views ==
Little has denied the Holocaust, referring to it as a "Jewish war atrocity propaganda hoax that never happened," and stated if he is elected he would make it illegal to raise money for Holocaust education.

Little has gone on record saying Adolf Hitler was the second coming of Christ.

One of his policy goals was to make an amendment to the United States Constitution to make it illegal for people of the Jewish faith to run for public office in the United States as well as additional legislation to mandate the death penalty to all politicians that voted in favor of foreign aid to Israel.

Little has called the United States an "ethnically European nation." He also routinely claims that the United States is a "Zionist-occupied government" that will "do whatever the hell Israel wants."

Little stated that if he was elected Senator he would have moved to make all federal benefits merit based.

Little also stated that he supports nationalizing big tech companies, such as Google, Facebook and Twitter.

Little claims that the "top priority" of the Jewish people is to displace white people specifically, and that he believes Jews control the media, the entertainment industry and politics, and that "anti-Semitism is caused by Jewish behavior."

Little called the neo-Nazi website the Daily Stormer "too Jewish." He is also an outspoken supporter of Christopher Cantwell.

Little stated he is opposed to the idea of turning the whole of the United States into a white Ethnostate as proposed by Richard B. Spencer, rather arguing that the United States should be Balkanized.

Little voiced support for Robert Bowers, the perpetrator of the Pittsburgh synagogue shooting, on Gab.

== Personal life ==
Little is married.
