= Goyim Defense League =

American Neo-Nazi group

- Formation: c. 2010s
- Founder: Jon Minadeo II
- Type: Antisemitism; Neo-Nazism; White supremacy; Homophobia
- Key people: Patrick Little; Jon Minadeo II

The Goyim Defense League (GDL) is a loosely organized American far-right, neo-Nazi group founded by Jon Minadeo II who operate an online video platform called GoyimTV. The platform primarily hosts far-right opinionated content, fake news, and conspiracy theories. It is unclear when GDL was founded, but activity began to be observed around 2018. The group is defined by the Anti-Defamation League as an antisemitic hate group.

== Name ==
"Goyim" is a Hebrew plural form of the word "goy" which means nation, and was historically used to refer to non-Jews. The name "Goyim Defense League" is a play on two Jewish organizations — the Jewish Defense League, and the Anti-Defamation League (ADL). GDL's logo is a parody of ADL's. It is also a reference to the flag of Nazi Germany.

== Description ==
BuzzFeed News described the GDL as a white supremacist group. The Goyim Defense League was listed by the Middle East Media Research Institute in a March 2019 Special Report as a group engaged in "Online Incitement against Jews."

== GoyimTV ==
Logo of GoyimTV

GDL operates an online video website called GoyimTV. Minadeo had launched the platform with the help of Dominic Di Giorgio of Port St. Lucie, Florida. It is used to share videos, live stream, and attract supporters to GDL.

GoyimTV has had a history of its transmissions being disrupted. In 2020, the platform was removed by its online provider after a flood of complaints. In late October 2022, the site was again taken down after a hold was placed on it by its domain provider, which Minadeo blamed on pressure from Jews. In November 2025, the site went offline again, this time due to pressure from NewsChannel 5's Phil Williams, who contacted the companies that hosted GoyimTV and gtvflyers.com, questioning them regarding their knowledge of the platforms' practices of targeting children to grow their user base and spread propaganda. As of January 2026, the sites have been brought back online under new domains.

== Activities ==
GDL's activity is reported to be primarily in the United States, mostly in California, Colorado, Florida, New York, and Texas.

=== Patrick Little's Twitter HQ protest ===
In December 2017, after getting suspended from Twitter, Patrick Little stood outside of Twitter headquarters in San Francisco, holding a sign that read "It's not okay to be white @Twitter."

=== Little's "Name the Jew" Tour ===
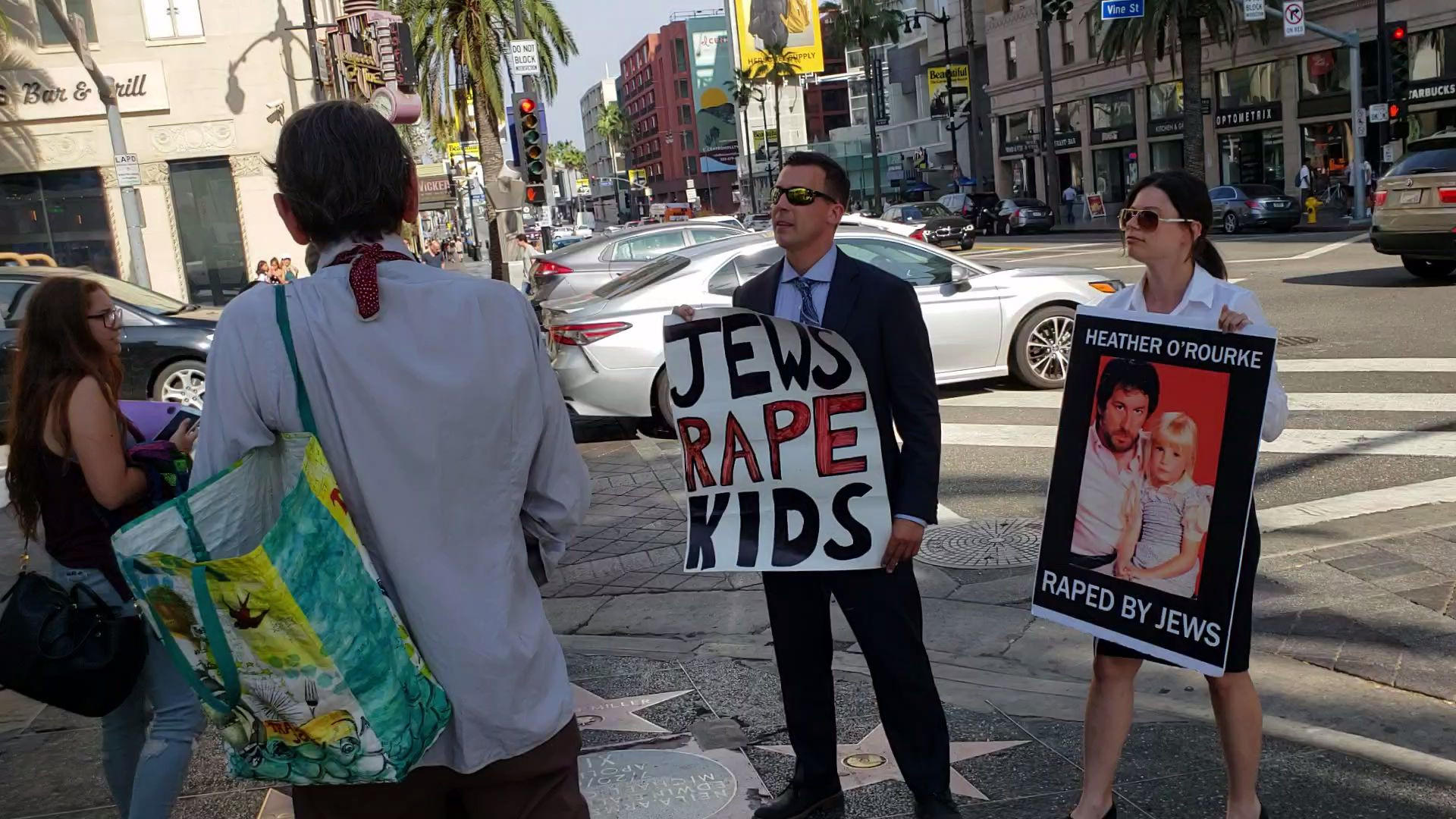
Patrick Little holding a sign on a street corner in Los Angeles (August 2018)

Patrick Little, a member of the GDL, ran on a Republican Party ticket in the 2018 United States Senate election in California for Dianne Feinstein's seat. A native of Albany, California, Little is an IT engineer who had previously served in the United States Marine Corps in Afghanistan. Little's campaign gained attention in May 2018 when he polled second only to Feinstein in a SurveyUSA poll with 18% of the general electorate and 46% with Republicans. However, the California Republican Party denounced Little and he was removed from their convention in San Diego, while stomping on an Israeli flag, claiming "They just had me expelled from the building because I won't serve Israel", calling the California Republican Party "Zionist stooges."

Just after the election, Little toured the United States in July and August 2018, with placards bearing phrases such as "Jews Rape Kids", "Jews Killed 30 Million", "The Holocaust is a Lie" and pronouncing a number of antisemitic conspiracy theories, such as claiming that the Holocaust is a hoax, that Israel played a major role in 9/11, that Jews controlled the African slave trade before the Civil War, and that "Jews kill Christians—they do it a lot historically."

On one occasion in 2018, Little launched a blimp in San Francisco Bay with a text "Jews Rape Kids" (with the subtext "#yidsrapekids") and attempted to fly it near San Francisco's Oracle Park stadium during the Jewish Heritage Night with the San Francisco Giants event but failed due to poor weather conditions. These so-called "J-Walks" were recorded and the videos were put on the internet on platforms such as YouTube and BitChute by Little and the GDL. Little's "Name the Jew" Tour ran from Portland, Oregon to Portland, Maine, stopping off at Olympia, Washington; Seattle; Missoula, Montana; Helena, Montana; Alberton, Montana; Fargo, North Dakota; Minneapolis; Skokie, Illinois; Princeton, New Jersey; New York City; Providence, Rhode Island; and Boston.

Eventually, Little received 62,830 votes, with 1.4% of the total vote share. Little claimed that he was the victim of voter fraud by "the Jewish supremacists and the Zionists" and stated that he would run in the 2020 United States presidential election. He moved to Idaho and ran for one of two vacant seats in the 2019 Garden City, Idaho City Council election, coming in last with 126 votes, 3.7%.

=== Cameo ===
In November 2018, GDL used Cameo to get celebrities to give coded antisemitic shoutouts unknowingly. Among those were NFL quarterback Brett Favre, rapper Soulja Boy, and comedian Andy Dick.

Favre's coded message read "shoutout to the Handsome Truth and the GDL boys," and "Keep fighting, too, and don't ever forget the USS Liberty and the men and women who died on that day," referencing the American ship attacked by the Israeli Air Force in 1967, during the Six-Day War. Soulja Boy's asked viewers to listen to an antisemitic rap track posted online by the GDL, saying "GDL for life, bitch."

=== Overpass banners ===
In December 2021, antisemitic banners were displayed over a Brevard County, Florida highway overpass. The ADL stated that Minadeo had offered $100 in "GoyimTV money" to anyone who could get the network in the news. In October 2022, GDL members including Minadeo hung a banner over a Los Angeles highway saying "Kanye [West] is right about the Jews", in reference to antisemitic comments made by the rapper weeks earlier. In 2025, West attributed his behavior to a history of bipolar disorder and other issues while profusely apologizing to Yoshiyahu Yosef Pinto, with the apology being characterized as disingenuous by the ADL and Shmuley Boteach.

=== Conspiracy theory flyers distribution ===
Antisemitic flyers were distributed in residential areas. The flyers featured lists of officials with Jewish-sounding names (many of whom are not Jews), insinuating that such people at Centers for Disease Control and Prevention were responsible for the spread of the COVID-19 pandemic, were responsible for the Russo-Ukrainian War, that "Every single aspect of the Media is Jewish", and "Every single aspect of Disney child grooming is Jewish". The flyers were hurled onto private driveways, neatly folded in baggies weighed down by pebbles, rice, corn kernels, and/or beans.

These flyers initially appeared in Austin, Texas and Beverly Hills, California during November 2021.

During one weekend in January 2022, flyers appeared in California, Colorado, Florida, Maryland, Texas, and Wisconsin. Flyers were also distributed in Berkeley, San Francisco, Palo Alto, and Marin County, California during February, as well as Atlanta, Cartersville, and Savannah, Georgia in April, Los Angeles in June, and Ann Arbor overnight before Rosh Hashanah on September 25–26, 2022. The ADL said the GDL has continued propaganda drives across 17 states in 2022.

Minadeo and GDL moved to Florida in December 2022. On January 21, 2023, Nicholas A. Bysheim was arrested in Atlantis, Florida for obstructing law enforcement after being ticketed for littering antisemitic hate speech flyers onto residents' lawns. GDL littering incidents also occurred in West Palm Beach and Boca Raton. On January 28, 2023, Jon E. Minadeo II, David Y. Kim, Jonathan K. Baldwin and Nicholas A. Bysheim were cited for littering Palm Beach private residences with their flyers.

In February 2023, flyers were distributed in neighborhoods of Daytona Beach, Florida and at the Daytona 500. Mike Chitwood, the sheriff of Volusia County, Florida, was the target of harassment by the organization due to his stance on hate speech. On March 6, 2023, in Monmouth Junction, New Jersey, a 38-year-old male was arrested after allegedly threatening to kill Chitwood on 4chan.

In June 2023, flyers linked to GDL were distributed via mailboxes in the vicinity of a synagogue in Plainview, New York. These flyers blame Jewish lawmakers for gun control.

In August 2023, GDL flyers were distributed in neighborhoods across Fairfax County, Virginia. A juvenile suspect was arrested and charged with petit larceny after Fairfax Police was alerted to shoplifting at a Target store, and was later found linked to the flyers.

On three separate instances between May and June, a masked 15-year-old wearing all black left baggies of birdseed containing antisemitic flyers on car windshields and driveways in Orillia, Ontario, Canada. On June 21 he was arrested while distributing the flyers and was charged for all three instances.

On October 1, 2026, the information was found to be spread in Belleville, Ontario around the property of the Sons of Jacob Synagogue and other properties in the neighborhood. No suspect has been identified as of November 2026.

=== Projecting messages on buildings ===
A Goyim Defense League member, Robert Wilson, was arrested in Poland and extradited to the Netherlands for allegedly using a projector to display an antisemitic message on the side of the Anne Frank House. GDL members have also used laser projectors to perform similar stunts in the United States. From October 2022 to January 2023, members of the group performed dozens of projections in Florida, including a highly visible incident at the Florida–Georgia football game in Jacksonville, led by Minadeo.

=== March of the Red Shirts ===
On September 2, 2023, members of the group joined members of the neo-Nazi Blood Tribe for a public demonstration in Altamonte Springs, Florida, near Orlando. A few dozen demonstrators participated in what they called the "March of the Red Shirts," waving swastika flags, performing Nazi salutes and shouting "Heil Hitler."

=== Support for Hamas attack on Israel ===
During the 2023 attack on Israeli civilians by the Palestinian militant group Hamas, Minadeo publicly cheered the assault on his livestream, saying "Come on guys, it's time to dance! Get those Jews!" and "Let's go Lebanon, Iran! Wipe Israel off the map! Let's go! This is awesome!" He also announced that the GDL would begin distributing anti-Israel flyers in response, and that he hoped American antisemites would soon lead a similar violent campaign against American Jews.

=== Nashville activities ===
In July 2024, GDL, Patriot Front, and other white supremacist and neo-Nazi organizations handed out flyers, asked passersby if they were Jewish, and disrupted a City Council meeting in Nashville, Tennessee. In response, the Jewish Federation of Greater Nashville organized a peace rally, drawing about 400 participants. One GDL affiliate, Ryan Scott McCann of Ontario, Canada, was arrested in Nashville for allegedly assaulting a local bartender with a flagpole. He is charged with felony aggravated assault. On July 30, 2025, McCann pled guilty to one count of assault misdemeanor and was sentenced to 3 years and 9 months in prison.

=== "City Council Death Squad" ===
In 2023, GDL affiliates created a sub-group called City Council Death Squad, which began targeting public forums—both virtually and in-person—with antisemitic, racist, and other hateful disruptions. According to the ADL, the initiative was formalized by California resident and GDL associate Harley Petero. "It Could Happen Here" also produced a February 13, 2024 podcast about the City Council Death Squad's attacks on representative democracy meetings with zoombombing during public comment with their anti-Americanism, antisemitic, racist, and sexist attacks led many jurisdictions to close or reduce access to public comment periods at public meetings—especially in California.
