= Whaleman Foundation =

American marine conservation organization

The Whaleman Foundation
- Founder: Jeff Pantukhoff
- Type: Nonprofit
- Tax ID no.: 99-0331050
- Legal status: 501(c)(3)
- Purpose: protection of cetaceans (whales, dolphins, and porpoises)
- Headquarters: Lahaina, Hawaii
- Region served: Global
- Key people: Jeff Pantukhoff, Hayden Panettiere, Pierce Brosnan, Adrian Grenier
- Website: https://whaleman.org/

The Whaleman Foundation is a non-profit, marine conservation organization based in Lahaina, Hawaii in the United States. It advocates for the protection of cetaceans (whales, dolphins, and porpoises) and their habitats.

Whaleman was founded by Jeff Pantukhoff. Hayden Panettiere was the spokesperson for the foundation. She had promoted the Foundations' Save the Whales Again! campaign since 2008.
