= Henry W. Wright =

American politician

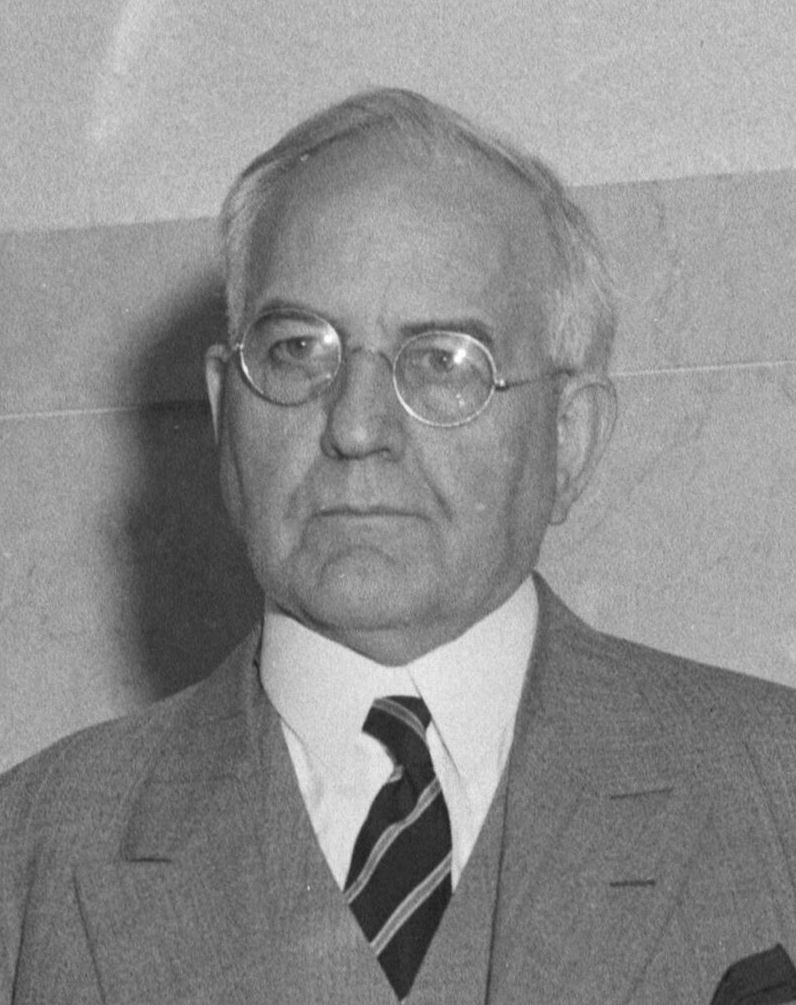
- Wright in 1932

Chair of Los Angeles County
- In office December 5, 1922 – December 2, 1924
- Preceded by: Reuban F. McClellan
- Succeeded by: Reuban F. McClellan
- In office December 2, 1930 – December 6, 1932
- Preceded by: Reuban F. McClellan
- Succeeded by: Frank L. Shaw

Member of the Los Angeles County Board of Supervisors
- In office 1921–1933
- Preceded by: Jonathan S. Dodge
- Succeeded by: Roger W. Jessup

40th Speaker of the California State Assembly
- In office January 6, 1919 – 1921
- Preceded by: C. C. Young
- Succeeded by: Frank Merriam

Member of the California State Assembly from the 69th district
- In office January 4, 1915 – January 8, 1923
- Preceded by: Egbert J. Gates
- Succeeded by: Charles B. Dawson

Personal details
- Born: Henry Ward Wright; March 4, 1868 Chickasaw County, Iowa, U.S.
- Died: August 19, 1948 (aged 80) South Pasadena, California, U.S.
- Party: Republican
- Other political affiliations: Progressive
- Spouse: Nellie Blanche Wright
- Children: 3
- Education: Iowa State College; Omaha Commercial College

Henry Ward Wright (March 4, 1868 – August 19, 1948) was an American politician who served in the California State Assembly and as Speaker of the Assembly.

== Early life and education ==
On March 4, 1868, Henry W. Wright was born near Ionia, Iowa in Chickasaw County, Iowa to Methodists. He graduated from Iowa State College and Omaha Commercial College.

== Career ==
Wright held a minor office in Minnesota until he moved to California in 1905.

During the 1912 presidential election he joined Theodore Roosevelt's Progressive Party and was elected to the state assembly in 1914. From 1915 to 1921 he served in the California State Assembly and on was selected as Speaker of the California State Assembly by acclamation on January 6, 1919. When the United States entered World War I he was appointed to a district draft board. He was elected to the Los Angeles County Board of Supervisors in 1921 and served until he was defeated by Roger W. Jessup in 1932.

On March 30, 1926, he announced that he would run for the Republican nomination in the ninth congressional district for the 1926 election, but came in last with 10.19% of the vote behind William E. Evans, Charles Hiram Randall, and Harold B. Landreth.

On August 18, 1948, Wright died at Huntington Hospital in Pasadena, California.

== Electoral history ==
Henry W. Wright electoral history

1916 Sixty Ninth Assembly District election
Party	Candidate	Votes	%
Republican	Henry W. Wright	9,364	55.64%
Independent	Alexander A. Weber	4,135	24.57%
Prohibition	Alice P. Woertendyke	3,330	19.79%
Total votes		16,829	100%

1926 California Ninth Congressional District Republican primary
Party	Candidate	Votes	%
Republican	William E. Evans	29,795	35.13%
Republican	Charles Hiram Randall	25,164	29.67%
Republican	Harold B. Landreth	21,203	25.00%
Republican	Henry W. Wright	8,642	10.19%
Total votes		84,804	100%
