= Tom Umberg =

American politician (born 1955)

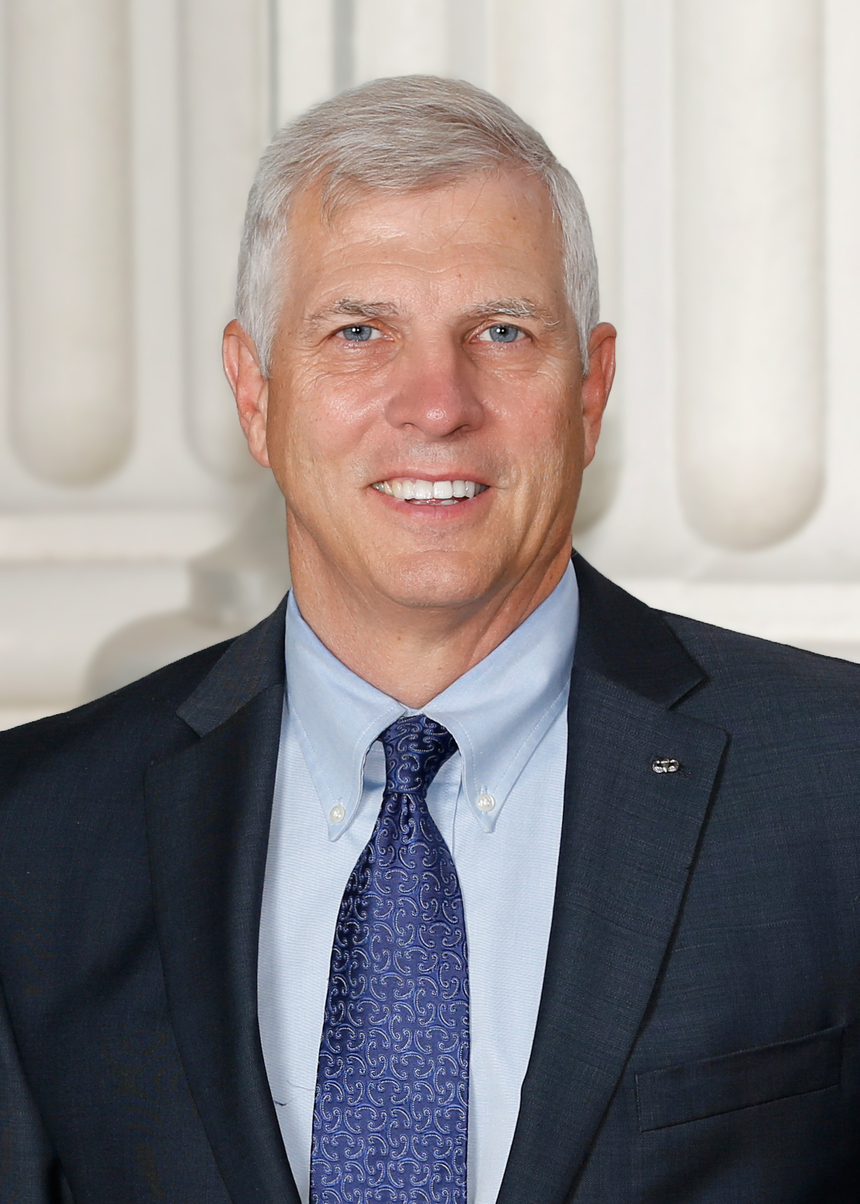
- Official portrait, 2018

Member-elect of the California State Board of Equalization from the 4th district
- Assuming office January 4, 2027
- Succeeding: Mike Schaefer

Member of the California State Senate from the 34th district
- Incumbent
- Assumed office December 3, 2018
- Preceded by: Janet Nguyen

Member of the California State Assembly
- In office December 6, 2004 – December 4, 2006
- Preceded by: Lou Correa
- Succeeded by: Jose Solorio
- Constituency: 69th district (2004–2006)
- In office December 3, 1990 – December 5, 1994
- Succeeded by: Jim Morrissey
- Constituency: 72nd district (1990–1992); 69th district (1992–1994)

Personal details
- Born: Thomas John Umberg; September 25, 1955 (age 71) Cincinnati, Ohio, U.S.
- Party: Democratic
- Spouse: Robin Umberg
- Children: 3
- Education: University of California, Los Angeles (BA); University of California, Hastings (JD)
- Website: State Senate website Campaign website

Military service
- Allegiance: United States
- Branch/service: United States Army
- Rank: Colonel
- Battles/wars: War on Terror

Thomas John Umberg (born September 25, 1955) is an American politician currently serving in the California State Senate. A Democrat, he represents the 34th district, which encompasses parts of northern Orange County and a small portion of unincorporated Los Angeles County. Previously, he served in the California State Assembly, representing the 69th District. He is a partner at Umberg Zipser LLP in Orange County.

== Early life, education, and military service ==
Born in Cincinnati, Ohio of German ancestry, Umberg graduated with honors from the University of California, Los Angeles in 1977. He was commissioned Second Lieutenant in the U.S. Army, then promoted to captain. Umberg served with the 2nd Infantry Division in South Korea and with NATO forces in Italy during his time in the army. Umberg also served as a paratrooper with the US Army Special Operations Command, US Army Special Warfare Center and the XVIIIth Airborne Corp. Umberg completed the Harvard University, Kennedy School of Public Policy, Program for Senior Executives in National Security. He was also awarded a master's degree in Strategic Studies from the U.S. Army War College. Umberg remained in the U.S. Army Reserve, rising to the rank of colonel. Umberg's military decorations include: the Bronze Star, Meritorious Service Medal (2d award), the US Coast Guard Distinguished Public Service Award, the Army Commendation Medal (2d award), the Army Achievement Medal.

== Early career ==
After receiving his Juris Doctor degree from UC San Francisco, College of the Law in 1980, he was appointed an Assistant U.S. Attorney in Orange County. He had a 100% conviction rate prosecuting drug dealers, gang members, white collar criminals, and civil rights cases. He also served as a military prosecutor between 1980 and 1985. As a federal prosecutor, Umberg tried several high-profile cases including “Uranium for Tax Dollars,” “Marco Numismatics” (a nationwide fraud on seniors), and the last cross-burning case in Orange County.

== Political career ==
=== Santa Ana poll guard controversy ===
As the federal prosecutor on duty in 1988 for the U.S. Attorney's office on Election Day, Umberg received reports that police officers were preventing Latinos from voting in Santa Ana. Umberg and another attorney responded to the location of the report, and identified a woman dressed in attire that made her appear as a police officer with a sign that said "Non-Citizens Can't Vote". Umberg noted that when he arrived the woman spoke with a Latino couple that came to vote, and after their discussion, they walked away. The Orange County Republican Party allegedly organized the effort to protect one of their incumbents, who went on to win the election by 1,000 votes. Umberg resigned from his position in the U.S. Attorney's office to run for the Assembly, citing the incident as his reason for running.

=== First stint in state Assembly ===
Umberg was first elected to the California State Assembly in 1990, defeating incumbent Republican Curt Pringle, who was identified as the beneficiary of the previous poll guard effort. Umberg was re-elected in 1992. While in the Assembly he served as Chairman of the Environmental Safety and Toxic Materials Committee. Instead of seeking a third term in 1994, Umberg ran for Attorney General of California but lost to Republican Dan Lungren in the general election. Umberg then joined the law firm of Morrison & Foerster LLP in 1995 as a partner. He was the Managing Partner of Morrison & Foerster's Orange County Office from 2003 until 2005.

=== Deputy Director, Office of National Drug Control Policy ===
During the 1996 presidential election, he served as the Director of the Clinton re-election campaign in California. Clinton appointed and the Senate confirmed Umberg as the Deputy Director of the Office of National Drug Control Policy (colloquially known as the Office of the Drug Czar) in 1997 where he served until 2000 directly under Director and retired U.S. Army General Barry McCaffrey. In this capacity he was responsible for the development and coordination of United States policy to reduce the supply of illegal drugs, including interdiction, counter-drug intelligence, negotiation and coordination with foreign governments. Umberg held the highest level of U.S. security clearance, granting access to Top Secret information in addition to specialized Sensitive Compartmented Information. Tom also served as a senior member to the U.S./Mexico High Level Contact Group and as a member of the U.S. Delegation to the Summit of the Americas in Santiago, Chile.

=== Second stint in state Assembly ===
In 2004, Umberg was re-elected to the Assembly to represent the 69th District. During his third term, Umberg chaired the Elections and Redistricting Committee. While in the legislature, Umberg authored over 60 measures which became law. These laws include measures dealing with hate crimes, white collar crime, campaign finance reform, high-speed rail transport, and school meal programs.. In 2005, Umberg was the 41st, and decisive, vote on AB 849 to legalize same-sex marriage in California. During the floor debate, Umberg stated, "It's always a dilemma whether to follow or lead. This is one of those times history is looking to us to lead," and that of all the constituents who contacted him on the bill, he had ultimately looked to his three children. "I wanted them to look back and see where I was when we could make a difference, if I stood with those who took a leadership role in terms of tolerance, equity and fairness. And I'll be proud to say I did.".

=== 2006 state Senate campaign ===
Umberg sought the seat of retiring State Senator Joe Dunn (D) in the 2006 elections. Orange County Supervisor and former Assemblyman Lou Correa jumped in the race in January 2006 as well. Correa received pressure from the local Democratic party for him to stay out but was pressured by the state Democratic party for him to jump in and stating that he was running in part because of the allegations about Umberg's residency. Aside from other negative articles, Umberg also received criticism that he voted to legalize gay marriage. Umberg attempted to get Correa off the ballot because Correa submitted more than the number of signatures required to qualify for the ballot, but ultimately failed. Umberg also claimed that an alliance between Correa and State Senate President Pro Tem Don Perata to funnel funds to Correa's campaign was illegal. Umberg was defeated by Correa by a 60% to 40% margin, and Correa went on to narrowly win the general election.

=== Orange County Supervisorial campaign ===
After Correa won the general election for the state Senate by a 1% margin, Umberg entered the race to replace Correa on the Orange County Board of Supervisors, representing the 1st Supervisorial District. 52% of 1st Supervisorial District voters are also voters in the 69th Assembly District, formerly represented by Umberg. 73% of 1st Supervisorial District voters are also 34th Senate District voters, so Umberg was believed to be the favorite. On 6 February 2007, Umberg received 21.4%, coming in third, far less than he had been expected to poll. The winner was Garden Grove City councilwoman Janet Nguyen.

=== State Senate ===
In 2018, Umberg entered the race for California's 34th Senatorial District, setting up a rematch against State Senator Janet Nguyen, who had won the seat in 2014 and was seeking reelection. A priority race for the legislature, Umberg received widespread support from officials across Orange and Los Angeles Counties, including U.S. Congressmembers Adam Schiff and Lou Correa. Umberg initially trailed by 19 points on election night, but steadily gained in the days following to prevail by 3,200 votes in an election where over 260,000 had voted, and was the last race to be called in California for that cycle. Nguyen requested a partial recount of precincts in Santa Ana, but this did not change the outcome. Nguyen never conceded to Umberg.

After being sworn in, Umberg was named Chair of the Senate Committee on Elections and Constitutional Amendments by President pro tempore of the California State Senate, Toni Atkins. In 2021, Umberg was appointed Chair of the Senate Committee on the Judiciary and, as Chair, held a seat on the Judicial Council of California. Umberg was reappointed Judiciary Chair by Mike McGuire after he succeeded Atkins as Pro Tem. During Umberg's tenure in the Senate, he was praised for his bipartisanship and strong record of introducing and passing legislation. Umberg was considered a finalist by Governor Gavin Newsom to be appointed California Attorney General following the appointment of Xavier Becerra in the Biden Administration.

In 2025, the Senate voted to reduce the number of bills individual legislators were allowed to introduce from 40 to 35. Umberg gained attention by introducing 33 bills in that year alone, the most by any legislator. Of those, 16 were signed by the Governor, the most policy bills signed by any single legislator, the most for any legislator that year. In his final year in the Senate, Umberg authored or co-authored 12 bills, of which 10 became law including an expansion of the state's CARE Court program, bans on the sale of Nitrous oxide, preventing United States Immigration and Customs Enforcement activity in polling places and state courthouses, and a bill to address safety issues related to a methyl methacrylate leak in Garden Grove, CA.

Umberg was limited to three terms in the State Assembly and two terms in the State Senate under Proposition 140 (1990). In 2026, Umberg was one of only two elected officials who served in the legislature in the 1990s who was still in elected office. During his legislative career, Umberg authored 169 laws and brought $841.7 million to Orange County.

==== Elections ====
Umberg served as Chair of the Senate Elections Committee during the COVID-19 pandemic, and joint-authored AB 860 which codified that county elections officials must mail a ballot to every registered, active voter ahead of the November 3, 2020 General Election. Umberg also authored SB 398 in response to Elon Musk's voter registration lotteries in Wisconsin's Supreme Court election. The bill was signed by Governor Newsom on October 2, 2025. Additionally, Umberg authored SB 42, a bill that would ask voters to end the statewide ban on local cities and counties from establishing public financing systems for local elections. The ban had been in place since Proposition 73 passed in 1988. The measure passed the legislature and was signed by the Governor and will appear on the November 2026 ballot as Proposition 4 (2026).

==== Artificial intelligence ====
As Judiciary Committee Chair, Umberg played a key role in the regulation of artificial intelligence legislation. His role was even lauded as "the Chief Gatekeeper of AI". Umberg opposed Trump Administration efforts to restrict and penalize state efforts to regulate artificial intelligence, calling it, "a dereliction of duty wrapped in yet another distraction from a fracturing MAGA movement and a president who doesn’t understand the real dangers of rapidly advancing tech".

==== CARE Courts ====
In 2022, Umberg was asked by Governor Newsom to author SB 1338 or the Community Assistance, Recovery, and Empowerment Act, creating the state's CARE Courts which was signed by the Governor that year at a public ceremony in San Jose. The program is designed to help families and reduce homelessness by using court authority to order the treatment and housing prioritization of severely mentally ill Californians. Umberg thanked legislators in his floor remarks for sharing their personal stories and stated, "There are Californians right now... that are looking for their loved ones and they're looking because they don't know what to do and they don't know how to find them help... But I am hopeful and what gives me incredible hope is the breadth and scope of the support from our colleagues... I do think we have this unique opportunity, this unique time, where we have the resources and the collective political will to make a huge difference." The bill received only 1 no vote in the Senate, and 2 no votes in the Assembly. The bill was expanded in 2025 to include those with severe bipolar disorder.

==== Housing and Project Homekey ====
In 2019, Umberg authored SB 450, which created a California Environmental Quality Act exemption to allow cities and counties to purchase dilapidated hotels and motels and convert them into transitional housing and was sponsored by the City of Long Beach. The bill passed unanimously in the Senate and received only 2 no votes in the Assembly. The following year, Governor Newsom implemented Project Homekey, which utilized Umberg's bill to provide funding to cities and counties to purchase hotels and motels for conversion to address the state's homelessness crisis.

==== Fentanyl and Alexandra's Law ====
Umberg introduced several laws to combat fentanyl abuse across the state. Umberg authored bills compelling social media companies to take down pages and accounts that sold fentanyl, a "Good Samaritan law" to protect individuals from prosecution if they report overdoses to encourage reporting overdose incidents to police, and required public venues to have naloxone and other overdose reversing medications on site.

In 2023, Umberg introduced SB 44, or "Alexandra's Law", named after Alexandra Capelouto who died after purchasing drugs on Snapchat mistakenly laced with fentanyl. Variations had been introduced in previous years by Republican legislators, but the bill had been unable to receive a hearing. Alexandra's father, Matt, approached Umberg to carry the bill in the hopes it would have a better chance to succeed. The bill would have required a judge to read an admonishment to drug dealers that mistakenly deal bad drugs resulting in the death of a customer, similar to the Watson Admonishment judges issue in cases of drunk driving. This admonishment allows, but does not require, prosecutors to pursue homicide charges if the same drug dealer is responsible for subsequent customer death. Despite passing the Public Safety committee and having the majority of Senators sponsoring the bill, the bill died in the Senate Appropriations Committee.

In 2024, Umberg reintroduced the bill as SB 21 with largely the same language. The bill again was sponsored by the majority of Senators, but died in the Public Safety committee. Umberg gutted and amended one of his other bills, SB 22, to try and pass the bill, but it was again killed in committee. That year, the language for Alexandra's Law from SB 22 was adopted by proponents of Proposition 36 and became law when it passed in November.

=== Board of Equalization ===
In November 2026, Umberg was elected to the California State Board of Equalization representing District 4, which includes the counties of Orange, San Diego, Riverside, Imperial, and part of San Bernardino County.

== Personal life ==
Umberg is married to Brigadier General Robin Umberg, whom he met on a military flight to South Korea where they were both stationed. Tom has three children: Brett, Tommy, and Erin Umberg. Tommy and Erin Umberg both attended law school at UC Berkeley, and subsequently went into private practice.

== Electoral history ==
Tom Umberg electoral history

=== 1990's ===
1990 California State Assembly 72nd district election
Primary election
Party	Candidate	Votes	%
Democratic	Tom Umberg	8,911	64.64
Democratic	Jerry Yudelson	4,874	35.36
Total votes		13,785	100.0
General election
Democratic	Tom Umberg	25,247	51.9
Republican	Curt Pringle (incumbent)	23,411	48.1
Total votes		48,658	100.0
Democratic gain from Republican			

1992 California State Assembly 69th district election
Primary election
Party	Candidate	Votes	%
Democratic	Tom Umberg (incumbent)	9,637	100.0
Total votes		9,637	100.0
General election
Democratic	Tom Umberg (incumbent)	32,700	60.0
Republican	Jo Ellen Allen	18,560	34.1
Libertarian	David R. Keller	3,217	5.9
Total votes		54,477	100.0
Democratic gain from Republican			

1994 California Attorney General election
Primary election
Party	Candidate	Votes	%
Democratic	Tom Umberg	1,715,098	100.0
Total votes		1,715,098	100.0
General election
Republican	Dan Lungren (incumbent)	4,438,733	53.9
Democratic	Tom Umberg	3,256,070	39.5
Libertarian	Richard N. Burns	274,335	3.3
Peace and Freedom	Robert J. Evans	271,459	3.3
Total votes		7,694,803	100.0
Republican hold			

=== 2000's ===
2002 California Insurance Commissioner Democratic primary
Party	Candidate	Votes	%
Democratic	John Garamendi	800,146	38.6
Democratic	Tom Umberg	586,112	28.3
Democratic	Thomas M. Calderon	476,234	22.9
Democratic	Bill Winslow	213,239	10.2
Total votes		2,075,731	100.0

2004 California State Assembly 69th district election
Primary election
Party	Candidate	Votes	%
Democratic	Tom Umberg	8,510	51.1
Democratic	Claudia Alvarez	8,145	48.9
Total votes		16,655	100.0
General election
Democratic	Tom Umberg	38,516	61.4
Republican	Otto Bade	19,811	31.5
Libertarian	George Reis	4,470	7.1
Total votes		62,797	100.0
Democratic hold			

2006 California State Senate 34th district Democratic primary
Party	Candidate	Votes	%
Democratic	Lou Correa	17,409	59.8
Democratic	Tom Umberg	11,731	40.2
Total votes		29,140	100.0

2007 Orange County Supervisor 1st district special election
Party	Candidate	Votes	%
Republican	Janet Nguyen	10,919	24.1
Republican	Trung Nguyen	10,912	24.1
Democratic	Tom Umberg	9,725	21.4
Republican	Carlos Bustamante	7,460	16.5
Democratic	Mark Rosen	2,181	4.8
Republican	Brett Elliott Franklin	1,739	3.8
Republican	Kermit Marsh	1,335	2.9
Republican	Larry Phan	417	0.9
Republican	Lupe Moreno	383	0.8
Democratic	Benny Diaz	273	0.6
Total votes		45,343	100.0

=== 2010's ===
2018 California State Senate 34th district election
Primary election
Party	Candidate	Votes	%
Republican	Janet Nguyen (incumbent)	82,874	58.3
Democratic	Tom Umberg	37,360	26.3
Democratic	Jestin L. Samson	13,231	9.3
Democratic	Akash A. Hawkins	8,746	6.1
Total votes		142,211	100.0
General election
Democratic	Tom Umberg	135,062	50.6
Republican	Janet Nguyen (incumbent)	131,973	49.4
Total votes		267,035	100.0
Democratic gain from Republican			

=== 2020's ===
2022 California State Senate 34th district election
Primary election
Party	Candidate	Votes	%
Democratic	Tom Umberg (incumbent)	55,525	58.3
Republican	Rhonda Shader	39,728	41.7
Total votes		95,253	100.0
General election
Democratic	Tom Umberg (incumbent)	96,419	58.8
Republican	Rhonda Shader	67,633	41.2
Total votes		164,052	100.0
Democratic hold			
