= 1994 California Attorney General election =

- November 8, 1994

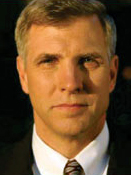
Nominee	Dan Lungren	Tom Umberg
Party	Republican	Democratic
Popular vote	4,438,733	3,256,070
Percentage	53.9%	39.5%
- County results Lungren: 40-50% 50–60% 60–70% 70–80% Umberg: 40–50% 50–60%
Attorney General before election
Dan Lungren
Republican
Elected Attorney General
Dan Lungren
Republican

The 1994 California Attorney General election elas held on Tuesday November 8. The primary elections was held on March 8, 1994. The Republican incumbent, Dan Lungren, easily defeated the Democratic nominee, Assemblyman Tom Umberg. Every candidate in this race was unopposed in the primary. As of 2026, this was the last time that a Republican was elected Attorney General of California.

== Election results ==
Final results from the Secretary of State of California.

California Attorney General election, 1994
Party	Candidate	Votes	%
Republican	Dan Lungren (incumbent)	4,438,733	53.86
Democratic	Tom Umberg	3,256,070	39.51
Libertarian	Richard N. Burns	274,335	3.33
Peace and Freedom	Robert J. Evans	271,459	3.29
Invalid or blank votes		660,039	7.42
Total votes		8,240,597	100.00
Turnout			46.98
Republican hold			

=== Results by county ===
Results from the Secretary of State of California:

County	Lungren	Votes	Umberg	Votes	Burns	Votes	Evans	Votes
Sutter	71.15%	15,380	23.80%	5,144	2.48%	536	2.57%	555
Colusa	69.71%	3,395	25.65%	1,249	2.75%	134	1.89%	92
Placer	68.06%	50,220	26.60%	19,626	3.26%	2,405	2.08%	1,534
El Dorado	66.94%	35,636	26.88%	14,309	3.80%	2,025	2.37%	1,262
Inyo	66.90%	4,680	27.02%	1,890	3.29%	230	2.79%	195
Madera	66.71%	17,241	28.00%	7,238	2.53%	654	2.76%	713
Glenn	65.71%	5,088	29.19%	2,260	2.49%	193	2.61%	202
Nevada	65.15%	24,165	27.64%	10,252	4.39%	1,629	2.81%	1,043
Amador	64.91%	8,401	29.75%	3,850	3.18%	411	2.16%	280
Tulare	64.90%	48,669	29.21%	21,900	2.51%	1,885	3.38%	2,531
Tuolumne	64.10%	12,435	30.18%	5,855	3.28%	636	2.44%	473
Fresno	63.66%	110,038	31.19%	53,905	2.44%	4,222	2.71%	4,676
Calaveras	63.60%	9,796	29.60%	4,559	4.20%	647	2.60%	401
Mariposa	63.28%	4,383	29.34%	2,032	3.75%	260	3.62%	251
Kern	63.03%	91,625	30.58%	44,451	3.30%	4,799	3.10%	4,502
Shasta	62.99%	33,887	30.38%	16,345	3.69%	1,987	2.94%	1,579
Yuba	62.92%	8,661	29.53%	4,065	3.97%	547	3.57%	492
Modoc	62.45%	2,337	28.25%	1,057	5.05%	189	4.25%	159
Orange	62.29%	451,701	32.52%	235,852	3.12%	22,602	2.07%	14,988
Plumas	62.24%	5,104	30.46%	2,498	4.29%	352	3.00%	246
Sierra	61.92%	974	29.05%	457	5.59%	88	3.43%	54
Mono	61.59%	2,059	30.18%	1,009	5.06%	169	3.17%	106
Kings	61.50%	13,437	33.17%	7,247	2.34%	512	2.99%	653
Stanislaus	61.30%	59,610	33.30%	32,380	2.57%	2,497	2.83%	2,754
Sacramento	61.04%	211,825	33.21%	115,250	2.99%	10,373	2.75%	9,552
San Joaquin	60.83%	74,634	34.29%	42,063	2.38%	2,919	2.50%	3,069
Riverside	60.52%	199,134	33.66%	110,742	3.05%	10,036	2.77%	9,128
Butte	60.38%	39,981	33.03%	21,868	3.53%	2,337	3.06%	2,028
Siskiyou	60.28%	10,601	31.46%	5,532	4.61%	811	3.65%	642
San Diego	60.02%	427,643	33.57%	239,167	3.58%	25,477	2.84%	20,236
Lassen	59.63%	4,732	31.14%	2,471	5.57%	442	3.67%	291
Merced	59.37%	22,723	35.40%	13,548	2.50%	958	2.73%	1,043
Ventura	59.19%	122,779	34.50%	71,566	3.40%	7,053	2.92%	6,048
San Bernardino	58.79%	196,938	34.75%	116,406	3.26%	10,920	3.20%	10,705
Tehama	57.21%	10,344	35.47%	6,413	4.28%	773	3.05%	551
Alpine	56.71%	359	31.60%	200	7.11%	45	4.58%	29
Lake	55.40%	10,594	37.63%	7,196	3.64%	697	3.33%	637
Del Norte	54.92%	3,992	37.65%	2,737	4.20%	305	3.23%	235
San Luis Obispo	54.63%	45,413	38.62%	32,108	3.59%	2,985	3.16%	2,629
Trinity	54.48%	2,877	33.31%	1,759	6.85%	362	5.36%	283
Napa	53.84%	22,117	39.58%	16,259	3.55%	1,458	3.03%	1,246
Santa Barbara	52.78%	65,705	40.39%	50,285	3.35%	4,174	3.47%	4,326
Contra Costa	52.02%	145,237	41.53%	115,942	3.30%	9,211	3.15%	8,802
Solano	51.90%	49,601	41.52%	39,688	3.29%	3,147	3.29%	3,143
Sonoma	51.69%	78,895	39.01%	59,541	4.32%	6,591	4.98%	7,601
Imperial	50.57%	11,579	41.12%	9,417	3.52%	805	4.79%	1,098
Yolo	50.25%	23,794	42.45%	20,099	3.55%	1,679	3.76%	1,779
Monterey	49.68%	43,855	43.73%	38,602	3.24%	2,859	3.35%	2,960
San Benito	49.64%	5,569	43.20%	4,847	3.58%	402	3.57%	401
Santa Clara	49.18%	206,729	42.74%	179,637	4.38%	18,423	3.70%	15,541
Los Angeles	48.44%	955,926	45.27%	893,410	2.99%	58,929	3.30%	65,151
Mendocino	48.36%	13,872	38.91%	11,161	5.31%	1,522	7.42%	2,128
San Mateo	47.78%	97,629	45.40%	92,753	3.50%	7,149	3.32%	6,785
Humboldt	46.79%	21,522	42.44%	19,518	4.64%	2,133	6.14%	2,822
Marin	46.55%	46,678	45.78%	45,909	3.76%	3,771	3.91%	3,921
Santa Cruz	39.98%	34,362	47.52%	40,843	5.82%	5,000	6.69%	5,751
Alameda	38.23%	144,754	53.83%	203,850	3.38%	12,799	4.56%	17,285
San Francisco	31.31%	67,418	58.45%	125,853	3.80%	8,181	6.44%	13,872

== See also ==
- California state elections, 1994
- California Attorney General
- List of attorneys general of California
