= Robin Umberg =

United States Army general

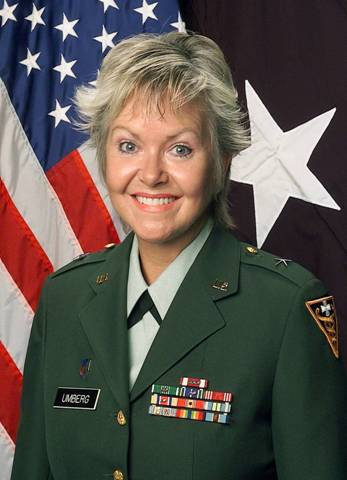
- Brigadier General Robin Umberg
- Born: c. 1955; Fort Worth, Texas
- Military career
- Allegiance: United States of America
- Branch: United States Army
- Service years: 1973-2010
- Rank: Brigadier General
- Unit: 3rd Medical Command (Deployment Support)
- Commands: Deputy Commander of Professional Services (2005-2010)
- Conflicts: Desert Shield; Desert Storm
- Awards: Legion of Merit; Meritorious Service Medal (4); Army Commendation Medal (3); Army Achievement Medal (2)

Brigadier General Robin Umberg (born c. 1955), Deputy Commander Clinical Services 3rd Medical Command, is one of several female United States Army general officers.

== Military career ==
Umberg began her 36-year military career at the age of 18 when she enlisted and received a four-year military scholarship from the Walter Reed Army Institute of Nursing (WRAIN). She was commissioned a First Lieutenant in 1977. Her active duty assignments included Walter Reed Army Medical Center, Washington D.C., the USAMEDDAC Fort Carson, Colorado, the 121st Evacuation Hospital, Seoul, Korea, and the United States Army Hospital in Vicenza, Italy. In 1990, she deployed in support of Operations Desert Shield/Storm.

She served in a variety of command and staff assignments in the Army to include: Commander, 4211th US Army Hospital, San Diego, CA; Commander, 6253rd US Army Hospital, Mesa, AZ; Chief Nurse, 18th Field Hospital, Fort Story, VA; Executive Officer, 349th General Hospital; and Training Officer, 6252nd US Army Hospital, Irvine, CA. On May 8, 2005, she was assigned Deputy Commander of Professional Services, 3rd Medical Command (Deployment Support), Fort Gillem, Georgia. BG Umberg focused on battlefield readiness, training, and career management for more than 27,000 Army medical personnel.

== Awards ==
Umberg's military awards include the Legion of Merit, the Meritorious Service Medal with three Oak Leaf Clusters, the Army Commendation Medal with two Oak Leaf Clusters, the Army Achievement Medal with one Oak Leaf Cluster, the Humanitarian Service Medal, Military Outstanding Volunteer Service Medal, Army Reserve Components Achievement Medal with Silver Oak Leaf Cluster, National Defense Service Medal with Bronze Service Star, Armed Forces Reserve Medal with Gold Hourglass and M Device, Good Conduct Medal, and two Overseas Service Ribbons. She was inducted into the Order of Military Medical Merit in 2006. In 2014, she received the "Lifetime Achievement Award" for her service to Veterans.

== Education ==
Her military education includes the AMEDD Officers Basic Course, Army Critical Care Nursing Course, the AMEDD Officers Advanced Course, Principals of Advanced Nursing Administration, Command and General Staff College, Army Nurse Corps Senior Field Leadership Course, Medical Management of Chemical, Biological, and Nuclear Casualties Course, and the Reserve National Security Course. Umberg received her Bachelor of Science in nursing from the University of Maryland and her Master of Science in Health Care Administration from the University of Northern Colorado.

== Civilian career ==
In her civilian capacity, Umberg has been a Medical-Legal Consultant and business owner. In November 2000, President Bill Clinton appointed her to serve on the Board of Visitors of the U.S. Military Academy at West Point. In May 2009, she served as a Regional Panelist for the President's Commission on White House Fellowships. In 2011, BG Umberg became a member of Mission Readiness—an organization of Admirals and Generals with a mission to improve childhood nutrition as a National Security issue.

On May 20, 2011, California Governor Jerry Brown appointed Brigadier General Robin Umberg to oversee the Veterans Homes Division in the California Department of Veterans Affairs. Governor Brown elevated Brigadier General Robin Umberg to the level of Undersecretary California Department of Veterans Affairs in 2011. In 2012, she joined the board of the Public Private Partnership for Justice Reform in Afghanistan working in collaboration with the State Department to expand the Rule of Law in Afghanistan. She was a part of the delegation traveling to Kabul in 2012 and 2013. In Dec 2019, BG Umberg was appointed by Governor Brown and in 2022 and 2026 reappointed by Governor Newsom to the California Veterans Board that serves to advocate for Veterans and decide Veteran appeals on decisions made by Calvet. She is a member of the American Legion, Reserve Officer Association, and the Military Officer Association of America. She received the Lifetime Achievement Award for service to Veterans.

== Personal life ==
She currently resides in California with her husband, Tom Umberg who is a retired Army Colonel and current member of the California State Senate. They have three children, Brett, Tommy, and Erin Umberg.
