= California's 69th State Assembly district =

American legislative district

Current assemblymember
Josh Lowenthal; D–Long Beach
- Population (2010) • Voting age • Citizen voting age: 465,317; 324,581; 172,928
- Demographics: 12.14% White; 1.46% Black; 76.14% Latino; 9.26% Asian; 0.27% Native American; 0.33% Hawaiian/Pacific Islander; 0.16% other; 0.24% remainder of multiracial
- Registered voters: 165,843
- Registration: 52.47% Democratic; 18.01% Republican; 25.11% No party preference

California's 69th State Assembly district is one of 80 California State Assembly districts. It is currently represented by Democrat Josh Lowenthal.

== District profile ==
The district encompasses Signal Hill, Avalon, and parts of Carson and Long Beach. The district contains the largest population of Cambodians outside of Cambodia and one of the largest populations of Filipino people outside of the Philippines.

Orange County – 15.5%

- Anaheim – 39.5%
- Garden Grove – 21.8%
- Orange – 7.4%
- Santa Ana – 87.8%

== Election results from statewide races ==
Year	Office	Results
2021	Recall	No 70.2 – 29.8%
2020	President	Biden 68.7 – 29.1%
2018	Governor	Newsom 69.4 – 30.6%
2018	Senator	Feinstein 52.9 – 47.1%
2016	President	Clinton 71.9 – 22.3%
2016	Senator	Sanchez 62.1 – 37.9%
2014	Governor	Brown 66.3 – 33.7%
2012	President	Obama 67.4 – 30.7%
2012	Senator	Feinstein 68.9 – 31.1%

== List of assembly members representing the district ==
Due to redistricting, the 69th district has been moved around different parts of the state. The current iteration resulted from the 2021 redistricting by the California Citizens Redistricting Commission.

Assembly members	Party	Years served	Counties represented	Notes
Saron Nathaniel Laughlin	Republican	January 3, 1885 – January 3, 1887	Monterey	
Thomas Renison	Democratic	January 3, 1887 – January 5, 1891	Monterey	
Claude Fontaine Lacey	Republican	January 5, 1891 – January 2, 1893	Monterey	
David T. Perkins	Republican	January 2, 1893 – January 7, 1895	Ventura	
Peter Bennett	Republican	January 7, 1895 – January 4, 1897	Ventura	
Thomas O. Toland	People	January 4, 1897 – January 2, 1899	Ventura	
Charles B. Greenwell	Republican	January 2, 1899 – January 1, 1901	Ventura	
Robert M. Clarke	Republican	January 1, 1901 – January 5, 1903	Ventura	
Edgar Whittlesey Camp	Republican	January 5, 1903 – January 2, 1905	Los Angeles	
Newton Warner Thompson	Republican	January 2, 1905 – January 4, 1909	Los Angeles	
Harry Barndollar	Republican	January 4, 1909 – January 2, 1911	Los Angeles	
William E. Hinshaw	Republican	January 2, 1911 – January 6, 1913	Los Angeles	
Egbert J. Gates	Republican	January 6, 1913 – January 4, 1915	Los Angeles	
Henry W. Wright	Progressive	January 4, 1915 – January 8, 1923	Los Angeles	Ran as Republican for his 2nd term.
Henry W. Wright	Republican	January 4, 1915 – January 8, 1923	Los Angeles	Ran as Republican for his 2nd term.
Charles B. Dawson	Republican	January 8, 1923 – January 5, 1925	Los Angeles	
Jerome Valentine Scofield	Republican	January 5, 1925 – January 5, 1931	Los Angeles	
Harry F. Sewell	Republican	January 5, 1931 – January 2, 1933	Los Angeles	
Walter H. Sullivan	Democratic	January 2, 1933 – January 7, 1935	Los Angeles	
Amos Franklin Glover	Democratic	January 7, 1935 – January 4, 1937	Los Angeles	
Fred P. Glick	Democratic	January 4, 1937 – January 2, 1939	Los Angeles	
Ralph C. Dills	Democratic	January 2, 1939 – June 1, 1949	Los Angeles	Resigned from office to become a Justice on the Los Angeles County Municipal Court.
Vacant		June 1, 1949 – January 8, 1951	Los Angeles	
Carley V. Porter	Democratic	January 8, 1951 – January 7, 1963	Los Angeles	
William E. Dannemeyer	Democratic	January 7, 1963 – January 2, 1967	Orange	
Kenneth Cory	Democratic	January 2, 1967 – November 30, 1974	Orange	
John Briggs	Republican	December 2, 1974 – November 30, 1976	Orange	
William E. Dannemeyer	Republican	December 6, 1976 – November 30, 1978	Orange	
Ross Johnson	Republican	December 4, 1978 – November 30, 1982	Orange	
Nolan Frizzelle	Republican	December 6, 1982 – November 30, 1992	Orange	
Tom Umberg	Democratic	December 7, 1992 – November 30, 1994	Orange	
Jim Morrissey	Republican	December 5, 1994 – November 30, 1998	Orange	
Lou Correa	Democratic	December 7, 1998 – November 30, 2004	Orange	
Tom Umberg	Democratic	December 6, 2004 – November 30, 2006	Orange	
Jose Solorio	Democratic	December 4, 2006 – November 30, 2012	Orange	
Tom Daly	Democratic	December 3, 2012 – November 30, 2022	Orange	
Josh Lowenthal	Democratic	December 5, 2022 – present	Los Angeles	

== Election results (1990–present) ==
=== 2024 ===
2024 California State Assembly 69th district election
Primary election
Party	Candidate	Votes	%
Democratic	Josh Lowenthal (incumbent)	54,782	68.0
Republican	Joshua Rodriguez	25,755	32.0
Total votes		80,537	100.0
General election
Democratic	Josh Lowenthal (incumbent)	120,340	68.4
Republican	Joshua Rodriguez	55,595	31.6
Total votes		175,935	100.0
Democratic hold			

=== 2022 ===
2022 California State Assembly 69th district election
Primary election
Party	Candidate	Votes	%
Democratic	Josh Lowenthal	30,919	45.6
Democratic	Al Austin II	17,985	26.5
Democratic	Janet Denise Foster	12,790	18.9
Democratic	Merry Taheri	6,052	8.9
Total votes		67,746	100.0
General election
Democratic	Josh Lowenthal	62,582	58.9
Democratic	Al Austin II	43,686	41.1
Total votes		106,268	100.0
Democratic hold			

=== 2020 ===
2020 California State Assembly 69th district election
Primary election
Party	Candidate	Votes	%
Democratic	Tom Daly (incumbent)	44,015	73.9
Republican	Jon Paul White	15,555	26.1
Total votes		59,570	100.0
General election
Democratic	Tom Daly (incumbent)	99,731	72.9
Republican	Jon Paul White	37,065	27.1
Total votes		136,796	100.0
Democratic hold			

=== 2018 ===
2018 California State Assembly 69th district election
Primary election
Party	Candidate	Votes	%
Democratic	Tom Daly (incumbent)	30,411	99.7
Libertarian	Autumn Browne (write-in)	81	0.3
Total votes		30,492	100.0
General election
Democratic	Tom Daly (incumbent)	63,054	75.2
Libertarian	Autumn Browne	20,786	24.8
Total votes		83,840	100.0
Democratic hold			

=== 2016 ===
2016 California State Assembly 69th district election
Primary election
Party	Candidate	Votes	%
Democratic	Tom Daly (incumbent)	38,139	70.3
Republican	Ofelia Velarde-Garcia	16,125	29.7
Total votes		54,264	100.0
General election
Democratic	Tom Daly (incumbent)	69,640	68.3
Republican	Ofelia Velarde-Garcia	32,324	31.7
Total votes		101,964	100.0
Democratic hold			

=== 2014 ===
2014 California State Assembly 69th district election
Primary election
Party	Candidate	Votes	%
Democratic	Tom Daly (incumbent)	11,804	55.2
Republican	Sherry Walker	5,072	23.7
Republican	Cecilia "Ceci" Iglesias	4,489	21.0
Total votes		21,365	100.0
General election
Democratic	Tom Daly (incumbent)	32,332	67.4
Republican	Sherry Walker	15,665	32.6
Total votes		47,997	100.0
Democratic hold			

=== 2012 ===
2012 California State Assembly 69th district election
Primary election
Party	Candidate	Votes	%
Democratic	Tom Daly	10,939	39.2
Republican	Jose "Joe" Moreno	5,980	21.4
Democratic	Julio Perez	5,738	20.6
Democratic	Michele Martinez	4,651	16.7
Democratic	Francisco "Paco" Barragan	605	2.2
Total votes		27,913	100.0
General election
Democratic	Tom Daly	56,951	67.6
Republican	Jose "Joe" Moreno	27,354	32.4
Total votes		84,305	100.0
Democratic hold			

=== 2010 ===
2010 California State Assembly 69th district election
Party	Candidate	Votes	%
Democratic	Jose Solorio (incumbent)	36,436	65.5
Republican	Robert M. Hammond	19,273	34.5
Total votes		55,709	100.0
Democratic hold			

=== 2008 ===
2008 California State Assembly 69th district election
Party	Candidate	Votes	%
Democratic	Jose Solorio (incumbent)	50,809	71.0
Republican	Cameron Mangels	20,705	29.0
Total votes		71,514	100.0
Democratic hold			

=== 2006 ===
2006 California State Assembly 69th district election
Party	Candidate	Votes	%
Democratic	Jose Solorio	28,339	65.7
Republican	Ryan Gene Williams	14,854	34.3
Total votes		43,193	100.0
Democratic hold			

=== 2004 ===
2004 California State Assembly 69th district election
Party	Candidate	Votes	%
Democratic	Tom Umberg	38,516	61.4
Republican	Otto Bade	19,811	31.5
Libertarian	George Reis	4,470	7.1
Total votes		62,797	100.0
Democratic hold			

=== 2002 ===
2002 California State Assembly 69th district election
Party	Candidate	Votes	%
Democratic	Lou Correa (incumbent)	25,392	65.4
Republican	Reuben Ross	13,487	34.6
Total votes		38,879	100.0
Democratic hold			

=== 2000 ===
2000 California State Assembly 69th district election
Party	Candidate	Votes	%
Democratic	Lou Correa (incumbent)	36,581	63.3
Republican	Lou D. Lopez	17,323	30.0
Natural Law	Tuan D. Pham	3,862	6.7
Total votes		57,766	100.0
Democratic hold			

=== 1998 ===
1998 California State Assembly 69th district election
Party	Candidate	Votes	%
Democratic	Lou Correa	23,664	54.7
Republican	Jim Morrissey (incumbent)	18,323	42.4
Reform	Al Snook	639	1.5
Libertarian	Bolynda Schultz	620	1.4
Total votes		43,246	100.0
Democratic gain from Republican			

=== 1996 ===
1996 California State Assembly 69th district election
Party	Candidate	Votes	%
Republican	Jim Morrissey (incumbent)	24,545	48.1
Democratic	Lou Correa	24,452	47.9
Natural Law	Larry G. Engwall	2,010	3.9
Total votes		51,007	100.0
Republican hold			

=== 1994 ===
1994 California State Assembly 69th district election
Party	Candidate	Votes	%
Republican	Jim Morrissey	21,348	51.0
Democratic	Mike Metzler	18,558	44.4
Libertarian	George Reis	1,915	4.6
Total votes		41,821	100.0
Republican gain from Democratic			

=== 1992 ===
1992 California State Assembly 69th district election
Party	Candidate	Votes	%
Democratic	Tom Umberg (incumbent)	32,700	60.0
Republican	Jo Ellen Allen	18,560	34.1
Libertarian	David R. Keller	3,217	5.9
Total votes		54,477	100.0
Democratic gain from Republican			

=== 1990 ===
1990 California State Assembly 69th district election
Party	Candidate	Votes	%
Republican	Nolan Frizzelle (incumbent)	64,384	63.2
Democratic	Jim Toledano	37,458	36.8
Total votes		101,842	100.0
Republican hold			

== See also ==
- California State Assembly
- California State Assembly districts
- Districts in California
