= Richard T. Hanna =

American politician (1914–2001)

Richard Hanna
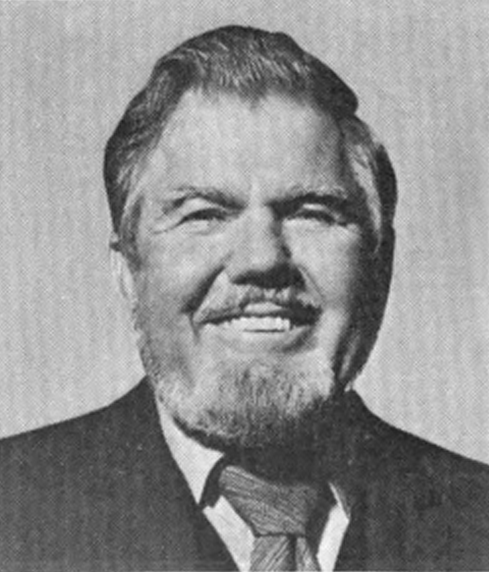

Member of the U.S. House of Representatives from California's 34th district
- In office January 3, 1963 – December 31, 1974
- Preceded by: Constituency established
- Succeeded by: Mark W. Hannaford

Member of the California State Assembly from the 75th district
- In office June 28, 1956 – January 3, 1963
- Preceded by: LeRoy Lyon
- Succeeded by: Victor Veysey

Personal details
- Born: Richard Thomas Hanna; June 9, 1914 Kemmerer, Wyoming, U.S.
- Died: June 9, 2001 (aged 87) Tryon, North Carolina, U.S.
- Party: Democratic
- Spouse: Doris Jenks
- Children: 3
- Education: Pasadena City College; University of California, Los Angeles (BA, LLB)

Military service
- Allegiance: United States
- Branch/service: United States Navy
- Battles/wars: World War II

Richard Thomas Hanna (June 9, 1914 – June 9, 2001) was an American lawyer and politician who served six terms as a U.S. representative from California from 1963 to 1974.

He became involved in a scandal dubbed Koreagate by accepting bribes from a businessman working for the South Korean government. He was found guilty, resigned his seat, and served one year in prison.

== History ==
Hanna was born in Kemmerer, Wyoming and graduated from Pasadena Junior College, Pasadena, California. He received his BA and LLB from the University of California, Los Angeles and then became a lawyer in private practice, after serving in the United States Naval Air Corps from 1942 to 1945.

== Career ==
Hanna served in the California State Assembly from 1956 to 1963.

=== Congress ===
He was elected as a Democrat to the Eighty-eighth United States Congress in 1962 and to the five succeeding Congresses (January 3, 1963 - December 31, 1974) to represent California's 34th congressional district, which then covered parts of Los Angeles and Orange counties.

== Koreagate ==
In the 1970s, he received payments of about $200,000 from Korean businessman Tongsun Park in what became known as the Koreagate influence buying scandal. After the payments were revealed, he pleaded guilty to conspiring to commit bribery and was sentenced to 6–30 months in federal prison, of which he served one year.

== Death ==
After his death on his 87th birthday, June 9, 2001, in Tryon, North Carolina, he was cremated and his ashes were scattered in the Atlantic Ocean, off the coast of North Carolina.

== Congressman electoral history ==
1962 United States House of Representatives elections in California
Party	Candidate	Votes	%
Democratic	Richard T. Hanna	90,758	55.9
Republican	Robert A. Geier	71,478	44.1
Total votes		162,236	100.0
Democratic win (new seat)			

1964 United States House of Representatives elections in California
Party	Candidate	Votes	%
Democratic	Richard T. Hanna (Incumbent)	137,588	58.3
Republican	Robert A. Geier	98,606	41.7
Total votes		236,194	100.0
Democratic hold			

1966 United States House of Representatives elections in California
Party	Candidate	Votes	%
Democratic	Richard T. Hanna (Incumbent)	127,976	55.8
Republican	Frank LaMagna	101,410	44.2
Total votes		129,386	100.0
Democratic hold			

1968 United States House of Representatives elections in California
Party	Candidate	Votes	%
Democratic	Richard T. Hanna (Incumbent)	105,880	50.9
Republican	Bill J. Teague	102,333	49.1
Total votes		208,213	100.0
Democratic hold			

1970 United States House of Representatives elections in California
Party	Candidate	Votes	%
Democratic	Richard T. Hanna (Incumbent)	101,664	54.5
Republican	Bill J. Teague	82,167	44.0
American Independent	Lee R. Rayburn	2,843	1.5
Total votes		186,674	100.0
Democratic hold			

1972 United States House of Representatives elections in California
Party	Candidate	Votes	%
Democratic	Richard T. Hanna (Incumbent)	113,841	67.2
Republican	John D. Ratterree	48,916	28.9
American Independent	Lee R. Rayburn	6,604	3.9
Total votes		169,361	100.0
Democratic hold			

== See also ==
- List of American federal politicians convicted of crimes
- List of federal political scandals in the United States

U.S. House of Representatives
New constituency	Member of the U.S. House of Representatives from California's 34th congressional district 1963–1974	Succeeded by Mark W. Hannaford
