= Arlo Smith =

American lawyer (1927–2025)

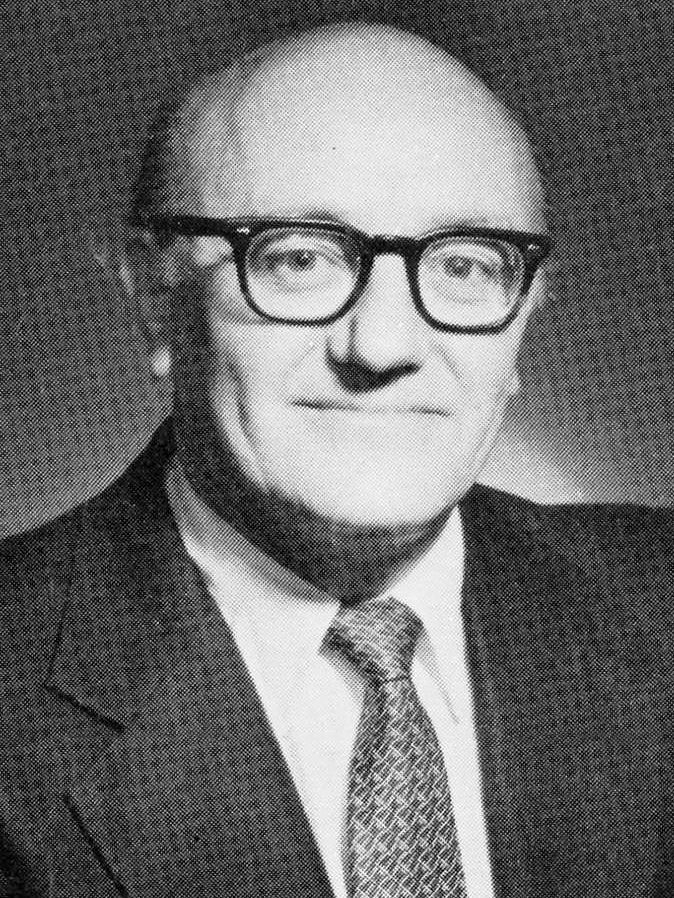
- Smith in 1982

25th District Attorney of San Francisco
- In office January 8, 1980 – January 8, 1996
- Preceded by: Joseph Freitas Jr.
- Succeeded by: Terence Hallinan

Personal details
- Born: October 9, 1927 Mankato, Minnesota, U.S.
- Died: October 2025 (aged 97–98) Sonoma, California, U.S.
- Party: Democratic
- Spouses: Helen Hale (died 1997); Jane Howell (died 2025)
- Children: 3
- Education: University of California, Berkeley

Arlo Eugene Smith (October 9, 1927 – October 8 or 9, 2025) (Note: Sources differed on whether he died on October 8, 2025, the day before he would have turned 98, or October 9, 2025, his birthday.) was an American lawyer who served as the District Attorney of San Francisco, California from 1980 to 1996. He was the Democratic candidate for attorney general of California in 1990, but lost to Dan Lungren.

== Background ==
Smith was born in Mankato, Minnesota, on October 9, 1927, and grew up in San Bernardino, California. He received his bachelor's degree and law degree from the University of California, Berkeley.

== Career ==
Following a 26-year career as a state prosecutor, Smith was elected San Francisco's district attorney in 1979; he defeated four major opponents in that election, including incumbent Joseph Freitas, whose reputation was damaged by his office's failure to secure murder convictions for Dan White for the Moscone–Milk assassinations.

He won three more terms in 1983, 1987, and 1991 without opposition, but in 1995, he was defeated for re-election, finishing third amid challenges from Terence Hallinan and Bill Fazio, the latter of whom was a prosecutor in Smith's office, and whom Smith fired after learning of his intention to run against him. Fazio ran a tough on crime campaign, while Hallinan took more liberal positions. Though Hallinan tied Fazio to Smith as an attack, Smith endorsed the ultimately victorious Hallinan in the subsequent runoff.

== Personal life and death ==
Smith was twice married. He had three children with his first wife, Helen Hale Smith, who died in 1997. He then married Jane Howell, and they were together until her death in May 2025. Smith died at a nursing home in Sonoma, California, in October 2025.

== Notes ==
Legal offices
| Preceded by Joseph Freitas | District Attorney of San Francisco; 1980–1996 | Succeeded by Terence Hallinan |
