= Dan Lungren =

American lawyer & politician (born 1946)

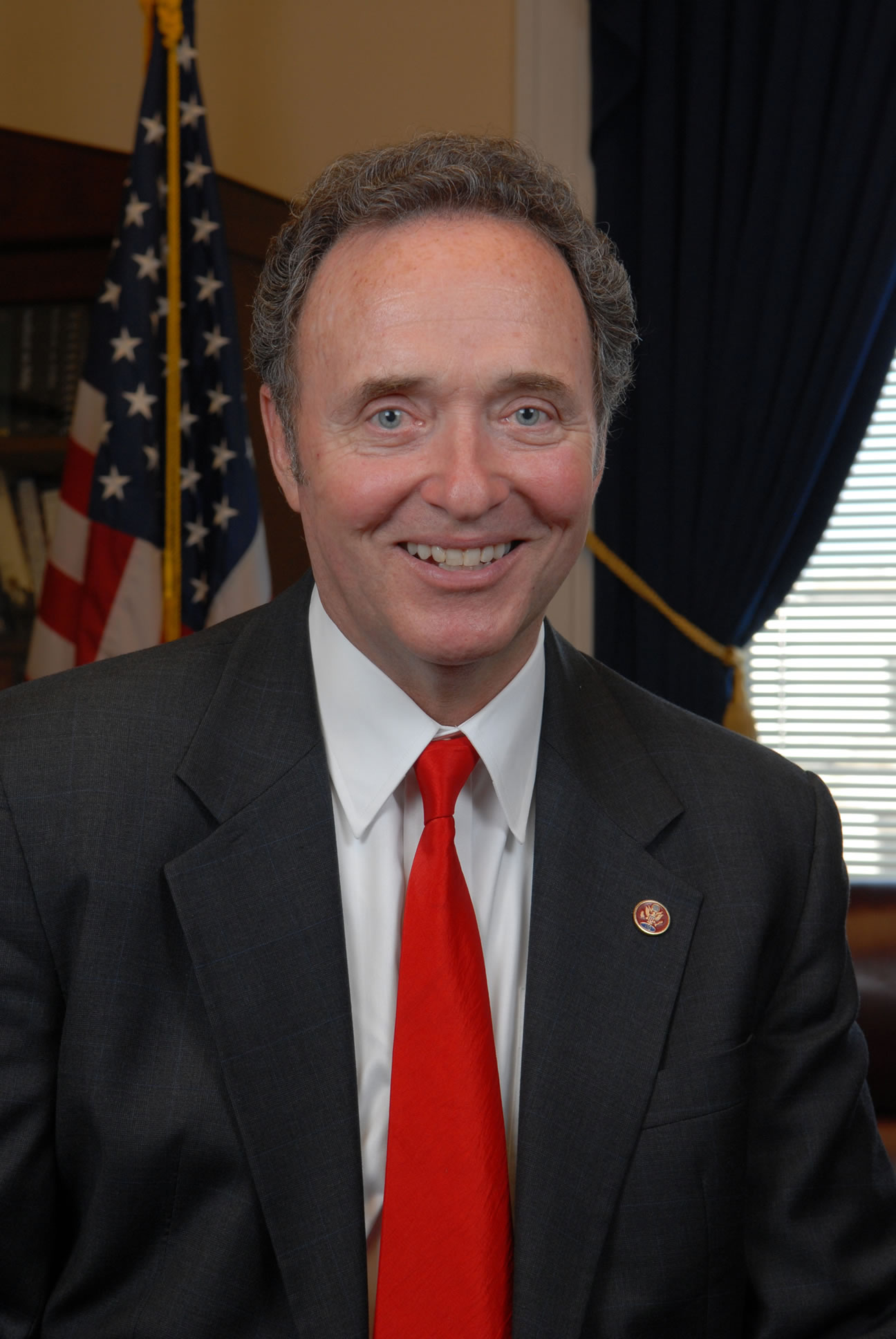
- Official portrait, 2009

Chair of the House Administration Committee
- In office January 3, 2011 – January 3, 2013
- Preceded by: Bob Brady
- Succeeded by: Candice Miller

Member of the U.S. House of Representatives from California
- In office January 3, 2005 – January 3, 2013
- Preceded by: Doug Ose
- Succeeded by: Ami Bera
- Constituency: 3rd district
- In office January 3, 1979 – January 3, 1989
- Preceded by: Mark W. Hannaford
- Succeeded by: Dana Rohrabacher
- Constituency: 34th district (1979–1983); 42nd district (1983–1989)

29th Attorney General of California
- In office January 7, 1991 – January 4, 1999
- Governor: Pete Wilson
- Preceded by: John Van de Kamp
- Succeeded by: Bill Lockyer

Personal details
- Born: Daniel Edward Lungren; September 22, 1946 (age 80) Long Beach, California, U.S.
- Party: Republican
- Spouse: Bobbi Kolls (m. 1969; died 2022)
- Children: 3
- Education: University of Notre Dame (BA); Georgetown University (JD)
- Lungren's voice Lungren on Rep. Jack Kemp's death. Recorded May 6, 2009

Daniel Edward Lungren (born September 22, 1946) is an American lawyer, lobbyist, and former politician. A native of Long Beach, California, his career as an elected official began when he was elected to the United States House of Representatives as a Republican, representing the Long Beach area from 1979 to 1989. He then served as attorney general of California from 1991 to 1999, and ran unsuccessfully for governor of California in 1998, losing to Democrat Gray Davis.

In 2005, he returned to Congress, representing California's 3rd congressional district, which covered most of Sacramento County, portions of Solano County, as well as all of Alpine County, Amador County and Calaveras County. In 2012, his seat was redistricted, and he sought re-election in California's 7th congressional district, losing to Democrat Ami Bera. As of 2026, Dan Lungren is the last Republican to serve as the Attorney General of California to date.

== Early life, education and private career ==
Daniel Edward Lungren was born in Long Beach, California, on September 22, 1946, to a family of Irish, Swedish and Scottish descent. From 1952, Lungren's father, John, was the personal physician to and a close friend of former President Richard Nixon.

Lungren graduated from St. Anthony High School in 1964 and matriculated to the University of Notre Dame, where he earned an A.B. degree with honors in English in 1968. He returned to California to chair Youth for Nixon during Nixon's first successful run for the presidency. He anticipated military service during the Vietnam War but was ruled ineligible due to a knee injury he sustained while playing football in high school.

Lungren began his legal studies at the University of Southern California Law School but transferred to Georgetown University Law Center, where he earned his J.D. degree in 1971. During his years at Georgetown, Lungren worked for Republican U.S. Senators George Murphy of California and Bill Brock of Tennessee. From 1971 to 1972, he was Special Assistant to the co-chair of the Republican National Committee (RNC); Lungren's wife, Bobbi, worked in the Nixon White House at the time. When Lungren returned to Long Beach, he joined a law firm and practiced civil law for a short time before running unsuccessfully for Congress in 1976. He was successful in 1978.

== U.S. House of Representatives (1979–1989) ==
Lungren first served in the House of Representatives from 1979 to 1989, representing portions of Long Beach and Orange County. Radley Balko wrote in 2012: "Lungren rose in stature with the election of Ronald Reagan in 1980, and quickly became a darling of the tough-on-crime crowd and the rising moral majority movement." He was one of Newt Gingrich's chief lieutenants during this time; he was a founding member of the Conservative Opportunity Society. He served on the House Judiciary Committee, where he pushed for "tough on crime" legislation. In 1984, Lungren sponsored the Comprehensive Crime Control Act, "at the time one of the most sweeping pieces of anti-crime legislation in U.S. history." In addition, he supported asset forfeiture as a weapon in the war on drugs, saying he wanted to "[m]ake it illegal for a dry cleaner or a grocery store to take money from a drug dealer (...) and if they do, seize the business. Put the merchant in jail."

Lungren also supported sanctions against employers who hired illegal immigrants, but also favored a temporary guest-worker program. He was the principal House cosponsor of the Simpson-Mazzoli immigration bill, which became the Immigration Reform Act of 1986. He also independently sponsored a "guest worker" bill, designed to allow for importation of "temporary" immigrant laborers.

== California statewide offices ==
In late 1987, California Governor George Deukmejian attempted to appoint Lungren to fill a vacancy in the office of California State Treasurer. The state Assembly confirmed Lungren's appointment, but the state Senate rejected it. Arguing that only one house of the Legislature needed to confirm him, Lungren took his case to the California Supreme Court; while pursuing this action, he did not seek re-election to the U.S. House. On June 23, 1988, the state Supreme Court ruled that both houses of the legislature had to confirm Lungren's appointment; he thus found himself out of a job in both Washington, D.C. and Sacramento.

Lungren was elected Attorney General of California in 1990 and re-elected in 1994. He ran as a staunch supporter of capital punishment, and in 1992, executions resumed in California after a 25-year pause, with a total of five occurring under his tenure. He also helped pass legislation such as "Megan's Law", "3-Strikes-and-You're-Out", "Sexual Anti-Predator Act" and the "California's Safe Schools Plan". He also sponsored a law allowing minors as young as 14 who are accused of murder to be tried as adults and "led a national effort to limit lawsuits filed by prisoners, which produced the federal Prison Litigation Reform Act of 1996." His 1993 letter to five major video game publishers and seven major video game retailers, asking them "to stop the manufacturing, licensing, distribution, or sale of any video game that portrays graphic and gratuitous violence", was called "the strongest anti-violence statement yet from a top government official" by the gaming press, even with Lungren's accompanying statement that he was strictly making an appeal to the companies' sense of civic responsibility and not calling for any form of government censorship. In 1996, he was considered as a possible vice presidential candidate to run with Republican nominee Bob Dole. That same year, Lungren "vigorously opposed" Proposition 215, which legalized medical marijuana in California.

In 1998, Lungren was the Republican candidate for governor of California, running against Democratic Lieutenant Governor Gray Davis. During the campaign, Davis maintained that Lungren, who presented himself as the political heir to former California Governor and U.S. President Ronald Reagan, was too conservative for California. Davis also criticized Lungren's hesitancy, as California Attorney General, to enforce laws restricting assault weapons and his waiting until the last minute to become part of a class action lawsuit against the cigarette industry. Lungren touted his crime policies and promoted the economic records of the two preceding Republican governors, George Deukmejian and Pete Wilson. On election day, Davis won with 57.9% of the vote, while Lungren got 38.4%.

== U.S. House of Representatives (2005–2013) ==
In 2004 Lungren was elected to California's 3rd congressional district, which included several rural and exurban areas east of Sacramento. He had moved to Gold River, a Sacramento suburb, in the 1990s.

Lungren was reappointed to the Judiciary Committee based on his previous five terms of seniority; he also served on the Homeland Security Committee. In 2005, Lungren supported the USA PATRIOT Act, which renewed the federal government's ability to perform secret surveillance including wiretaps of citizens and monitoring of public and private computer packet-switched networks to prevent terrorism from hitting the United States. In 2006, Lungren and fellow U.S. Representative Jane Harman authored the SAFE Port Act, which improves security at the ports including additional requirements for maritime facilities, foreign port assessments, container security initiatives and Customs Trade Partnership against Terrorism. The bill passed the House with bipartisan support. Also in 2006, he sponsored the "Streamlined Procedures Act" which "would strip federal courts of the power to review habeas corpus petitions in state death penalty cases." In 2007, Lungren was appointed to the House Administration Committee.

Lungren stated that he opposed "any bill brought to the floor of the House that includes an amnesty provision that confers citizenship status." He cited his concern as the millions of "legal immigrants who wait years in order to obtain permanent residence and citizenship." Lungren was an opponent of "the huge growth of spending earmarks." Described as a "maverick", he "cited the need for the party to adopt more fiscally conservative policies."

On July 29, 2008, the House of Representatives passed H.R. 6295, introduced by Lungren. This legislation was to stop the use of submersible and semi-submersible vessels used to transport drugs and other contraband that pose a threat to communities and national security. Shortly after the 2008 election, a newly reelected Lungren challenged John Boehner for House Minority Leader. Although Lungren did not win the post, Boehner appointed him as Ranking Member of the House Administration Committee. To serve in this new role, he left his seat on the Budget Committee. Lungren became Chairman of the House Administration Committee when Republicans took control of the House in January 2011. The Cook Political Report by the National Journal named Lungren the Republican most vulnerable to redistricting in 2012.

Lungren lost his reelection bid for California's 7th congressional district, reapportioned after the 2010 United States census, in the November 2012 election, won by the Democratic challenger, Ami Bera, by a margin of 5,700 votes – 51.1% to 48.9%.

=== Committee assignments ===
- Committee on House Administration (Chair)
- Committee on the Judiciary
  - Subcommittee on Crime, Terrorism, and Homeland Security
  - Subcommittee on Immigration Policy and Enforcement
  - Task Force on Judicial Impeachment
- Committee on Homeland Security
  - Subcommittee on Transportation Security
  - Subcommittee on Cybersecurity, Infrastructure Protection, and Security Technologies (Chairman)
- Joint Committee on Printing
- Joint Committee on the Library
- Republican Study Committee

== Political campaigns ==
=== 2004 ===
Lungren ran for Congress again in the 3rd congressional district after six-year incumbent U.S. Representative Doug Ose announced his retirement. Lungren stated that his desire to serve in Congress again was rekindled by the September 11 attacks. He won a come from behind victory in a three-way primary against Mary Ose (sister of Doug) and State Senator Rico Oller in 2004.

=== 2010 ===
Lungren was challenged by Democratic nominee Ami Bera, a physician by occupation, American Independent Jerry Leidecker, Peace and Freedom nominee Mike Roskey and Libertarian Douglas Arthur Tuma. Lungren was reelected with 50.6% of the vote, with Bera accumulating 42.7% and 6.7% for other candidates.

=== 2012 ===
After the 2010 U.S. Census, Lungren's district was renumbered as the 7th district. It lost all of its territory outside Sacramento County and had a more evenly divided registration of Republicans and Democrats than its predecessor. He again faced Democrat Ami Bera in the November general election. With the 7th seen as a swing district, the race was described as a potential "PAC Battlefield". In one of the most-watched House races nationally, both sides poured in millions of dollars for their campaigns. Bera was ultimately elected to the seat, with 51.7% of the vote to Lungren's 48.3%

== Later career ==
After leaving Congress, Lungren co-founded the lobbying firm Lungren Lopina LLC. In 2018, he joined the law firm King & Spalding, working from their offices in Washington, San Francisco, and Los Angeles.

== Personal life ==
In 1969, Lungren married Bobbi Kolls, with whom he had three children. The couple resided in Alexandria, Virginia, at the time of her death in 2022. He is Catholic.

== Electoral history ==
Dan Lungren electoral history

United States House of Representatives elections, 1976
Party	Candidate	Votes	%
Democratic	Mark W. Hannaford (incumbent)	100,988	50.7
Republican	Dan Lungren	98,147	49.3
Total votes		199,135	100.0
Turnout			
Democratic hold			

United States House of Representatives elections, 1978
Party	Candidate	Votes	%
Republican	Dan Lungren	90,554	53.7
Democratic	Mark W. Hannaford (incumbent)	73,608	43.7
American Independent	Lawrence John Stafford	4,410	2.6
Total votes		168,572	100.0
Turnout			
Republican gain from Democratic			

United States House of Representatives elections, 1980
Party	Candidate	Votes	%
Republican	Dan Lungren (incumbent)	138,024	71.8
Democratic	Simone	46,351	24.1
Peace and Freedom	John S. Donohue	7,794	4.1
Total votes		192,169	100.0
Turnout			
Republican hold			

United States House of Representatives elections, 1982
Party	Candidate	Votes	%
Republican	Dan Lungren (incumbent)	142,845	69.0
Democratic	James P. Spellman	58,690	28.3
Peace and Freedom	John S. Donohue	5,514	2.7
Total votes		207,049	100.0
Turnout			
Republican hold			

United States House of Representatives elections, 1984
Party	Candidate	Votes	%
Republican	Dan Lungren (incumbent)	177,783	73.0
Democratic	Mary Lou Brophy	60,025	24.6
Peace and Freedom	John S. Donohue	5,811	2.4
Total votes		243,619	100.0
Turnout			
Republican hold			

United States House of Representatives elections, 1986
Party	Candidate	Votes	%
Republican	Dan Lungren (incumbent)	140,364	72.8
Democratic	Michael P. Blackburn	47,586	24.7
Peace and Freedom	Kate McClatchy	4,761	2.5
Total votes		192,711	100.0
Turnout			
Republican hold			

California Attorney General election, 1990
Party	Candidate	Votes	%
Republican	Dan Lungren	3,407,927	46.8
Democratic	Arlo Smith	3,379,021	46.4
Libertarian	Paul N. Gautreau	256,378	3.5
Peace and Freedom	Robert J. Evans	242,871	3.3
Total votes		7,286,197	100.0
Turnout			
Republican gain from Democratic			

California Attorney General election, 1994
Party	Candidate	Votes	%
Republican	Dan Lungren (incumbent)	4,363,760	54.0
Democratic	Tom Umberg	3,189,836	39.4
Libertarian	Richard Burns	275,265	3.4
Peace and Freedom	Robert J. Evans	259,073	3.2
Total votes		8,087,934	100.0
Turnout			
Republican hold			

California gubernatorial election, 1998
Party	Candidate	Votes	%
Democratic	Gray Davis	4,860,702	58.0
Republican	Dan Lungren	3,218,030	38.4
Green	Dan Hamburg	104,179	1.2
Libertarian	Steve Kubby	73,845	0.9
Peace and Freedom	Gloria La Riva	59,218	0.7
American Independent	Nathan Johnson	37,964	0.4
Natural Law	Harold H. Bloomfield	31,237	0.4
Total votes		8,385,175	100.0
Turnout			
Democratic gain from Republican			

United States House of Representatives elections, 2004
Party	Candidate	Votes	%
Republican	Dan Lungren	177,738	62.0
Democratic	Gabe Castillo	100,025	34.8
Libertarian	Douglas Arthur Tuma	9,310	3.2
Total votes		287,073	100.0
Turnout			
Republican hold			

United States House of Representatives elections, 2006
Party	Candidate	Votes	%
Republican	Dan Lungren (incumbent)	135,709	59.5
Democratic	Bill Durston	86,318	37.9
Libertarian	Douglas Arthur Tuma	3,772	1.6
Peace and Freedom	Michael Roskey	2,370	1.0
Total votes		228,169	100.0
Turnout			
Republican hold			

United States House of Representatives elections, 2008
Party	Candidate	Votes	%
Republican	Dan Lungren (incumbent)	155,424	49.5
Democratic	Bill Durston	137,971	44.0
Peace and Freedom	Dina J. Padilla	13,378	4.2
Libertarian	Douglas Arthur Tuma	7,273	2.3
Total votes		314,046	100.0
Turnout			
Republican hold			

United States House of Representatives elections, 2010
Party	Candidate	Votes	%
Republican	Dan Lungren (incumbent)	131,169	50.1
Democratic	Ami Bera	113,128	43.2
American Independent	Jerry L. Leidecker	6,577	2.5
Libertarian	Douglas Arthur Tuma	6,275	2.4
Peace and Freedom	Mike Roskey	4,789	1.8
Total votes		261,938	100.0
Republican hold			

United States House of Representatives elections, 2012
Party	Candidate	Votes	%
Democratic	Ami Bera	141,241	51.7
Republican	Dan Lungren (incumbent)	132,050	48.3
Total votes		273,291	100.0
Democratic gain from Republican			

U.S. House of Representatives
Preceded by Mark Hannaford	Member of the U.S. House of Representatives from California's 34th congressional district 1979–1983	Succeeded by Esteban Torres
Preceded by Duncan Hunter	Member of the U.S. House of Representatives from California's 42nd congressional district 1983–1989	Succeeded by Dana Rohrabacher
Preceded by Doug Ose	Member of the U.S. House of Representatives from California's 3rd congressional district 2005–2013	Succeeded by John Garamendi
Preceded by Vern Ehlers	Ranking Member of the House Administration Committee; 2009–2011	Succeeded by Bob Brady
Preceded by Bob Brady	Chair of the House Administration Committee; 2011–2013	Succeeded by Candice Miller
Legal offices
Preceded by John Van de Kamp	Attorney General of California; 1991–1999	Succeeded by Bill Lockyer
Party political offices
Preceded by Pete Wilson	Republican nominee for Governor of California; 1998	Succeeded by Bill Simon
U.S. order of precedence (ceremonial)
Preceded by Bob Dornan as Former U.S. Representative	Order of precedence of the United States as Former U.S. Representative	Succeeded by Ron Packard as Former U.S. Representative
