= 1990 California Attorney General election =

- November 6, 1990

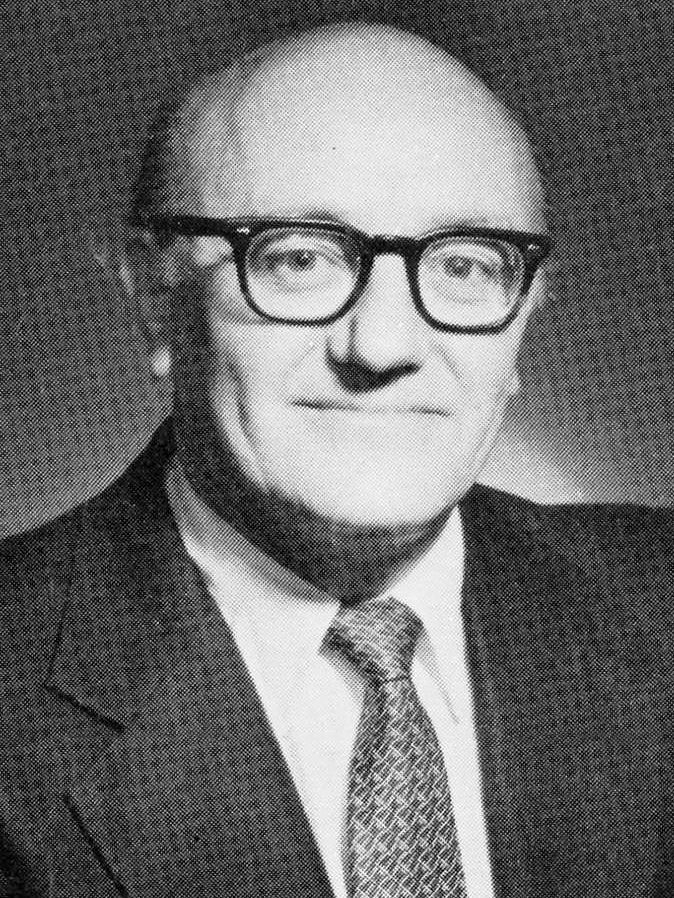
Nominee	Dan Lungren	Arlo Smith
Party	Republican	Democratic
Popular vote	3,407,927	3,379,021
Percentage	46.8%	46.4%
- County results Lungren: 40–50% 50–60% 60–70% Smith: 40–50% 50–60% 60–70% 70–80%
Attorney General before election
John Van de Kamp
Democratic
Elected Attorney General
Dan Lungren
Republican

The 1990 California Attorney General election was held on November 6, 1990. Republican nominee Dan Lungren narrowly defeated Democratic nominee Arlo Smith with 46.77% of the vote.

== Primary elections ==
Primary elections were held on June 5, 1990.

=== Democratic primary ===
==== Candidates ====
- Arlo Smith, District Attorney of San Francisco
- Ira Reiner, Los Angeles County District Attorney

==== Results ====
Democratic primary results
Party	Candidate	Votes	%
Democratic	Arlo Smith	1,229,924	51.97
Democratic	Ira Reiner	1,136,526	48.03
Total votes		2,366,450	100.00

=== Republican primary ===
==== Candidates ====
- Dan Lungren, former U.S. Representative

==== Results ====
Republican primary results
Party	Candidate	Votes	%
Republican	Dan Lungren	1,729,429	100.00
Total votes		1,729,429	100.00

== General election ==
=== Candidates ===
Major party candidates

- Dan Lungren, Republican
- Arlo Smith, Democratic

Other candidates

- Paul N. Gautreau, Libertarian
- Robert J. Evans, Peace and Freedom

=== Results ===
1990 California Attorney General election
Party	Candidate	Votes	%	±%
Republican	Dan Lungren	3,407,927	46.77%	
Democratic	Arlo Smith	3,379,021	46.38%	
Libertarian	Paul N. Gautreau	256,378	3.52%	
Peace and Freedom	Robert J. Evans	242,871	3.33%	
Majority		28,906		
Turnout		7,286,197		
Republican gain from Democratic		Swing		
