= Mark W. Hannaford =

American politician (1925–1985)

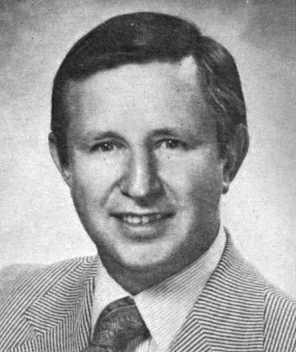

Member of the U.S. House of Representatives from California's 34th district
- In office January 3, 1975 – January 3, 1979
- Preceded by: Richard T. Hanna
- Succeeded by: Dan Lungren

Personal details
- Born: February 7, 1925 Woodrow, Colorado, US
- Died: June 2, 1985 (aged 60) Lakewood, California, US
- Party: Democratic Party
- Spouse: Sara Jane Lemaster (m. 1948)
- Children: 3
- Education: Ball State University (B.A. 1950; M.A. 1956)
- Profession: College professor

Mark Warren Hannaford (February 7, 1925 – June 2, 1985) was an American educator and World War II veteran who served two terms as a U.S. representative from California from 1975 to 1979.

== Background ==
Born in Woodrow, Colorado, Hannaford attended public schools in Anderson, Indiana. He received two degrees from Ball State University in Muncie, Indiana: a B.A. in 1950 and an M.A. in 1956.

He served in the United States Army Air Corps during World War II, serving four years in total from 1943 to 1946. Later, he attended Yale University on a John Hay Fellowship from 1961 to 1962. He was an associate professor of political science at Long Beach City College from 1966 to 1974.

== Political career ==
Hannaford entered politics when he served on the city council of Lakewood, California, from 1966 to 1975. He was the mayor of Lakewood from 1968 to 1970 and from 1972 to 1974. He was also a member of the California State Democratic Central Committee from 1966 to 1974 and was a delegate to the 1968 Democratic National Convention.

Hannaford was elected as a Democrat to the Ninety-fourth and to the Ninety-fifth Congresses (January 3, 1975–January 3, 1979). He lost re-election in 1978 and unsuccessfully sought another term in 1980. He was an assistant secretary of commerce during the presidency of Jimmy Carter and later worked in banking.

== Personal life and death ==
In 1948, Hannaford married Sara Jane Lemaster, and they had three children. He died from cancer at a hospital in Lakewood, California, on June 2, 1985, aged 60.

== Electoral history ==
1974 United States House of Representatives elections in California
Party	Candidate	Votes	%
Democratic	Mark W. Hannaford (Incumbent)	78,345	49.8
Republican	Bill Bond	72,967	46.3
American Independent	James Manis	3,169	2.0
Peace and Freedom	John S. Donohue	3,043	1.9
Total votes		157,524	100.0
Democratic hold			

1976 United States House of Representatives elections in California
Party	Candidate	Votes	%
Democratic	Mark W. Hannaford (Incumbent)	100,988	50.7
Republican	Dan Lungren	98,147	49.3
Total votes		199,135	100.0
Democratic hold			

1978 United States House of Representatives elections in California
Party	Candidate	Votes	%
Republican	Dan Lungren	90,554	53.7
Democratic	Mark W. Hannaford (Incumbent)	73,608	43.7
American Independent	Lawrence John Stafford	4,410	2.6
Total votes		168,572	100.0
Republican gain from Democratic			

Democratic primary results, California's 31st congressional district, June 3, 1980
Party	Candidate	Votes	%
Democratic	Mervyn Dymally	29,916	49.1
Democratic	Mark W. Hannaford	14,512	23.8
Democratic	Charles H. Wilson (incumbent)	9,320	15.3
Democratic	Bradford E. "Happy" Henschel	4,953	8.1
Democratic	Emanuel Gary Jr.	2,239	3.7
Total votes		60,940	100.0

U.S. House of Representatives
Preceded by Richard T. Hanna	Member of the U.S. House of Representatives from California's 34th congressional district 1975-1979	Succeeded by Dan Lungren
