= Lou Correa =

American politician (born 1958)

Lou J. Correa
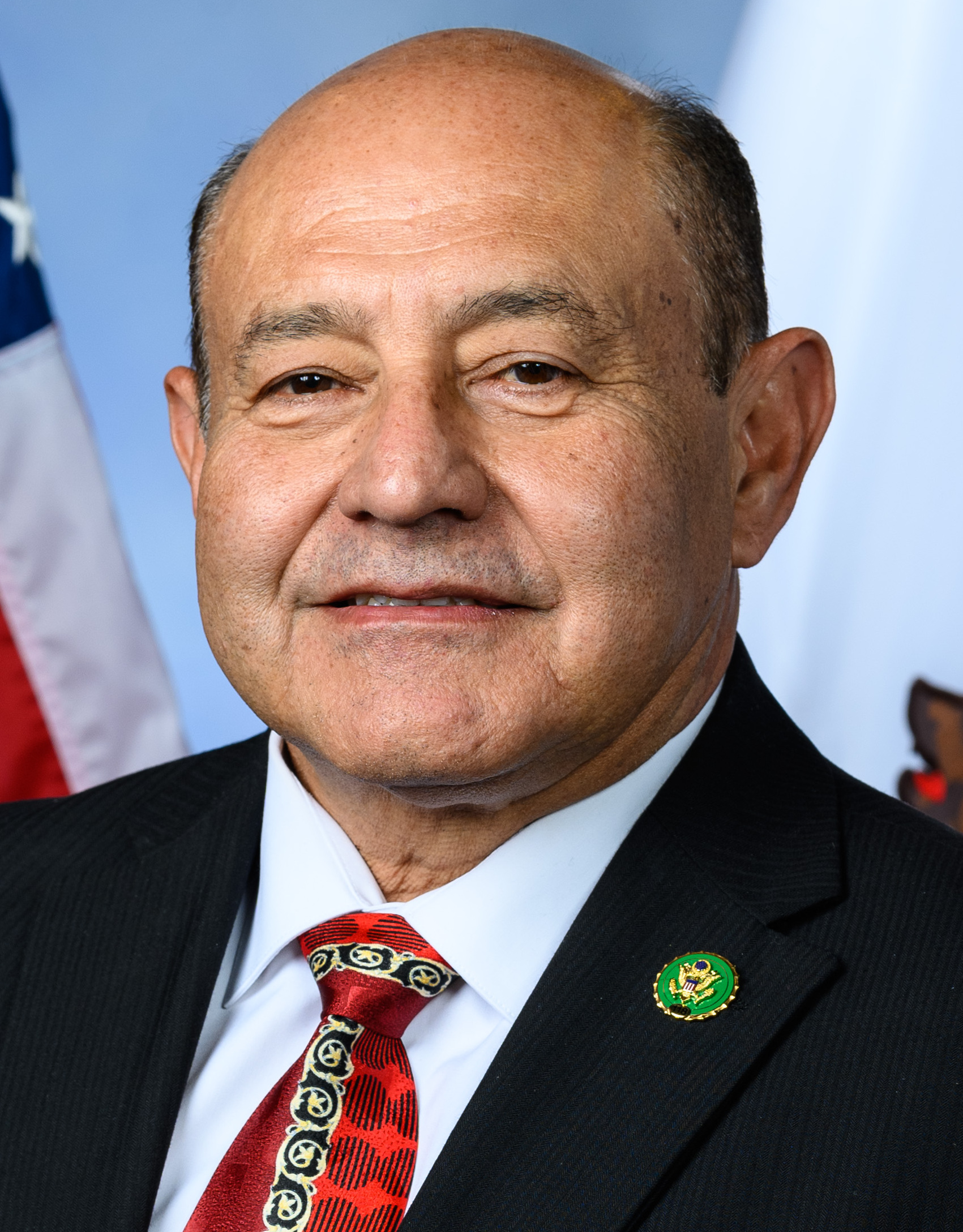
- Official portrait, 2023

Member of the U.S. House of Representatives from California's 46th district
- Incumbent
- Assumed office January 3, 2017
- Preceded by: Loretta Sánchez

Member of the California State Senate from the 34th district
- In office December 4, 2006 – December 1, 2014
- Preceded by: Joe Dunn
- Succeeded by: Janet Nguyen

Member of the Orange County Board of Supervisors from the 1st district
- In office January 3, 2005 – December 4, 2006
- Preceded by: Charles V. Smith
- Succeeded by: Janet Nguyen

Member of the California State Assembly from the 69th district
- In office December 7, 1998 – December 6, 2004
- Preceded by: Jim Morrissey
- Succeeded by: Tom Umberg

Personal details
- Born: Jose Luis Correa; January 24, 1958 (age 68) East Los Angeles, California, U.S.
- Party: Democratic
- Spouse: Esther Correa (m. 1990)
- Children: 4
- Education: California State University, Fullerton (BA); University of California, Los Angeles (JD, MBA)
- Website: House website Campaign website
- Correa's voice Correa supporting the 2022 Veteran Service Recognition Act; Recorded December 6, 2022

Jose Luis Correa (/kəˈreɪə/ kə-RAY-ə; born January 24, 1958) is an American businessman and politician serving as the U.S. representative for California's 46th congressional district since 2017. His district serves most of the majority-Hispanic areas of Orange County and includes most of Anaheim, all of Santa Ana, and parts of Orange. A member of the Democratic Party, Correa represented the 34th district in the California State Senate from 2006 to 2014.

Before his career in politics, Correa was an investment banker, a real estate broker, and a college instructor.

== Early life and education ==
Correa's paternal grandfather came to the United States from Mexico to work for the Southern Pacific Transportation Company in the 1910s. His grandfather settled down in the U.S. and started a family. During the Great Depression, he returned to Mexico with his American-born children. Years later, Correa's father got married and moved from Mexico to California.

Correa was born in East Los Angeles. His mother was killed in a car accident in Mexico when he was two. This resulted in Correa and his father moving to Zacatecas, Mexico. Five years later, he and his father moved to the Penguin City neighborhood in Anaheim, California. Correa's family unit comprised his father, Correa's sister, and an aunt he called "mom." Correa's father worked at a cardboard factory. His aunt cleaned hotel rooms making $1.50 an hour. The family moved regularly due to the cost of rent.

Correa started second grade speaking only Spanish. He struggled to learn English initially, but became fluent over time. He graduated from Anaheim High School and earned a Bachelor of Arts degree in economics from California State University, Fullerton and a Juris Doctor and Master of Business Administration from the University of California, Los Angeles.

== California legislature ==
=== State Assembly ===
Correa's political career began in 1996 when he ran for the California State Assembly as the Democratic nominee in the 69th Assembly district. He lost to Republican incumbent Jim Morrissey by just 93 votes. In a 1998 rematch, Correa was elected to the Assembly, defeating Morrissey 54% to 43%.

While a member of the Assembly, Correa served on several committees and chaired the Committee on Business and Professions, the Public Employees, Retirement and Social Security Committee; the Select Committee on Mobile Homes; and the Select Committee on MCAS El Toro Reuse.

Correa was reelected to the Assembly twice but was forced from office by California's term limits law, which restricted members from serving more than three two-year terms.

In 2004, Correa was elected to the Orange County Board of Supervisors, becoming the first Democrat to serve on the board since 1987. He represented the first district, which includes the cities of Garden Grove, Santa Ana, and Westminster as well as unincorporated areas of the county including Midway City.

=== State Senate ===
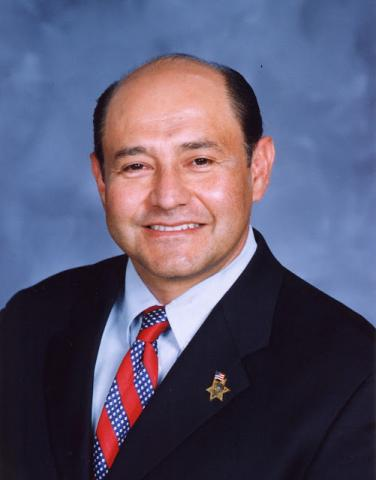
Correa during his time in the state Senate

In January 2006, Correa entered the race for the Democratic Party nomination for the California State Senate 34th district, a seat vacated by termed-out State Senator Joe Dunn.

After defeating Assemblyman Tom Umberg in the June primary, Correa defeated Republican Assemblywoman Lynn Daucher in the November general election by a margin of 1,392 votes. He was sworn into the State Senate on December 4, 2006.

In 2010, Correa was reelected over Anaheim City Councilwoman Lucille Kring.

In a January 27, 2015, special election, Correa ran for the Orange County Board of Supervisors, but was defeated by former Garden Grove City Councilman Andrew Do by a margin of 43 votes (0.1%).

== U.S. House of Representatives ==
=== Elections ===
==== 2016 ====
Correa ran for the United States Congress for the 46th district, which was being vacated by 10-term incumbent Loretta Sanchez, who was running for United States Senate. He came in first in the June 7 primary with 43.7% of the vote, and won the general election against Democrat Bao Nguyen, who earned 14.6% of the vote in the top-two primary, with 69.9% of the vote.

=== Tenure ===
Correa was a member of the Blue Dog Coalition. He left the caucus after a disagreement over the group's rebranding.

On July 29, 2024, Correa was announced as one of six Democratic members of a bipartisan task force investigating the attempted assassination of Donald Trump.

On June 12, 2025, Correa was one of the four Democrats who did not vote on the $9 billion spending cuts put forward by the Department of Government Efficiency; house Republicans passed the rescission package by 2 votes.

On November 10, 2026, Correa missed the House vote on the impeachment of Pete Hegseth as Secretary of Defense. Correa claimed he was recovering from a medical procedure.

==== January 6 U.S. Capitol attack ====
Correa was participating in the certification of the 2021 United States Electoral College vote count when supporters of outgoing President Donald Trump stormed the United States Capitol. He was in the House Chamber when rioters tried to break through the chamber doors. He hid in the gallery with other Congress members, holding a gas mask in case of tear gas. He said the rioters "have been misled by this crazy, tyrant president who keeps saying it was stolen from him when it wasn’t."

A group of approximately 20 Trump supporters harassed Correa at Dulles International Airport as he was leaving Washington to return to Orange County after certifying the electoral votes. People called him names and one man told him, "Your lie has been exposed. This not a democracy. It is a republic." After one woman told him to "go to work in China", Correa responded, "Maybe Russia is better. Comrade! Comrade!" Minutes later, airport police dispersed the crowd. Correa expressed concern that the airport police did not question or detain the harassers. He supported efforts to impeach Trump and called on Vice President Mike Pence to invoke the Twenty-fifth Amendment to the United States Constitution.

=== Committee assignments ===
For the 119th Congress:

- Committee on Homeland Security
  - Subcommittee on Border Security and Enforcement (Ranking Member)
  - Subcommittee on Counterterrorism, Law Enforcement, and Intelligence
- Committee on the Judiciary
  - Subcommittee on Immigration Integrity, Security, and Enforcement
  - Subcommittee on the Administrative State, Regulatory Reform, and Antitrust

=== Caucus memberships ===
- Congressional Arts Caucus
- Congressional Equality Caucus
- Black Maternal Health Caucus
- New Democrat Coalition
- House Baltic Caucus
- Congressional Hispanic Caucus
- Congressional Asian Pacific American Caucus
- Blue Collar Caucus
- Problem Solvers Caucus (Former)
- Psychedelics Advancing Therapies Caucus

== Political positions ==
=== Abortion ===
Correa has a 100% rating from NARAL Pro-Choice America and an F grade from the Susan B. Anthony List for his abortion-relating voting history. He opposed the overturning of Roe v. Wade, saying: "By preventing women from having access to health care, we are putting their lives in jeopardy. The decision should be left to woman, her doctor, and her god."

=== Antitrust ===
In 2022, Correa was one of 16 Democrats to vote against the Merger Filing Fee Modernization Act of 2022, an antitrust package that would crack down on corporations for anti-competitive behavior.

=== Surveillance ===
In January 2026, Correa one of 4 Democrats who voted to block funding for federally driven “kill switch” vehicle technology, which could monitor drivers and intervene in vehicle operation.

== Personal life ==
In 1990, Correa married his wife, Esther. They lived in Anaheim with Correa's father until Correa was in his 40s. Correa lives in Santa Ana, California. He and his wife have four children, one of whom, Adan, has autism and is a cast member on the Netflix series Love on the Spectrum. In November 2026, shortly after winning his sixth term, Correa suffered a heart attack and subsequently missed a vote on the impeachment of Defense secretary Pete Hegseth, which failed narrowly, due to emergency heart surgery.

== Electoral history ==
2016 United States House of Representatives elections in California
Party	Candidate	Votes	%
Democratic	Lou Correa	115,248	70.0
Democratic	Bao Nguyen	49,345	30.0
Total votes		164,593	100.0
Democratic hold			

2018 United States House of Representatives elections in California
Party	Candidate	Votes	%
Democratic	Lou Correa (Incumbent)	102,278	69.1
Republican	Russell Rene Lambert	45,638	30.9
Total votes		147,916	100.0
Democratic hold			

2020 United States House of Representatives elections in California
Party	Candidate	Votes	%
Democratic	Lou Correa (incumbent)	157,803	68.8
Republican	James S. Waters	71,716	31.2
Total votes		229,519	100.0
Democratic hold			

2022 United States House of Representatives elections in California
Party	Candidate	Votes	%
Democratic	Lou Correa (incumbent)	78,041	61.8
Republican	Christopher Gonzales	48,257	38.2
Total votes		126,298	100.0
Democratic hold			

2024 United States House of Representatives elections in California
Party	Candidate	Votes	%
Democratic	Lou Correa (incumbent)	134,103	63.4
Republican	David Pan	77,279	36.6
Total votes		211,292	100.0
Democratic hold			

== See also ==
- List of Hispanic and Latino Americans in the United States Congress

U.S. House of Representatives
Preceded by Loretta Sanchez	Member of the U.S. House of Representatives from California's 46th congressional district 2017–present	Incumbent
Party political offices
Preceded by Henry Cuellar	Chair of the Blue Dog Coalition for Communications; 2019–2021; Served alongside: Stephanie Murphy (Administration), Tom O'Halleran (Policy)	Succeeded by Tom O'Halleran
Preceded by Mary Peltola	Chair of the Blue Dog Coalition for Policy; 2025–present Served alongside: Marie Gluesenkamp Perez (Administration), Vicente Gonzalez (Communications)	Incumbent
U.S. order of precedence (ceremonial)
Preceded by Salud Carbajal	Seniority in the U.S. House of Representatives; 161st	Succeeded by Neal Dunn
