= Tom Daly (American politician) =

American politician

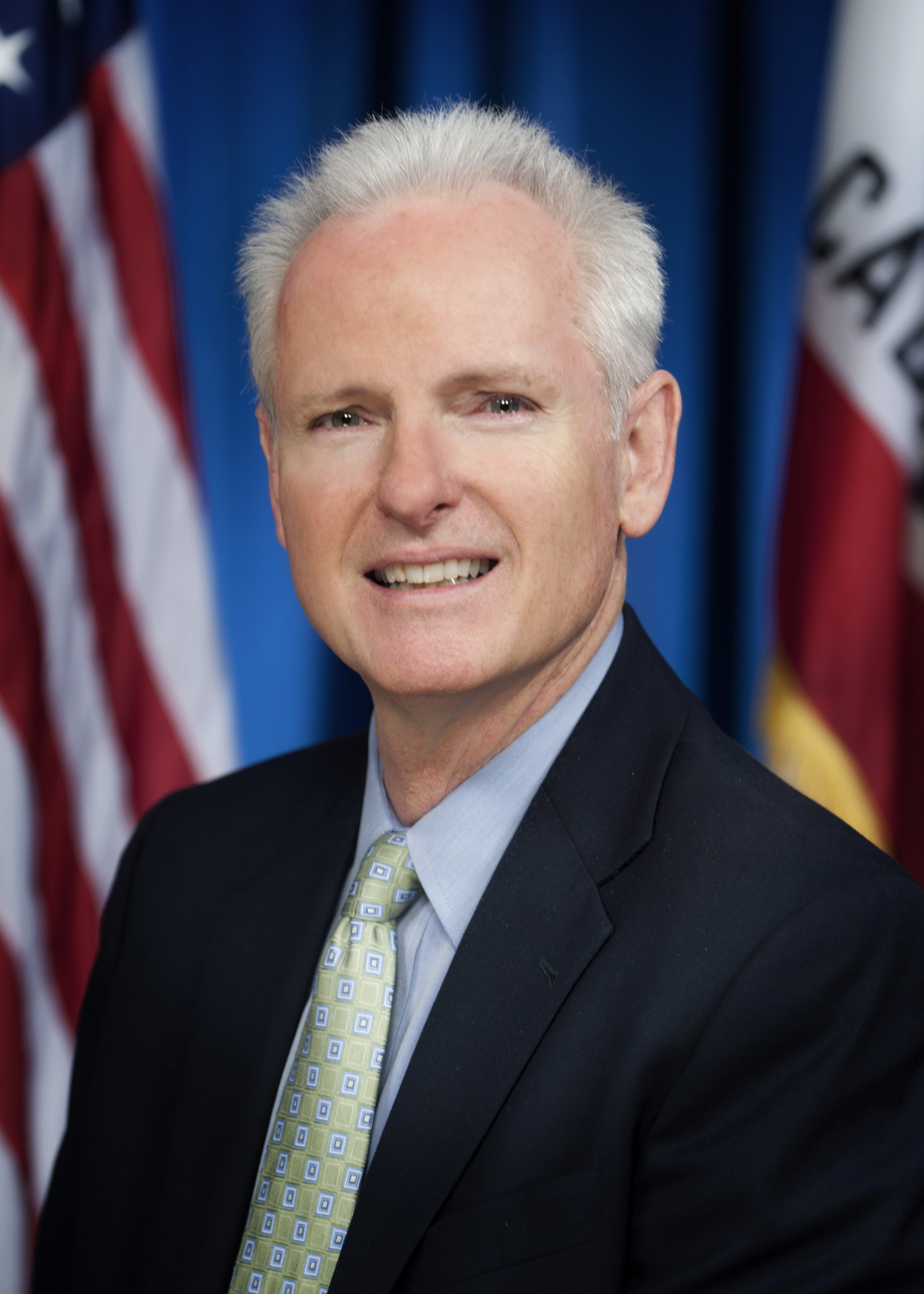
- Official portrait, 2012

Member of the California State Assembly from the 69th district
- In office December 3, 2012 – December 5, 2022
- Preceded by: Jose Solorio
- Succeeded by: Josh Lowenthal (redistricted)

Clerk-Recorder of Orange County
- In office December 17, 2002 – December 3, 2012
- Preceded by: Gary Granville
- Succeeded by: Hugh Nguyen

43rd Mayor of Anaheim
- In office November 17, 1992 – December 3, 2002
- Preceded by: Fred Hunter
- Succeeded by: Curt Pringle

Member of the Anaheim City Council
- In office November 29, 1988 – November 29, 1994
- Preceded by: Ben Bay
- Succeeded by: Tom Tait

Personal details
- Born: July 26, 1954 (age 72) Anaheim, California, U.S.
- Party: Democratic
- Spouse: Debbie
- Children: 3
- Education: Harvard University
- Occupation: Politician

Tom Daly (born July 26, 1954) is an American politician who served in the California State Assembly. He is a Democrat who represented the 69th Assembly District, which encompassed central Orange County, including the cities of Santa Ana, Anaheim, Garden Grove, and Orange.

Prior to being elected to the Assembly in 2012, Daly served as Orange County Clerk-Recorder, as well as Mayor of Anaheim. He first sought elected office in 1986 for the Anaheim Union High School District.

== Early life and career ==
A native of Orange County, Daly was born and raised in Anaheim. He attended four local schools, starting in kindergarten at Lincoln Elementary, then moving on to St. Anthony Claret's, Sycamore Junior High, and Anaheim High.

Daly's father was a longtime Latin and English teacher at Anaheim High School. Both his parents were active in civic affairs, providing Daly's introduction to local politics.

As a child, Daly was an All-Star player in the North Anaheim Little League. In high school, Daly went on to play on the Anaheim High Varsity Baseball team, producing one of the leading records among Orange County pitchers.

From his roots in Anaheim, Daly went on to receive his Bachelor of Arts degree from Harvard University in 1976.

After graduating from Harvard University and returning to Anaheim, Daly served as an aide for Orange County Supervisor Ralph Clark for eight years. A Democratic leader in a Republican-dominated county, Supervisor Clark was elected to four terms on the Orange County Board of Supervisors after serving on the Anaheim City Council and Mayor of Anaheim.

Daly first sought elective office in 1986, winning election to the board of trustees of the Anaheim Union High School District. Daly went on to run for Anaheim City Council in 1988 and then he was elected mayor in 1992.

Daly still lives in Anaheim. He is married and has three children.

== Mayor of Anaheim (1992-2002) ==
From 1992-2002, Daly served as the directly elected mayor of the City of Anaheim, the tenth largest city in California.

=== Elections ===
In the 1992 Mayoral election, Daly defeated then-Mayor Fred Hunter by a margin of 57% to 43%. The decisive issue in the campaign was an unpopular citywide utility tax supported by then-Mayor Hunter, which was strongly opposed by Daly while he served as a City Councilmember. His 1994 re-election as mayor set a record for the most votes ever received by an Anaheim mayor.

In 1998, Daly defeated a strongly backed Republican and fellow council member Bob Zemel.

As mayor, Daly supported the candidacy of Loretta Sanchez for U.S. Congress. Daly served as an adviser to her successful upstart campaign against longtime incumbent and conservative Bob Dornan, in which Sanchez won by 984 votes.

=== Mayoral tenure ===
As mayor, Daly oversaw a billion-dollar expansion of the Anaheim Resort area, including the expansion of the Disneyland Resort with Disney California Adventure and Downtown Disney as well as an expansion of the Anaheim Convention Center. With these developments, the tourism industry grew tremendously in Anaheim, leading to more jobs and increased City revenue. Revenue from the hotel bed tax doubled from $28.7 million in 1991-92 to $57.7 million in 2001-02. Daly also oversaw the renovation of Angel Stadium. While Mayor, the Anaheim Angels won the 2002 World Series.

During his tenure, the City developed eight new city parks, reduced crime, established higher standards or citywide planning and land development, and created the Anaheim Colony Historic District with tax incentives for owners who maintain historic homes.

While mayor, Daly also served on the board of directors for the Orange County Transportation Authority, where he helped oversee the Measure M $3 billion improvement program.

==== Special prosecutor ====
In 1997, the Anaheim City Council took the unprecedented step of hiring a special prosecutor Ravi Mehta to investigate alleged campaign violations during the 1996 election. Only two out of the five-member council approved the hiring after the Anaheim City Attorney refused to file charges saying the allegations against Daly and Councilmember Irv Pickler were unfounded.

The probe by Mehta, a former chair of the state Fair Political Practices Commission, led to misdemeanor complaints against Daly and Picker. The complaints were ultimately rejected by an Orange County Municipal Judge, who also stated that the council had "no authority [to hire] a special prosecutor, period." The investigation ultimately cost the City of Anaheim more than $302,000 in legal fees. No other city or county in California had ever hired a special prosecutor to investigate suspected campaign finance violations. The investigation came during a time in which Daly considered running for the Orange County 4th Supervisorial District but ultimately declined to run citing personal reasons and his intent to run for reelection for mayor in 1998.

== Orange County Clerk-Recorder (2002–2012) ==
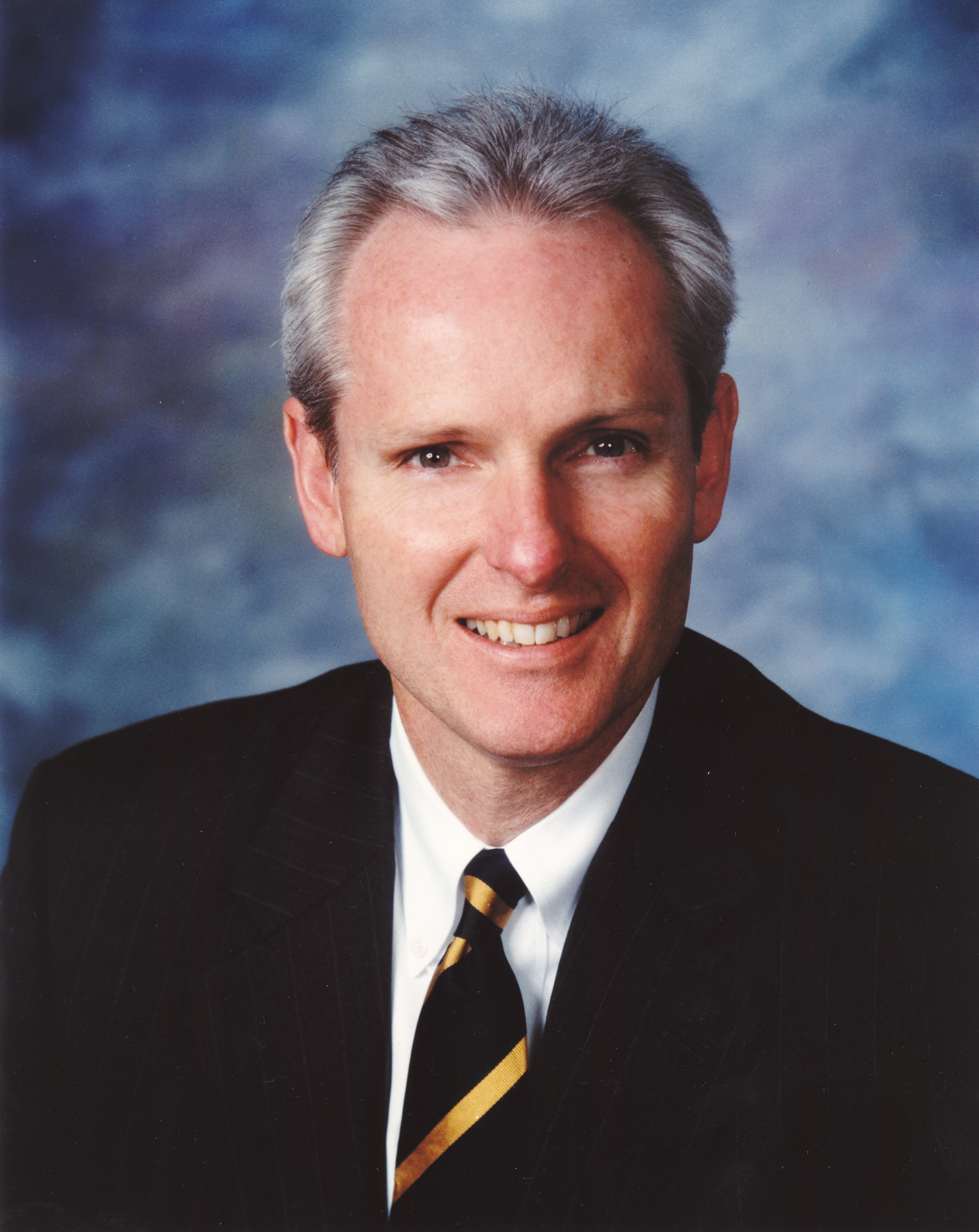
Daly as Clerk-Recorder

After serving as mayor, Daly ran for Orange County Clerk-Recorder, a countywide position responsible for handling county documents, including birth certificates, marriage licenses, and property transactions.

Daly defeated Bruce Peotter, a Newport Beach attorney and recording document executive, by a margin of 53.9% to 46.1%. The office was left vacant by the death of Gary Granville, who had introduced a number of innovations to the department and merged the clerk's department and the recorder's office in 1995.

As the Clerk-Recorder, Daly opened branch offices in historic downtown Fullerton and Laguna Hills Civic Center, providing more access to North and South County. He reopened the Orange County Archives as well as implemented Orange County's innovative Electronic Recording System. He also developed a number of online based system, improving efficiency for Orange County residents.

In his 2010 countywide re-election as the Clerk-Recorder, Daly set a record with the highest countywide winning percentage in fifty years (in contested races.)

Daly was named Orange County's Manager of the Year for 2010 by the Society for the Advancement of Management. In 2011, his department was honored with a Bright Ideas in Government award for "creative and innovative" customer service by the Kennedy School of Government at Harvard.

== California State Assembly (2012–2022) ==
=== 2012 election ===
On March 6, 2012, Daly announced his candidacy for the newly drawn 69th Assembly District to replace termed-out assemblymember Jose Solorio.

In the June 2012 primary election, Daly emerged with the highest number of votes and 39.2% of the overall vote. Democratic challengers Santa Ana councilmember Michele Martinez and Orange County Labor Federation-backed candidate Julio Perez failed to garner enough votes to reach the November general election.

In the November 2012 general election, Daly beat a relatively unknown Republican challenger, Joe Moreno, by a 67.6% to 32.4% margin.

=== State assemblymember ===
Assemblymember Daly was sworn into the Legislature on December 3, 2012.

Daly served on the following committees:

- Chair, Insurance
- Appropriations
- Governmental Organization
- Veterans Affairs
- Transportation
- Joint Fairs and Allocation

In 2013–14 he chaired the Budget Subcommittee No. 4 on State Administration. In this role, Daly championed efforts to reduce business filing processing delays and backlogs in the Secretary of State's office as well as speed up Veteran Affairs claims by returning service members from Iraq and Afghanistan.

==== 2014 California State Assembly ====
California's 69th State Assembly district election, 2014
Primary election
Party	Candidate	Votes	%
Democratic	Tom Daly (incumbent)	11,804	55.2
Republican	Sherry Walker	5,072	23.7
Republican	Cecilia "Ceci" Iglesias	4,489	21.0
Total votes		21,365	100.0
General election
Democratic	Tom Daly (incumbent)	32,332	67.4
Republican	Sherry Walker	15,665	32.6
Total votes		47,997	100.0
Democratic hold			

==== 2016 California State Assembly ====
California's 69th State Assembly district election, 2016
Primary election
Party	Candidate	Votes	%
Democratic	Tom Daly (incumbent)	38,139	70.3
Republican	Ofelia Velarde-Garcia	16,125	29.7
Total votes		54,264	100.0
General election
Democratic	Tom Daly (incumbent)	69,640	68.3
Republican	Ofelia Velarde-Garcia	32,324	31.7
Total votes		101,964	100.0
Democratic hold			

==== 2018 California State Assembly ====
California's 69th State Assembly district election, 2018
Primary election
Party	Candidate	Votes	%
Democratic	Tom Daly (incumbent)	30,411	99.7
Libertarian	Autumn Browne (write-in)	81	0.3
Total votes		30,492	100.0
General election
Democratic	Tom Daly (incumbent)	63,054	75.2
Libertarian	Autumn Browne	20,786	24.8
Total votes		83,840	100.0
Democratic hold			

==== 2020 California State Assembly ====
California's 69th State Assembly district election, 2020
Primary election
Party	Candidate	Votes	%
Democratic	Tom Daly (incumbent)	44,015	73.9
Republican	Jon Paul White	15,555	26.1
Total votes		59,570	100.0
General election
Democratic	Tom Daly (incumbent)	99,731	72.9
Republican	Jon Paul White	37,065	27.1
Total votes		136,796	100.0
Democratic hold			
