= Charles B. Dawson =

American politician (1892–1969)

Member of the California State Assembly from the 69th district
- In office January 8, 1923 - January 5, 1925
- Preceded by: Henry W. Wright
- Succeeded by: Jerome Valentine Scofield

Personal details
- Born: December 17, 1892 New York, US
- Died: November 19, 1969 (aged 76) California, US
- Party: Republican
- Spouse: Ruth

Military service
- Branch/service: United States Army
- Battles/wars: World War I

Charles Birles Dawson December 17, 1892 - November 19, 1969) served in the California State Assembly for the 69th district from 1923 to 1925 and during World War I he served in the United States Army.
