= Jim Morrissey (politician) =

American politician (1930–2023)

Member of the California State Assembly from the 69th district
- In office December 5, 1994 – November 30, 1998
- Preceded by: Tom Umberg
- Succeeded by: Lou Correa

Personal details
- Born: May 10, 1930 New Rochelle, New York, U.S.
- Died: November 5, 2023 (aged 93)
- Party: Republican
- Spouse: Margaret Morrissey
- Children: 6

Military service
- Branch/service: United States Air Force; United States Army

James Henry Morrissey (May 10, 1930 – November 5, 2023) was an American politician who served as a Republican Assemblyman from California's 69th State Assembly district from 1994 to 1998.

== Early life ==
Born May 10, 1930 in New Rochelle, New York. His family moved to Tucson, Arizona in 1943. Morrissey joined the Air Force in 1947 where he served for three years. He later joined the Army Reserve.

== Small businessman ==
Morrissey's first occupation was tool and die manufacturing. Later, he moved into management where he became the president of Superior Jig, Inc., a producer of precision aerospace parts.

== Political career ==
Morrissey got into politics several years ago after his wife saw him yelling at a politician on the TV screen and suggested he stop complaining and try to make a change. The couple volunteered their time for Republican Party. Jim founded the Irish Republican Club and the Republican Small Business Association. Jim Morrissey served on the executive board of the Republican Central Committee of Orange County.

In 1995, the Legislature passed a Morrissey resolution calling for the release of Jimmy Tran, an American citizen being held as a political prisoner in Vietnam. Jim later traveled to Vietnam at his own expense to try and win Tran's political freedom and that of nine other Vietnamese Americans. Morrissey said though the trip did not achieve its ultimate goal, but it brought attention to the cases of the Vietnamese-American prisoners.

== Personal life and death ==
In 1956, Morrissey and his young family moved to Los Angeles, California. From 1960, he was a resident of Orange County, and a resident of Anaheim from 1978. Morrissey and his wife (Margaret) had six children and fourteen grandchildren.

Jim Morrissey died on November 5, 2023, at the age of 93.

California Assembly
Preceded by Tom Umberg	California State Assemblyman; 69th District; December 5, 1994 – November 30, 1998	Succeeded by Lou Correa
