= 2022 United States House of Representatives elections in California =

- November 8, 2022

All 52 California seats to the United States House of Representatives
	Majority party	Minority party
Party	Democratic	Republican
Last election	42	11
Seats won	40	12
Seat change	▼2	▲1
Popular vote	6,743,737	3,859,666
Percentage	63.28%	36.22%
Swing	▼2.99%	▲2.49%

Democratic hold
Republican hold Republican gain
Democratic
50–60%
60–70%
70–80%
80–90%
90–100%
Republican
50–60%
60–70%
70–80%

The 2022 United States House of Representatives elections in California were held on November 8, 2022, to elect representatives for the 52 seats in California (reduced from 53 in the redistricting cycle following the 2020 United States census). This marked the first time in the state's history that it lost a seat.

This was the second election using congressional districts drawn by the California Citizens Redistricting Commission (after 2012 following the 2010 census). The commission submitted the final maps to the California Secretary of State on December 27, 2021. These new districts were considered "enacted" as of December 27, 2021. However, there was a 90-day period that ended on March 27, 2022, for any referendum petition to be filed to prevent the maps from becoming effective. Even after becoming effective, these newly redrawn districts did not become official until the 2022 primary and general elections, and the new districts would not actually exist until the 2023 inaugurations.

Of the fifty-three incumbents, six retired. All remaining incumbents (except for CA-53, Sara Jacobs was redistricted to the 51st district, which she still represents) were re-elected, and five new representatives were elected, two of which were from newly drawn districts.

== Overview ==
=== Statewide ===
United States House of Representatives elections in California, 2022 primary election — June 7, 2022
Party	Votes	Percentage	Candidates	Advancing to general	Seats contesting
Democratic	4,272,322	61.95	115	58	52
Republican	2,525,467	36.62	124	45	45
No party preference	65,986	0.96	19	0	0
Green	26,314	0.38	3	1	1
Peace and Freedom	3,343	0.05	1	0	0
Libertarian	1,836	0.03	1	0	0
American Independent	1,460	0.02	1	0	0
Totals	6,896,728	100.00	264	104	—

Popular vote
Democratic	63.28%
Republican	36.22%
Green	0.50%

House seats
Democratic	76.92%
Republican	23.08%

=== District ===
Results of the 2022 United States House of Representatives elections in California by district:

District	Democratic		Republican		Green		Total		Result
District	Votes	%	Votes	%	Votes	%	Votes	%	Result
District 1	93,386	37.93%	152,839	62.07%	0	0.00%	246,225	100.0%	Republican hold
District 2	229,720	74.40%	79,029	25.60%	0	0.00%	308,749	100.0%	Democratic hold
District 3	156,761	46.35%	181,438	53.65%	0	0.00%	338,199	100.0%	Republican hold
District 4	176,900	67.80%	84,007	32.20%	0	0.00%	260,907	100.0%	Democratic hold
District 5	109,506	38.69%	173,524	61.31%	0	0.00%	283,030	100.0%	Republican hold
District 6	121,058	55.95%	95,325	44.05%	0	0.00%	216,383	100.0%	Democratic hold
District 7	150,618	68.26%	70,033	31.74%	0	0.00%	220,651	100.0%	Democratic hold
District 8	145,501	75.73%	46,634	24.27%	0	0.00%	192,135	100.0%	Democratic hold
District 9	95,598	54.82%	78,802	45.18%	0	0.00%	174,400	100.0%	Democratic hold
District 10	198,415	78.93%	0	0.00%	52,965	21.07%	251,380	100.0%	Democratic hold
District 11	220,848	83.95%	42,217	16.05%	0	0.00%	263,065	100.0%	Democratic hold
District 12	217,110	90.47%	22,859	9.53%	0	0.00%	239,969	100.0%	Democratic hold
District 13	66,496	49.79%	67,060	50.21%	0	0.00%	133,556	100.0%	Republican gain
District 14	137,612	69.34%	60,852	30.66%	0	0.00%	198,464	100.0%	Democratic hold
District 15	194,874	100.00%	0	0.00%	0	0.00%	194,874	100.0%	Democratic hold
District 16	241,007	100.00%	0	0.00%	0	0.00%	241,007	100.0%	Democratic hold
District 17	127,853	70.93%	52,400	29.07%	0	0.00%	180,253	100.0%	Democratic hold
District 18	99,776	65.85%	51,737	34.15%	0	0.00%	151,513	100.0%	Democratic hold
District 19	194,494	68.65%	88,816	31.35%	0	0.00%	283,310	100.0%	Democratic hold
District 20	74,934	32.75%	153,847	67.25%	0	0.00%	228,776	100.0%	Republican hold
District 21	68,074	54.18%	57,573	45.82%	0	0.00%	125,647	100.0%	Democratic hold
District 22	49,862	48.48%	52,994	51.52%	0	0.00%	102,852	100.0%	Republican hold
District 23	65,908	38.97%	103,197	61.03%	0	0.00%	169,105	100.0%	Republican hold
District 24	159,019	60.57%	103,533	39.43%	0	0.00%	262,552	100.0%	Democratic hold
District 25	87,641	57.38%	65,101	42.62%	0	0.00%	152,742	100.0%	Democratic hold
District 26	134,575	54.53%	112,214	45.47%	0	0.00%	246,789	100.0%	Democratic hold
District 27	91,892	46.76%	104,624	53.24%	0	0.00%	196,516	100.0%	Republican hold
District 28	150,062	66.24%	76,495	33.76%	0	0.00%	226,557	100.0%	Democratic hold
District 29	119,435	100.00%	0	0.00%	0	0.00%	119,435	100.0%	Democratic hold
District 30	211,068	100.00%	0	0.00%	0	0.00%	211,068	100.0%	Democratic hold
District 31	91,472	59.54%	62,153	40.46%	0	0.00%	153,625	100.0%	Democratic hold
District 32	167,411	69.17%	74,618	30.83%	0	0.00%	242,029	100.0%	Democratic hold
District 33	76,588	57.71%	56,119	42.29%	0	0.00%	132,707	100.0%	Democratic hold
District 34	121,467	100.00%	0	0.00%	0	0.00%	121,467	100.0%	Democratic hold
District 35	75,121	57.36%	55,832	42.64%	0	0.00%	130,953	100.0%	Democratic hold
District 36	194,299	69.75%	84,264	30.25%	0	0.00%	278,563	100.0%	Democratic hold
District 37	131,880	100.00%	0	0.00%	0	0.00%	131,880	100.0%	Democratic hold
District 38	101,260	58.09%	73,051	41.91%	0	0.00%	174,311	100.0%	Democratic hold
District 39	75,896	57.67%	55,701	42.33%	0	0.00%	131,597	100.0%	Democratic hold
District 40	122,722	43.16%	161,589	56.84%	0	0.00%	284,311	100.0%	Republican hold
District 41	112,769	47.65%	123,869	52.35%	0	0.00%	236,638	100.0%	Republican hold
District 42	99,217	68.37%	45,903	31.63%	0	0.00%	145,120	100.0%	Democratic hold
District 43	95,462	77.33%	27,985	22.67%	0	0.00%	123,447	100.0%	Democratic hold
District 44	100,160	72.21%	38,554	27.79%	0	0.00%	138,714	100.0%	Democratic hold
District 45	103,466	47.59%	113,960	52.41%	0	0.00%	217,426	100.0%	Republican hold
District 46	78,041	61.79%	48,257	38.21%	0	0.00%	126,298	100.0%	Democratic hold
District 47	137,374	51.72%	128,261	48.28%	0	0.00%	265,635	100.0%	Democratic hold
District 48	101,900	39.64%	155,171	60.36%	0	0.00%	257,071	100.0%	Republican hold
District 49	153,541	52.63%	138,194	47.37%	0	0.00%	291,735	100.0%	Democratic hold
District 50	168,816	62.84%	99,819	37.16%	0	0.00%	268,635	100.0%	Democratic hold
District 51	144,186	61.86%	88,886	38.14%	0	0.00%	233,072	100.0%	Democratic hold
District 52	100,686	66.67%	50,330	33.33%	0	0.00%	151,016	100.0%	Democratic hold
Total	6,743,737	63.28%	3,859,666	36.22%	52,965	0.50%	10,656,368	100.0%	

== District 1 ==
2022 California's 1st congressional district election
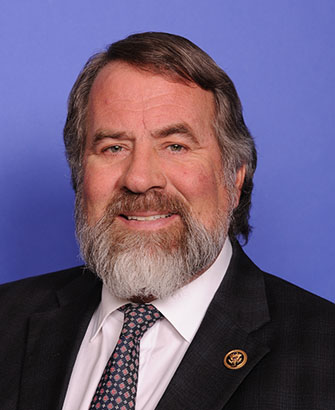

Candidate	Doug LaMalfa	Max Steiner
Party	Republican	Democratic
Popular vote	152,839	93,386
Percentage	62.1%	37.9%
- County results LaMalfa: 50–60% 60–70% 70–80%
U.S. Representative before election
Doug LaMalfa
Republican
Elected U.S. Representative
Doug LaMalfa
Republican

Republican Doug LaMalfa, who had represented the district since 2013, was re-elected with 57.0% of the vote in 2020. LaMalfa was running for re-election.

=== Candidates ===
==== Advanced to general ====
- Doug LaMalfa (Republican), incumbent U.S. representative
- Max Steiner (Democratic), U.S. Foreign Service veteran

==== Eliminated in primary ====
- Tim Geist (Republican), biopsychology researcher
- Rose Penelope Yee (no party preference), businesswoman

=== Endorsements ===
Doug LaMalfa

Federal officials

- Donald Trump, former president of the United States

Organizations

- California Republican Party

=== Predictions ===
Source	Ranking	As of
The Cook Political Report	Solid R	December 21, 2021
Inside Elections	Solid R	December 28, 2021
Sabato's Crystal Ball	Safe R	January 4, 2022
Politico	Solid R	April 5, 2022
RCP	Safe R	June 9, 2022
Fox News	Solid R	July 11, 2022
DDHQ	Solid R	July 20, 2022
538	Solid R	June 30, 2022
The Economist	Safe R	September 7, 2022

=== Results ===
California's 1st congressional district, 2022
Primary election
Party	Candidate	Votes	%
Republican	Doug LaMalfa (incumbent)	96,858	57.1
Democratic	Max Steiner	55,549	32.8
Republican	Tim Geist	11,408	6.7
No party preference	Rose Penelope Yee	5,777	3.4
Total votes		169,592	100.0
General election
Republican	Doug LaMalfa (incumbent)	152,839	62.1
Democratic	Max Steiner	93,386	37.9
Total votes		246,225	100.0
Republican hold			

==== By county ====
County	Doug LaMalfa Republican		Max Steiner Democratic		Margin		Total votes cast
County	#	%	#	%	#	%	Total votes cast
Butte	36,776	50.88%	35,503	49.12%	1,273	1.76%	72,279
Colusa	3,794	69.02%	1,703	30.98%	2,091	38.04%	5,497
Glenn	5,450	69.23%	2,422	30.77%	3,028	38.47%	7,872
Lassen	7,280	79.68%	1,856	20.32%	5,424	59.37%	9,136
Modoc	2,502	73.59%	898	26.41%	1,604	47.18%	3,400
Shasta	44,931	66.06%	23,087	33.94%	21,844	32.12%	68,018
Siskiyou	10,714	60.73%	6,929	39.27%	3,785	21.45%	17,643
Sutter	18,421	66.38%	9,328	33.62%	9,093	32.77%	27,749
Tehama	14,136	68.75%	6,424	31.25%	7,712	37.51%	20,560
Yuba (part)	8,835	62.79%	5,236	37.21%	3,599	25.58%	14,071
Totals	152,839	62.07%	93,386	37.93%	59,453	24.15%	246,225

== District 2 ==
2022 California's 2nd congressional district election
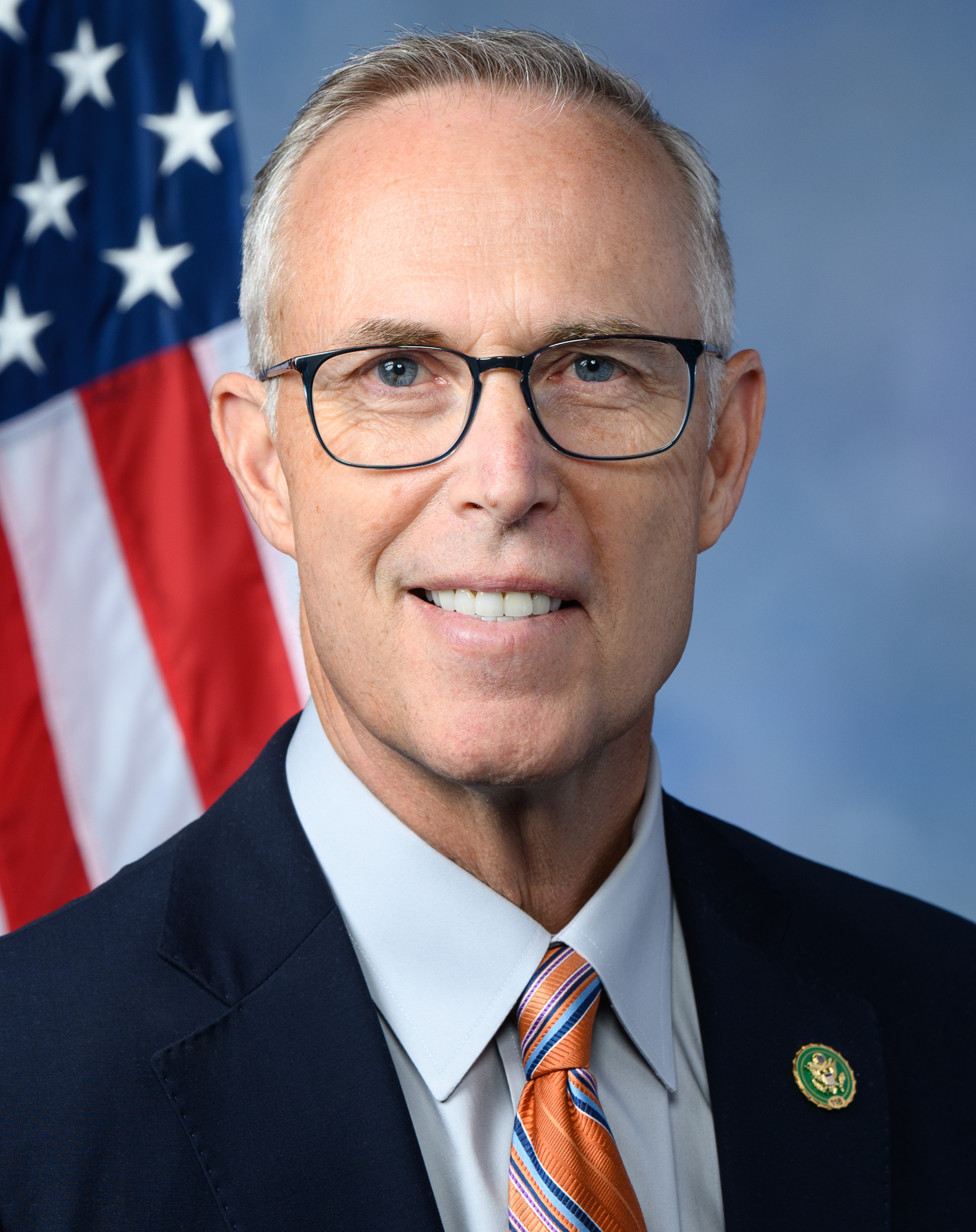

Candidate	Jared Huffman	Douglas Brower
Party	Democratic	Republican
Popular vote	229,720	79,029
Percentage	74.4%	25.6%
- County results Huffman: 60–70% 70–80% 80–90% Brower: 50–60%
U.S. Representative before election
Jared Huffman
Democratic
Elected U.S. Representative
Jared Huffman
Democratic

Democrat Jared Huffman, who had represented the district since 2013, was re-elected with 75.7% of the vote in 2020.

=== Candidates ===
==== Advanced to general ====
- Douglas Brower (Republican), chair of the Humboldt County Republican Party and former Ferndale city councilmember
- Jared Huffman (Democratic), incumbent U.S. representative

==== Eliminated in primary ====
- Chris Coulombe (Republican), businessman
- Darian Elizondo (Republican), business owner
- Beth Hampson (Democratic), educator
- Archimedes Ramirez (Republican), neurosurgeon

=== Endorsements ===
Douglas Brower (R)

Organizations

- California Republican Party
Jared Huffman (D)

Organizations

- California Environmental Voters
- League of Conservation Voters
- Natural Resources Defense Council
- Planned Parenthood Action Fund
- Sierra Club

Labor unions

- United Auto Workers
- United Farm Workers

=== Predictions ===
Source	Ranking	As of
The Cook Political Report	Solid D	December 21, 2021
Inside Elections	Safe D	November 3, 2022
Sabato's Crystal Ball	Safe D	January 4, 2022
Politico	Solid D	April 5, 2022
RCP	Safe D	June 9, 2022
Fox News	Solid D	July 11, 2022
DDHQ	Solid D	July 20, 2022
538	Solid D	June 30, 2022
The Economist	Safe D	September 7, 2022

=== Results ===
California's 2nd congressional district, 2022
Primary election
Party	Candidate	Votes	%
Democratic	Jared Huffman (incumbent)	145,245	68.7
Republican	Douglas Brower	18,102	8.6
Republican	Chris Coulombe	17,498	8.3
Democratic	Beth Hampson	14,262	6.7
Republican	Archimedes Ramirez	12,202	5.8
Republican	Darian J. Elizondo	4,012	1.9
Total votes		211,321	100.0
General election
Democratic	Jared Huffman (incumbent)	229,720	74.4
Republican	Douglas Brower	79,029	25.6
Total votes		308,749	100.0
Democratic hold			

==== By county ====
County	Jared Huffman Democratic		Douglas Brower Republican		Margin		Total votes cast
County	#	%	#	%	#	%	Total votes cast
Del Norte	3,607	43.62%	4,662	56.38%	−1,055	−12.76%	8,269
Humboldt	31,691	66.46%	15,993	33.54%	15,698	32.92%	47,684
Marin	97,612	82.85%	20,205	17.15%	77,407	65.70%	117,817
Mendocino	20,240	67.10%	9,926	32.90%	10,314	34.19%	30,166
Sonoma (part)	74,451	74.22%	25,855	25.78%	48,596	48.45%	100,306
Trinity	2,119	47.02%	2,388	52.98%	−269	−5.97%	4,507
Totals	229,720	74.40%	79,029	25.60%	150,691	48.81%	308,749

== District 3 ==
2022 California's 3rd congressional district election
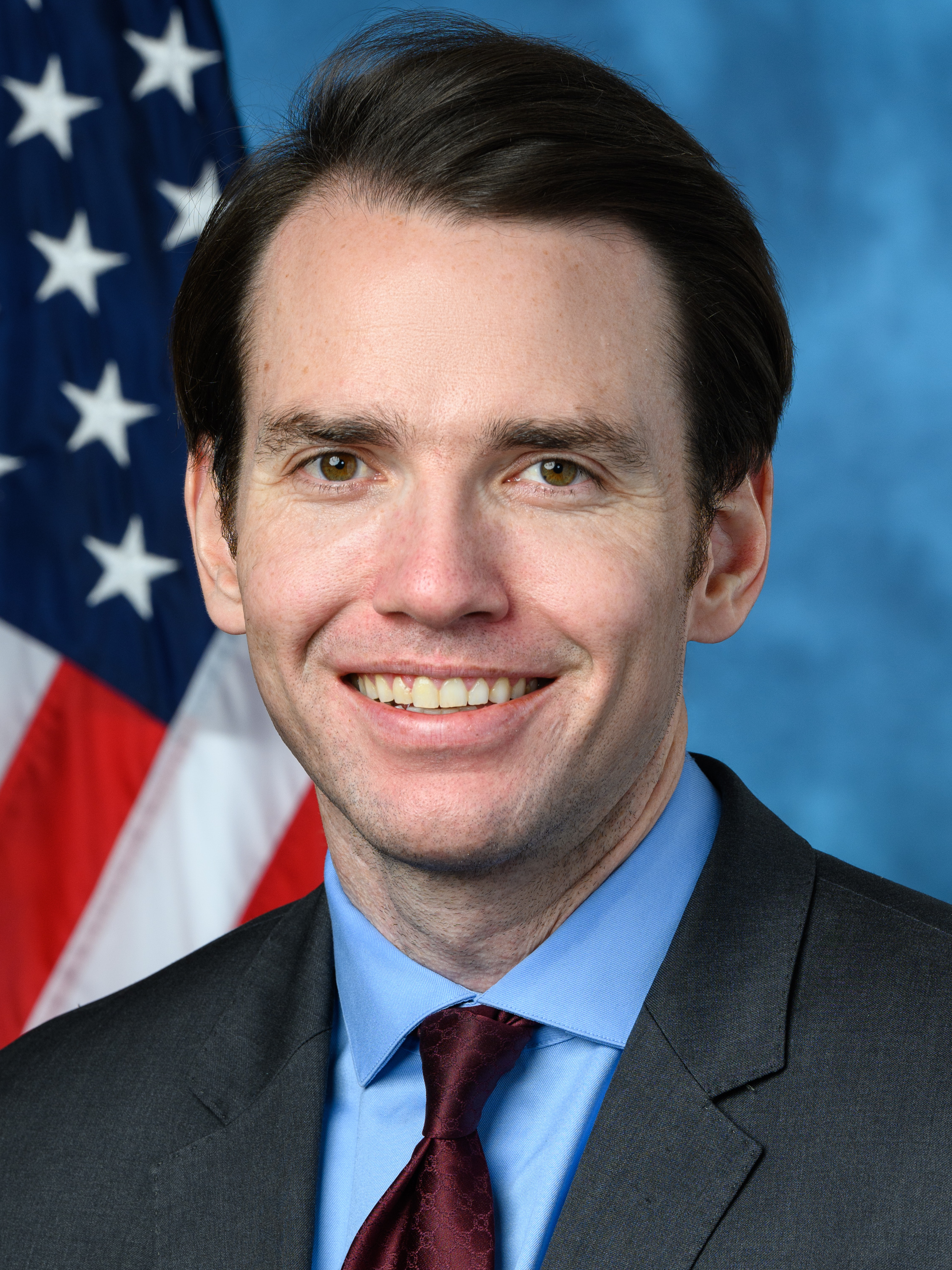

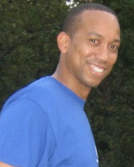
Candidate	Kevin Kiley	Kermit Jones
Party	Republican	Democratic
Popular vote	181,438	156,761
Percentage	53.65%	46.35%
- County results Kiley: 50–60% 60–70% 70–80% Jones: 50–60% 60–70%
U.S. Representative before election
None (new seat)
Elected U.S. Representative
Kevin Kiley
Republican

This seat was open after Democrat John Garamendi, who had represented the 3rd district since 2013, opted to run in the 8th district.

=== Candidates ===
==== Advanced to general ====
- Kermit Jones (Democratic), internal medicine physician, U.S. Navy veteran, and former White House Fellow
- Kevin Kiley (Republican), state assemblyman and candidate for governor of California in 2021

==== Eliminated in primary ====
- Scott Jones (Republican), Sacramento County sheriff and runner-up for the 7th district in 2016
- David Peterson (Democratic), technology professional and perennial candidate

==== Withdrew ====
- Tom McClintock (Republican), incumbent U.S. representative (running in 5th district)

=== Endorsements ===
Kermit Jones (D)

Organizations

- 314 Action
- Human Rights Campaign
- League of Conservation Voters
- New Politics
- Sierra Club

=== Predictions ===
Source	Ranking	As of
The Cook Political Report	Likely R (flip)	December 21, 2021
Inside Elections	Likely R (flip)	December 28, 2021
Sabato's Crystal Ball	Likely R (flip)	January 4, 2022
Politico	Likely R (flip)	November 7, 2022
RCP	Likely R (flip)	June 9, 2022
Fox News	Likely R (flip)	August 22, 2022
DDHQ	Likely R (flip)	July 20, 2022
538	Solid R (flip)	October 19, 2022
The Economist	Likely R (flip)	September 7, 2022

=== Polling ===
Hypothetical polling

Scott Jones vs. Kevin Kiley

Poll source	Date(s) administered	Sample size (Note: Key: A – all adults RV – registered voters LV – likely voters V – unclear)	Margin of error	Scott Jones (R)	Kevin Kiley (R)	Undecided
Public Opinion Strategies (R) (Note: Archived May 15, 2022, at the Wayback Machine) (Note: Poll sponsored by Kiley's campaign)	May 10–12, 2022	350 (LV)	± 5.2%	13%	28%	59%

=== Results ===
California's 3rd congressional district, 2022
Primary election
Party	Candidate	Votes	%
Republican	Kevin Kiley	93,552	39.7
Democratic	Kermit Jones	91,217	38.7
Republican	Scott Jones	38,288	16.2
Democratic	David Peterson	12,675	5.4
Total votes		235,732	100.0
General election
Republican	Kevin Kiley	181,438	53.6
Democratic	Kermit Jones	156,761	46.4
Total votes		338,199	100.0
Republican win (new seat)			

==== By county ====
County	Kevin Kiley Republican		Kermit Jones Democratic		Margin		Total votes cast
County	#	%	#	%	#	%	Total votes cast
Alpine	241	39.38%	371	60.62%	−130	−21.24%	612
El Dorado (part)	13,433	51.68%	12,562	48.32%	871	3.35%	25,995
Inyo	3,775	51.44%	3,563	48.56%	212	2.89%	7,338
Mono	1,882	41.69%	2,632	58.31%	−750	−16.61%	4,514
Nevada	22,290	44.01%	28,363	55.99%	−6,073	−11.99%	50,653
Placer	102,352	56.42%	79,058	43.58%	23,294	12.84%	181,410
Plumas	5,103	59.41%	3,487	40.59%	1,616	18.81%	8,590
Sacramento (part)	27,639	52.92%	24,585	47.08%	3,054	5.85%	52,224
Sierra	971	62.52%	582	37.48%	389	25.05%	1,553
Yuba (part)	3,752	70.66%	1,558	29.34%	2,194	41.32%	5,310
Totals	181,438	53.65%	156,761	46.35%	24,677	7.30%	338,199

== District 4 ==
2022 California's 4th congressional district election
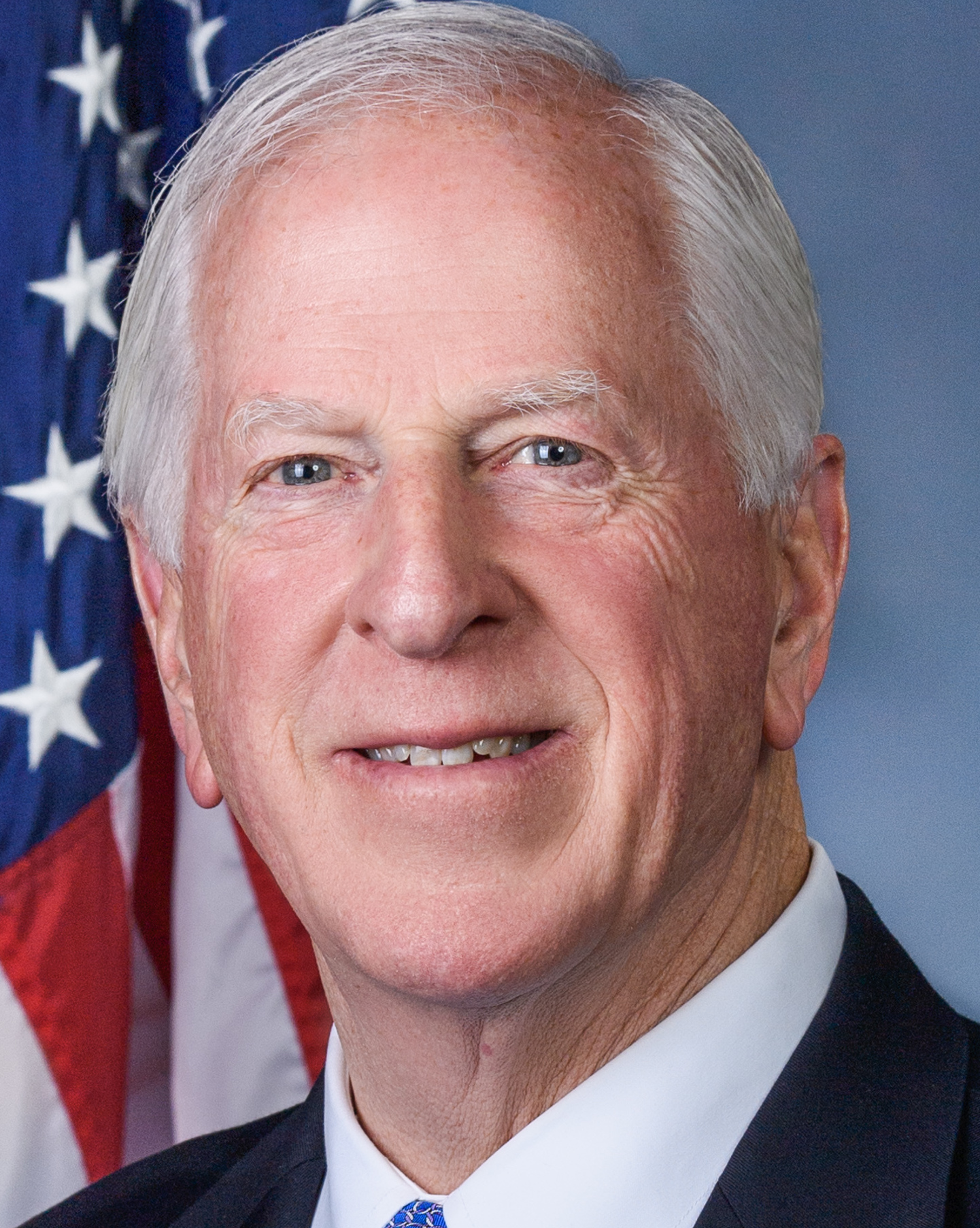

Candidate	Mike Thompson	Matt Brock
Party	Democratic	Republican
Popular vote	176,900	84,007
Percentage	67.8%	32.2%
- Thompson: 50–60% 60–70% 70–80% 80–90% 90–100% Brock: 50–60% 60–70% No results
U.S. Representative before election
Mike Thompson
Democratic
Elected U.S. Representative
Mike Thompson
Democratic

The boundaries of the district were redrawn during the 2020 redistricting cycle and incumbent Tom McClintock opted to run in the 5th district. Democrat Mike Thompson, who had represented the 5th district since 2013, was re-elected with 76.1% of the vote in 2020.

=== Candidates ===
==== Advanced to general ====
- Matt Brock (Republican), water utility supervisor
- Mike Thompson (Democratic), incumbent U.S. representative

==== Eliminated in primary ====
- Andrew Engdahl (Democratic), community organizer and business leader
- Scott Giblin (Republican), information services technician and runner-up for this district in 2020
- Jimih Jones (Republican), parts advisor
- Jason Kishineff (no party preference), homemaker

=== Endorsements ===
Matt Brock (R)

Organizations

- California Republican Party
- Howard Jarvis Taxpayers Association PAC
- Lake County Republican Party
- Solano County Republican Party
- Sonoma County Republican Party
- Yolo County Republican Party
Mike Thompson (D)

U.S. senators

- Dianne Feinstein, U.S. senator from California
- Alex Padilla, U.S. senator from California

Organizations

- California Environmental Voters
- Planned Parenthood Action Fund
- Sierra Club

Labor unions

- United Auto Workers

=== Predictions ===
Source	Ranking	As of
The Cook Political Report	Solid D	December 21, 2021
Inside Elections	Solid D	December 28, 2021
Sabato's Crystal Ball	Safe D	January 4, 2022
Politico	Solid D	April 5, 2022
RCP	Safe D	June 9, 2022
Fox News	Solid D	July 11, 2022
DDHQ	Solid D	July 20, 2022
538	Solid D	June 30, 2022
The Economist	Safe D	September 7, 2022

=== Results ===
California's 4th congressional district, 2022
Primary election
Party	Candidate	Votes	%
Democratic	Mike Thompson (incumbent)	115,041	66.2
Republican	Matt Brock	28,260	16.3
Republican	Scott Giblin	16,914	9.7
Democratic	Andrew Engdahl	8,634	5.0
No party preference	Jason Kishineff	2,477	1.4
Republican	Jimih L. Jones	2,363	1.4
No party preference	Seth T. Newman (write-in)	15	0.0
Total votes		173,704	100.0
General election
Democratic	Mike Thompson (incumbent)	176,900	67.8
Republican	Matt Brock	84,007	32.2
Total votes		260,907	100.0
Democratic hold			

==== By county ====
County	Mike Thompson Democratic		Matt Brock Republican		Margin		Total votes cast
County	#	%	#	%	#	%	Total votes cast
Lake	11,075	55.35%	8,935	44.65%	2,140	10.69%	20,010
Napa	34,958	70.17%	14,863	29.83%	20,095	40.33%	49,821
Solano (part)	22,518	49.67%	22,221	50.33%	-297	-0.66%	44,739
Sonoma (part)	72,147	76.07%	22,695	23.93%	49,452	52.14%	94,842
Yolo (part)	36,499	70.88%	14,996	29.12%	21,503	41.76%	51,495
Totals	176,900	67.80%	84,007	32.20%	92,893	35.60%	260,907

== District 5 ==
2022 California's 5th congressional district election
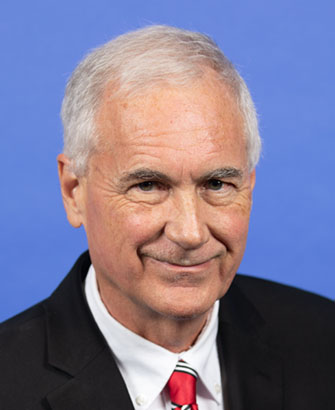

Candidate	Tom McClintock	Michael J. Barkley
Party	Republican	Democratic
Popular vote	173,524	109,506
Percentage	61.3%	38.7%
- County results McClintock: 50–60% 60–70%
U.S. Representative before election
Tom McClintock
Republican
Elected U.S. Representative
Tom McClintock
Republican

Due to redistricting, the incumbent changed from Democrat Mike Thompson to Republican Devin Nunes. Nunes initially ran for re-election, but resigned his seat on January 1, 2022, in order to become the CEO of Trump Media & Technology Group. After this, fellow Republican Tom McClintock switched to running in this district. McClintock, who had represented the 4th district since 2009, was re-elected with 55.9% of the vote in 2020.

=== Candidates ===
==== Advanced to general ====
- Michael J. Barkley (Democratic), lawyer
- Tom McClintock (Republican), incumbent U.S. representative

==== Eliminated in primary ====
- Nathan Magsig (Republican), Fresno County supervisor
- David Main (Republican), emergency room physician
- Kelsten Charles Obert (Republican), businessman
- Steve Wozniak (no party preference), editor

==== Withdrew ====
- Phil Arballo (Democratic), financial advisor and runner-up for this district in 2020 (running in the 13th district)
- Ricky Gill (Republican), former member of the U.S. National Security Council and the California State Board of Education and runner-up for the 9th district in 2012 (endorsed Tom McClintock)
- Elizabeth Heng (Republican), tech entrepreneur and runner-up for the 16th district in 2020 (running in the 13th district)
- Devin Nunes (Republican), former U.S. representative (2013–2022) (endorsed Tom McClintock)

==== Declined ====
- Andreas Borgeas (Republican), state senator
- Mike Boudreaux (Republican), Tulare County sheriff (endorsed Magsig)
- Steve Brandau (Republican), chair of the Fresno County Board of Supervisors
- Luis Chavez (Democratic), president of the Fresno city council (running for reelection)
- Jerry Dyer (Republican), mayor of Fresno
- Shannon Grove (Republican), state senator from the 16th district and former Minority Leader of the California Senate
- Melissa Hurtado (Democratic), state senator (running for re-election)
- Andrew Janz (Democratic), Fresno County prosecutor, runner-up for this district in 2018, and candidate for mayor of Fresno in 2020
- Devon Mathis (Republican), state assemblyman (running for reelection)
- Margaret Mims (Republican), Fresno County sheriff
- Jim Patterson (Republican), state assemblyman (running for reelection, endorsed Magsig)
- Lisa Smittcamp (Republican), Fresno County district attorney
- Paul Vander Poel III (Republican), Tulare County supervisor
- Tim Ward (Republican), Tulare County district attorney
- Bob Whalen (Republican), Clovis city councilor

=== Endorsements ===
Tom McClintock (R)

Individuals

- Devin Nunes, former U.S. representative (2003–2022)
- Donald Trump, former president of the United States (2017–2021)

=== Predictions ===
Source	Ranking	As of
The Cook Political Report	Solid R	December 21, 2021
Inside Elections	Solid R	December 28, 2021
Sabato's Crystal Ball	Safe R	January 4, 2022
Politico	Solid R	April 5, 2022
RCP	Safe R	June 9, 2022
Fox News	Solid R	July 11, 2022
DDHQ	Solid R	July 20, 2022
538	Solid R	June 30, 2022
The Economist	Safe R	September 7, 2022

=== Results ===
California's 5th congressional district, 2022
Primary election
Party	Candidate	Votes	%
Republican	Tom McClintock (incumbent)	87,010	45.5
Democratic	Michael J. Barkley	64,285	33.6
Republican	Nathan Magsig	25,299	13.2
No party preference	Steve Wozniak	6,045	3.2
Republican	David Main	5,927	3.1
Republican	Kelsten Charles Obert	2,864	1.5
Total votes		191,430	100.0
General election
Republican	Tom McClintock (incumbent)	173,524	61.3
Democratic	Michael J. Barkley	109,506	38.7
Total votes		283,030	100.0
Republican hold			

==== By county ====
County	Tom McClintock Republican		Michael J. Barkley Democratic		Margin		Total votes cast
County	#	%	#	%	#	%	Total votes cast
Amador	11,941	64.76%	6,498	35.24%	5,443	29.52%	18,439
Calaveras	13,478	63.94%	7,602	36.06%	5,876	27.87%	21,080
El Dorado (part)	37,797	61.18%	23,978	38.82%	13,819	22.37%	61,775
Fresno (part)	26,823	60.54%	17,485	39.46%	9,338	21.08%	44,308
Madera (part)	9,963	67.62%	4,770	32.38%	5,193	35.25%	14,733
Mariposa	4,717	60.61%	3,065	39.39%	1,652	21.23%	7,782
Stanislaus (part)	54,645	59.50%	37,202	40.50%	17,443	18.99%	91,847
Tuolumne	14,160	61.39%	8,906	38.61%	5,254	22.78%	23,066
Totals	173,524	61.31%	109,506	38.69%	64,018	22.62%	283,030

== District 6 ==
2022 California's 6th congressional district election
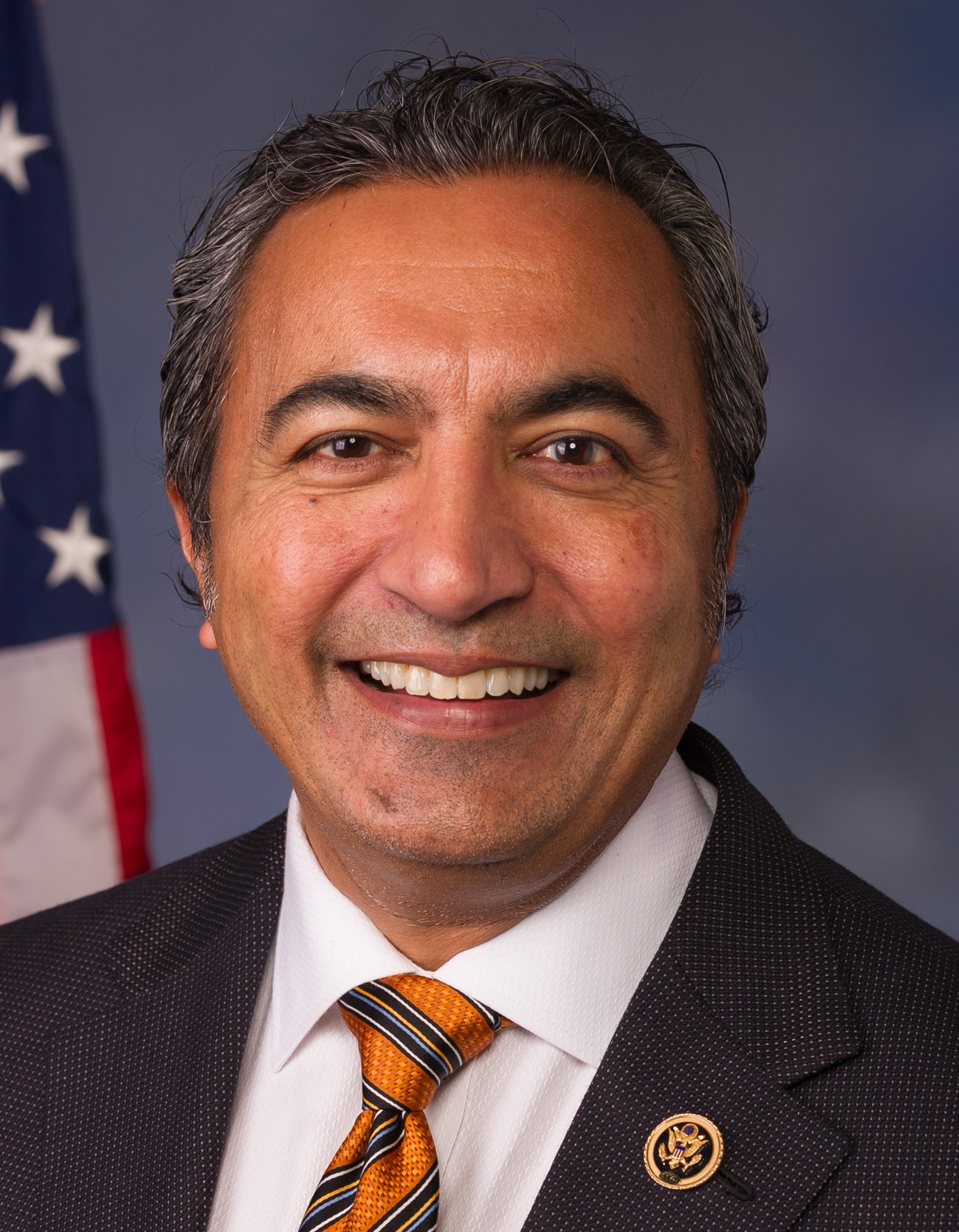

Candidate	Ami Bera	Tamika Hamilton
Party	Democratic	Republican
Popular vote	121,058	95,325
Percentage	55.9%	44.1%
- County results Bera: 50–60%
U.S. Representative before election
Ami Bera
Democratic
Elected U.S. Representative
Ami Bera
Democratic

Due to redistricting, 6th district incumbent Ami Bera and 7th district incumbent Doris Matsui, both Democrats, swapped districts. Bera, who had represented the 7th district since 2013, was re-elected with 56.6% of the vote in 2020.

=== Candidates ===
==== Advanced to general ====
- Ami Bera (Democratic), incumbent U.S. representative
- Tamika Hamilton (Republican), pastor, U.S. Air Force veteran, and runner-up for CA-03 in 2020 (previously ran in 8th district)

==== Eliminated in primary ====
- Chris Bish (Republican), realtor and small business owner
- Karla Black (Republican)
- Bret Daniels (Republican), Citrus Heights city councilor
- Mark Gorman (Democratic), retail worker
- D. Keith Langford Jr. (Republican)

=== Endorsements ===
Ami Bera (D)

Organizations

- California Environmental Voters
- League of Conservation Voters
- NARAL Pro-Choice America
- Natural Resources Defense Council
- Planned Parenthood Action Fund

Labor unions

- United Auto Workers
Tamika Hamilton (R)

Organizations

- Maggie's List

=== Predictions ===
Source	Ranking	As of
The Cook Political Report	Solid D	December 21, 2021
Inside Elections	Solid D	December 28, 2021
Sabato's Crystal Ball	Safe D	January 4, 2022
Politico	Likely D	November 7, 2022
RCP	Likely D	June 9, 2022
Fox News	Solid D	October 11, 2022
DDHQ	Solid D	July 20, 2022
538	Solid D	June 30, 2022
The Economist	Likely D	November 1, 2022

=== Results ===
California's 6th congressional district, 2022
Primary election
Party	Candidate	Votes	%
Democratic	Ami Bera (incumbent)	76,317	52.6
Republican	Tamika Hamilton	27,339	18.8
Republican	Bret Daniels	16,612	11.5
Republican	Christine Bish	11,421	7.9
Democratic	Mark Gorman	7,528	5.2
Republican	Karla Black	3,553	2.4
Republican	D. Keith Langford, Jr.	2,272	1.6
Green	Chris Richardson (write-in)	15	0.0
Total votes		145,057	100.0
General election
Democratic	Ami Bera (incumbent)	121,058	55.9
Republican	Tamika Hamilton	95,325	44.1
Total votes		216,383	100.0
Democratic hold			

==== By county ====
County	Ami Bera Democratic		Tamika Hamilton Republican		Margin		Total votes cast
County	#	%	#	%	#	%	Total votes cast
Sacramento (part)	121,058	55.95%	95,325	44.05%	25,733	11.89%	216,383
Totals	121,058	55.95%	95,325	44.05%	25,733	11.89%	216,383

== District 7 ==
2022 California's 7th congressional district election
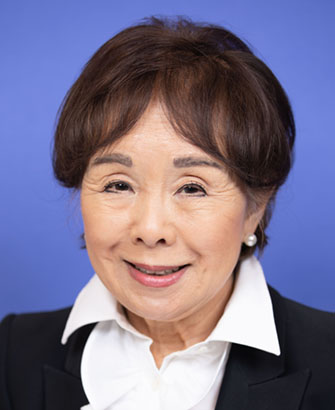

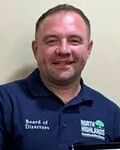
Candidate	Doris Matsui	Max Semenenko
Party	Democratic	Republican
Popular vote	150,618	70,033
Percentage	68.3%	31.7%
- County results Matsui: 60–70%
U.S. Representative before election
Doris Matsui
Democratic
Elected U.S. Representative
Doris Matsui
Democratic

Due to redistricting, 6th district incumbent Ami Bera and 7th district incumbent Doris Matsui, both Democrats, swapped districts. Matsui, who had represented the 6th district since 2013, was re-elected with 73.3% of the vote in 2020.

=== Candidates ===
==== Advanced to general ====
- Doris Matsui (Democratic), incumbent U.S. representative
- Max Semenenko (Republican), small business owner

==== Eliminated in primary ====
- Jimmy Fremgen (Democratic), former staffer for U.S. Representative Elijah Cummings

==== Withdrawn ====
- Mathew Ray Jedeikin (Democratic)

=== Endorsements ===
Doris Matsui (D)

Organizations

- California Environmental Voters
- Feminist Majority PAC
- League of Conservation Voters
- Planned Parenthood Action Fund

Labor unions

- United Auto Workers

=== Predictions ===
Source	Ranking	As of
The Cook Political Report	Solid D	December 21, 2021
Inside Elections	December 28, 2021	
Sabato's Crystal Ball	Safe D	January 4, 2022
Politico	Solid D	April 5, 2022
RCP	Safe D	June 9, 2022
Fox News	Solid D	July 11, 2022
DDHQ	Solid D	July 20, 2022
538	Solid D	June 30, 2022
The Economist	Safe D	September 7, 2022

=== Results ===
California's 7th congressional district, 2022
Primary election
Party	Candidate	Votes	%
Democratic	Doris Matsui (incumbent)	94,896	63.2
Republican	Max Semenenko	42,728	28.5
Democratic	Jimmy Fremgen	12,550	8.3
Total votes		150,174	100.0
General election
Democratic	Doris Matsui (incumbent)	150,618	68.3
Republican	Max Semenenko	70,033	31.7
Total votes		220,651	100.0
Democratic hold			

==== By county ====
County	Doris Matsui Democratic		Max Semenenko Republican		Margin		Total votes cast
County	#	%	#	%	#	%	Total votes cast
Sacramento (part)	140,666	68.50%	64,683	31.50%	75,983	37.00%	205,349
Solano (part)	21	60.00%	14	40.00%	7	20.00%	35
Yolo (part)	9,931	65.05%	5,336	34.95%	4,595	30.10%	15,267
Totals	150,618	68.26%	70,033	31.74%	80,585	36.52%	220,651

== District 8 ==
2022 California's 8th congressional district election
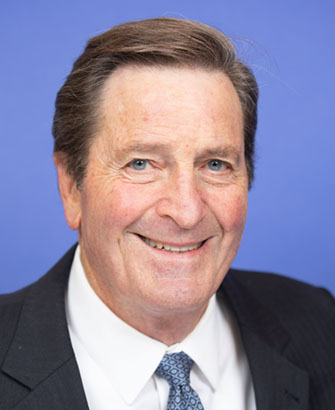

Candidate	John Garamendi	Rudy Recile
Party	Democratic	Republican
Popular vote	145,501	46,634
Percentage	75.7%	24.3%
- County results Garamendi: 60–70% 80–90%
U.S. Representative before election
John Garamendi
Democratic
Elected U.S. Representative
John Garamendi
Democratic

Due to redistricting, the incumbent changed from Republican Jay Obernolte to Democrat John Garamendi. Garamendi, who had represented the 3rd district since 2013, was re-elected with 54.7% of the vote in 2020. Garamendi was running for re-election.

=== Candidates ===
==== Advanced to general ====
- John Garamendi (Democratic), incumbent U.S. representative
- Rudy Recile (Republican), businessman and retired U.S. Army officer

==== Eliminated in primary ====
- Christopher Riley (Democratic), teacher
- Edwin Rutsch (Democratic), community organizer
- Cheryl Sudduth (Democratic), vice president of the West County Wastewater District board of directors

==== Disqualified ====
- Jason Paletta (Republican), police officer and U.S. Army veteran

==== Withdrew ====
- Tamika Hamilton (Republican), pastor, U.S. Air Force veteran, and runner-up for CA-03 in 2020 (running in 6th district)

=== Endorsements ===
John Garamendi (D)

Organizations

- California Environmental Voters
- Equality California
- Feminist Majority PAC
- Planned Parenthood Action Fund
- Sierra Club

Labor unions

- SEIU California
- United Auto Workers
Rudy Recile (R)

Organizations

- Solano County Republican Party
- Yolo County Republican Party
Tamika Hamilton (R) (withdrew)

Organizations

- Maggie's List

=== Predictions ===
Source	Ranking	As of
The Cook Political Report	Solid D	December 21, 2021
Inside Elections	Solid D	December 28, 2021
Sabato's Crystal Ball	Safe D	January 4, 2022
Politico	Solid D	April 5, 2022
RCP	Safe D	June 9, 2022
Fox News	Solid D	July 11, 2022
DDHQ	Solid D	July 20, 2022
538	Solid D	June 30, 2022
The Economist	Safe D	September 7, 2022

=== Results ===
California's 8th congressional district, 2022
Primary election
Party	Candidate	Votes	%
Democratic	John Garamendi (incumbent)	72,333	63.1
Republican	Rudy Recile	23,518	20.5
Democratic	Cheryl Sudduth	11,378	9.9
Democratic	Christopher Riley	3,926	3.4
Democratic	Edwin Rutsch	3,268	2.9
Democratic	Demnlus Johnson (write-in)	234	0.2
Total votes		114,657	100.0
General election
Democratic	John Garamendi (incumbent)	145,501	75.7
Republican	Rudy Recile	46,634	24.3
Total votes		192,135	100.0
Democratic hold			

==== By county ====
County	John Garamendi Democratic		Rudy Recile Republican		Margin		Total votes cast
County	#	%	#	%	#	%	Total votes cast
Contra Costa (part)	86,998	80.48%	21,098	19.52%	65,900	60.96%	108,096
Solano (part)	58,503	69.61%	25,536	30.39%	32,967	39.23%	84,039
Totals	145,501	75.73%	46,634	24.27%	98,867	51.46%	192,135

== District 9 ==
2022 California's 9th congressional district election
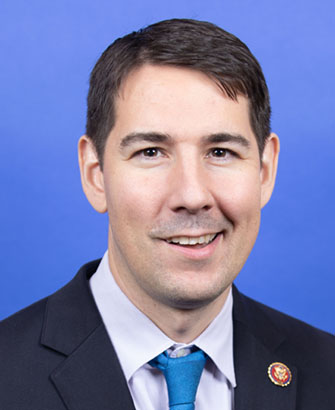

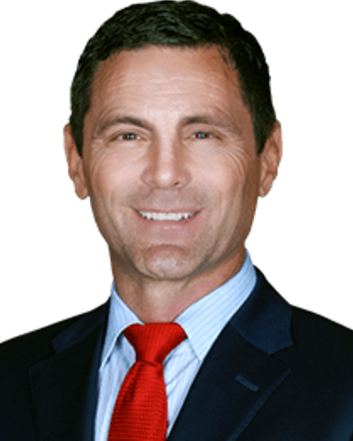
Candidate	Josh Harder	Tom Patti
Party	Democratic	Republican
Popular vote	95,598	78,802
Percentage	54.8%	45.2%
- County results Harder: 50–60% Patti: 50–60% 70–80%
U.S. Representative before election
Jerry McNerney (Democrat)
Josh Harder (Democrat)
Elected U.S. Representative
Josh Harder (Democrat)

Democrat Jerry McNerney, who had represented the district since 2013, was re-elected with 57.6% of the vote in 2020. McNerney decided to retire rather than seek re-election, and fellow Democrat Josh Harder then switched to run in this district.

=== Candidates ===
==== Advanced to general ====
- Josh Harder (Democratic), incumbent U.S. representative
- Tom Patti (Republican), chair of the San Joaquin County Board of Supervisors

==== Eliminated in primary ====
- Mark Andrews (no party preference), businessman
- Harpreet Chima (Democratic), union organizer and researcher
- Karena Feng (Democratic), political consultant
- Khalid Jafri (Democratic), engineer and farmer
- Jonathan Madison (Republican), business owner and former staffer for U.S. representative
- Jim Shoemaker (Republican), businessman

==== Declined ====
- José M. Hernández (Democratic), astronaut and candidate for the 10th district in 2012
- Jerry McNerney (Democratic), incumbent U.S. representative

=== Endorsements ===
Josh Harder (D)

Organizations

- American Israel Public Affairs Committee
- End Citizens United
- Equality California
- Feminist Majority PAC
- Giffords
- League of Conservation Voters Action Fund
- NARAL Pro-Choice America
- Planned Parenthood Action Fund
- Sierra Club

Labor unions

- SEIU California
- United Auto Workers
- United Farm Workers

Newspapers

- The Mercury News (post-primary)

=== General election ===
==== Predictions ====
Source	Ranking	As of
The Cook Political Report	Lean D	November 1, 2022
Inside Elections	Likely D	July 15, 2022
Sabato's Crystal Ball	Lean D	July 13, 2022
Politico	Lean D	August 12, 2022
RCP	Tossup	October 27, 2022
Fox News	Lean D	July 11, 2022
DDHQ	Likely D	July 20, 2022
538	Likely D	November 5, 2022
The Economist	Likely D	September 7, 2022

==== Polling ====
Poll source	Date(s) administered	Sample size	Margin of error	Josh Harder (D)	Tom Patti (R)	Other	Undecided
RMG Research	July 19–26, 2022	400 (LV)	± 4.9%	38%	38%	3%	21%

=== Results ===
California's 9th congressional district, 2022
Primary election
Party	Candidate	Votes	%
Democratic	Josh Harder (incumbent)	39,026	36.7
Republican	Tom Patti	30,843	29.0
Republican	Jim Shoemaker	15,443	14.5
Democratic	Harpreet Chima	8,433	7.9
Republican	Jonathan Madison	5,992	5.6
Democratic	Khalid Jafri	3,174	3.0
Democratic	Karena Feng	2,632	2.5
No party preference	Mark Andrews	758	0.7
Total votes		106,301	100.0
General election
Democratic	Josh Harder (incumbent)	95,598	54.8
Republican	Tom Patti	78,802	45.2
Total votes		174,400	100.0
Democratic hold			

==== By county ====
County	Josh Harder Democratic		Tom Patti Republican		Margin		Total votes cast
County	#	%	#	%	#	%	Total votes cast
Contra Costa (part)	2,788	41.94%	3,860	58.06%	−1,072	−16.13%	6,648
San Joaquin (part)	92,603	55.43%	74,445	44.57%	18,158	10.87%	167,048
Stanislaus (part)	207	29.40%	497	70.60%	−290	−41.19%	704
Totals	95,598	54.82%	78,802	45.18%	16,796	9.63%	174,400

== District 10 ==
2022 California's 10th congressional district election
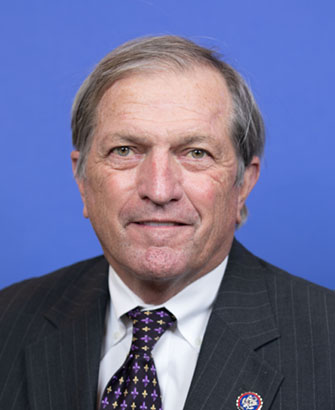

Candidate	Mark DeSaulnier	Michael Kerr
Party	Democratic	Green
Popular vote	198,415	52,965
Percentage	78.9%	21.1%
- County results DeSaulnier: 70–80%
U.S. Representative before election
Mark DeSaulnier
Democratic
Elected U.S. Representative
Mark DeSaulnier
Democratic

Due to redistricting, the incumbent changed from Democrat Josh Harder to fellow Democrat Mark DeSaulnier. DeSaulnier, who had represented the 11th district since 2015, was re-elected with 73.0% of the vote in 2020. DeSaulnier was running for re-election.

=== Candidates ===
==== Advanced to general ====
- Mark DeSaulnier (Democratic), incumbent U.S. representative
- Michael Ernest Kerr (Green), social justice advocate

=== Endorsements ===
Mark DeSaulnier (D)

Organizations

- California Environmental Voters
- Planned Parenthood Action Fund

Labor unions

- United Auto Workers
- United Farm Workers

=== General election ===
==== Predictions ====
Source	Ranking	As of
The Cook Political Report	Solid D	December 21, 2021
Inside Elections	Solid D	December 28, 2021
Sabato's Crystal Ball	Safe D	January 4, 2022
Politico	Solid D	April 5, 2022
RCP	Safe D	June 9, 2022
Fox News	Solid D	July 11, 2022
DDHQ	Solid D	July 20, 2022
538	Solid D	June 30, 2022
The Economist	Safe D	September 7, 2022

=== Results ===
California's 10th congressional district, 2022
Primary election
Party	Candidate	Votes	%
Democratic	Mark DeSaulnier (incumbent)	124,787	84.0
Green	Michael Ernest Kerr	22,210	14.9
Republican	Katherine Piccinini (write-in)	1,638	1.1
Total votes		148,635	100.0
General election
Democratic	Mark DeSaulnier (incumbent)	198,415	78.9
Green	Michael Ernest Kerr	52,965	21.1
Total votes		251,380	100.0
Democratic hold			

==== By county ====
County	Mark DeSaulnier Democratic		Michael Kerr Green		Margin		Total votes cast
County	#	%	#	%	#	%	Total votes cast
Alameda (part)	8,247	77.44%	2,403	22.56%	5,844	54.87%	10,650
Contra Costa (part)	190,168	79.00%	50,562	21.00%	139,606	57.99%	240,730
Totals	198,415	78.93%	52,965	21.07%	145,450	57.86%	251,380

== District 11 ==
2022 California's 11th congressional district election
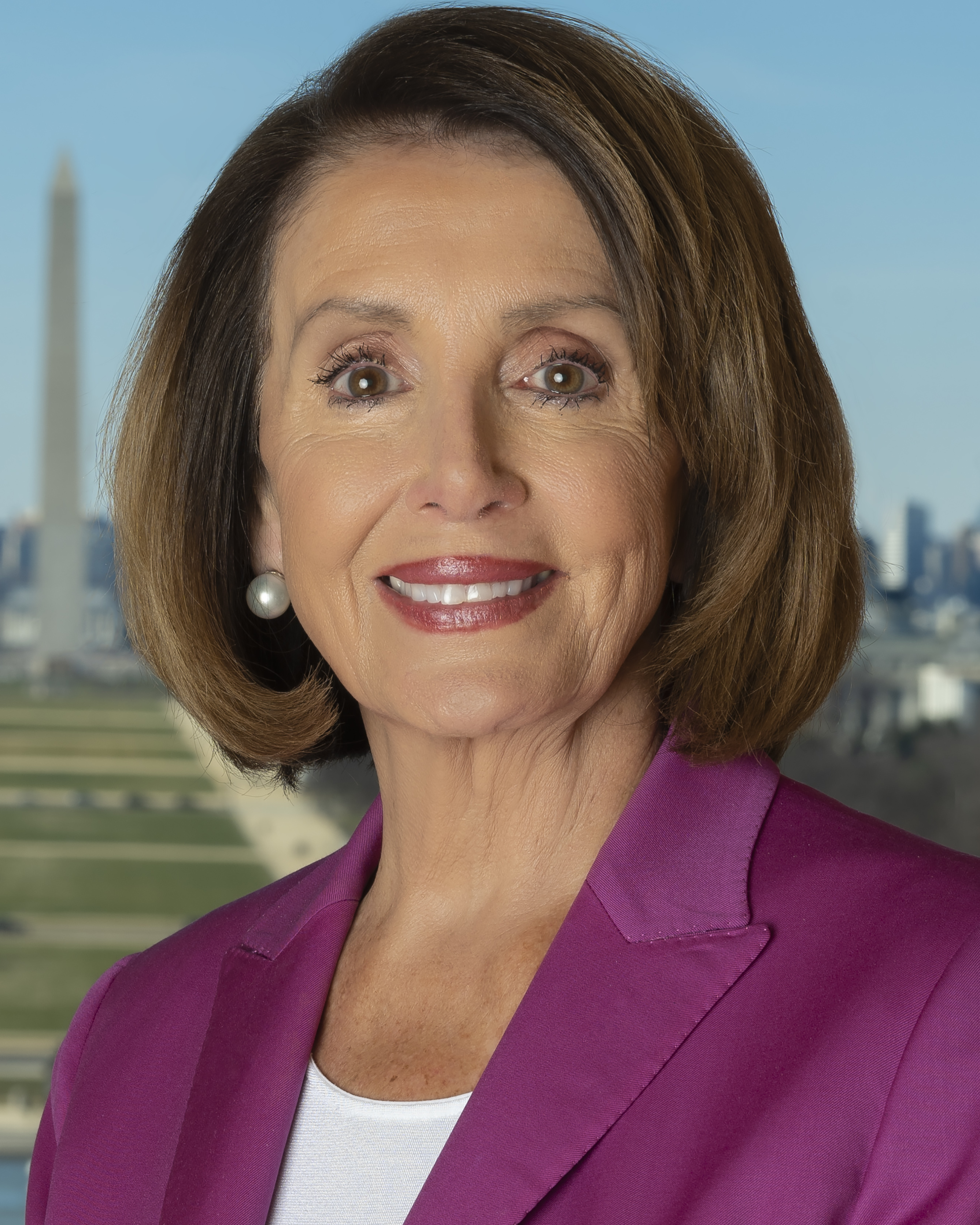

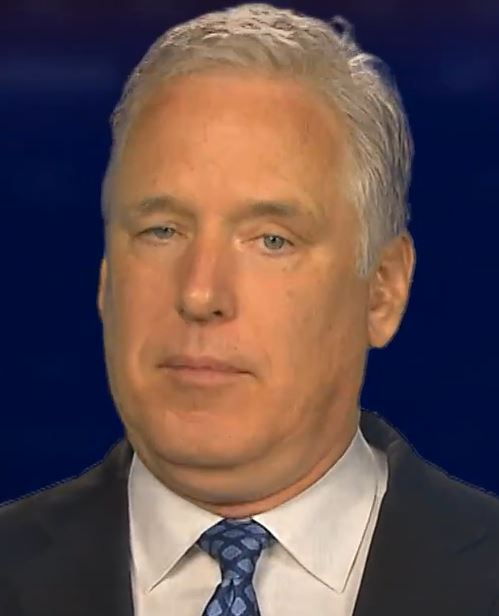
Candidate	Nancy Pelosi	John Dennis
Party	Democratic	Republican
Popular vote	220,848	42,217
Percentage	84.0%	16.0%
- County results Pelosi: 80–90%
U.S. Representative before election
Nancy Pelosi
Democratic
Elected U.S. Representative
Nancy Pelosi
Democratic

Due to redistricting, the incumbent changed from Democrat Mark DeSaulnier to fellow Democrat Nancy Pelosi. Pelosi, who had represented the 12th district since 2013, was re-elected with 77.6% of the vote in 2020. Pelosi was running for re-election.

=== Candidates ===
==== Advanced to general ====
- John Dennis (Republican), businessman and perennial candidate
- Nancy Pelosi (Democratic), incumbent U.S. representative and former Speaker of the House

==== Eliminated in primary ====
- Shahid Buttar, attorney, candidate for this district in 2018, and runner-up in 2020
- Eve Del Castello, business consultant
- Jeffrey Phillips (Democratic), progressive activist
- Bianca von Krieg (Democratic), model and actress

==== Declined ====
- Joseph Roberts (Republican)

=== Endorsements ===
Shahid Buttar (D)

Individuals

- Marianne Williamson, author and candidate for president of the United States in 2020
Nancy Pelosi (D)

Organizations

- California Environmental Voters
- End Citizens United
- Feminist Majority PAC
- League of Conservation Voters
- NARAL Pro-Choice America
- Natural Resources Defense Council
- Planned Parenthood Action Fund
- Sierra Club

Labor unions

- SEIU California
- United Auto Workers
- United Farm Workers

=== General election ===
==== Predictions ====
Source	Ranking	As of
The Cook Political Report	Solid D	December 21, 2021
Inside Elections	Solid D	December 28, 2021
Sabato's Crystal Ball	Safe D	January 4, 2022
Politico	Solid D	April 5, 2022
RCP	Safe D	June 9, 2022
Fox News	Solid D	July 11, 2022
DDHQ	Solid D	July 20, 2022
538	Solid D	June 30, 2022
The Economist	Safe D	September 7, 2022

=== Results ===
California's 11th congressional district, 2022
Primary election
Party	Candidate	Votes	%
Democratic	Nancy Pelosi (incumbent)	133,798	71.7
Republican	John Dennis	20,054	10.7
Democratic	Shahid Buttar	19,471	10.4
Republican	Eve Del Castello	7,319	3.9
Democratic	Jeffrey Phillips	3,595	1.9
Democratic	Bianca Von Krieg	2,499	1.3
Total votes		186,736	100.0
General election
Democratic	Nancy Pelosi (incumbent)	220,848	84.0
Republican	John Dennis	42,217	16.0
Total votes		263,065	100.0
Democratic hold			

==== By county ====
County	Nancy Pelosi Democratic		John Dennis Republican		Margin		Total votes cast
County	#	%	#	%	#	%	Total votes cast
San Francisco (part)	220,848	83.95%	42,217	16.05%	178,631	67.90%	263,065
Totals	220,848	83.95%	42,217	16.05%	178,631	67.90%	263,065

== District 12 ==
2022 California's 12th congressional district election
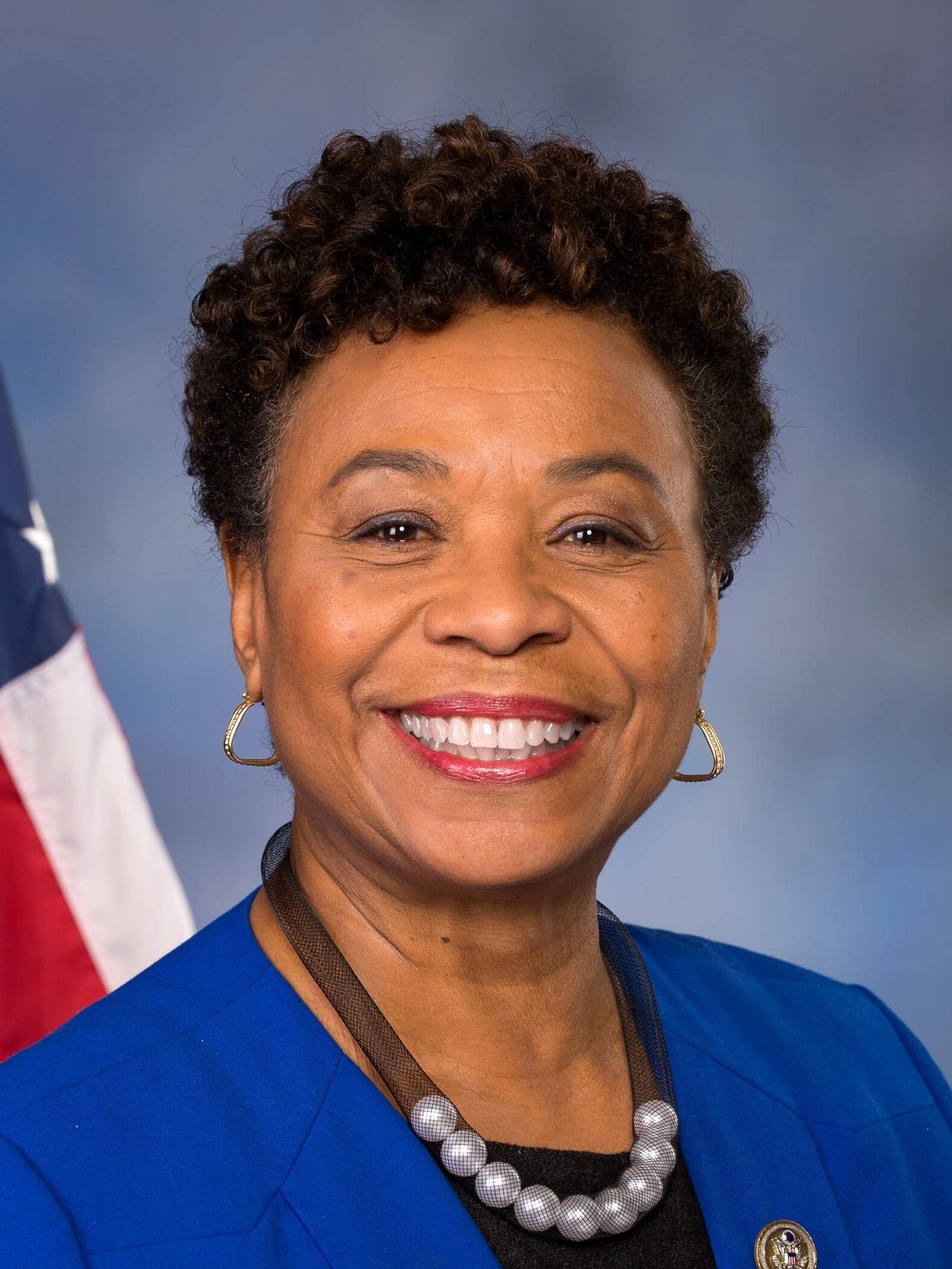

Candidate	Barbara Lee	Stephen Slauson
Party	Democratic	Republican
Popular vote	217,110	22,859
Percentage	90.5%	9.5%
- Block group results Lee: 60–70% 70–80% 80–90% 90–100% No results
U.S. Representative before election
Barbara Lee
Democratic
Elected U.S. Representative
Barbara Lee
Democratic

Due to redistricting, the incumbent changed from Democrat Nancy Pelosi to fellow Democrat Barbara Lee. Lee, who had represented the 13th district since 2013, was re-elected with 90.4% of the vote in 2020. Lee was running for re-election.

=== Candidates ===
==== Advanced to general ====
- Barbara Lee (Democratic), incumbent U.S. representative
- Stephen Slauson (Republican), electrical engineer

==== Eliminated in primary ====
- Glenn Kaplan (no party preference), small business owner
- Ned Nuerge (Republican), retired driving instructor
- Eric Wilson (Democratic), nonprofit organization employee

=== Endorsements ===
Barbara Lee (D)

Organizations

- California Environmental Voters
- Feminist Majority PAC
- NARAL Pro-Choice America
- Planned Parenthood Action Fund
- Progressive Democrats of America
- Sierra Club

Labor unions

- National Women's Political Caucus
- SEIU California
- United Auto Workers
- United Farm Workers

=== General election ===
==== Prediction ====
Source	Ranking	As of
The Cook Political Report	Solid D	December 21, 2021
Inside Elections	Solid D	December 28, 2021
Sabato's Crystal Ball	Safe D	January 4, 2022
Politico	Solid D	April 5, 2022
RCP	Safe D	June 9, 2022
Fox News	Solid D	July 11, 2022
DDHQ	Solid D	July 20, 2022
538	Solid D	June 30, 2022
The Economist	Safe D	September 7, 2022

=== Results ===
California's 12th congressional district, 2022
Primary election
Party	Candidate	Votes	%
Democratic	Barbara Lee (incumbent)	135,892	87.7
Republican	Stephen Slauson	8,274	5.3
No party preference	Glenn Kaplan	5,141	3.3
Democratic	Eric Wilson	3,753	2.4
Republican	Ned Nuerge	1,902	1.2
Total votes		154,962	100.0
General election
Democratic	Barbara Lee (incumbent)	217,110	90.5
Republican	Stephen Slauson	22,859	9.5
Total votes		239,969	100.0
Democratic hold			

==== By county ====
County	Barbara Lee Democratic		Stephen Slauson Republican		Margin		Total votes cast
County	#	%	#	%	#	%	Total votes cast
Alameda (part)	217,110	90.47%	22,859	9.53%	194,251	80.95%	239,969
Totals	217,110	90.47%	22,859	9.53%	194,251	80.95%	239,969

== District 13 ==
2022 California's 13th congressional district election
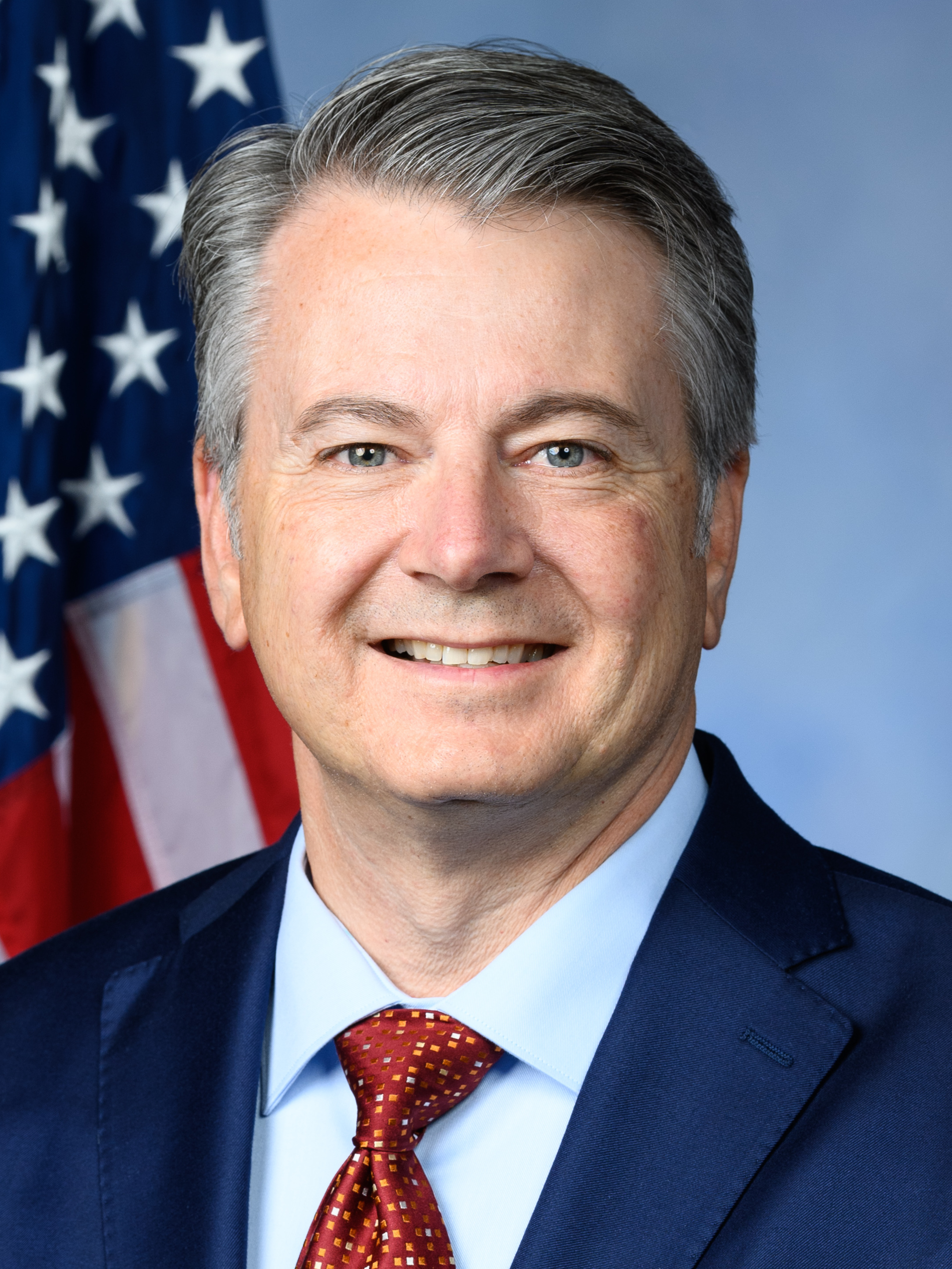

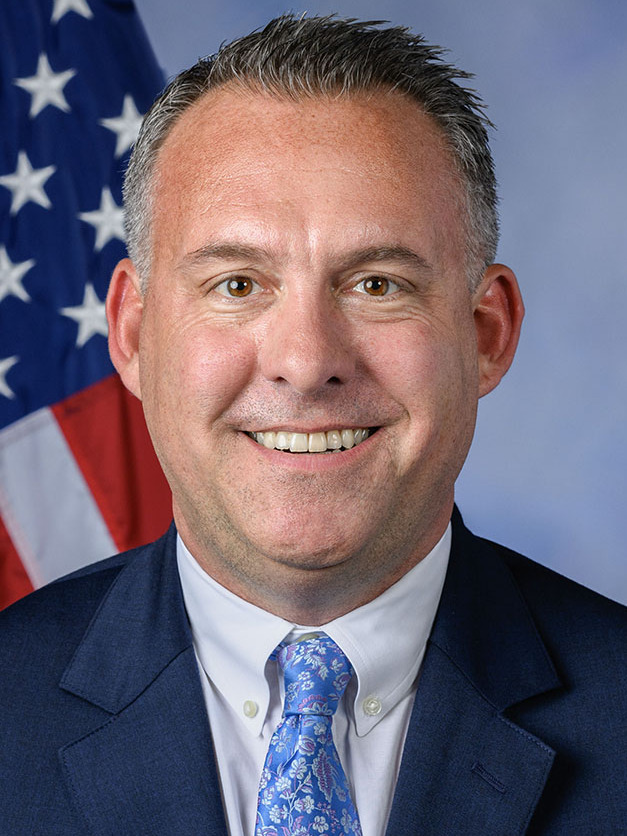
Candidate	John Duarte	Adam Gray
Party	Republican	Democratic
Popular vote	67,060	66,496
Percentage	50.2%	49.8%
- Duarte: 50–60% 60–70% 70–80% 80–90% 90–100% Gray: 50–60% 60–70% 70–80% 90–100%
U.S. Representative before election
None (New seat)
Elected U.S. Representative
John Duarte
Republican

Due to redistricting, the incumbent changed from Democrat Barbara Lee to fellow Democrat Josh Harder. Harder, who had represented the 10th district since 2019, was re-elected with 55.2% of the vote in 2020. Harder was running for re-election in District 9, leaving this seat open. On December 2, the race was called for Duarte, leading with a margin of 564 raw votes.

=== Candidates ===
==== Advanced to general ====
- John Duarte (Republican), pistachio farmer and businessman
- Adam Gray (Democratic), state assemblyman

==== Eliminated in primary ====
- Phil Arballo (Democratic), financial advisor and runner-up for California's 22nd congressional district in 2020
- David Giglio (Republican), businessman
- Diego Martinez (Republican), businessman and candidate for governor in the 2021 recall election

==== Withdrew ====
- Simon Aslanpour (Republican), florist
- Michael Barkley (Democratic), attorney, U.S. Navy veteran, and perennial candidate
- Jolene Daly (Republican), psychologist
- Ricky Gill (Republican), former member of the U.S. National Security Council and the California State Board of Education and runner-up for the 9th district in 2012 (ran for the 5th district, then withdrew entirely)
- Jake Griffith (Republican), U.S. Army veteran
- Josh Harder (Democratic), incumbent U.S. representative (running in the 9th district)
- Sean Harrison (Republican), clinic patient advocate manager
- Elizabeth Heng (Republican), tech entrepreneur and runner-up for the 16th district in 2018
- Eugene Rubio Kilbride (Republican), attorney and U.S. Army veteran
- Angelina Sigala (Democratic), teacher
- Matt Stoll (Republican)

==== Declined ====
- Anna Caballero (Democratic), state senator
- Andrew Janz (Democratic), Fresno County prosecutor, runner-up for the 22nd district in 2018, and candidate for mayor of Fresno in 2020

=== Endorsements ===
Adam Gray (D)

Federal officials

- Jim Costa, U.S. representative
- Alex Padilla, U.S. senator from California

State officials

- Gavin Newsom, governor of California (2019–present)

Organizations

- Blue Dog PAC
- New Democrat Coalition Action Fund (post-primary)
Phil Arballo (D)

Individuals

- Jane Fonda, actress and activist

Organizations

- California Environmental Voters
- League of Conservation Voters Action Fund

Labor unions

- SEIU California

=== General election ===
==== Debates and forums ====
2022 California's 13th congressional district general election debates and forums
No.	Date	Host	Moderator	Link	Participants	
P Participant A Absent N Non-invitee I Invitee W Withdrawn						
P Participant A Absent N Non-invitee I Invitee W Withdrawn					Gray	Duarte
1	September 26, 2022	McClatchy	Garth Stapley & Joe Kieta		P	P

==== Predictions ====
Source	Ranking	As of
The Cook Political Report	Tossup	June 28, 2022
Inside Elections	Tossup	November 3, 2022
Sabato's Crystal Ball	Lean R (flip)	November 7, 2022
Politico	Lean R (flip)	November 7, 2022
RCP	Tossup	June 9, 2022
Fox News	Tossup	July 11, 2022
DDHQ	Tossup	October 17, 2022
538	Lean D	October 19, 2022
The Economist	Lean D	September 7, 2022

==== Polling ====
Poll source	Date(s) administered	Sample size	Margin of error	Adam Gray (D)	John Duarte (R)	Other	Undecided
Moore Information Group (R) (Note: Poll sponsored jointly by the National Republican Congressional Committee and Duarte's campaign committee)	August 3–7, 2022	400 (LV)	± 4.9%	47%	43%	–	10%
RMG Research	July 26 – August 2, 2022	400 (LV)	± 4.9%	37%	37%	4%	23%

Hypothetical polling

Generic Democrat vs. generic Republican

Poll source	Date(s) administered	Sample size	Margin of error	Generic Democrat	Generic Republican	Undecided
Public Policy Polling (D) (Note: This poll was sponsored by the House Majority PAC.)	October 18, 2022	–	–	40%	37%	23%
Moore Information Group (R)	August 3–7, 2022	400 (LV)	± 4.9%	46%	43%	11%

=== Results ===
California's 13th congressional district, 2022
Primary election
Party	Candidate	Votes	%
Republican	John Duarte	26,163	34.2
Democratic	Adam Gray	23,784	31.1
Democratic	Phil Arballo	13,099	17.1
Republican	David Giglio	11,320	14.8
Republican	Diego Martinez	2,026	2.7
Total votes		76,392	100.0
General election
Republican	John Duarte	67,060	50.2
Democratic	Adam Gray	66,496	49.8
Total votes		133,556	100.0
Republican win (new seat)			

==== By county ====
County	John Duarte Republican		Adam Gray Democratic		Margin		Total votes cast
County	#	%	#	%	#	%	Total votes cast
Fresno (part)	7,415	54.91%	6,089	45.09%	1,326	9.82%	13,504
Madera (part)	12,642	58.38%	9,011	41.62%	3,631	16.77%	21,653
Merced	26,108	47.74%	28,577	52.26%	-2,469	-4.51%	54,685
San Joaquin (part)	4,092	47.09%	4,597	52.91%	-505	-5.81%	8,689
Stanislaus (part)	16,803	47.97%	18,222	52.03%	-1,419	-4.05%	35,025
Totals	67,060	50.21%	66,496	49.79%	564	0.42%	133,556

== District 14 ==
2022 California's 14th congressional district election
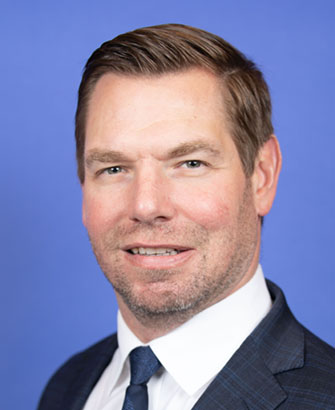

Candidate	Eric Swalwell	Alison Hayden
Party	Democratic	Republican
Popular vote	137,612	60,852
Percentage	69.3%	30.7%
- Block group results Swalwell: 50–60% 60–70% 70–80% 80–90% Hayden: 50–60% 60–70%
U.S. Representative before election
Eric Swalwell
Democratic
Elected U.S. Representative
Eric Swalwell
Democratic

Due to redistricting, 14th district incumbent Jackie Speier and 15th district incumbent Eric Swalwell, both Democrats, swapped districts. Swalwell, who had represented the 15th district since 2013, was re-elected with 70.9% of the vote in 2020.

=== Candidates ===
==== Advanced to general ====
- Alison Hayden (Republican), special education teacher and runner-up for this district in 2020
- Eric Swalwell (Democratic), incumbent U.S. representative

==== Eliminated in primary ====
- Sri "Steve" Iyer (Republican), international renewables executive
- James Peters (Democrat), team builder and waiter
- Liam Miguel Simard (no party preference)
- Major Singh (no party preference)
- Tom Wong (Republican), small business owner

=== Endorsements ===
Eric Swalwell (D)

Organizations

- California Environmental Voters
- Planned Parenthood Action Fund

Labor unions

- United Auto Workers

=== General election ===
==== Predictions ====
Source	Ranking	As of
The Cook Political Report	Solid D	December 21, 2021
Inside Elections	Solid D	December 28, 2021
Sabato's Crystal Ball	Safe D	January 4, 2022
Politico	Solid D	April 5, 2022
RCP	Safe D	June 9, 2022
Fox News	Solid D	July 11, 2022
DDHQ	Solid D	July 20, 2022
538	Solid D	June 30, 2022
The Economist	Safe D	September 7, 2022

=== Results ===
California's 14th congressional district, 2022
Primary election
Party	Candidate	Votes	%
Democratic	Eric Swalwell (incumbent)	77,120	63.6
Republican	Alison Hayden	12,503	10.3
Republican	Tom Wong	11,406	9.4
Republican	Sri "Steve" Iyer	10,829	8.9
Democratic	James Peters	6,216	5.1
No party preference	Major Singh	2,495	2.1
No party preference	Liam Miguel Simard	657	0.5
Total votes		121,226	100.0
General election
Democratic	Eric Swalwell (incumbent)	137,612	69.3
Republican	Alison Hayden	60,852	30.7
Total votes		198,464	100.0
Democratic hold			

==== By county ====
County	Eric Swallwell Democratic		Alison Hayden Republican		Margin		Total votes cast
County	#	%	#	%	#	%	Total votes cast
Alameda (part)	137,612	69.34%	60,852	30.66%	76,760	38.68%	198,464
Totals	137,612	69.34%	60,852	30.66%	76,760	38.68%	198,464

== District 15 ==
2022 California's 15th congressional district election
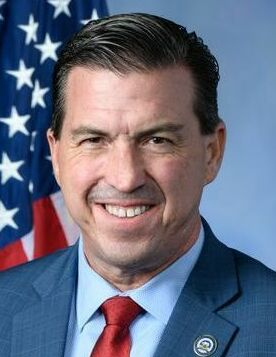

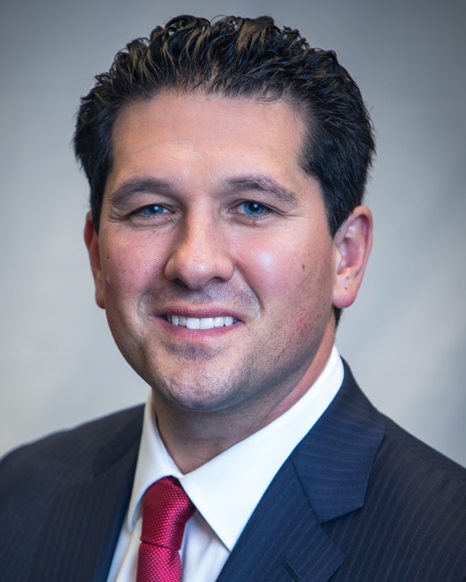
Candidate	Kevin Mullin	David Canepa
Party	Democratic	Democratic
Popular vote	108,077	86,797
Percentage	55.5%	44.5%
- County results Mullin: 50–60%
U.S. Representative before election
Jackie Speier
Democratic
Elected U.S. Representative
Kevin Mullin
Democratic

Due to redistricting, 14th district incumbent Jackie Speier and 15th district incumbent Eric Swalwell, both Democrats, swapped districts. Jackie Speier, who had represented the 14th district since 2013, was re-elected with 79.3% of the vote in 2020. In November 2021, Speier announced that she would not seek reelection after her next term.

=== Candidates ===
==== Advanced to general ====
- David Canepa (Democratic), San Mateo County supervisor
- Kevin Mullin (Democratic), speaker pro tempore of the California State Assembly

==== Eliminated in primary ====
- Emily Beach (Democratic), Burlingame city councilmember and U.S. Army veteran
- Jim Garety (no party preference), security safety manager
- Gus Mattammal (Republican), math teacher
- Ferenc Pataki (no party preference), realtor
- Andrew Watters (Democratic), attorney

==== Declined ====
- Josh Becker (Democratic), state senator
- Rick Bonilla (unknown), San Mateo city councilor
- David Brandt (no party preference)
- Giselle Hale (Democratic), mayor of Redwood City (ran for state assembly)
- Davina Hurt (unknown), Belmont city councilor
- Shelly Masur (Democratic), former Redwood City councilor
- Diane Papan (Democratic), San Mateo city councilor (ran for state assembly)
- Gina Papan (unknown), Millbrae city councilor
- Adam Rak (unknown), San Carlos city councilor
- Jackie Speier (Democratic), incumbent U.S. representative (endorsed Kevin Mullin)

=== Endorsements ===
Emily Beach (D)

Organizations

- New Politics
David Canepa (D)

Municipal officials

- Myrna Melgar, member of the San Francisco Board of Supervisors from the 7th District (2021–present)
Kevin Mullin (D)

U.S. representatives

- Jackie Speier, U.S. representative for California's 14th congressional district (2008–present)

State officials

- Rob Bonta, Attorney General of California (2021–present)
- Fiona Ma, California State Treasurer (2019–present)

State legislators

- Rich Gordon, former state assemblymember from the 24th District (2010–2016)
- Jerry Hill, former state senator from the 13th District (2012–2020)
- Alex Lee, state assemblymember from the 25th District (2014–present)
- Evan Low, state assemblymember from the 28th District (2020–present)
- Anthony Rendon, Speaker of the California State Assembly (2016–present) from the 63rd District (2012–present)
- Scott Wiener, state senator from the 11th District (2016–present)

County officials

- Dave Pine, San Mateo County supervisor (2011–present)

Organizations

- California Environmental Voters
- Equality California
- NARAL Pro-Choice America
- Sierra Club

Labor unions

- SEIU California
- United Auto Workers
- United Farm Workers

=== Primary election ===
==== Polling ====
Poll source	Date(s) administered	Sample size	Margin of error	Emily Beach (D)	David Canepa (D)	Jim Garrity (I)	Gus Mattamal (R)	Kevin Mullin (D)	Ferenc Pataki (I)	Andrew Watters (D)	Other	Undecided
RMG Research	May 19–20, 2022	500 (LV)	± 4.5%	4%	9%	–	–	16%	–	–	16%	54%
FM3 Research (D) (Note: Poll sponsored by Mullin's campaign)	Mar 27–30, 2022	427 (LV)	± 4.9%	8%	17%	3%	9%	31%	5%	1%	–	27%
Tulchin Research (D) (Note: Poll sponsored by Canepa's campaign)	Feb 1–6, 2022	500 (LV)	± 4.4%	7%	19%	–	13%	17%	–	2%	–	43%

=== General election ===
==== Predictions ====
Source	Ranking	As of
The Cook Political Report	Solid D	December 21, 2021
Inside Elections	Solid D	December 28, 2021
Sabato's Crystal Ball	Safe D	January 4, 2022
Politico	Solid D	April 5, 2022
RCP	Safe D	June 9, 2022
Fox News	Solid D	July 11, 2022
DDHQ	Solid D	July 20, 2022
538	Solid D	June 30, 2022
The Economist	Safe D	September 7, 2022

=== Results ===
California's 15th congressional district, 2022
Primary election
Party	Candidate	Votes	%
Democratic	Kevin Mullin	58,806	41.1
Democratic	David Canepa	34,488	24.1
Republican	Gus Mattammal	23,625	16.5
Democratic	Emily Beach	20,816	14.6
No party preference	Jim Garrity	3,081	2.2
Democratic	Andrew G. Watters	1,551	1.1
No party preference	Ferenc Pataki	671	0.5
Total votes		143,038	100.0
General election
Democratic	Kevin Mullin	108,077	55.5
Democratic	David Canepa	86,797	44.5
Total votes		194,874	100.0
Democratic hold			

==== By county ====
County	Kevin Mullin Democratic		David Canepa Democratic		Margin		Total votes cast
County	#	%	#	%	#	%	Total votes cast
San Francisco (part)	12,204	50.15%	12,132	49.85%	72	0.30%	24,336
San Mateo (part)	95,873	56.22%	74,665	43.78%	21,208	12.44%	170,538
Totals	108,077	55.46%	86,797	44.54%	21,280	10.92%	194,874

== District 16 ==
2022 California's 16th congressional district election
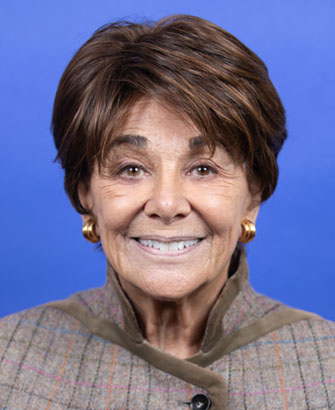

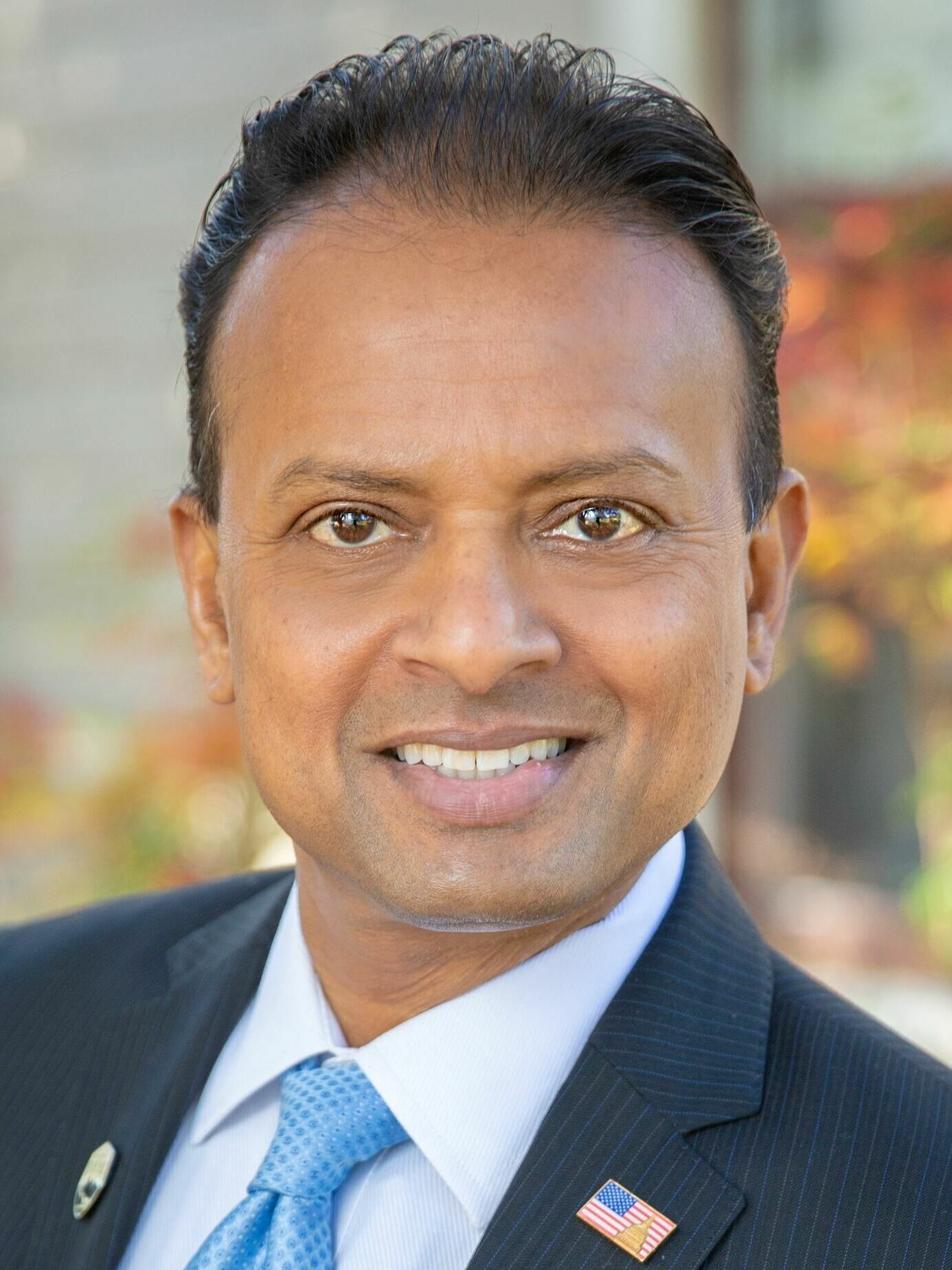
Candidate	Anna Eshoo	Rishi Kumar
Party	Democratic	Democratic
Popular vote	139,235	101,772
Percentage	57.8%	42.2%
- Eshoo: 50–60% 60–70% 70–80% Kumar: 50–60% 90–100% No results
U.S. Representative before election
Anna Eshoo
Democratic
Elected U.S. Representative
Anna Eshoo
Democratic

Due to redistricting, the incumbent changed from Democrat Jim Costa to fellow Democrat Anna Eshoo. Eshoo, who had represented the 18th district since 2013, was re-elected with 63.2% of the vote in 2020.

=== Candidates ===
==== Advanced to general ====
- Anna Eshoo (Democratic), incumbent U.S. representative
- Rishi Kumar (Democratic), Saratoga city councilor and runner-up for this district in 2020

==== Eliminated in primary ====
- Richard Fox (Republican), attorney and physician
- John Fredrich (no party preference), teacher
- Peter Ohtaki (Republican), former mayor of Menlo Park
- Ajwang Rading (Democratic), attorney
- Benjamin Solomon (Republican), fintech startup owner
- Greg Tanaka (Democratic), Palo Alto city councilor

=== Endorsements ===
Anna Eshoo (D)

Organizations

- California Environmental Voters
- Feminist Majority PAC
- Planned Parenthood Action Fund
- Sierra Club

Labor unions

- National Women's Political Caucus
- SEIU California
- United Auto Workers
Greg Tanaka (D)

Organizations

- Forward Party

=== General election ===
==== Predictions ====
Source	Ranking	As of
The Cook Political Report	Solid D	December 21, 2021
Inside Elections	Solid D	December 28, 2021
Sabato's Crystal Ball	Safe D	January 4, 2022
Politico	Solid D	April 5, 2022
RCP	Safe D	June 9, 2022
Fox News	Solid D	July 11, 2022
DDHQ	Solid D	July 20, 2022
538	Solid D	June 30, 2022
The Economist	Safe D	September 7, 2022

=== Results ===
California's 16th congressional district, 2022
Primary election
Party	Candidate	Votes	%
Democratic	Anna Eshoo (incumbent)	81,100	47.9
Democratic	Rishi Kumar	26,438	15.6
Republican	Peter Ohtaki	21,354	12.6
Republican	Richard Fox	13,187	7.8
Democratic	Ajwang Rading	11,418	6.7
Democratic	Greg Tanaka	11,107	6.6
Republican	Benjamin Solomon	2,659	1.6
No party preference	John Fredrich	2,120	1.3
Democratic	Travis Odekirk (write-in)	2	0.0
Total votes		169,385	100.0
General election
Democratic	Anna Eshoo (incumbent)	139,235	57.8
Democratic	Rishi Kumar	101,772	42.2
Total votes		241,007	100.0
Democratic hold			

==== By county ====
County	Anna Eshoo Democratic		Rishi Kumar Democratic		Margin		Total votes cast
County	#	%	#	%	#	%	Total votes cast
San Mateo (part)	29,474	59.69%	19,906	40.31%	9,568	19.38%	49,380
Santa Clara (part)	109,761	57.28%	81,866	42.72%	27,895	14.56%	191,627
Totals	139,235	57.77%	101,772	42.23%	37,463	15.54%	241,007

== District 17 ==
2022 California's 17th congressional district election
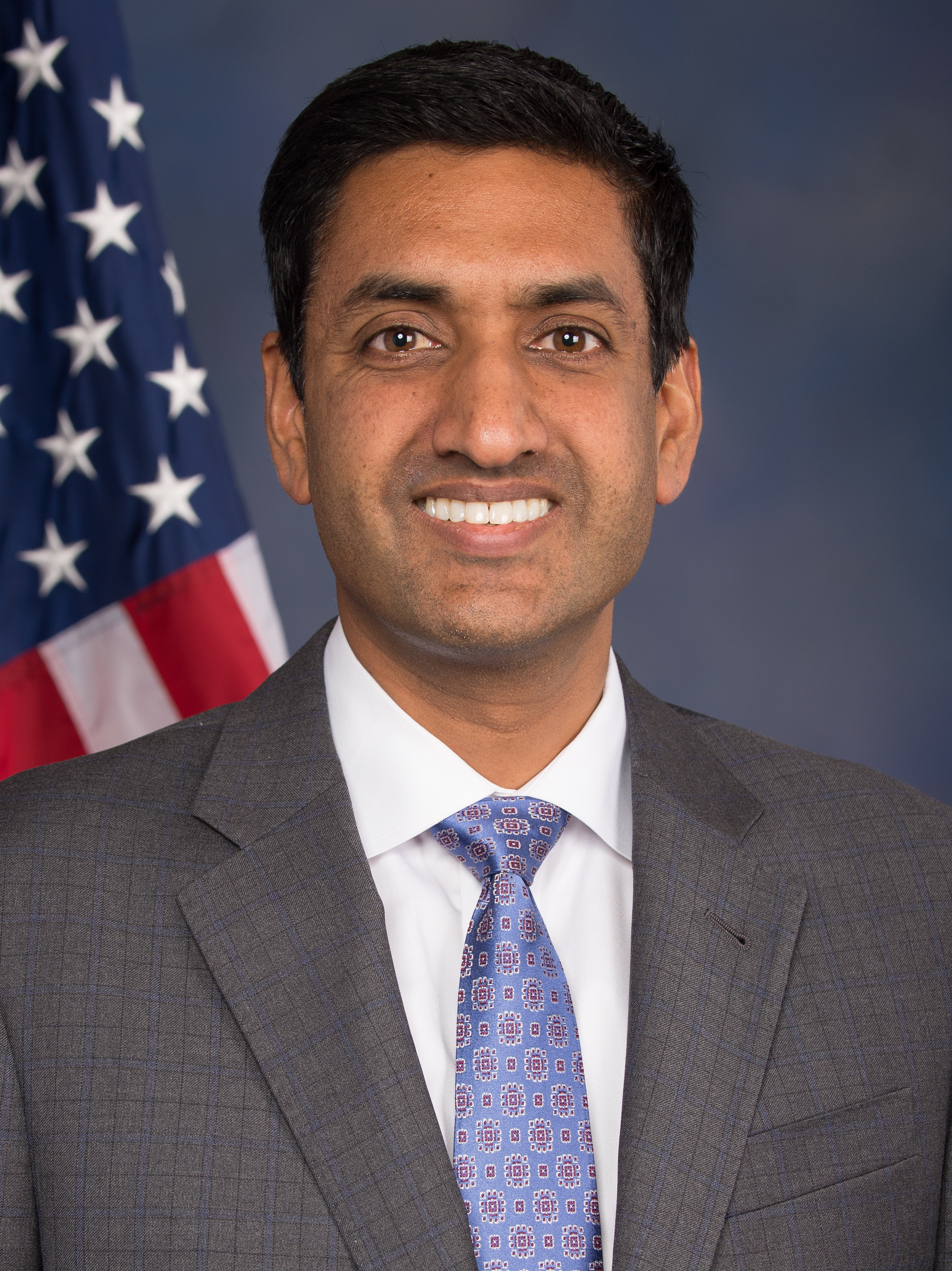

Candidate	Ro Khanna	Ritesh Tandon
Party	Democratic	Republican
Popular vote	127,853	52,400
Percentage	70.9%	29.1%
- Khanna: 50–60% 60–70% 70–80% 80–90% Tandon: 90–100% No votes
U.S. Representative before election
Ro Khanna
Democratic
Elected U.S. Representative
Ro Khanna
Democratic

Democrat Ro Khanna, who had represented the district since 2017, was re-elected with 71.3% of the vote in 2020. Khanna was running for re-election.

=== Candidates ===
==== Advanced to general ====
- Ro Khanna (Democratic), incumbent U.S. representative
- Ritesh Tandon (Republican), researcher, entrepreneur, and CEO

==== Eliminated in primary ====
- Joe Dehn (Libertarian), square dance caller
- Stephen Forbes (Democratic), accountant
- Rao Ravul (Democratic), investor and businessman

=== Endorsements ===
Ro Khanna (D)

Organizations

- California Environmental Voters
- Justice Democrats
- League of Conservation Voters
- Planned Parenthood Action Fund
- Progressive Democrats of America
- Sierra Club

Labor unions

- SEIU California
- United Auto Workers

=== General election ===
==== Predictions ====
Source	Ranking	As of
The Cook Political Report	Solid D	December 21, 2021
Inside Elections	Solid D	December 28, 2021
Sabato's Crystal Ball	Safe D	January 4, 2022
Politico	Solid D	April 5, 2022
RCP	Safe D	June 9, 2022
Fox News	Solid D	July 11, 2022
DDHQ	Solid D	July 20, 2022
538	Solid D	June 30, 2022
The Economist	Safe D	September 7, 2022

=== Results ===
California's 17th congressional district, 2022
Primary election
Party	Candidate	Votes	%
Democratic	Ro Khanna (incumbent)	74,892	66.0
Republican	Ritesh Tandon	28,730	25.3
Democratic	Stephen Forbes	5,694	5.0
Democratic	Rao Ravul	2,394	2.1
Libertarian	Joe Dehn	1,836	1.6
Total votes		113,546	100.0
General election
Democratic	Ro Khanna (incumbent)	127,853	70.9
Republican	Ritesh Tandon	52,400	29.1
Total votes		180,253	100.0
Democratic hold			

==== By county ====
County	Ro Khanna Democratic		Ritesh Tandon Republican		Margin		Total votes cast
County	#	%	#	%	#	%	Total votes cast
Alameda (part)	17,953	68.61%	8,214	31.39%	9,739	37.22%	26,167
Santa Clara (part)	109,900	71.32%	44,186	28.68%	65,714	42.65%	154,086
Totals	127,853	70.93%	52,400	29.07%	75,453	41.86%	180,253

== District 18 ==
2022 California's 18th congressional district election
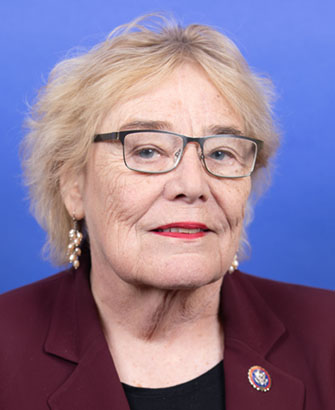

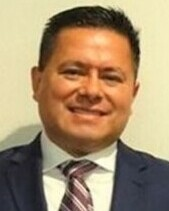
Candidate	Zoe Lofgren	Peter Hernandez
Party	Democratic	Republican
Popular vote	99,776	51,737
Percentage	65.9%	34.1%
- Lofgren: 50–60% 60–70% 70–80% 80–90% Hernandez: 50–60% 60–70% 70–80% 90–100% Tie: 50% No results
U.S. Representative before election
Zoe Lofgren
Democratic
Elected U.S. Representative
Zoe Lofgren
Democratic

Due to redistricting, the incumbent changed from Democrat Anna Eshoo to fellow Democrat Zoe Lofgren. Lofgren, who had represented the 19th district since 2013, was re-elected with 71.7% of the vote in 2020. Lofgren was running for re-election.

=== Candidates ===
==== Advanced to general ====
- Peter Hernandez (Republican), chair of the San Benito County Board of Supervisors
- Zoe Lofgren (Democratic), incumbent U.S. representative

==== Eliminated in primary ====
- Luis Acevedo-Arreguin (Democratic), U.S. citizenship instructor

=== Endorsements ===
Zoe Lofgren (D)

Organizations

- California Environmental Voters
- Feminist Majority PAC
- Planned Parenthood Action Fund
- Sierra Club

Labor unions

- SEIU California
- United Auto Workers
- United Farm Workers

=== General election ===
==== Predictions ====
Source	Ranking	As of
The Cook Political Report	Solid D	December 21, 2021
Inside Elections	Solid D	December 28, 2021
Sabato's Crystal Ball	Safe D	January 4, 2022
Politico	Solid D	April 5, 2022
RCP	Safe D	June 9, 2022
Fox News	Solid D	July 11, 2022
DDHQ	Solid D	July 20, 2022
538	Solid D	June 30, 2022
The Economist	Safe D	September 7, 2022

=== Results ===
California's 18th congressional district, 2022
Primary election
Party	Candidate	Votes	%
Democratic	Zoe Lofgren (incumbent)	50,104	56.1
Republican	Peter Hernandez	27,935	31.3
Democratic	Luis Acevedo-Arreguin	11,253	12.6
Total votes		89,292	100.0
General election
Democratic	Zoe Lofgren (incumbent)	99,776	65.9
Republican	Peter Hernandez	51,737	34.1
Total votes		151,513	100.0
Democratic hold			

==== By county ====
County	Zoe Lofgren Democratic		Peter Hernandez Republican		Margin		Total votes cast
County	#	%	#	%	#	%	Total votes cast
Monterey (part)	24,797	62.40%	14,940	37.60%	9,857	24.81%	39,737
San Benito	10,613	54.77%	8,763	45.23%	1,850	9.55%	19,376
Santa Clara (part)	55,595	69.28%	24,648	30.72%	30,947	38.57%	80,243
Santa Cruz (part)	8,771	72.15%	3,386	27.85%	5,385	44.30%	12,157
Totals	99,776	65.85%	51,737	34.15%	48,039	31.71%	151,513

== District 19 ==
2022 California's 19th congressional district election
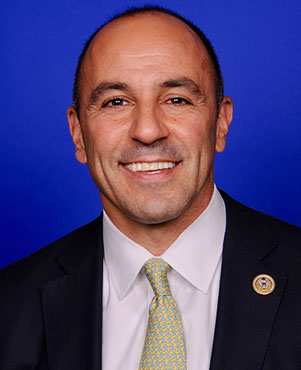

Candidate	Jimmy Panetta	Jeff Gorman
Party	Democratic	Republican
Popular vote	194,494	88,816
Percentage	68.7%	31.3%
- County results Panetta: 60–70% 70–80% 80–90% Gorman: 50–60%
U.S. Representative before election
Jimmy Panetta
Democratic
Elected U.S. Representative
Jimmy Panetta
Democratic

Due to redistricting, the incumbent changed from Democrat Zoe Lofgren to fellow Democrat Jimmy Panetta. Panetta, who had represented the 20th district since 2017, was re-elected with 76.8% of the vote in 2020.

=== Candidates ===
==== Advanced to general ====
- Jeff Gorman (Republican), small business owner
- Jimmy Panetta (Democratic), incumbent U.S. representative

==== Eliminated in primary ====
- Douglas Deitch (Democratic), water policy CEO
- Dalila Epperson (Republican), community organizer and retired nurse

=== Endorsements ===
Jimmy Panetta (D)

Organizations

- California Environmental Voters
- League of Conservation Voters Action Fund
- Planned Parenthood Action Fund
- Sierra Club

Labor unions

- SEIU California
- United Auto Workers

=== General election ===
==== Predictions ====
Source	Ranking	As of
The Cook Political Report	Solid D	December 21, 2021
Inside Elections	Solid D	December 28, 2021
Sabato's Crystal Ball	Safe D	January 4, 2022
Politico	Solid D	April 5, 2022
RCP	Safe D	June 9, 2022
Fox News	Solid D	July 11, 2022
DDHQ	Solid D	July 20, 2022
538	Solid D	June 30, 2022
The Economist	Safe D	September 7, 2022

=== Results ===
California's 19th congressional district, 2022
Primary election
Party	Candidate	Votes	%
Democratic	Jimmy Panetta (incumbent)	127,545	67.3
Republican	Jeff Gorman	44,181	23.3
Republican	Dalila Epperson	12,082	6.4
Democratic	Douglas Deitch	5,700	3.0
Total votes		189,508	100.0
General election
Democratic	Jimmy Panetta (incumbent)	194,494	68.7
Republican	Jeff Gorman	88,816	31.3
Total votes		283,310	100.0
Democratic hold			

==== By county ====
County	Jimmy Panetta Democratic		Jeff Gorman Republican		Margin		Total votes cast
County	#	%	#	%	#	%	Total votes cast
Monterey (part)	43,472	70.30%	18,365	29.70%	25,107	40.60%	61,837
San Luis Obispo (part)	18,983	44.84%	23,348	55.16%	−4,365	−10.31%	42,331
Santa Clara (part)	58,959	67.05%	28,975	32.95%	29,984	34.10%	87,934
Santa Cruz (part)	73,080	80.12%	18,128	19.88%	54,952	60.25%	91,208
Totals	194,494	68.65%	88,816	31.35%	105,678	37.30%	283,310

== District 20 ==
2022 California's 20th congressional district election
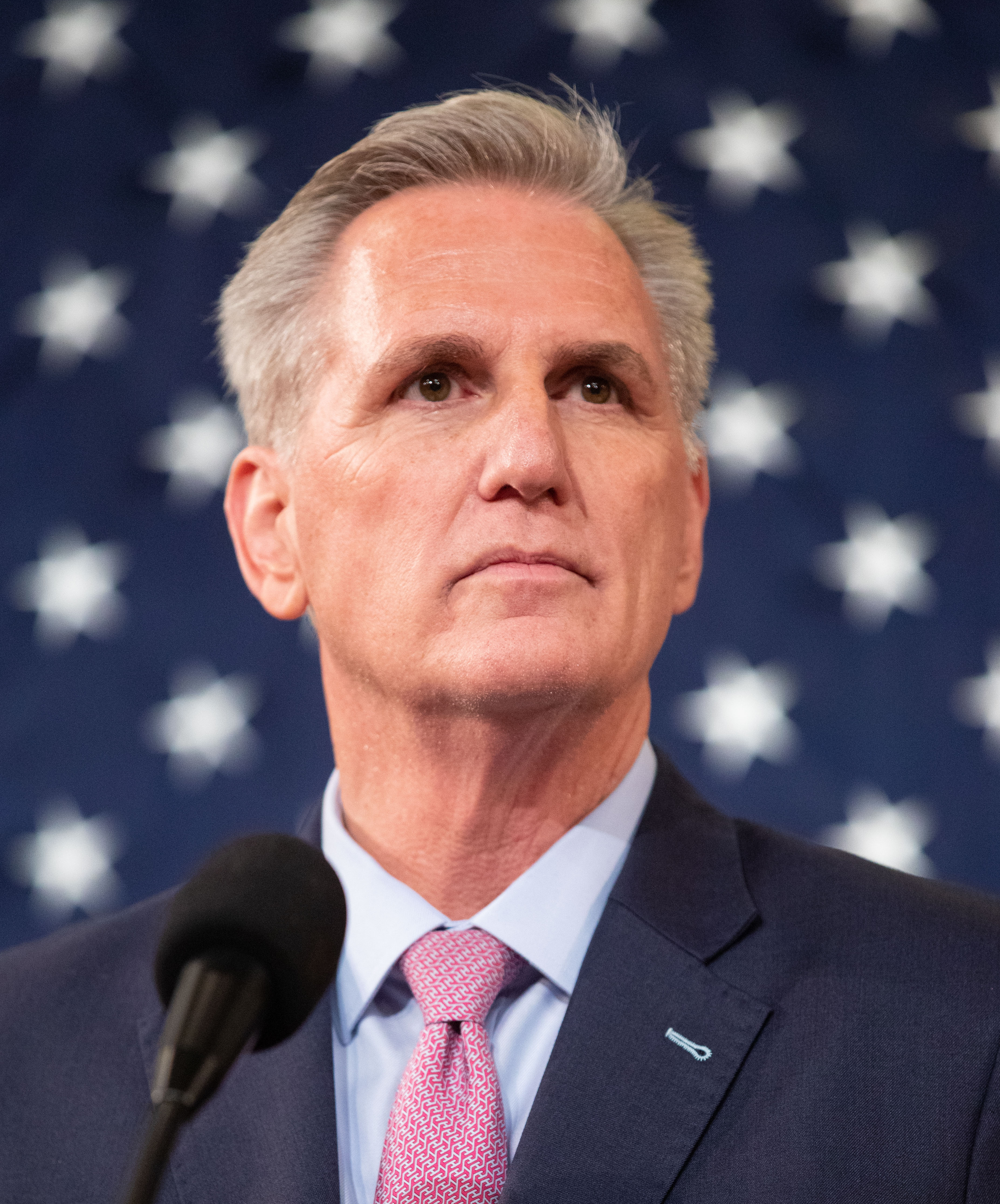

Candidate	Kevin McCarthy	Marisa Wood
Party	Republican	Democratic
Popular vote	153,847	74,934
Percentage	67.2%	32.8%
- County results McCarthy: 60–70%
U.S. Representative before election
Kevin McCarthy
Republican
Elected U.S. Representative
Kevin McCarthy
Republican

Due to redistricting, the incumbent changed from Democrat Jimmy Panetta to Republicans Kevin McCarthy and Connie Conway. McCarthy, who had represented the 23rd district since 2013, was re-elected with 62.1% of the vote in 2020. Conway, who was elected in a 2022 special election to replace Devin Nunes after his resignation to become CEO of Trump Media & Technology Group, declined to run for a full term.

=== Candidates ===
==== Advanced to general ====
- Kevin McCarthy (Republican), incumbent U.S. representative and House Minority Leader
- Marisa Wood (Democratic), teacher

==== Eliminated in primary ====
- James Davis (Republican), engineer, economist, and author
- Ben Dewell (Democratic), photographer
- James Macaulay (Republican), retired accountant

==== Withdrawn ====
- Bruno Amato (Democratic), actor and U.S. Navy veteran
- Louis Gill (Democratic), former non-profit CEO

==== Declined ====
- Connie Conway (Republican), incumbent U.S. representative (2022–2023)

==== Endorsements ====
Kevin McCarthy

Executive branch officials

- Donald Trump, former president of the United States (2017–2021)

Organizations

- Citizens for Responsible Energy Solutions

=== General election ===
==== Predictions ====
Source	Ranking	As of
The Cook Political Report	Solid R	December 21, 2021
Inside Elections	Solid R	December 28, 2021
Sabato's Crystal Ball	Safe R	January 4, 2022
Politico	Solid R	April 5, 2022
RCP	Safe R	June 9, 2022
Fox News	Solid R	July 11, 2022
DDHQ	Solid R	July 20, 2022
538	Solid R	June 30, 2022
The Economist	Safe R	September 7, 2022

=== Results ===
California's 20th congressional district, 2022
Primary election
Party	Candidate	Votes	%
Republican	Kevin McCarthy (incumbent)	85,748	61.3
Democratic	Marisa Wood	33,511	24.0
Democratic	Ben Dewell	8,757	6.3
Republican	James Davis	6,382	4.6
Republican	James Macaulay	5,488	3.9
Total votes		139,886	100.0
General election
Republican	Kevin McCarthy (incumbent)	153,847	67.2
Democratic	Marisa Wood	74,934	32.8
Total votes		228,781	100.0
Republican hold			

==== By county ====
County	Kevin McCarthy Republican		Marisa Wood Republican		Margin		Total votes cast
County	#	%	#	%	#	%	Total votes cast
Fresno (part)	40,914	64.40%	22,616	35.60%	18,298	28.80%	63,530
Kern (part)	80,962	68.86%	36,620	31.14%	44,342	37.71%	117,582
Kings (part)	9,959	68.76%	4,524	31.24%	5,435	37.53%	14,483
Tulare (part)	22,012	66.33%	11,174	33.67%	10,838	32.66%	33,186
Totals	153,847	67.25%	74,934	32.75%	78,913	34.49%	228,781

== District 21 ==
2022 California's 21st congressional district election
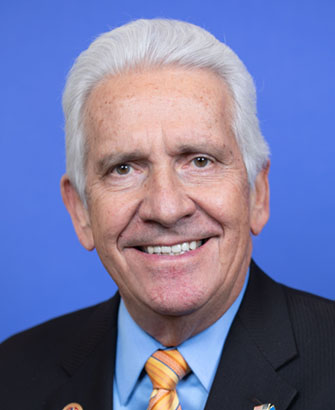

Candidate	Jim Costa	Michael Maher
Party	Democratic	Republican
Popular vote	68,074	57,573
Percentage	54.2%	45.8%
- County results Costa: 50–60% Maher: 50–60%
U.S. Representative before election
Jim Costa
Democratic
Elected U.S. Representative
Jim Costa
Democratic

Due to redistricting, the incumbent changed from Republican David Valadao to Democrat Jim Costa, who had represented the 16th district since 2013, and was re-elected with 59.4% of the vote in 2020. Costa was running for re-election.

=== Candidates ===
==== Advanced to general ====
- Jim Costa (Democratic), incumbent U.S. representative
- Michael Maher (Republican), aviation business owner

==== Eliminated in primary ====
- Eric Garcia (Democratic), therapist
- Matt Stoll (Republican), small business owner

==== Withdrew ====
- Nathan Brown (Republican), attorney

=== Endorsements ===
Jim Costa (D)

Organizations

- Planned Parenthood Action Fund

Labor unions

- United Auto Workers

=== General election ===
==== Predictions ====
Source	Ranking	As of
The Cook Political Report	Solid D	December 21, 2021
Inside Elections	Solid D	December 28, 2021
Sabato's Crystal Ball	Safe D	September 29, 2022
Politico	Solid D	April 5, 2022
RCP	Likely D	October 7, 2022
Fox News	Solid D	October 11, 2022
DDHQ	Solid D	July 20, 2022
538	Solid D	June 30, 2022
The Economist	Safe D	September 7, 2022

==== Polling ====
Poll source	Date(s) administered	Sample size	Margin of error	Jim Costa (D)	Michael Maher (R)	Undecided
The Trafalgar Group (R)	September 30 – October 3, 2022	515 (LV)	± 4.2%	44%	44%	12%

=== Results ===
California's 21st congressional district, 2022
Primary election
Party	Candidate	Votes	%
Democratic	Jim Costa (incumbent)	33,850	47.0
Republican	Michael Maher	19,040	26.4
Republican	Matt Stoll	11,931	16.6
Democratic	Eric Garcia	7,239	10.0
Total votes		72,060	100.0
General election
Democratic	Jim Costa (incumbent)	68,074	54.2
Republican	Michael Maher	57,573	45.8
Total votes		125,647	100.0
Democratic hold			

==== By county ====
County	Jim Costa Democratic		Michael Maher Republican		Margin		Total votes cast
County	#	%	#	%	#	%	Total votes cast
Fresno (part)	55,434	58.40%	39,494	41.60%	15,940	16.79%	94,928
Tulare (part)	12,640	41.15%	18,079	58.85%	−5,439	−17.71%	30,719
Totals	68,074	54.18%	57,573	45.82%	10,501	8.36%	125,647

== District 22 ==
2022 California's 22nd congressional district election
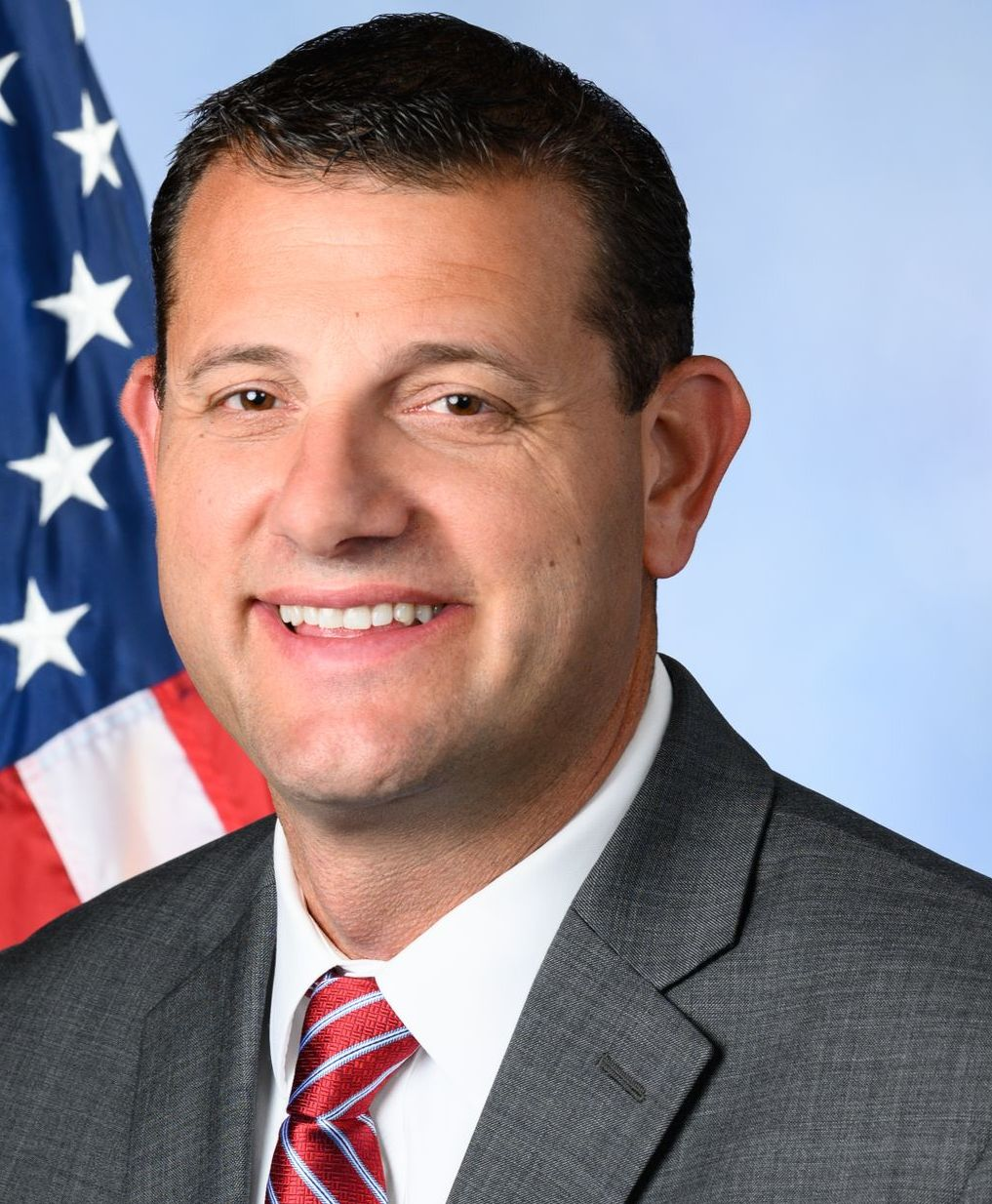

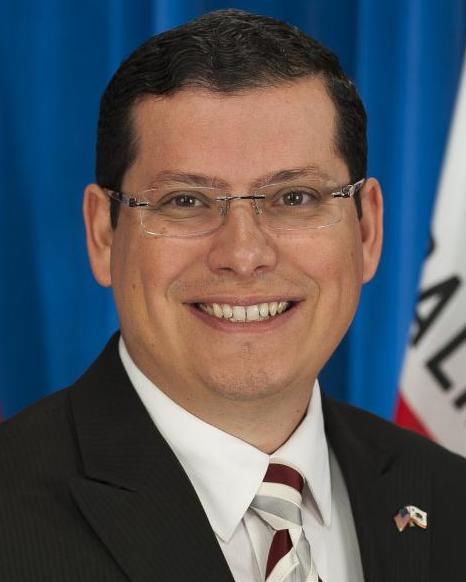
Candidate	David Valadao	Rudy Salas
Party	Republican	Democratic
Popular vote	52,994	49,862
Percentage	51.5%	48.5%
- Valadao: 50–60% 60–70% 70–80% 80–90% 90–100% Salas: 50–60% 60–70% 70–80% 80–90% 90–100% Tie: 50% No results
U.S. Representative before election
David Valadao
Republican
Elected U.S. Representative
David Valadao
Republican

Due to redistricting, the incumbent changed from Republican Connie Conway to fellow Republican David Valadao. Conway replaced Devin Nunes, who resigned in December 2021 to become CEO of Trump Media & Technology Group, in a 2022 special election. Conway declined to run for reelection. Valadao, who had represented the 21st district since 2021, was elected with 50.4% of the vote in 2020. Valadao was running for re-election. He was one of two House Republicans who voted to impeach Donald Trump during Trump's second impeachment who survived the primary election, along with Dan Newhouse of Washington.

=== Candidates ===
==== Advanced to general ====
- Rudy Salas (Democratic), state assemblyman
- David Valadao (Republican), incumbent U.S. representative

==== Eliminated in primary ====
- Chris Mathys (Republican), former Fresno city councilor
- Adam Medeiros (Republican), Kings County Board of Education trustee

==== Withdrew ====
- Angel Lara (Democratic), former aide to U.S. Senator Dianne Feinstein
- Bryan Osorio (Democratic), mayor of Delano (ran for state senate)
- Nicole Parra (Democratic), former state assemblywoman (ran for state senate)

==== Declined ====
- TJ Cox (Democratic), former U.S. representative (2019–2021) (endorsed Salas)

=== Endorsements ===
Bryan Osorio (D) (withdrew)

Individuals

- Marianne Williamson, author and candidate for president of the United States in 2020
Rudy Salas (D)

U.S. representatives

- TJ Cox, former CA-21 (2019–2021)

Individuals

- Dolores Huerta, labor leader, civil rights activist, and co-founder of the National Farmworkers Association

Organizations

- Blue Dog PAC
- BOLD PAC
- New Democrat Coalition Action Fund

Labor unions

- United Auto Workers
- United Farm Workers
David Valadao (R)

Politicians

- Kevin McCarthy, Minority Leader of the U.S. House of Representatives (2019–present) and U.S. representative for California's 23rd congressional district (2007–2023)
- Mike Pence, 48th vice president of the United States (2017–2021)
- Tim Scott, U.S. senator from South Carolina

Organizations

- Pro-Israel America
- Republican Jewish Coalition PAC

=== General election ===
==== Predictions ====
Source	Ranking	As of
The Cook Political Report	Tossup	December 21, 2021
Inside Elections	Tossup	December 28, 2021
Sabato's Crystal Ball	Lean R	November 7, 2022
Politico	Tossup	April 5, 2022
RCP	Tossup	June 9, 2022
Fox News	Tossup	July 11, 2022
DDHQ	Lean R	October 17, 2022
538	Lean R	November 8, 2022
The Economist	Tossup	September 7, 2022

==== Polling ====
Poll source	Date(s) administered	Sample size	Margin of error	David Valadao (R)	Rudy Salas (D)	Other	Undecided
RMG Research	July 30 – August 5, 2022	400 (LV)	± 4.9%	34%	39%	13%	14%
David Binder Research (D) (Note: Poll sponsored jointly by the Democratic Congressional Campaign Committee and Salas's campaign committee)	July 13–15, 2022	600 (LV)	± 4.0%	35%	43%	–	22%

=== Results ===
California's 22nd congressional district, 2022
Primary election
Party	Candidate	Votes	%
Democratic	Rudy Salas	25,337	45.2
Republican	David Valadao (incumbent)	14,331	25.6
Republican	Chris Mathys	13,111	23.4
Republican	Adam Medeiros	3,250	5.8
Total votes		56,029	100.0
General election
Republican	David Valadao (incumbent)	52,994	51.5
Democratic	Rudy Salas	49,862	48.5
Total votes		102,856	100.0
Republican hold			

==== By county ====
County	David Valadao Republican		Rudy Salas Democratic		Margin		Total votes cast
County	#	%	#	%	#	%	Total votes cast
Kern (part)	30,649	47.37%	34,053	52.63%	-3,404	-5.26%	64,702
Kings (part)	6,695	56.43%	5,170	43.57%	1,525	12.85%	11,865
Tulare (part)	15,650	59.53%	10,639	40.47%	5,011	19.06%	26,289
Totals	52,994	51.52%	49,862	48.48%	3,132	3.05%	102,856

== District 23 ==
2022 California's 23rd congressional district election
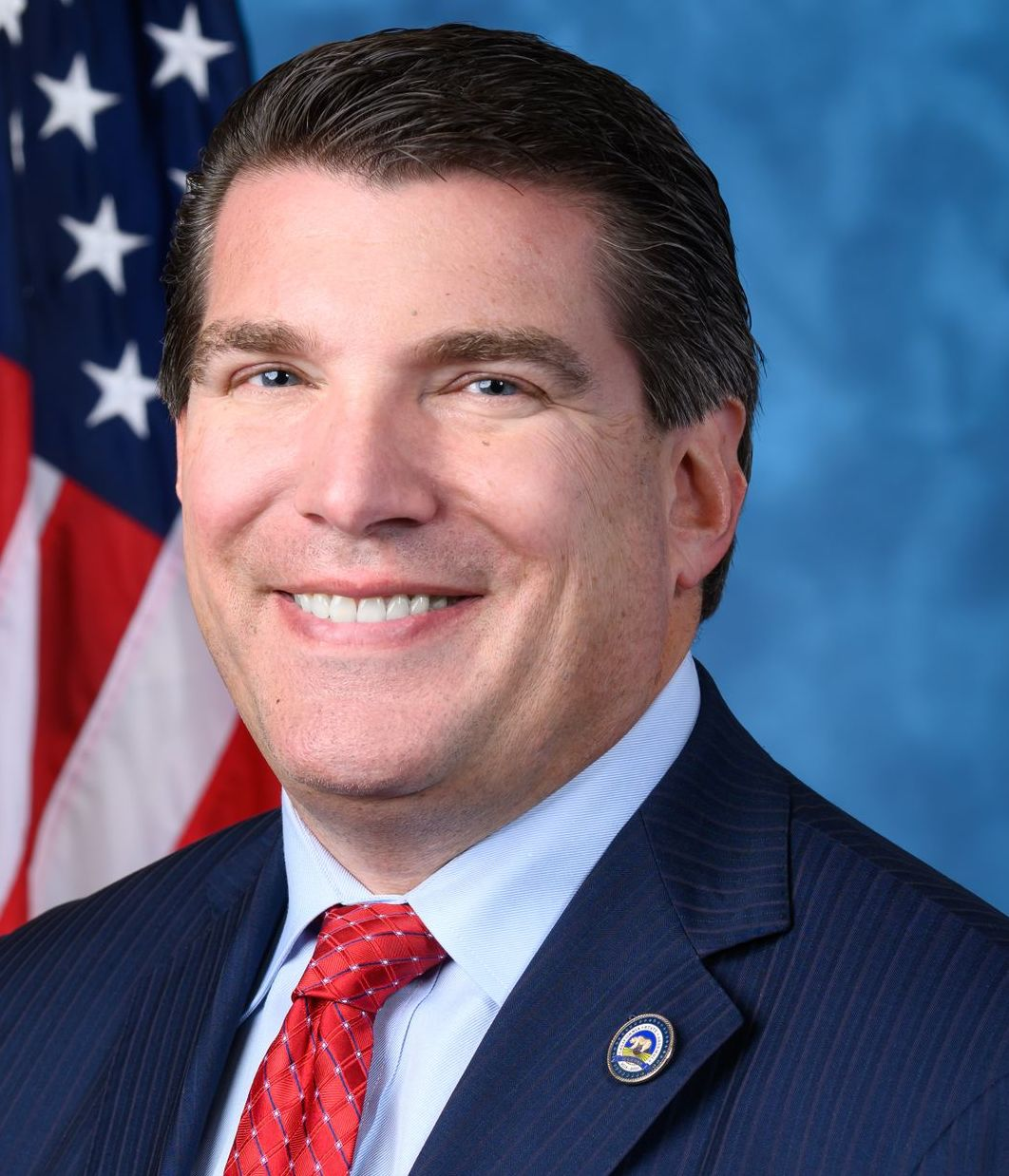

Candidate	Jay Obernolte	Derek Marshall
Party	Republican	Democratic
Popular vote	103,197	65,908
Percentage	61.0%	39.0%
- County results Obernolte: 50–60% 60–70%
U.S. Representative before election
Jay Obernolte
Republican
Elected U.S. Representative
Jay Obernolte
Republican

Due to redistricting, the incumbent changed from Republican Kevin McCarthy to fellow Republican Jay Obernolte. Obernolte, who had represented the 8th district since 2021, was elected with 56.1% of the vote in 2020.

=== Candidates ===
==== Advanced to general ====
- Derek Marshall (Democratic), community organizer
- Jay Obernolte (Republican), incumbent U.S. representative

==== Eliminated in primary ====
- Blanca Gomez (Democratic), Victorville city councilor

=== Endorsements ===
Derek Marshall (D)

Organizations

- Progressive Democrats of America

Individuals

- Marianne Williamson, author and candidate for president of the United States in 2020

Labor unions

- United Auto Workers
Jay Obernolte (R)

Federal officials

- Donald Trump, former president of the United States

Organizations

- Citizens for Responsible Energy Solutions

=== General election ===
==== Predictions ====
Source	Ranking	As of
The Cook Political Report	Solid R	December 21, 2021
Inside Elections	Solid R	December 28, 2021
Sabato's Crystal Ball	Safe R	January 4, 2022
Politico	Likely R	April 5, 2022
RCP	Safe R	June 9, 2022
Fox News	Solid R	August 22, 2022
DDHQ	Solid R	July 20, 2022
538	Solid R	June 30, 2022
The Economist	Safe R	September 7, 2022

=== Results ===
California's 23rd congressional district, 2022
Primary election
Party	Candidate	Votes	%
Republican	Jay Obernolte (incumbent)	57,988	60.9
Democratic	Derek Marshall	20,776	21.8
Democratic	Bianca A. Gómez	16,516	17.3
Total votes		95,280	100.0
General election
Republican	Jay Obernolte (incumbent)	103,197	61.0
Democratic	Derek Marshall	65,908	39.0
Total votes		169,105	100.0
Republican hold			

==== By county ====
County	Jay Obernolte Republican		Derek Marshall Democratic		Margin		Total votes cast
County	#	%	#	%	#	%	Total votes cast
Kern (part)	2,316	61.21%	1,468	38.79%	848	22.41%	3,784
Los Angeles (part)	1,521	53.84%	1,304	46.16%	217	7.68%	2,825
San Bernardino (part)	99,360	61.15%	63,136	38.85%	36,224	22.29%	162,496
Totals	103,197	61.03%	65,908	38.97%	37,289	22.05%	169,105

== District 24 ==
2022 California's 24th congressional district election
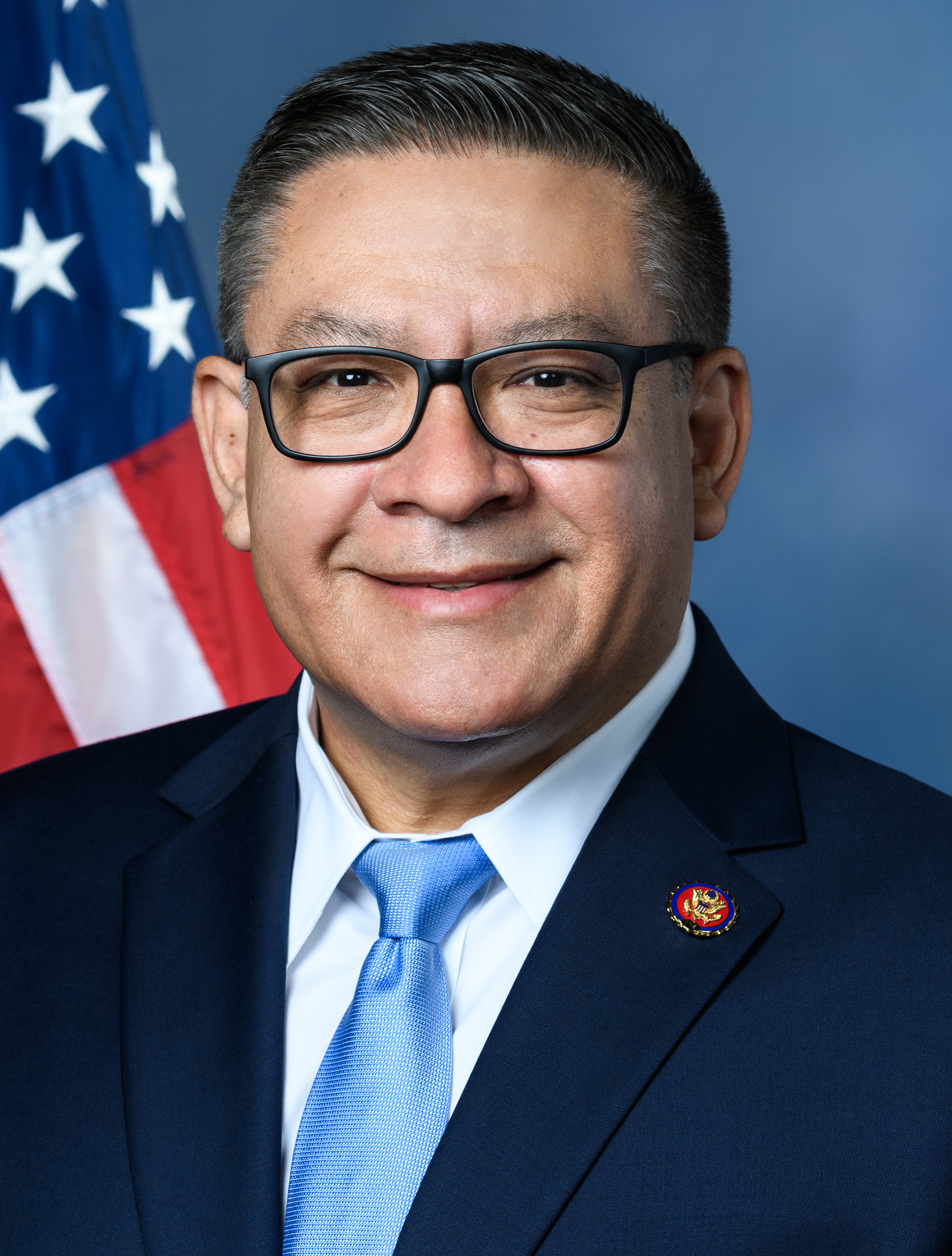

Candidate	Salud Carbajal	Brad Allen
Party	Democratic	Republican
Popular vote	159,019	103,533
Percentage	60.6%	39.4%
- County results Carbajal: 50–60% 60–70%
U.S. Representative before election
Salud Carbajal
Democratic
Elected U.S. Representative
Salud Carbajal
Democratic

Democrat Salud Carbajal, who had represented the district since 2017, was re-elected with 58.7% of the vote in 2020. Carbajal was running for re-election.

=== Candidates ===
==== Advanced to general ====
- Brad Allen (Republican)
- Salud Carbajal (Democratic), incumbent U.S. representative

==== Eliminated in primary ====
- Jeff Frankenfield (no party preference), global accounts manager
- Michele R. Weslander Quaid (no party preference), entrepreneur, coach, and educator

=== Endorsements ===
Salud Carbajal (D)

Organizations

- California Environmental Voters
- League of Conservation Voters Action Fund
- Planned Parenthood Action Fund
- Sierra Club

Labor unions

- SEIU California
- United Auto Workers
- United Farm Workers

=== General election ===
==== Predictions ====
Source	Ranking	As of
The Cook Political Report	Solid D	December 21, 2021
Inside Elections	Solid D	December 28, 2021
Sabato's Crystal Ball	Safe D	January 4, 2022
Politico	Solid D	April 5, 2022
RCP	Safe D	June 9, 2022
Fox News	Solid D	July 11, 2022
DDHQ	Solid D	July 20, 2022
538	Solid D	June 30, 2022
The Economist	Safe D	September 7, 2022

=== Results ===
California's 24th congressional district, 2022
Primary election
Party	Candidate	Votes	%
Democratic	Salud Carbajal (incumbent)	111,199	60.0
Republican	Brad Allen	57,532	31.0
No party preference	Michele R. Weslander Quaid	13,880	7.5
No party preference	Jeff Frankenfield	2,732	1.5
Total votes		185,343	100.0
General election
Democratic	Salud Carbajal (incumbent)	159,019	60.6
Republican	Brad Allen	103,533	39.4
Total votes		262,552	100.0
Democratic hold			

==== By county ====
County	Salud Carbajal Democratic		Brad Allen Republican		Margin		Total votes cast
County	#	%	#	%	#	%	Total votes cast
San Luis Obispo (part)	44,854	59.15%	30,971	40.85%	13,883	18.31%	75,825
Santa Barbara	81,656	61.04%	52,126	38.96%	29,530	22.07%	133,782
Ventura (part)	32,509	61.40%	20,436	38.60%	12,073	22.80%	52,945
Totals	159,019	60.57%	103,533	39.43%	55,486	21.13%	262,552

== District 25 ==
2022 California's 25th congressional district election
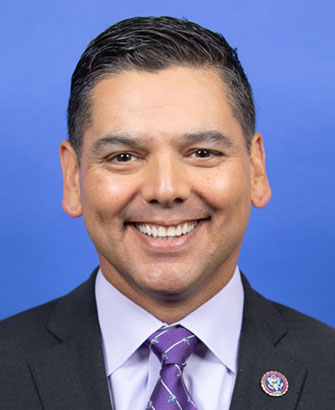

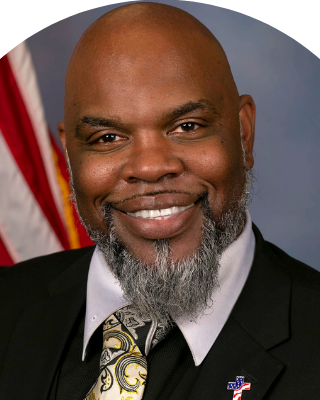
Candidate	Raul Ruiz	Brian Hawkins
Party	Democratic	Republican
Popular vote	87,641	65,101
Percentage	57.4%	42.6%
- County results Ruiz: 50–60% 60–70% Hawkins: 60–70%
U.S. Representative before election
Raul Ruiz
Democratic
Elected U.S. Representative
Raul Ruiz
Democratic

Due to redistricting, the incumbent changed from Republican Mike Garcia to Democrat Raul Ruiz. Ruiz, who had represented the 36th district since 2013, was re-elected with 60.3% of the vote in 2020.

=== Candidates ===
==== Advanced to general ====
- Brian Hawkins (Republican), San Jacinto city councilor and pastor
- Raul Ruiz (Democratic), incumbent U.S. representative

==== Eliminated in primary ====
- James Gibson (Republican), bank vice president
- Jonathan Reiss (Republican), multimedia consultant
- Burt Thakur (Republican), engineering project manager
- Ceci Truman (Republican), small business owner
- Brian Tyson (Republican), physician and business owner

==== Declined ====
- Eduardo Garcia (Democratic), state assemblyman (running for re-election)

=== Endorsements ===
Raul Ruiz (D)

Organizations

- California Environmental Voters
- Feminist Majority PAC
- League of Conservation Voters
- Planned Parenthood Action Fund
- Sierra Club

Labor unions

- SEIU California

=== General election ===
==== Predictions ====
Source	Ranking	As of
The Cook Political Report	Solid D	December 21, 2021
Inside Elections	Solid D	December 28, 2021
Sabato's Crystal Ball	Likely D	January 4, 2022
Politico	Likely D	April 5, 2022
RCP	Lean D	October 30, 2022
Fox News	Likely D	August 22, 2022
DDHQ	Solid D	August 2, 2022
538	Solid D	November 8, 2022
The Economist	Likely D	October 4, 2022

=== Results ===
California's 25th congressional district, 2022
Primary election
Party	Candidate	Votes	%
Democratic	Raul Ruiz (incumbent)	55,315	56.4
Republican	Brian Hawkins	16,085	16.4
Republican	Brian Tyson	14,186	14.5
Republican	James Francis Gibson	6,059	6.2
Republican	Burt Thakur	2,982	3.0
Republican	Ceci Truman	1,850	1.9
Republican	Jonathan Reiss	1,609	1.6
Total votes		98,086	100.0
General election
Democratic	Raul Ruiz (incumbent)	87,641	57.4
Republican	Brian Hawkins	65,101	42.6
Total votes		152,742	100.0
Democratic hold			

==== By county ====
County	Raul Ruiz Democratic		Brian Hawkins Republican		Margin		Total votes cast
County	#	%	#	%	#	%	Total votes cast
Imperial	18,193	61.07%	11,598	38.93%	6,595	22.14%	29,791
Riverside (part)	68,930	56.70%	52,640	43.30%	16,290	13.40%	121,570
San Bernardino (part)	518	37.51%	863	62.49%	−345	−24.98%	1,381
Totals	87,641	57.38%	65,101	42.62%	22,540	14.76%	152,742

== District 26 ==
2022 California's 26th congressional district election
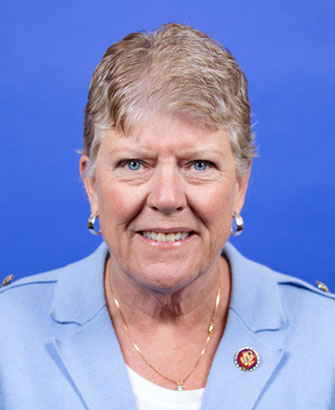

Candidate	Julia Brownley	Matt Jacobs
Party	Democratic	Republican
Popular vote	134,575	112,214
Percentage	54.5%	45.5%
- County results Brownley: 50–60%
U.S. Representative before election
Julia Brownley
Democratic
Elected U.S. Representative
Julia Brownley
Democratic

Democrat Julia Brownley, who had represented the district since 2013, was re-elected with 60.6% of the vote in 2020.

The boundaries of the district were redrawn during the 2020 redistricting cycle and became effective on March 27, 2022, for the 2022 primary and general elections.

=== Candidates ===
==== Advanced to general ====
- Julia Brownley (Democratic), incumbent U.S. representative
- Matt Jacobs (Republican), attorney

==== Eliminated in primary ====
- David Goodman (no party preference), businessman
- Fadde Mikhail (Republican), professional sports agent
- Paul Taylor (Republican), businessman

==== Withdrew ====
- Daniel Wilson (no party preference), veteran (ran for state assembly)

=== Endorsements ===
Julia Brownley (D)

Organizations

- California Environmental Voters
- Feminist Majority PAC
- League of Conservation Voters
- Planned Parenthood Action Fund
- Sierra Club

Labor unions

- National Women's Political Caucus
- SEIU California
- United Auto Workers
Matt Jacobs (R)

Executive Branch officials

- John Bolton, United States National Security Advisor (2018–2019), United States Ambassador to the United Nations (2005–2006)

=== General election ===
==== Predictions ====
Source	Ranking	As of
The Cook Political Report	Lean D	November 1, 2022
Inside Elections	Likely D	November 3, 2022
Sabato's Crystal Ball	Likely D	April 19, 2022
Politico	Lean D	November 3, 2022
RCP	Lean D	June 9, 2022
Fox News	Likely D	August 22, 2022
DDHQ	Likely D	October 16, 2022
538	Solid D	September 29, 2022
The Economist	Likely D	September 7, 2022

=== Results ===
California's 26th congressional district, 2022
Primary election
Party	Candidate	Votes	%
Democratic	Julia Brownley (incumbent)	91,535	54.3
Republican	Matt Jacobs	64,835	38.4
Republican	Paul Nathan Taylor	5,612	3.3
No party preference	Dave Goodman	3,950	2.3
Republican	Fadde Mikhail	2,775	1.6
Total votes		168,707	100.0
General election
Democratic	Julia Brownley (incumbent)	134,575	54.5
Republican	Matt Jacobs	112,214	45.5
Total votes		246,789	100.0
Democratic hold			

==== By county ====
County	Julia Brownley Democratic		Matt Jacobs Republican		Margin		Total votes cast
County	#	%	#	%	#	%	Total votes cast
Los Angeles (part)	13,140	58.87%	9,179	41.13%	3,961	17.75%	22,319
Ventura (part)	121,435	54.10%	103,035	45.90%	18,400	8.20%	224,470
Totals	134,575	54.53%	112,214	45.47%	22,361	9.06%	246,789

== District 27 ==
2022 California's 27th congressional district election
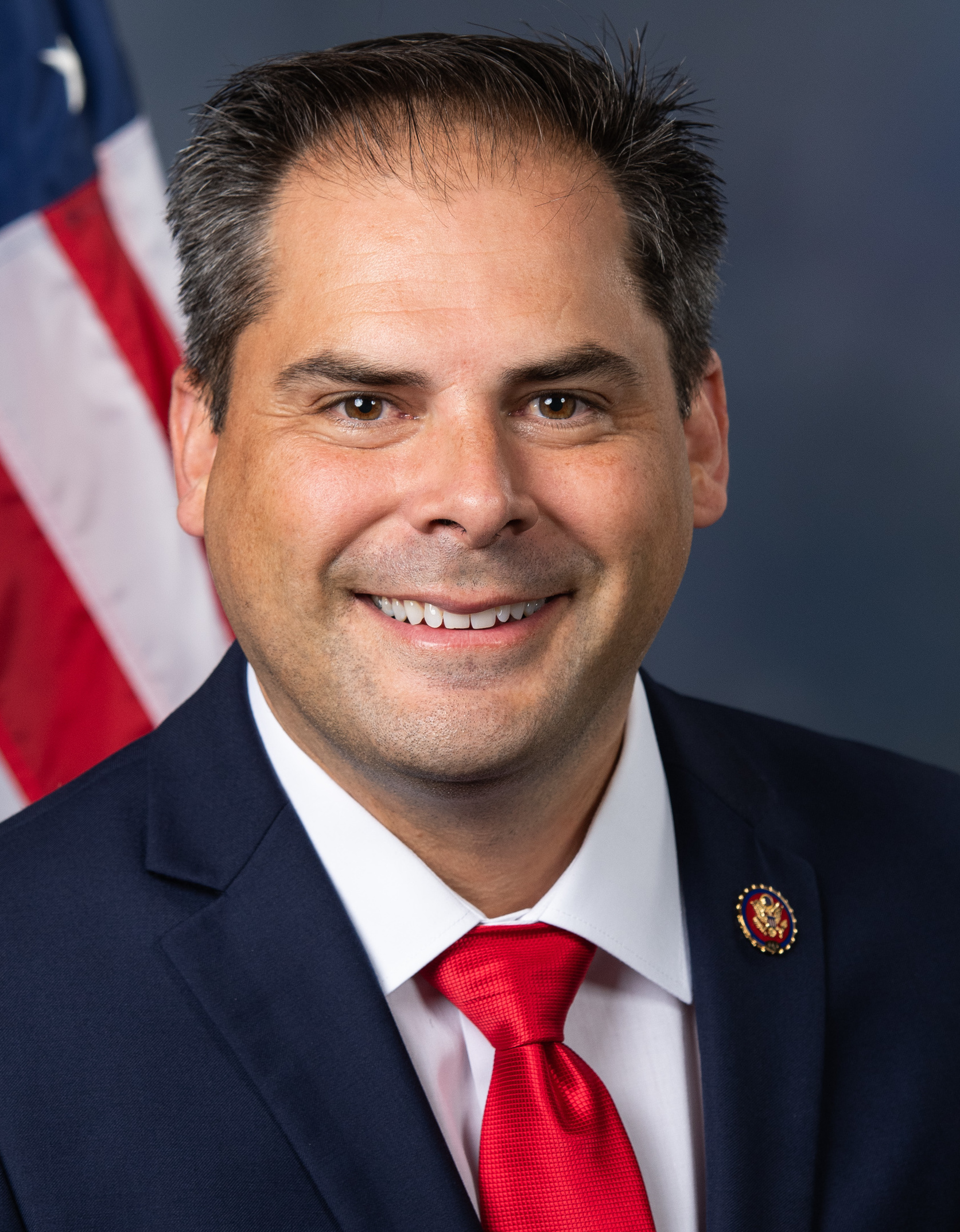

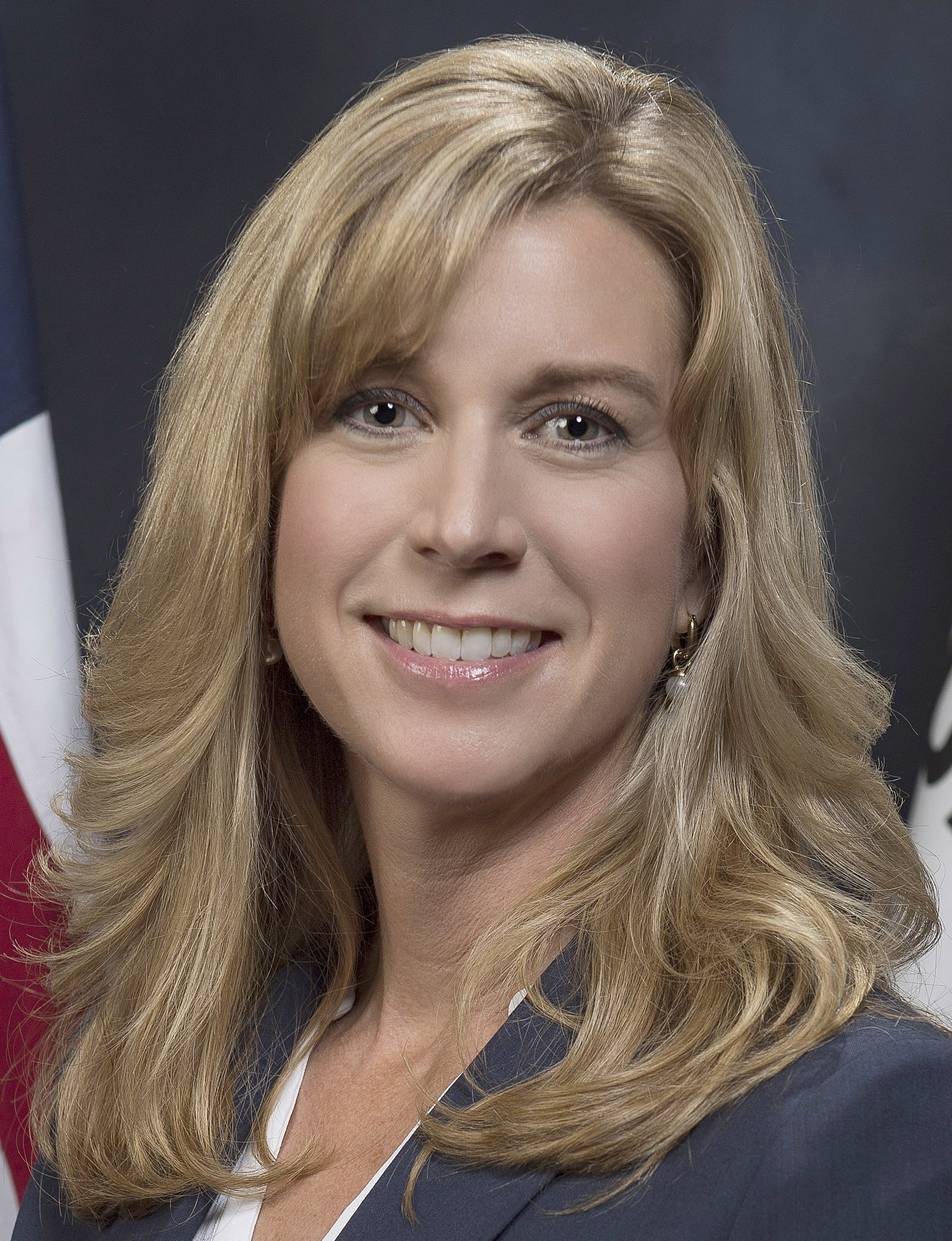
Candidate	Mike Garcia	Christy Smith
Party	Republican	Democratic
Popular vote	104,624	91,892
Percentage	53.2%	46.8%
- Block group results Garcia: 50–60% 60–70% 70–80% 80–90% 90–100% Smith: 50–60% 60–70% No results
U.S. Representative before election
Mike Garcia
Republican
Elected U.S. Representative
Mike Garcia
Republican

Due to redistricting, the incumbent changed from Democrat Judy Chu to Republican Mike Garcia. Garcia, who had represented the 25th district since 2020, was re-elected with 50.05% of the vote in 2020.

=== Candidates ===
==== Advanced to general ====
- Mike Garcia (Republican), incumbent U.S. representative
- Christy Smith (Democratic), former state assemblywoman and runner-up for this district in 2020

==== Eliminated in primary ====
- Ruth Luevanos (Democratic), Simi Valley city councilor
- Mark Pierce (Republican), small business owner
- Quaye Quartey (Democratic), retired U.S. Navy officer
- David Rudnick (Republican), business owner, former U.S. Marine Corps Infantryman

==== Declined ====
- Chris Bellingham (Democratic), former combat medic and researcher
- Steve Hill (Democratic), appraiser, comedian, and U.S. Marine Corps veteran
- Rhoda Nazanin (Democratic), project manager
- Dara Stransky (Democratic), business owner

=== Endorsements ===
Mike Garcia (R)

Organizations

- Republican Jewish Coalition
- Tea Party Express (post-primary)

Newspapers

- Los Angeles Daily News
- Santa Clarita Valley Signal
Ruth Luevanos (D)

Organizations

- Progressive Democrats of America

Individuals

- Marianne Williamson, author and candidate for president of the United States in 2020
Quaye Quartey (D)

Organizations

- 314 Action
- New Democrat Coalition Action Fund
- New Politics
- VoteVets.org
Christy Smith (D)

Newspapers

- Los Angeles Times

Organizations

- California Environmental Voters
- Equality California
- League of Conservation Voters Action Fund (post-primary)
- Sierra Club
- Stonewall Democrats

Labor unions

- National Women's Political Caucus
- SEIU California
- United Auto Workers

=== Primary election ===
==== Polling ====
Poll source	Date(s) administered	Sample size	Margin of error	Mike Garcia (R)	Quaye Quartey (D)	Christy Smith (D)	Undecided
Remington Research Group (R)	April 19–20, 2022	801 (LV)	± 3.3%	44%	10%	34%	12%

=== General election ===
==== Predictions ====
Source	Ranking	As of
The Cook Political Report	Tossup	December 21, 2021
Inside Elections	Tilt R	October 7, 2022
Sabato's Crystal Ball	Lean R	October 26, 2022
Politico	Lean R	October 26, 2022
RCP	Lean R	October 16, 2022
Fox News	Lean R	November 1, 2022
DDHQ	Tossup	October 14, 2022
538	Lean R	October 26, 2022
The Economist	Lean D (flip)	October 16, 2022

==== Polling ====
Poll source	Date(s) administered	Sample size	Margin of error	Mike Garcia (R)	Christy Smith (D)	Undecided
The Mellman Group (D) (Note: Poll sponsored by Smith's campaign)	October 3–6, 2022	400 (LV)	± 4.9%	41%	47%	12%
The Mellman Group (D)	August 25–30, 2022	600 (LV)	± 4.0%	42%	44%	14%
Remington Research Group (R)	April 19–20, 2022	801 (LV)	± 3.3%	47%	45%	8%

Hypothetical polling

Mike Garcia vs. Quaye Quartey

Poll source	Date(s) administered	Sample size	Margin of error	Mike Garcia (R)	Quaye Quartey (D)	Undecided
Remington Research Group (R)	April 19–20, 2022	801 (LV)	± 3.3%	47%	41%	12%

=== Results ===
California's 27th congressional district, 2022
Primary election
Party	Candidate	Votes	%
Republican	Mike Garcia (incumbent)	57,469	47.1
Democratic	Christy Smith	45,675	37.4
Democratic	Quaye Quartey	8,303	6.8
Democratic	Ruth Luevanos	6,668	5.5
Republican	David Rudnick	2,648	2.2
Republican	Mark Pierce	1,352	1.1
Total votes		122,115	100.0
General election
Republican	Mike Garcia (incumbent)	104,624	53.2
Democratic	Christy Smith	91,892	46.8
Total votes		196,516	100.0
Republican hold			

==== By county ====
County	Mike Garcia Republican		Christy Smith Democratic		Margin		Total votes cast
County	#	%	#	%	#	%	Total votes cast
Los Angeles (part)	104,624	53.24%	91,892	46.76%	12,732	6.48%	196,516
Totals	104,624	53.24%	91,892	46.76%	12,732	6.48%	196,516

== District 28 ==
2022 California's 28th congressional district election
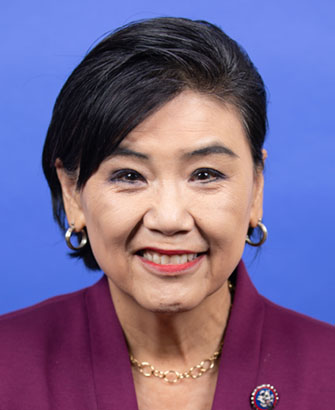

Candidate	Judy Chu	Wes Hallman
Party	Democratic	Republican
Popular vote	150,062	76,495
Percentage	66.2%	33.8%
- Chu: 50–60% 60–70% 70–80% 80–90% 90–100% Hallman: 50–60% 60–70% 70–80% 80–90% 90–100% No results
U.S. Representative before election
Judy Chu
Democratic
Elected U.S. Representative
Judy Chu
Democratic

Due to redistricting, the incumbent changed from Democrat Adam Schiff to fellow Democrat Judy Chu. Chu, who had represented the 27th district since 2013, was re-elected with 69.8% of the vote in 2020.

=== Candidates ===
==== Advanced to general ====
- Judy Chu (Democratic), incumbent U.S. representative
- Wes Hallman (Republican)

==== Eliminated in primary ====
- Dorothy Caronna (Democratic)
- Gio DePaolis (no party preference), media consultant

==== Withdrew ====
- Fepbrina Estrelvia Keivaulqe Autiameineire (no party preference), community organizer
- Ali Jordan (no party preference)
- Daniel Bocic Martinez (Republican), attorney and talent scout
- Johnny Nalbandian (Republican)
- Crystal Prebola (Republican), podcast host

=== Endorsements ===
Judy Chu (D)

Organizations

- California Environmental Voters
- Feminist Majority PAC
- NARAL Pro-Choice America
- Planned Parenthood Action Fund
- Progressive Democrats of America
- Sierra Club

Labor unions

- National Women's Political Caucus
- SEIU California
- United Auto Workers

=== General election ===
==== Predictions ====
Source	Ranking	As of
The Cook Political Report	Solid D	December 21, 2021
Inside Elections	Solid D	December 28, 2021
Sabato's Crystal Ball	Safe D	January 4, 2022
Politico	Solid D	April 5, 2022
RCP	Safe D	June 9, 2022
Fox News	Solid D	July 11, 2022
DDHQ	Solid D	July 20, 2022
538	Solid D	June 30, 2022
The Economist	Safe D	September 7, 2022

=== Results ===
California's 28th congressional district, 2022
Primary election
Party	Candidate	Votes	%
Democratic	Judy Chu (incumbent)	90,395	63.0
Republican	Wes Hallman	41,955	29.2
Democratic	Dorothy Caronna	7,993	5.6
No party preference	Giuliano Depaolis	3,100	2.2
Total votes		143,443	100.0
General election
Democratic	Judy Chu (incumbent)	150,062	66.2
Republican	Wes Hallman	76,495	33.8
Total votes		226,557	100.0
Democratic hold			

==== By county ====
County	Judy Chu Democratic		Wes Hallman Republican		Margin		Total votes cast
County	#	%	#	%	#	%	Total votes cast
Los Angeles (part)	138,106	70.16%	58,734	29.84%	79,372	40.32%	196,840
San Bernardino (part)	11,956	40.23%	17,761	59.77%	−5,805	−19.53%	29,717
Totals	150,062	66.24%	76,495	33.76%	73,567	32.47%	226,557

== District 29 ==
2022 California's 29th congressional district election
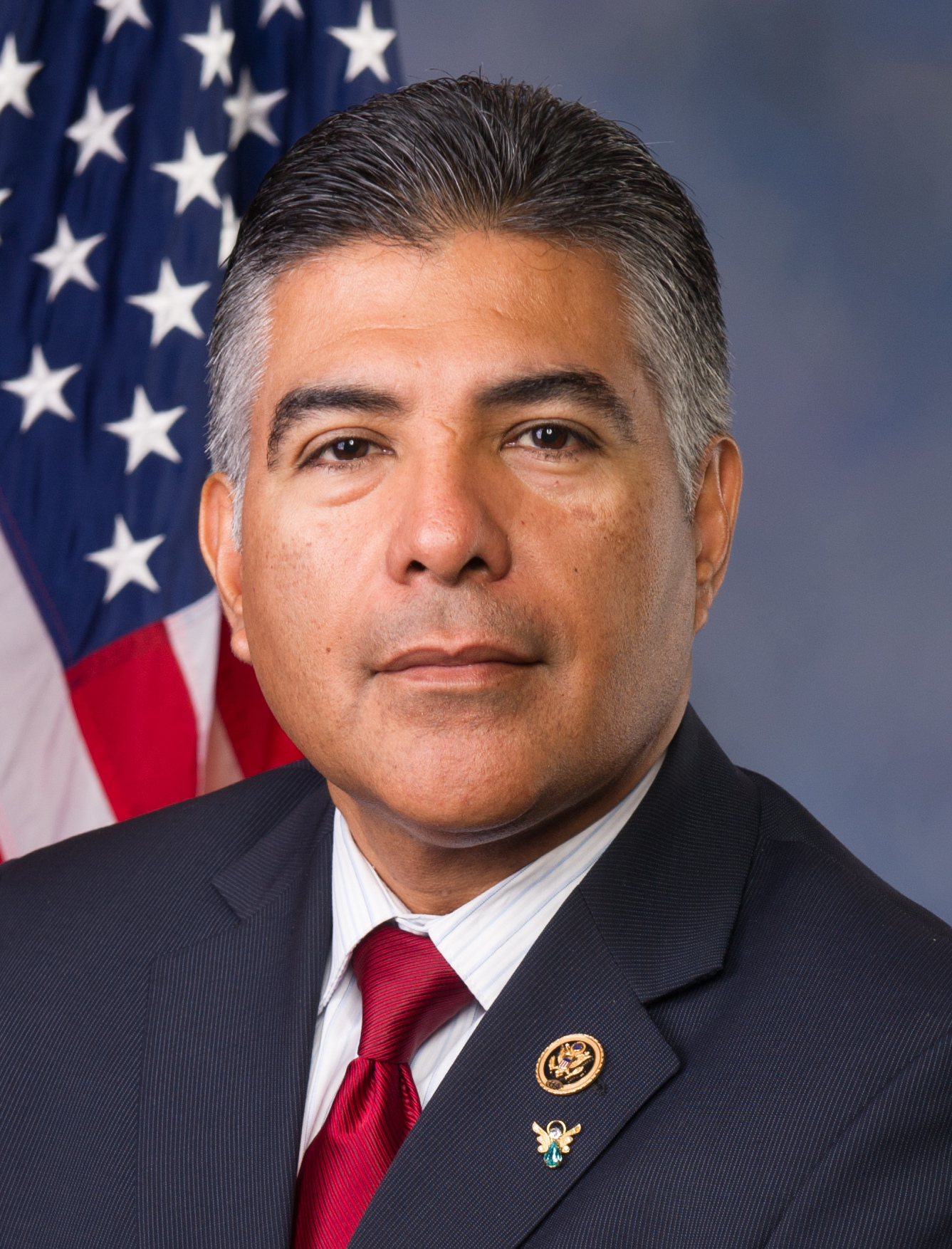

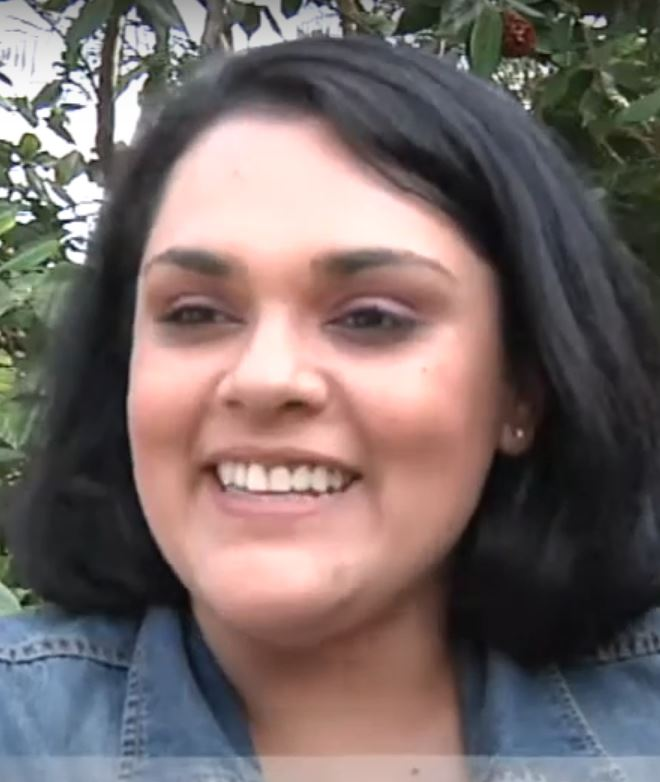
Candidate	Tony Cárdenas	Angelica Dueñas
Party	Democratic	Democratic
Popular vote	69,915	49,520
Percentage	58.5%	41.5%
- Block group results Cárdenas: 50–60% 60–70% 70–80% Dueñas: 50–60%
U.S. Representative before election
Tony Cárdenas
Democratic
Elected U.S. Representative
Tony Cárdenas
Democratic

Democrat Tony Cárdenas, who had represented the district since 2013, was re-elected with 56.6% of the vote in 2020.

=== Candidates ===
==== Advanced to general ====
- Tony Cárdenas (Democratic), incumbent U.S. representative
- Angelica Dueñas (Democratic), former president of the Sun Valley neighborhood council, candidate for this district in 2018, and runner-up in 2020 (Note: Dueñas ran as a Green in 2018, but as a Democrat in 2020.)

==== Eliminated in primary ====
- Margarita Maria Carranza (Republican)
- Rudy Melendez (Republican)
- Andy Miranda (Republican)

=== Endorsements ===
Tony Cárdenas (D)

Organizations

- California Environmental Voters
- Planned Parenthood Action Fund
- Sierra Club

Labor unions

- SEIU California
- United Auto Workers
Angelica Dueñas (D)

Individuals

- Marianne Williamson, author and candidate for president of the United States in 2020

Organizations

- Brand New Congress
- Progressive Democrats of America

=== General election ===
==== Predictions ====
Source	Ranking	As of
The Cook Political Report	Solid D	December 21, 2021
Inside Elections	Solid D	December 28, 2021
Sabato's Crystal Ball	Safe D	January 4, 2022
Politico	Solid D	April 5, 2022
RCP	Safe D	June 9, 2022
Fox News	Solid D	July 11, 2022
DDHQ	Solid D	July 20, 2022
538	Solid D	June 30, 2022
The Economist	Safe D	September 7, 2022

=== Results ===
California's 29th congressional district, 2022
Primary election
Party	Candidate	Votes	%
Democratic	Tony Cárdenas (incumbent)	47,941	56.7
Democratic	Angélica Dueñas	19,321	22.8
Republican	Margarita Maria Carranza	7,079	8.4
Republican	Andy Miranda	5,167	6.1
Republican	Rudy Melendez	5,057	6.0
Total votes		84,565	100.0
General election
Democratic	Tony Cárdenas (incumbent)	69,915	58.5
Democratic	Angélica Dueñas	49,520	41.5
Total votes		119,435	100.0
Democratic hold			

==== By county ====
County	Tony Cárdenas Democratic		Angélica Dueñas Democratic		Margin		Total votes cast
County	#	%	#	%	#	%	Total votes cast
Los Angeles (part)	69,915	58.54%	49,520	41.46%	20,395	17.08%	119,435
Totals	69,915	58.54%	49,520	41.46%	20,395	17.08%	119,435

== District 30 ==
2022 California's 30th congressional district election
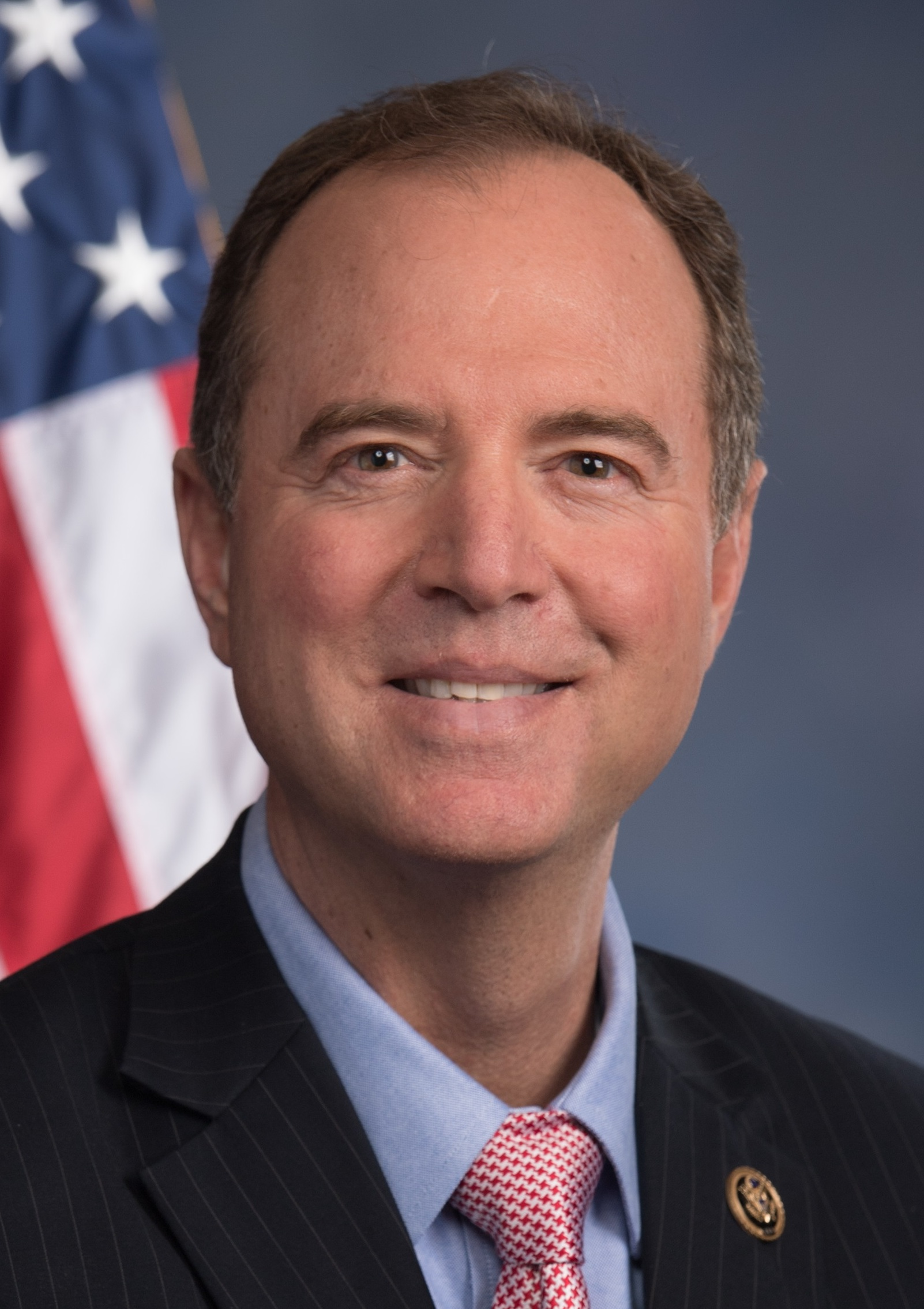

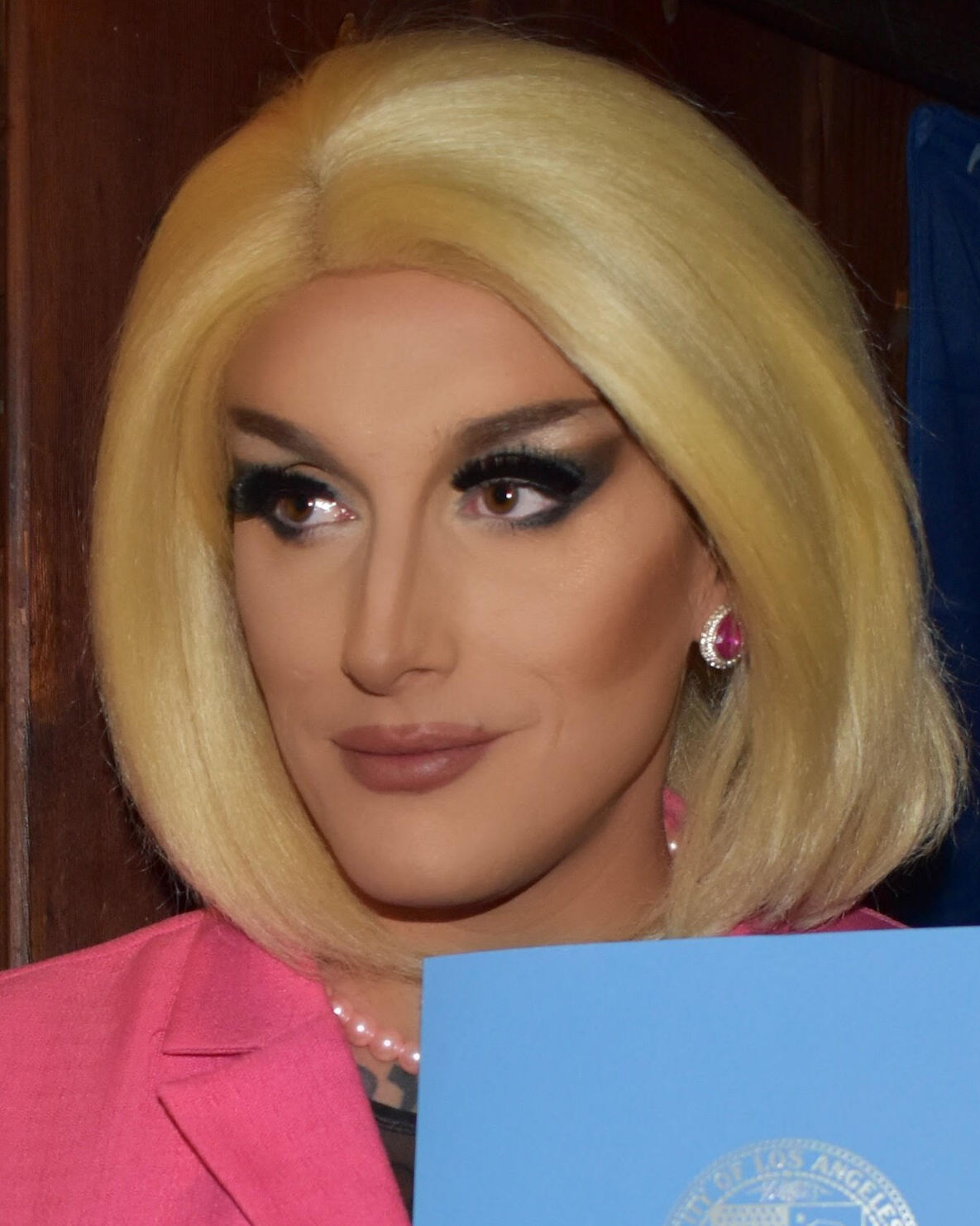
Candidate	Adam Schiff	Maebe A. Girl
Party	Democratic	Democratic
Popular vote	150,100	60,968
Percentage	71.1%	28.9%
- Block group results Schiff: 50–60% 60–70% 70–80% 80–90% 90–100% No results
U.S. Representative before election
Adam Schiff
Democratic
Elected U.S. Representative
Adam Schiff
Democratic

Due to redistricting, the incumbent changed from Democrat Brad Sherman to fellow Democrat Adam Schiff. Schiff, who had represented the 28th district since 2013, was re-elected with 72.7% of the vote in 2020. Schiff was running for re-election.

=== Candidates ===
==== Advanced to general ====
- Maebe A. Girl (Democratic), Silver Lake neighborhood council board member, drag queen, and candidate for this district in 2020
- Adam Schiff (Democratic), incumbent U.S. representative

==== Eliminated in primary ====
- Sal Genovese (Republican), community services director
- Patrick Gipson (Republican), former Los Angeles County deputy sheriff
- Ronda Kennedy (Republican), attorney and runner-up for California's 26th congressional district in 2020
- William "Gunner" Meurer (Green), business owner
- Johnny Nalbandian (Republican), food industry businessman
- Tony Rodriguez, construction recruiter
- Paloma Zuniga (Republican), actress

=== Endorsements ===
Maebe A. Girl (D)

Individuals

- Ron Placone, former host for The Young Turks
- Marianne Williamson, author and candidate for president of the United States in 2020

Newspapers

- LA Progressive
Adam Schiff (D)

Organizations

- California Environmental Voters
- Planned Parenthood Action Fund
- Sierra Club

Labor unions

- SEIU California
- United Auto Workers

=== General election ===
==== Predictions ====
Source	Ranking	As of
The Cook Political Report	Solid D	December 21, 2021
Inside Elections	Solid D	December 28, 2021
Sabato's Crystal Ball	Safe D	January 4, 2022
Politico	Solid D	April 5, 2022
RCP	Safe D	June 9, 2022
Fox News	Solid D	July 11, 2022
DDHQ	Solid D	July 20, 2022
538	Solid D	June 30, 2022
The Economist	Safe D	September 7, 2022

=== Results ===
California's 30th congressional district, 2022
Primary election
Party	Candidate	Votes	%
Democratic	Adam Schiff (incumbent)	102,290	62.4
Democratic	G "Maebe A. Girl" Pudlo	21,053	12.9
Republican	Ronda Kennedy	13,953	8.5
Republican	Patrick Lee Gipson	10,529	6.4
Republican	Johnny J. Nalbandian	7,693	4.7
Republican	Paloma Zuniga	2,614	1.6
Democratic	Sal Genovese	2,612	1.6
Green	William "Gunner" Meurer	1,598	1.0
American Independent	Tony Rodriguez	1,460	0.9
Total votes		163,802	100.0
General election
Democratic	Adam Schiff (incumbent)	150,100	71.1
Democratic	G "Maebe A. Girl" Pudlo	60,968	28.9
Total votes		211,068	100.0
Democratic hold			

==== By county ====
County	Adam Schiff Democratic		Maebe A. Girl Democratic		Margin		Total votes cast
County	#	%	#	%	#	%	Total votes cast
Los Angeles (part)	150,100	71.11%	60,968	28.89%	89,132	42.23%	211,068
Totals	150,100	71.11%	60,968	28.89%	89,132	42.23%	211,068

== District 31 ==
2022 California's 31st congressional district election
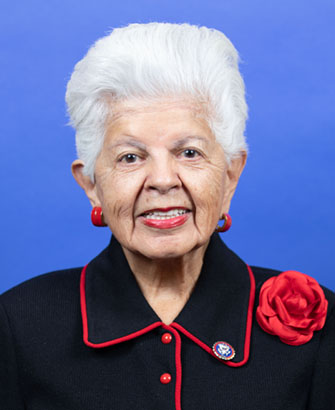

Candidate	Grace Napolitano	Daniel Martinez
Party	Democratic	Republican
Popular vote	91,472	62,153
Percentage	59.5%	40.5%
- Block group results Napolitano: 50–60% 60–70% 70–80% 80–90% 90–100% Martinez: 50–60% 60–70% 70–80% No results
U.S. Representative before election
Grace Napolitano
Democratic
Elected U.S. Representative
Grace Napolitano
Democratic

Due to redistricting, the incumbent changed from Democrat Pete Aguilar to fellow Democrat Grace Napolitano. Napolitano, who had represented the 32nd district since 2013, was re-elected with 66.6% of the vote in 2020.

=== Candidates ===
==== Advanced to general ====
- Daniel Bocic Martinez (Republican), attorney and high school teacher
- Grace Napolitano (Democratic), incumbent U.S. representative

==== Eliminated in primary ====
- Rocco De Luca (Democratic), construction project manager
- Erskine Levi (no party preference) (write-in)

=== Endorsements ===
Erskine Levi (I)

Political parties

- American Solidarity Party
Grace Napolitano (D)

Organizations

- California Environmental Voters
- Feminist Majority PAC
- League of Conservation Voters
- Planned Parenthood Action Fund
- Sierra Club

Labor unions

- United Auto Workers

=== General election ===
==== Predictions ====
Source	Ranking	As of
The Cook Political Report	Solid D	December 21, 2021
Inside Elections	Solid D	December 28, 2021
Sabato's Crystal Ball	Safe D	January 4, 2022
Politico	Solid D	April 5, 2022
RCP	Safe D	June 9, 2022
Fox News	Solid D	July 11, 2022
DDHQ	Solid D	July 20, 2022
538	Solid D	June 30, 2022
The Economist	Safe D	September 7, 2022

=== Results ===
California's 31st congressional district, 2022
Primary election
Party	Candidate	Votes	%
Democratic	Grace Napolitano (incumbent)	49,415	55.5
Republican	Daniel Bocic Martinez	32,721	36.7
Democratic	Rocco Anthony De Luca	6,948	7.8
No party preference	Erskine Levi (write-in)	17	0.0
Total votes		89,101	100.0
General election
Democratic	Grace Napolitano (incumbent)	91,472	59.5
Republican	Daniel Bocic Martinez	62,153	40.5
Total votes		153,625	100.0
Democratic hold			

==== By county ====
County	Grace Napolitano Democratic		Daniel Martinez Republican		Margin		Total votes cast
County	#	%	#	%	#	%	Total votes cast
Los Angeles (part)	91,472	59.54%	62,153	40.46%	29,319	19.08%	153,625
Totals	91,472	59.54%	62,153	40.46%	29,319	19.08%	153,625

== District 32 ==
2022 California's 32nd congressional district election
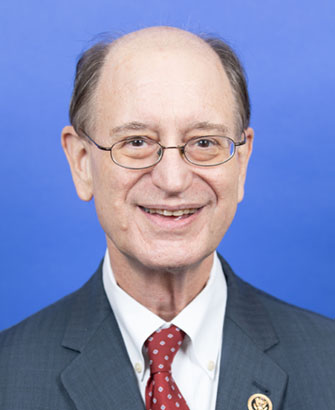

Candidate	Brad Sherman	Lucie Volotzky
Party	Democratic	Republican
Popular vote	167,411	74,618
Percentage	69.2%	30.8%
- Sherman: 50–60% 60–70% 70–80% 80–90% No results
U.S. Representative before election
Brad Sherman
Democratic
Elected U.S. Representative
Brad Sherman
Democratic

Due to redistricting, the incumbent changed from Democrat Grace Napolitano to fellow Democrat Brad Sherman. Sherman, who had represented the 30th district since 2013, was re-elected with 69.5% of the vote in 2020.

=== Candidates ===
==== Advanced to general ====
- Brad Sherman (Democratic), incumbent U.S. representative
- Lucie Volotzky (Republican), realtor

==== Eliminated in primary ====
- Shervin Aazami (Democratic), public health professional
- Melissa Toomim (Republican)
- Jason Potell (Democratic), business consultant and dance instructor
- Raji Rab (Democratic), pilot and perennial candidate
- Aarika Rhodes (Democratic), elementary school teacher

=== Endorsements ===
Shervin Aazami (D)

State legislators

- Nina Turner, president of Our Revolution and former member of the Ohio Senate (2008–2014)

Individuals

- Marianne Williamson, author and candidate for president of the United States in 2020

Organizations

- Brand New Congress
- Center for Biological Diversity Action Fund
- Friends of the Earth Action Fund
- Iranian American PAC
- Jewish Voice for Peace Action Fund
- National Iranian American Council Action
- Progressive Democrats of America
- Roots Action
- San Fernando Valley Young Democrats
Brad Sherman (D)

Organizations

- California Environmental Voters
- Planned Parenthood Action Fund
- Pro-Israel America
- Sierra Club

Labor unions

- SEIU California
- United Auto Workers

=== General election ===
==== Predictions ====
Source	Ranking	As of
The Cook Political Report	Solid D	December 21, 2021
Inside Elections	Solid D	December 28, 2021
Sabato's Crystal Ball	Safe D	January 4, 2022
Politico	Solid D	April 5, 2022
RCP	Safe D	June 9, 2022
Fox News	Solid D	July 11, 2022
DDHQ	Solid D	July 20, 2022
538	Solid D	June 30, 2022
The Economist	Safe D	September 7, 2022

=== Results ===
California's 32nd congressional district, 2022
Primary election
Party	Candidate	Votes	%
Democratic	Brad Sherman (incumbent)	88,063	53.7
Republican	Lucie Lapointe Volotzky	32,342	19.7
Democratic	Shervin Aazami	15,036	9.2
Republican	Melissa Toomim	13,926	8.5
Democratic	Aarika Samone Rhodes	8,744	5.3
Democratic	Jason Potell	2,943	1.8
Democratic	Raji Rab	2,938	1.8
Total votes		163,992	100.0
General election
Democratic	Brad Sherman (incumbent)	167,411	69.2
Republican	Lucie Lapointe Volotzky	74,618	30.8
Total votes		242,029	100.0
Democratic hold			

==== By county ====
County	Brad Sherman Democratic		Lucie Volotzky Republican		Margin		Total votes cast
County	#	%	#	%	#	%	Total votes cast
Los Angeles (part)	166,956	69.23%	74,211	30.77%	92,745	38.46%	241,167
Ventura (part)	455	52.78%	407	47.22%	48	5.57%	862
Totals	167,411	69.17%	74,618	30.83%	92,793	38.34%	242,029

== District 33 ==
2022 California's 33rd congressional district election
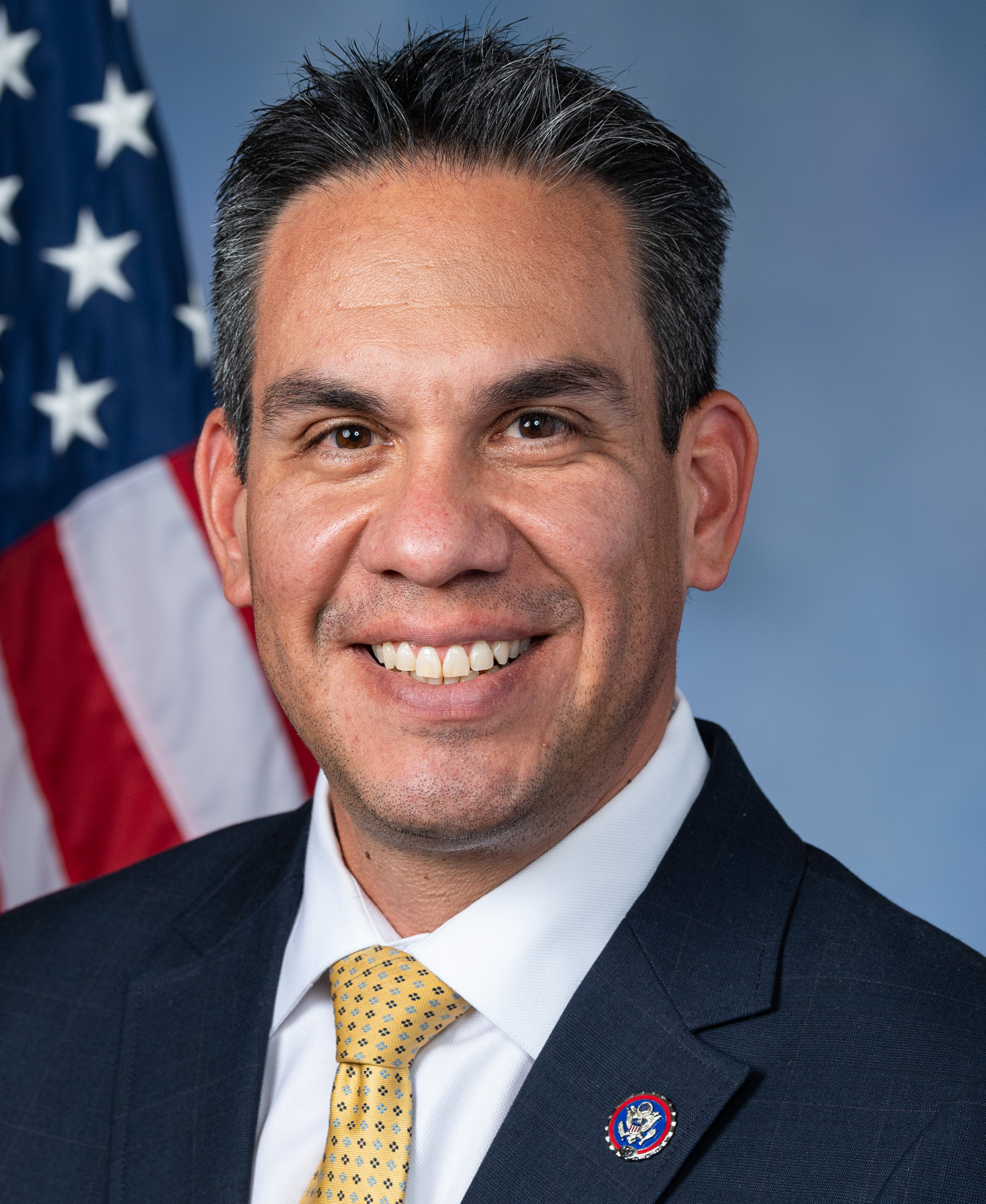

Candidate	Pete Aguilar	John Mark Porter
Party	Democratic	Republican
Popular vote	76,588	56,119
Percentage	57.7%	42.3%
- Block group results Aguilar: 50–60% 60–70% 70–80% 80–90% Porter: 50–60% 60–70% 70–80% 90–100% No results
U.S. Representative before election
Pete Aguilar
Democratic
Elected U.S. Representative
Pete Aguilar
Democratic

Due to redistricting, the incumbent changed from Democrat Ted Lieu to fellow Democrat Pete Aguilar. Aguilar, who had represented the 31st district since 2015, was re-elected with 61.3% of the vote in 2020.

=== Candidates ===
==== Advanced to general ====
- Pete Aguilar (Democratic), incumbent U.S. representative and vice chair of the House Democratic Caucus
- John Mark Porter (Republican), disaster response coordinator

==== Eliminated in primary ====
- Rex Gutierrez (Republican), pastor and former Rancho Cucamonga city councilor
- Ernest Richter (Republican), retired businessman

=== Endorsements ===
Pete Aguilar (D)

Organizations

- California Environmental Voters
- End Citizens United
- League of Conservation Voters
- Planned Parenthood Action Fund

Labor unions

- SEIU California
- United Auto Workers
- United Farm Workers

=== General election ===
==== Predictions ====
Source	Ranking	As of
The Cook Political Report	Solid D	December 21, 2021
Inside Elections	Solid D	December 28, 2021
Sabato's Crystal Ball	Safe D	January 4, 2022
Politico	Solid D	April 5, 2022
RCP	Safe D	June 9, 2022
Fox News	Solid D	July 11, 2022
DDHQ	Solid D	July 20, 2022
538	Solid D	June 30, 2022
The Economist	Safe D	September 7, 2022

=== Results ===
California's 33rd congressional district, 2022
Primary election
Party	Candidate	Votes	%
Democratic	Pete Aguilar (incumbent)	41,046	59.8
Republican	John Mark Porter	12,096	17.6
Republican	Rex Gutierrez	10,587	15.4
Republican	Ernest Richter	4,878	7.1
Total votes		68,607	100.0
General election
Democratic	Pete Aguilar (incumbent)	76,588	57.7
Republican	John Mark Porter	56,119	42.3
Total votes		132,707	100.0
Democratic hold			

==== By county ====
County	Pete Aguilar Democratic		John Mark Porter Republican		Margin		Total votes cast
County	#	%	#	%	#	%	Total votes cast
San Bernardino (part)	76,588	57.71%	56,119	42.29%	20,469	15.42%	132,707
Totals	76,588	57.71%	56,119	42.29%	20,469	15.42%	132,707

== District 34 ==
2022 California's 34th congressional district election
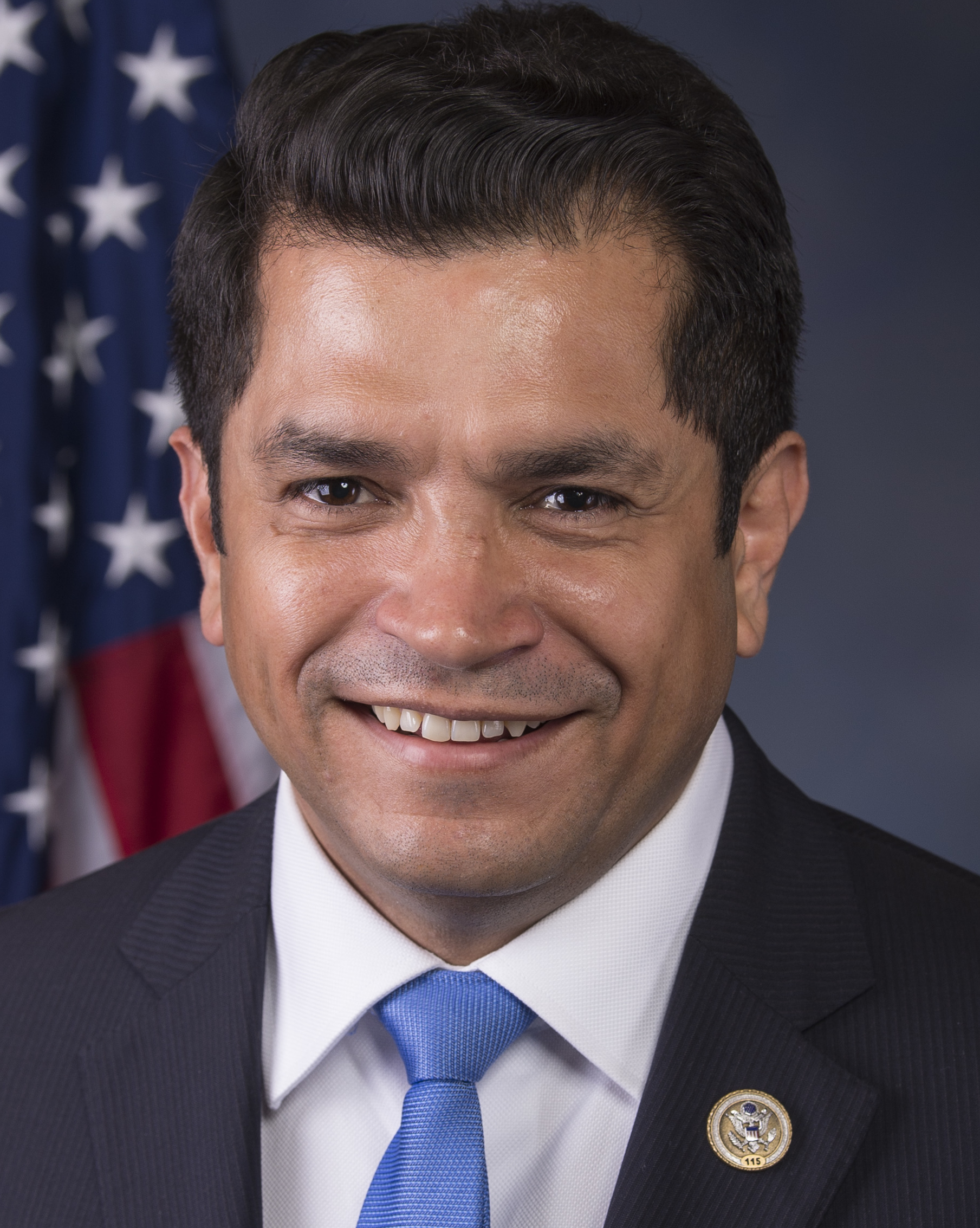

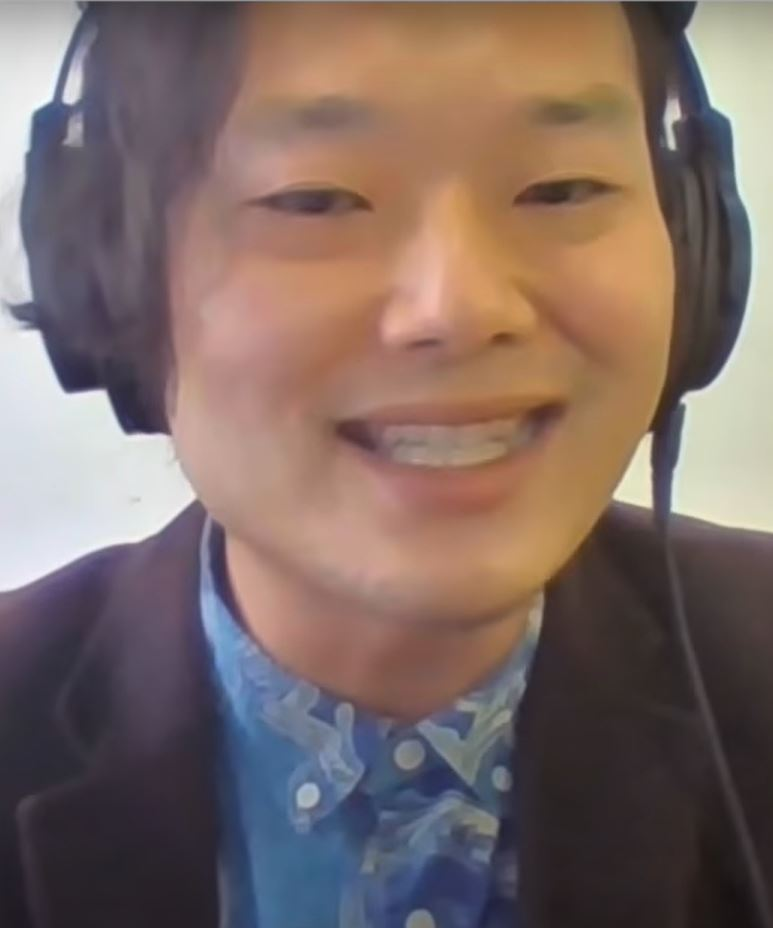
Candidate	Jimmy Gomez	David Kim
Party	Democratic	Democratic
Popular vote	62,244	59,223
Percentage	51.2%	48.8%
- Municipality results Gomez: 60–70% Kim: 50–60%
U.S. Representative before election
Jimmy Gomez
Democratic
Elected U.S. Representative
Jimmy Gomez
Democratic

Democrat Jimmy Gomez, who had represented the district since 2017, was re-elected with 53.0% of the vote in 2020.

The boundaries of the district were redrawn during the 2020 redistricting cycle and became effective on March 27, 2022, for the 2022 primary and general elections.

=== Candidates ===
==== Advanced to general ====
- Jimmy Gomez (Democratic), incumbent U.S. representative
- David Kim (Democratic), MacArthur Park neighborhood council board member and runner-up for this district in 2020

==== Eliminated in primary ====
- Clifton VonBuck (Republican), small business owner

=== Endorsements ===
Jimmy Gomez (D)

Organizations

- California Environmental Voters
- Planned Parenthood Action Fund
- Sierra Club

Labor unions

- SEIU California
- United Auto Workers
David Kim (D)

Individuals

- Marianne Williamson, author and candidate for president of the United States in 2020

=== General election ===
==== Predictions ====
Source	Ranking	As of
The Cook Political Report	Solid D	December 21, 2021
Inside Elections	Solid D	December 28, 2021
Sabato's Crystal Ball	Safe D	January 4, 2022
Politico	Solid D	April 5, 2022
RCP	Safe D	June 9, 2022
Fox News	Solid D	July 11, 2022
DDHQ	Solid D	July 20, 2022
538	Solid D	June 30, 2022
The Economist	Safe D	September 7, 2022

=== Results ===
California's 34th congressional district, 2022
Primary election
Party	Candidate	Votes	%
Democratic	Jimmy Gomez (incumbent)	45,376	50.7
Democratic	David Kim	34,921	39.0
Republican	Clifton VonBuck	9,150	10.2
Total votes		89,447	100.0
General election
Democratic	Jimmy Gomez (incumbent)	62,244	51.2
Democratic	David Kim	59,223	48.8
Total votes		121,467	100.0
Democratic hold			

==== By county ====
County	Jimmy Gomez Democratic		David Kim Democratic		Margin		Total votes cast
County	#	%	#	%	#	%	Total votes cast
Los Angeles (part)	62,244	51.24%	59,223	48.76%	3,021	2.49%	121,467
Totals	62,244	51.24%	59,223	48.76%	3,021	2.49%	121,467

== District 35 ==
2022 California's 35th congressional district election
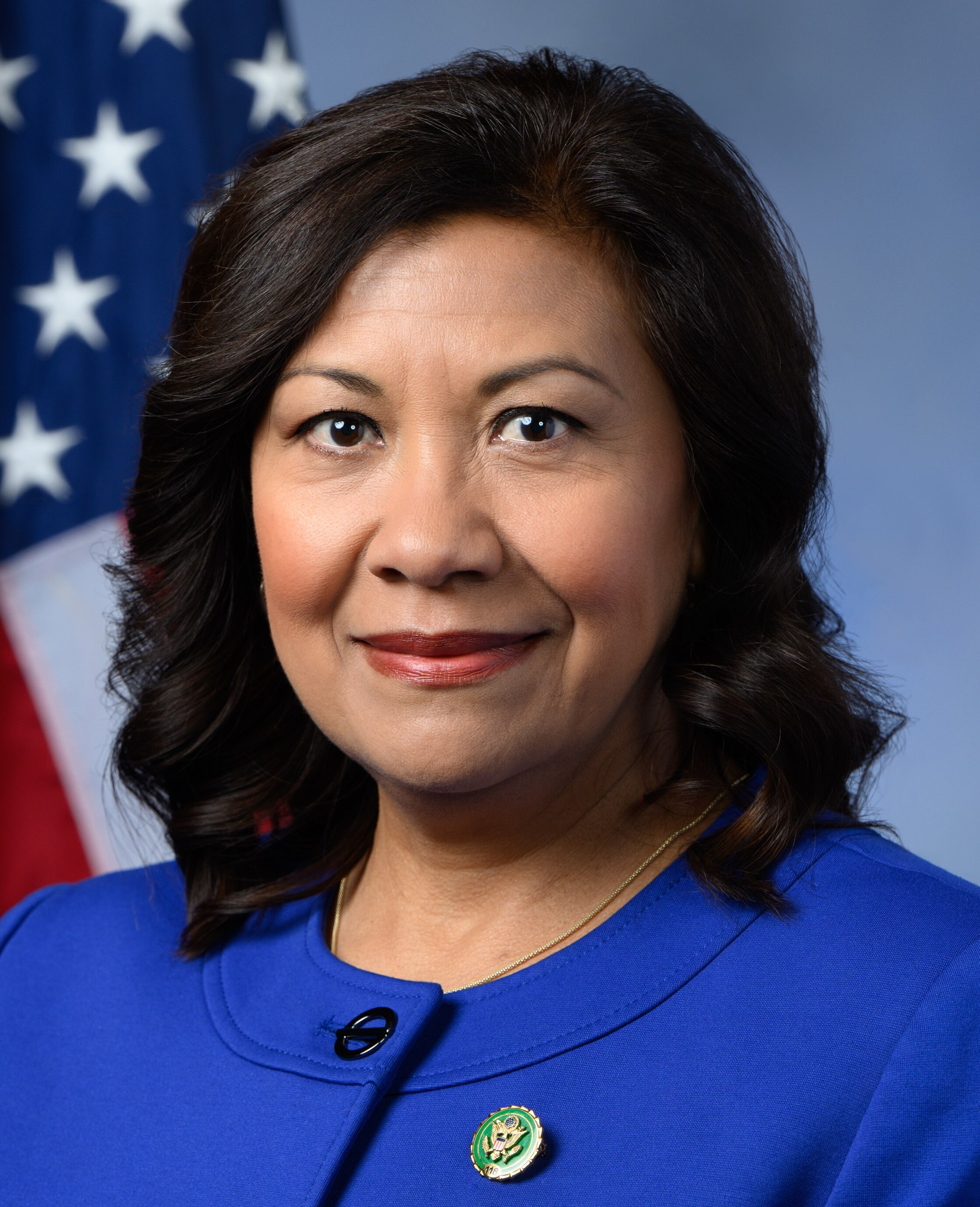

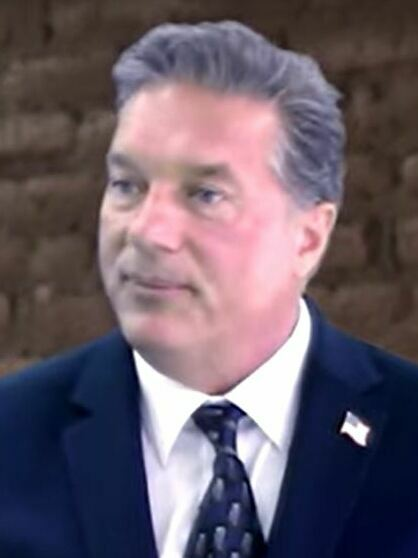
Candidate	Norma Torres	Mike Cargile
Party	Democratic	Republican
Popular vote	75,121	55,832
Percentage	57.4%	42.6%
- Torres: 50–60% 60–70% 70–80% 80–90% Cargile: 50–60% 60–70% Tie: 50% No results
U.S. Representative before election
Norma Torres
Democratic
Elected U.S. Representative
Norma Torres
Democratic

Democrat Norma Torres, who had represented the district since 2015, was re-elected with 69.3% of the vote in 2020.

The boundaries of the district were redrawn during the 2020 redistricting cycle and became effective on March 27, 2022, for the 2022 primary and general elections.

=== Candidates ===
==== Advanced to general ====
- Mike Cargile (Republican), independent filmmaker and runner-up for this district in 2020
- Norma Torres (Democratic), incumbent U.S. representative

==== Eliminated in primary ====
- Rafael Carcamo (Republican), physician and educator
- Bob Erbst (Republican), educator
- Lloyd Stevens (Democratic), systems analyst

=== Endorsements ===
Mike Cargile (R)

Individuals

- Nayib Bukele, president of El Salvador (2019–present)
Norma Torres (D)

Organizations

- California Environmental Voters
- Feminist Majority PAC
- NARAL Pro-Choice America
- Planned Parenthood Action Fund
- Pro-Israel America

Labor unions

- SEIU California
- United Auto Workers
- United Farm Workers

Newspapers

- Inland Valley Daily Bulletin

=== General election ===
==== Predictions ====
Source	Ranking	As of
The Cook Political Report	Solid D	December 21, 2021
Inside Elections	Solid D	December 28, 2021
Sabato's Crystal Ball	Safe D	January 4, 2022
Politico	Solid D	April 5, 2022
RCP	Safe D	June 9, 2022
Fox News	Solid D	July 11, 2022
DDHQ	Solid D	July 20, 2022
538	Solid D	June 30, 2022
The Economist	Safe D	September 7, 2022

=== Results ===
California's 35th congressional district, 2022
Primary election
Party	Candidate	Votes	%
Democratic	Norma Torres (incumbent)	37,554	54.3
Republican	Mike Cargile	17,431	25.2
Republican	Rafael Carcamo	7,619	11.0
Republican	Bob Erbst	3,480	5.0
Democratic	Lloyd Stevens	3,022	4.4
Total votes		69,106	100.0
General election
Democratic	Norma Torres (incumbent)	75,121	57.4
Republican	Mike Cargile	55,832	42.6
Total votes		130,953	100.0
Democratic hold			

==== By county ====
County	Norma Torres Democratic		Mike Cargile Republican		Margin		Total votes cast
County	#	%	#	%	#	%	Total votes cast
Los Angeles (part)	14,291	66.80%	7,104	33.20%	7,187	33.59%	21,395
Riverside (part)	5,310	49.32%	5,457	50.68%	−147	−1.37%	10,767
San Bernardino (part)	55,520	56.20%	43,271	43.80%	12,249	12.40%	98,791
Totals	75,121	57.36%	55,832	42.64%	19,289	14.73%	130,953

== District 36 ==
2022 California's 36th congressional district election
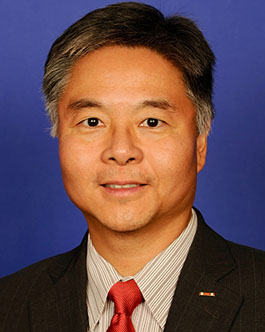

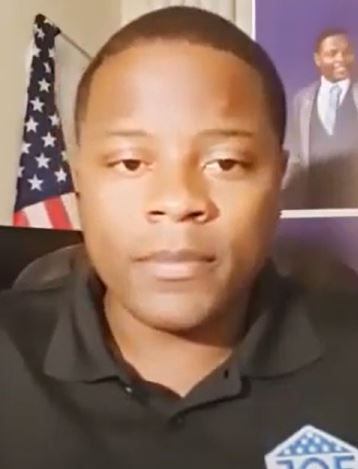
Candidate	Ted Lieu	Joe Collins III
Party	Democratic	Republican
Popular vote	194,299	84,264
Percentage	69.8%	30.2%
- Block group results Lieu: 50–60% 60–70% 70–80% 80–90% 90–100% Collins: 50–60% 60–70% No results
U.S. Representative before election
Ted Lieu
Democratic
Elected U.S. Representative
Ted Lieu
Democratic

Due to redistricting, the incumbent changed from Democrat Raul Ruiz to fellow Democrat Ted Lieu, who had represented the 33rd district since 2015, and was re-elected with 67.6% of the vote in 2020.

=== Candidates ===
==== Advanced to general ====
- Joe Collins III (Republican), financial consultant, U.S. Navy veteran, and runner-up for the 43rd district in 2020
- Ted Lieu (Democratic), incumbent U.S. representative

==== Eliminated in primary ====
- Derrick Gates (Republican), pastor and mortgage broker
- Ariana Hakami (Republican), financial advisor
- Matthew Jesuele (no party preference), software engineer
- Colin Obrien (Democratic), writer
- Claire Ragge (Republican), bar owner
- Steve Williams (no party preference), real estate broker

=== Endorsements ===
Joe Collins (R)

Organizations

- Black America's Political Action Committee
Ted Lieu (D)

Organizations

- California Environmental Voters
- Feminist Majority PAC
- Natural Resources Defense Council
- Planned Parenthood Action Fund
- Progressive Democrats of America
- Pro-Israel America
- Sierra Club

Labor unions

- SEIU California
- United Auto Workers

=== General election ===
==== Predictions ====
Source	Ranking	As of
The Cook Political Report	Solid D	December 21, 2021
Inside Elections	Solid D	December 28, 2021
Sabato's Crystal Ball	Safe D	January 4, 2022
Politico	Solid D	April 5, 2022
RCP	Safe D	June 9, 2022
Fox News	Solid D	July 11, 2022
DDHQ	Solid D	July 20, 2022
538	Solid D	June 30, 2022
The Economist	Safe D	September 7, 2022

=== Results ===
California's 36th congressional district, 2022
Primary election
Party	Candidate	Votes	%
Democratic	Ted Lieu (incumbent)	122,969	67.1
Republican	Joe Collins III	24,553	13.4
Republican	Derrick Gates	10,263	5.6
Republican	Ariana Hakami	9,760	5.3
Republican	Claire Ragge	7,351	4.0
Democratic	Colin Obrien	6,221	3.4
No party preference	Steve Williams	1,180	0.6
No party preference	Matthew Jesuele	976	0.5
Total votes		183,273	100.0
General election
Democratic	Ted Lieu (incumbent)	194,299	69.8
Republican	Joe Collins III	84,264	30.2
Total votes		278,563	100.0
Democratic hold			

==== By county ====
County	Ted Lieu Democratic		Joe Collins III Republican		Margin		Total votes cast
County	#	%	#	%	#	%	Total votes cast
Los Angeles (part)	194,299	69.75%	84,264	30.25%	110,035	39.50%	278,563
Totals	194,299	69.75%	84,264	30.25%	110,035	39.50%	278,563

== District 37 ==
2022 California's 37th congressional district election
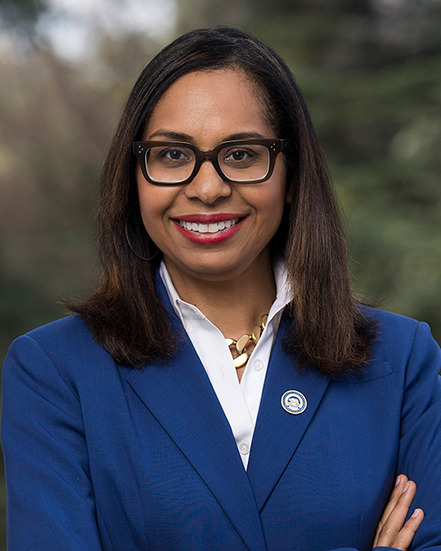

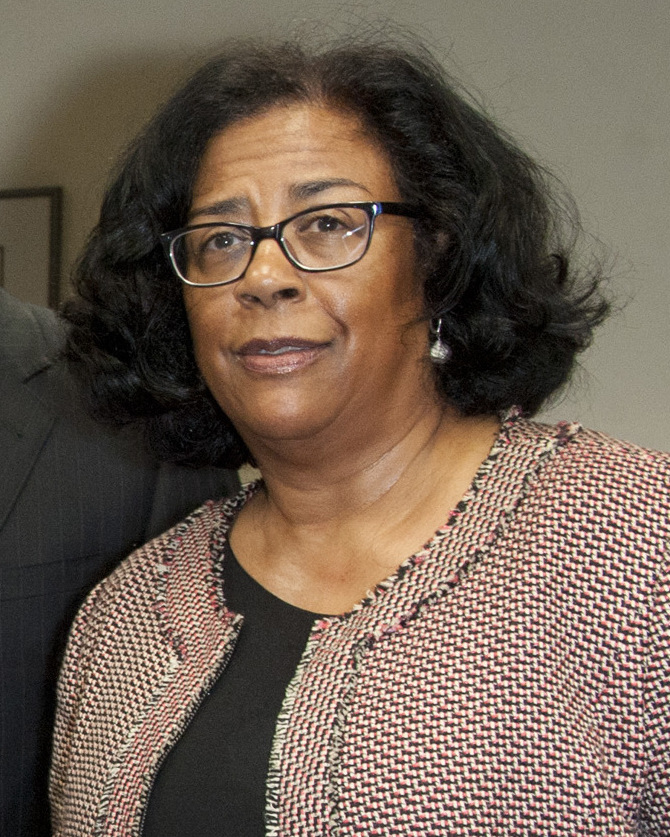
Candidate	Sydney Kamlager-Dove	Jan Perry
Party	Democratic	Democratic
Popular vote	84,338	47,542
Percentage	64.0%	36.0%
- Block group results Kamlager-Dove: 50–60% 60–70% 70–80% Perry: 50–60% No results
U.S. Representative before election
Karen Bass
Democratic
Elected U.S. Representative
Sydney Kamlager-Dove
Democratic

Democrat Karen Bass, who had represented the district since 2013, was re-elected with 85.9% of the vote in 2020. Bass announced that she would be retiring to run for mayor of Los Angeles.

=== Candidates ===
==== Advanced to general ====
- Sydney Kamlager-Dove (Democratic), state senator
- Jan Perry (Democratic), former Los Angeles City Councillor, candidate for mayor of Los Angeles in 2013, and candidate for District 2 of the Los Angeles County Board of Supervisors in 2020

==== Eliminated in primary ====
- Chris Champion (Republican), business owner
- Baltazar Fedalizo (Republican), businessman
- Daniel Lee (Democratic), mayor of Culver City
- Sandra Mendoza (Democratic), program manager and perennial candidate
- Michael Shure (Democratic), NewsNation national correspondent

==== Withdrew ====
- Jamaal Gulledge (Democratic), University of California Los Angeles staffer (ran for state senate)

==== Declined ====
- Karen Bass (Democratic), incumbent U.S. representative (running for mayor of Los Angeles, endorsed Kamlager-Dove)

=== Endorsements ===
Sydney Kamlager-Dove (D)

Federal officials

- Karen Bass, U.S. representative for California's 37th congressional district
- Pramila Jayapal, U.S. representative for Washington's 7th congressional district (2017–present)
- Ted Lieu, U.S. representative for California's 36th congressional district

State officials

- Ricardo Lara, California Insurance Commissioner
- Tony Thurmond, California State Superintendent of Public Instruction
- Shirley Weber, California Secretary of State

State legislators

- Ben Allen, state senator
- Steve Bradford, state senator
- Maria Durazo, state senator
- Mike Gipson, state assemblyman
- Chris Holden, state assemblyman

Local officials

- Marqueece Harris-Dawson, Los Angeles City Councillor
- Holly Mitchell, Los Angeles County supervisor and former state senator
- Curren Price, Los Angeles City Councillor

Organizations

- California Environmental Voters
- Democracy for America
- EMILY's List
- Equality California
- League of Conservation Voters Action Fund
- Planned Parenthood Action Fund
- Sierra Club

Labor unions

- SEIU California
- United Auto Workers
Daniel Lee (D)

Individuals

- Marianne Williamson, author and candidate for president of the United States in 2020

=== Polling ===
Poll source	Date(s) administered	Sample size	Margin of error	Sydney Kamlager-Dove (D)	Jan Perry (D)	Michael Shure (D)	Other	Undecided
RMG Research	May 19–20, 2022	500 (LV)	± 4.5%	17%	5%	2%	16%	59%

=== General election ===
==== Predictions ====
Source	Ranking	As of
The Cook Political Report	Solid D	December 21, 2021
Inside Elections	Solid D	December 28, 2021
Sabato's Crystal Ball	Safe D	January 4, 2022
Politico	Solid D	April 5, 2022
RCP	Safe D	June 9, 2022
Fox News	Solid D	July 11, 2022
DDHQ	Solid D	July 20, 2022
538	Solid D	June 30, 2022
The Economist	Safe D	September 7, 2022

==== Post-primary endorsements ====
Sydney Kamlager-Dove

Organizations

- Giffords

=== Results ===
California's 37th congressional district, 2022
Primary election
Party	Candidate	Votes	%
Democratic	Sydney Kamlager-Dove	42,628	43.7
Democratic	Jan Perry	17,993	18.5
Democratic	Daniel Lee	17,414	17.9
Democratic	Sandra Mendoza	8,017	8.2
Republican	Chris Champion	5,469	5.6
Republican	Baltazar Fedalizo	3,520	3.6
Democratic	Michael Shure	2,469	2.5
Total votes		97,510	100.0
General election
Democratic	Sydney Kamlager-Dove	84,338	64.0
Democratic	Jan Perry	47,542	36.0
Total votes		131,880	100.0
Democratic hold			

==== By county ====
County	Sydney Kamlager-Dove Democratic		Jan Perry Democratic		Margin		Total votes cast
County	#	%	#	%	#	%	Total votes cast
Los Angeles (part)	84,338	63.95%	47,542	36.05%	36,796	27.90%	131,880
Totals	84,338	63.95%	47,542	36.05%	36,796	27.90%	131,880

== District 38 ==
2022 California's 38th congressional district election
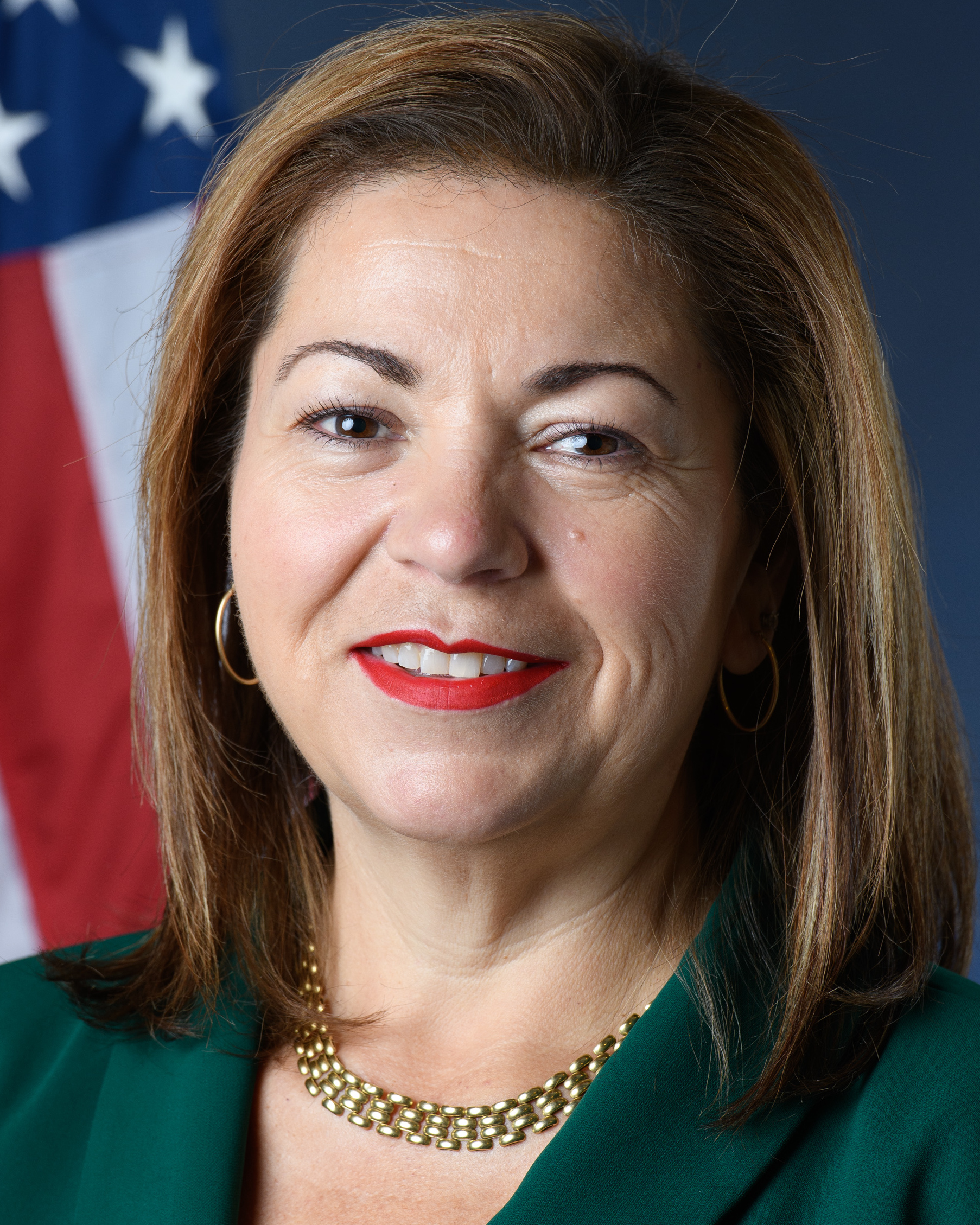

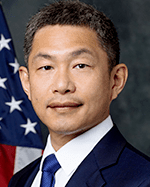
Candidate	Linda Sánchez	Eric Ching
Party	Democratic	Republican
Popular vote	101,260	73,051
Percentage	58.1%	41.9%
- Block group results Sánchez: 50–60% 60–70% 70–80% 80–90% 90–100% Ching: 50–60% 60–70% No results
U.S. Representative before election
Linda Sánchez
Democratic
Elected U.S. Representative
Linda Sánchez
Democratic

Democrat Linda Sánchez, who had represented the district since 2013, was re-elected with 74.3% of the vote in 2020.

=== Candidates ===
==== Advanced to general ====
- Eric Ching (Republican), mayor of Walnut
- Linda Sánchez (Democratic), incumbent U.S. representative

==== Eliminated in primary ====
- John Sarega (Republican), pastor

=== Endorsements ===
Linda Sánchez (D)

Organizations

- California Environmental Voters
- Planned Parenthood Action Fund
- Sierra Club

Labor unions

- SEIU California
- United Auto Workers

=== General election ===
==== Predictions ====
Source	Ranking	As of
The Cook Political Report	Solid D	December 21, 2021
Inside Elections	Solid D	December 28, 2021
Sabato's Crystal Ball	Safe D	January 4, 2022
Politico	Solid D	April 5, 2022
RCP	Safe D	June 9, 2022
Fox News	Solid D	July 11, 2022
DDHQ	Solid D	July 20, 2022
538	Solid D	June 30, 2022
The Economist	Safe D	September 7, 2022

=== Results ===
California's 38th congressional district, 2022
Primary election
Party	Candidate	Votes	%
Democratic	Linda Sánchez (incumbent)	58,586	58.7
Republican	Eric Ching	30,436	30.5
Republican	John Sarega	10,768	10.8
Total votes		99,790	100.0
General election
Democratic	Linda Sánchez (incumbent)	101,260	58.1
Republican	Eric Ching	73,051	41.9
Total votes		174,311	100.0
Democratic hold			

==== By county ====
County	Linda Sánchez Democratic		Eric Ching Republican		Margin		Total votes cast
County	#	%	#	%	#	%	Total votes cast
Los Angeles (part)	93,514	58.76%	65,643	41.24%	27,871	17.51%	159,157
Orange (part)	7,746	51.12%	7,408	48.88%	338	2.23%	15,154
Totals	101,260	58.09	73,051	41.91%	28,209	16.18%	174,311

== District 39 ==
2022 California's 39th congressional district election
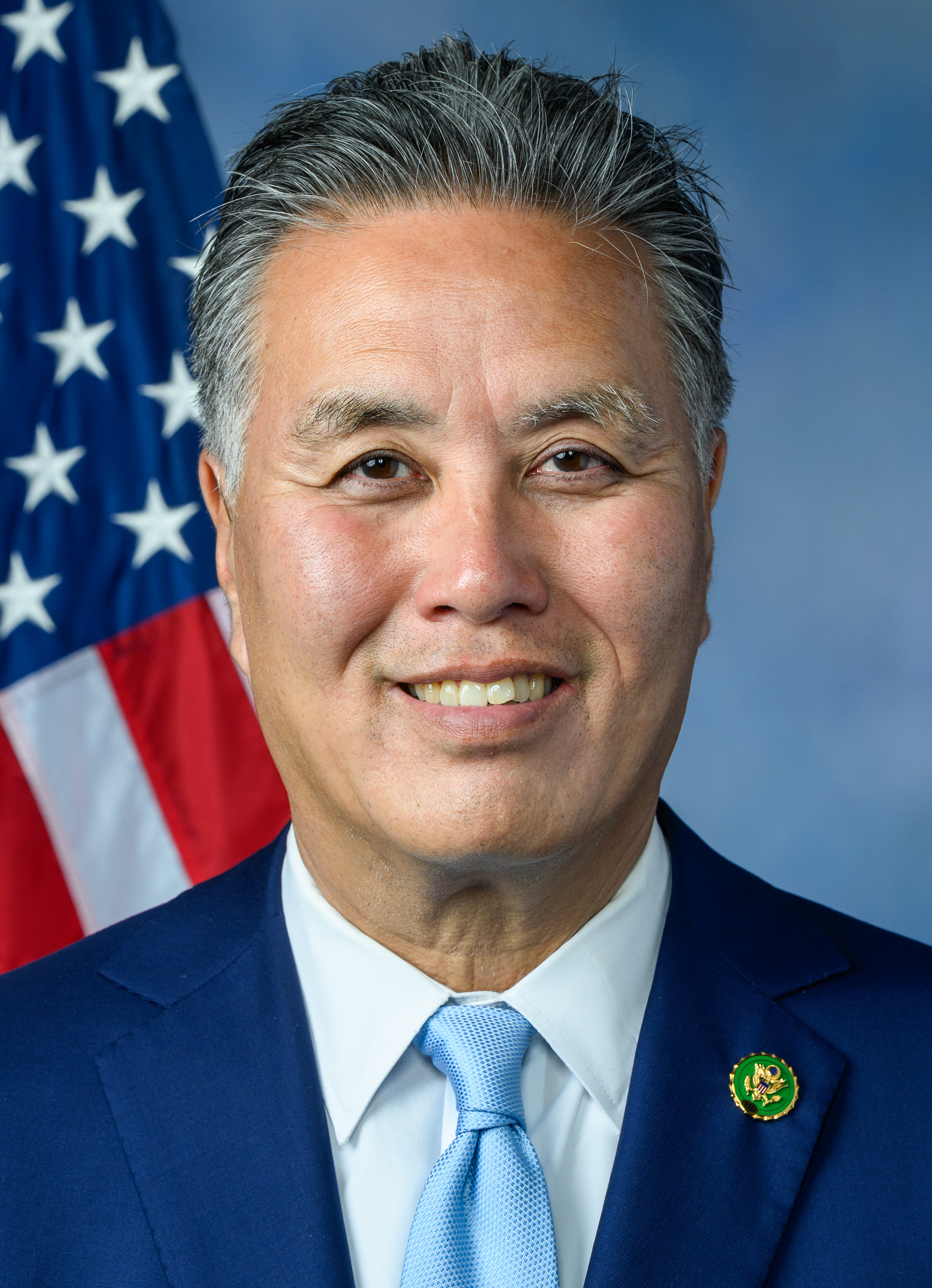

Candidate	Mark Takano	Aja Smith
Party	Democratic	Republican
Popular vote	75,896	55,701
Percentage	57.7%	42.3%
- Block group results Takano: 50–60% 60–70% 70–80% 80–90% Smith: 50–60% 60–70% 70–80% No results
U.S. Representative before election
Mark Takano
Democratic
Elected U.S. Representative
Mark Takano
Democratic

Due to redistricting, the incumbent changed from Republican Young Kim to Democrat Mark Takano, who had represented the 41st district since 2013. Takano was re-elected with 64.0% of the vote in 2020.

=== Candidates ===
==== Advanced to general ====
- Aja Smith (Republican), small business owner and runner-up for this district in 2020
- Mark Takano (Democratic), incumbent U.S. representative

==== Eliminated in primary ====
- John Minnella (Republican), small business owner
- Tony Moreno (Republican), businessman
- Arthur Peterson (Republican), former member of the Wisconsin State Assembly (1951–1955) and the Montana House of Representatives (2000–2002)
- Bill Spinney (Republican), retired businessman
- Emmanuel Suarez (Republican), poolman and caretaker

=== Endorsements ===
Mark Takano (D)

Organizations

- California Environmental Voters
- Planned Parenthood Action Fund
- Progressive Democrats of America
- Stonewall Democrats

Labor unions

- SEIU California
- United Auto Workers

=== General election ===
==== Predictions ====
Source	Ranking	As of
The Cook Political Report	Solid D	December 21, 2021
Inside Elections	Solid D	December 28, 2021
Sabato's Crystal Ball	Safe D	January 4, 2022
Politico	Solid D	April 5, 2022
RCP	Safe D	June 9, 2022
Fox News	Solid D	July 11, 2022
DDHQ	Solid D	July 20, 2022
538	Solid D	June 30, 2022
The Economist	Safe D	September 7, 2022

=== Results ===
California's 39th congressional district, 2022
Primary election
Party	Candidate	Votes	%
Democratic	Mark Takano (incumbent)	44,067	57.1
Republican	Aja Smith	9,751	12.6
Republican	Bill Spinney	7,421	9.6
Republican	Tony Moreno	5,527	7.2
Republican	Arthur Peterson	5,081	6.6
Republican	John Minnella	3,662	4.7
Republican	Emmanuel Suarez	1,600	2.1
Total votes		77,109	100.0
General election
Democratic	Mark Takano (incumbent)	75,896	57.7
Republican	Aja Smith	55,701	42.3
Total votes		131,597	100.0
Democratic hold			

==== By county ====
County	Mark Takano Democratic		Aja Smith Republican		Margin		Total votes cast
County	#	%	#	%	#	%	Total votes cast
Riverside (part)	75,896	57.67%	55,701	42.33%	20,195	15.35%	131,597
Totals	75,896	57.67%	55,701	42.33%	20,195	15.35%	131,597

== District 40 ==
2022 California's 40th congressional district election
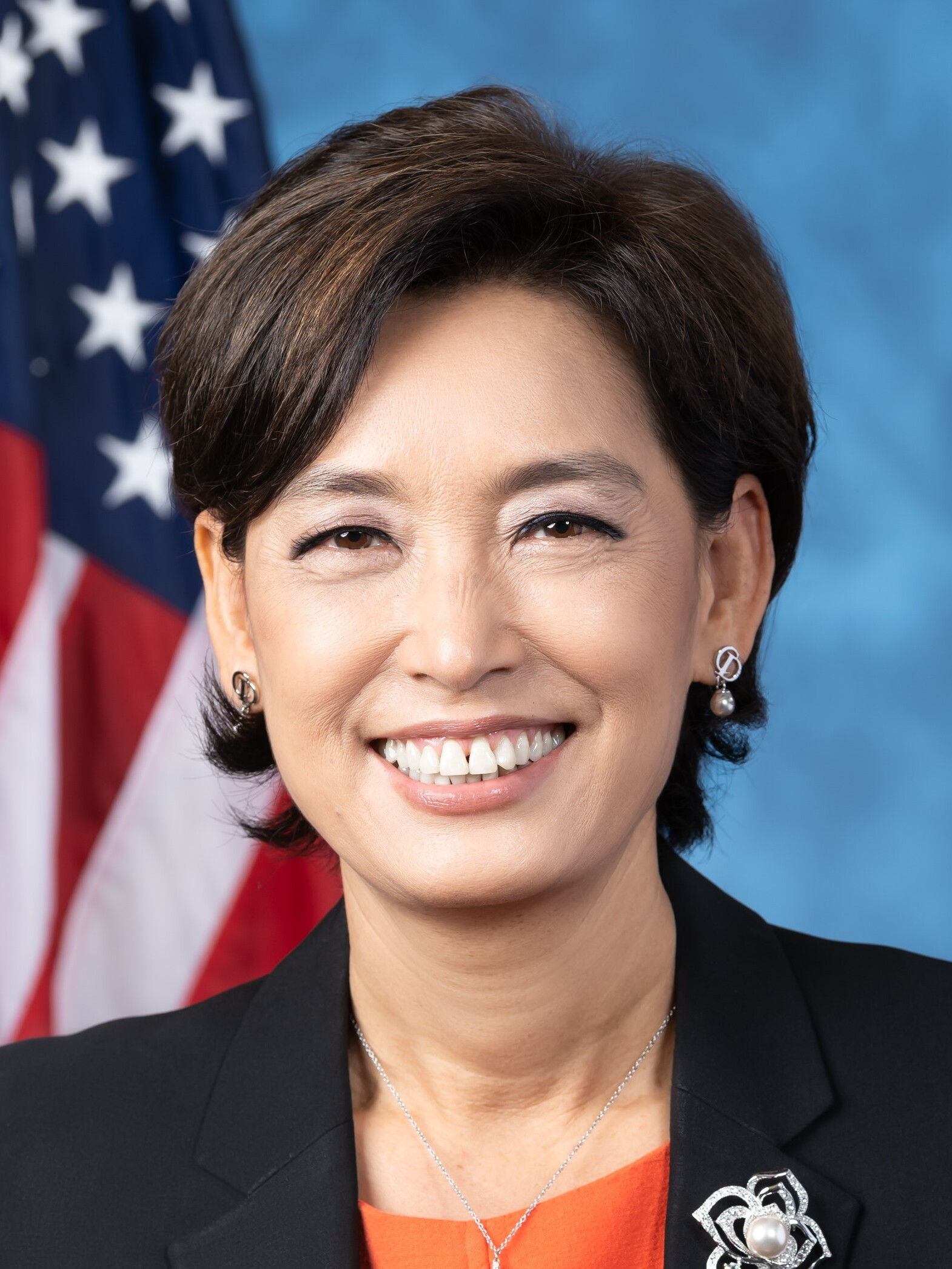

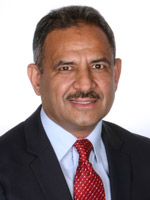
Candidate	Young Kim	Asif Mahmood
Party	Republican	Democratic
Popular vote	161,589	122,722
Percentage	56.8%	43.2%
- Kim: 50–60% 60–70% 70–80% Mahmood: 50–60% 60–70% Tie: 50% No results
U.S. Representative before election
Young Kim
Republican
Elected U.S. Representative
Young Kim
Republican

Due to redistricting, the incumbent changed from Democrat Lucille Roybal-Allard to Republican Young Kim. Kim, who had represented the 39th district since 2021, was elected with 50.6% of the vote in 2020. Kim was running for re-election. The New York Times reported that Mahmood had aired ads undermining Kim by only mentioning her primary opponent Greg Raths, as part of a Democratic strategy to support further-right Republican primary candidates to make for an easier opponent in general elections in November.

=== Candidates ===
==== Advanced to general ====
- Young Kim (Republican), incumbent U.S. representative
- Asif Mahmood (Democratic), pulmonologist, member of the Medical Board of California, and candidate for California Insurance Commissioner in 2018

==== Eliminated in primary ====
- Greg Raths (Republican), Mission Viejo city councilor, former mayor of Mission Viejo, candidate for the 45th district in 2014 and 2016, and runner-up in 2020
- Nick Taurus (Republican), activist

=== Endorsements ===
Young Kim (R)

Executive branch officials

- Nikki Haley, former U.S. Ambassador to the United Nations (2017–2019) and former governor of South Carolina (2011–2017)

U.S. senators

- Tim Scott, U.S. senator from South Carolina

U.S. representatives

- Ken Calvert, U.S. representative for California's 42nd congressional district
- Ed Royce, former U.S. representative for California's 39th congressional district
- Michelle Steel, U.S. representative for California's 48th congressional district
- Mimi Walters, former U.S. representative for California's 45th congressional district

Organizations

- Maggie's List
- Pro-Israel America
- Republican Jewish Coalition
Asif Mahmood (D)

Executive branch officials

- Hillary Clinton, former U.S. Secretary of State (2009–2013), former U.S. senator from New York (2001–2009), and former First Lady of the United States (1993–2001)

U.S. senators

- Cory Booker, U.S. senator form New Jersey (2013–)

U.S. representatives

- Tony Cárdenas, U.S. representative for California's 29th congressional district
- Mike Levin, U.S. representative for California's 49th congressional district
- Gregory Meeks, U.S. representative for New York's 5th congressional district

State officials

- Rob Bonta, California Attorney General
- Eleni Kounalakis, lieutenant governor of California
- Ricardo Lara, California Insurance Commissioner
- Betty Yee, California State Controller

Organizations

- 314 Action Fund
- AAPI Victory Fund (post-primary)
- ASPIRE PAC
- End Citizens United (post-primary)
- League of Conservation Voters Action Fund (post-primary)
- Let America Vote (post-primary)
- NARAL Pro-Choice America
- Planned Parenthood Action Fund
- Sierra Club

Labor unions

- SEIU California (post-primary)
- United Auto Workers

Newspapers

- Los Angeles Times (post-primary)

=== General election ===
==== Predictions ====
Source	Ranking	As of
The Cook Political Report	Likely R	June 28, 2022
Inside Elections	Likely R	December 28, 2021
Sabato's Crystal Ball	Likely R	January 4, 2022
Politico	Likely R	August 12, 2022
RCP	Likely R	October 7, 2022
Fox News	Likely R	November 1, 2022
DDHQ	Likely R	July 20, 2022
538	Solid R	June 30, 2022
The Economist	Likely R	September 7, 2022

==== Polling ====
Poll source	Date(s) administered	Sample size	Margin of error	Young Kim (R)	Asif Mahmood (D)	Undecided
Public Opinion Strategies (R) (Note: Poll sponsored jointly by the National Republican Congressional Committee and Kim's campaign committee)	July 16–20, 2022	400 (LV)	± 4.9%	51%	35%	13%

Hypothetical polling

Generic Republican vs. generic Democrat

Poll source	Date(s) administered	Sample size	Margin of error	Generic Republican	Generic Democrat	Undecided
Public Opinion Strategies (R)	July 16–20, 2022	400 (LV)	± 4.9%	45%	40%	13%

=== Results ===
California's 40th congressional district, 2022
Primary election
Party	Candidate	Votes	%
Democratic	Asif Mahmood	74,607	40.9
Republican	Young Kim (incumbent)	63,346	34.7
Republican	Greg Raths	42,404	23.2
Republican	Nick Taurus	2,193	1.2
Total votes		182,550	100.0
General election
Republican	Young Kim (incumbent)	161,589	56.8
Democratic	Asif Mahmood	122,722	43.2
Total votes		284,311	100.0
Republican hold			

==== By county ====
County	Young Kim Republican		Asif Mahmood Democratic		Margin		Total votes cast
County	#	%	#	%	#	%	Total votes cast
Orange (part)	149,297	56.75%	113,787	43.25%	35,510	13.50%	263,084
Riverside (part)	1,847	58.93%	1,287	41.07%	560	17.87%	3,134
San Bernardino (part)	10,445	57.73%	7,648	42.27%	2,797	15.46%	18,093
Totals	161,589	56.84%	122,722	43.16%	38,867	13.67%	284,311

== District 41 ==
2022 California's 41st congressional district election
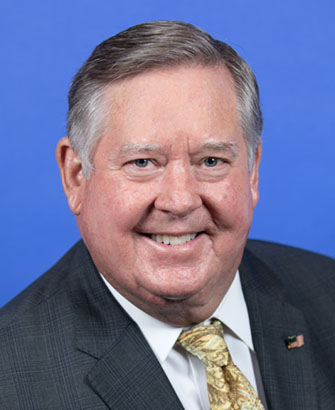

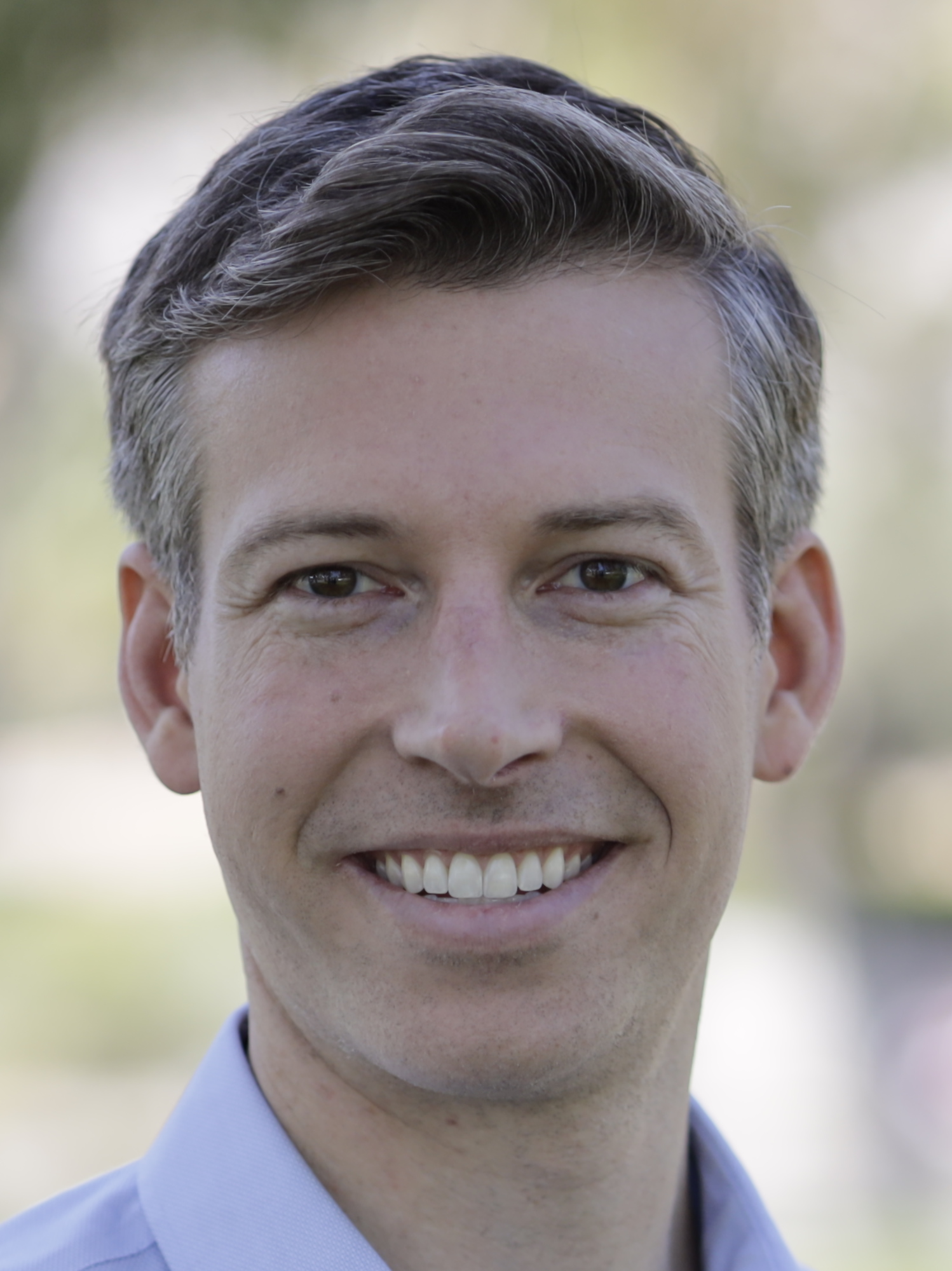
Candidate	Ken Calvert	Will Rollins
Party	Republican	Democratic
Popular vote	123,869	112,769
Percentage	52.3%	47.7%
- Block group results Calvert: 50–60% 60–70% 70–80% 80–90% 90–100% Rollins: 50–60% 60–70% 70–80% 80–90% No results
U.S. Representative before election
Ken Calvert
Republican
Elected U.S. Representative
Ken Calvert
Republican

Due to redistricting, the incumbent changed from Democrat Mark Takano to Republican Ken Calvert. Calvert, who had represented the 42nd district since 2013, was re-elected with 57.1% of the vote in 2020.

=== Candidates ===
==== Advanced to general ====
- Ken Calvert (Republican), incumbent U.S. representative
- Will Rollins (Democratic), former federal prosecutor

==== Eliminated in primary ====
- Shrina Kurani (Democratic), engineer and entrepreneur
- John Michael Lucio (Republican)
- Anna Nevenic (no party preference)

=== Endorsements ===
Ken Calvert (R)

Executive branch officials

- Donald Trump, 45th president of the United States (2017–2021)
Will Rollins (D)

Newspapers

- The Desert Sun (post-primary)

Organizations

- End Citizens United (post-primary)
- Human Rights Campaign PAC
- League of Conservation Voters
- Let America Vote (post-primary)
- LGBTQ Victory Fund
- New Politics
- Sierra Club

=== General election ===
==== Predictions ====
Source	Ranking	As of
The Cook Political Report	Lean R	June 28, 2022
Inside Elections	Solid R	August 25, 2022
Sabato's Crystal Ball	Likely R	January 4, 2022
Politico	Lean R	October 18, 2022
RCP	Lean R	June 9, 2022
Fox News	Likely R	July 11, 2022
DDHQ	Likely R	July 21, 2022
538	Solid R	November 1, 2022
The Economist	Likely R	September 7, 2022

==== Polling ====
Poll source	Date(s) administered	Sample size	Margin of error	Ken Calvert (R)	Will Rollins (D)	Undecided
Tulchin Research (D)	September 28 – October 2, 2022	600 (LV)	–	47%	44%	9%
ApplecartUSA (D) (Note: Poll sponsored by WelcomePAC, which supports Rollins)	July 22–27, 2022	1,260 (RV)	–	47%	39%	14%
Tulchin Research (D)	February 25 – March 3, 2022	600 (LV)	± 4.0%	41%	42%	18%

=== Results ===
California's 41st congressional district, 2022
Primary election
Party	Candidate	Votes	%
Republican	Ken Calvert (incumbent)	72,700	48.2
Democratic	Will Rollins	45,923	30.4
Democratic	Shrina Kurani	23,483	15.6
Republican	John Michael Lucio	6,880	4.6
No party preference	Anna Nevenic	1,862	1.2
Total votes		150,848	100.0
General election
Republican	Ken Calvert (incumbent)	123,869	52.3
Democratic	Will Rollins	112,769	47.7
Total votes		236,638	100.0
Republican hold			

==== By county ====
County	Ken Calvert Republican		Will Rollins Democratic		Margin		Total votes cast
County	#	%	#	%	#	%	Total votes cast
Riverside (part)	123,869	52.35%	112,769	47.65%	11,100	4.69%	236,638
Totals	123,869	52.35%	112,769	47.65%	11,100	4.69%	236,638

== District 42 ==
2022 California's 42nd congressional district election
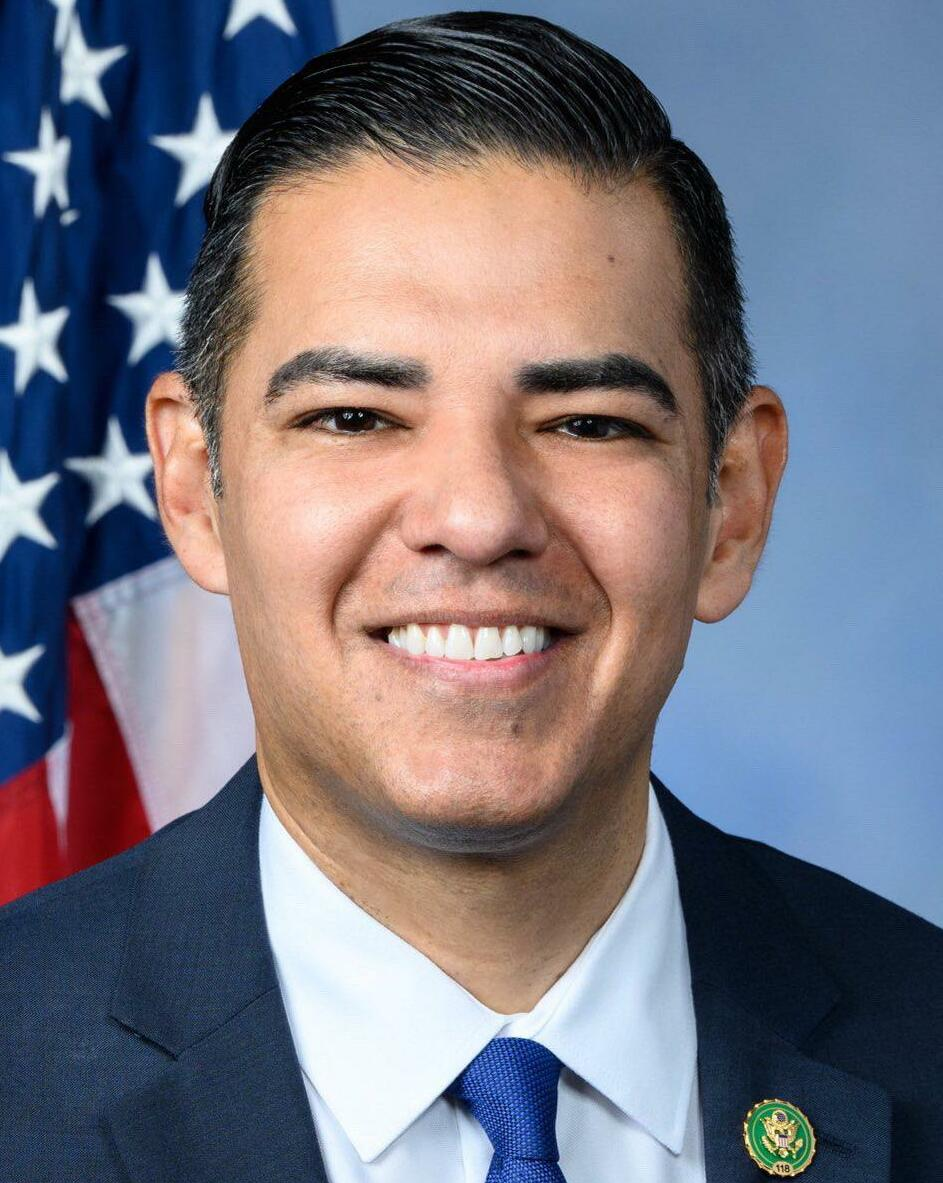

Candidate	Robert Garcia	John Briscoe
Party	Democratic	Republican
Popular vote	99,217	45,903
Percentage	68.4%	31.6%
- Block group results Garcia: 50–60% 60–70% 70–80% 80–90% 90–100% Briscoe: 50–60% Tie: 50% No results
U.S. Representative before election
Lucille Roybal-Allard (Democrat)
Alan Lowenthal (Democrat)
Elected U.S. Representative
Robert Garcia
Democratic

Due to redistricting, the incumbent changed from Republican Ken Calvert to Democrats Lucille Roybal-Allard and Alan Lowenthal, whose districts were combined. Roybal-Allard, who had represented the 40th district since 2013, was re-elected with 72.7% of the vote in 2020. Lowenthal, who had represented the 47th district since 2013, was re-elected with 63.3% of the vote in 2020. Both Roybal-Allard and Lowenthal were retiring.

=== Candidates ===
==== Advanced to general ====
- John Briscoe (Republican), Ocean View School District trustee and runner-up for this district in 2018 and 2020
- Robert Garcia (Democratic), mayor of Long Beach

==== Eliminated in primary ====
- Joaquín Beltrán (Democratic), engineer and community organizer
- Julio Flores (Green), education administrator
- Cristina Garcia (Democratic), state assemblywoman
- Nicole López (Democratic), voter registration professional
- Peter Mathews (Democratic), college professor and perennial candidate
- William Summerville (Democratic), pastor

==== Withdrew ====
- William Griffith (no party preference)

==== Declined ====
- Lena Gonzalez (Democratic), state senator (endorsed Robert Garcia)
- Alan Lowenthal (Democratic), incumbent U.S. representative
- Lucille Roybal-Allard (Democratic), incumbent U.S. representative

=== Endorsements ===
Cristina Garcia (D)

Individuals

- Marianne Williamson, author and candidate for president of the United States in 2020
Robert Garcia (D)

U.S. representatives

- Pramila Jayapal, U.S. representative for Washington's 7th congressional district (2017–)

State officials

- Rob Bonta, California Attorney General
- Gavin Newsom, governor of California

State legislators

- Lena Gonzalez, state senator
- Scott Wiener, state senator

Local politicians

- Christopher Cabaldon, former mayor of West Sacramento
- Todd Gloria, mayor of San Diego
- Libby Schaaf, mayor of Oakland

Individuals

- Billie Jean King, former professional tennis player

Organizations

- Democracy for America
- End Citizens United
- Equality California
- Giffords (post-primary)
- Human Rights Campaign PAC
- League of Conservation Voters Action Fund (post-primary)
- LGBTQ Victory Fund
- NARAL Pro-Choice America (post-primary)
- Sierra Club

Labor unions

- SEIU California
- United Auto Workers

Newspapers

- Press-Telegram

=== General election ===
==== Predictions ====
Source	Ranking	As of
The Cook Political Report	Solid D	December 21, 2021
Inside Elections	Solid D	December 28, 2021
Sabato's Crystal Ball	Safe D	January 4, 2022
Politico	Solid D	April 5, 2022
RCP	Safe D	June 9, 2022
Fox News	Solid D	July 11, 2022
DDHQ	Solid D	July 20, 2022
538	Solid D	June 30, 2022
The Economist	Safe D	September 7, 2022

=== Results ===
California's 42nd congressional district, 2022
Primary election
Party	Candidate	Votes	%
Democratic	Robert Garcia	43,406	46.7
Republican	John Briscoe	24,319	26.1
Democratic	Cristina Garcia	11,685	12.6
Democratic	Peter Mathews	3,415	3.7
Democratic	Nicole López	3,164	3.4
Green	Julio Flores	2,491	2.7
Democratic	William Summerville	2,301	2.5
Democratic	Joaquín Beltrán	2,254	2.4
Total votes		93,035	100.0
General election
Democratic	Robert Garcia	99,217	68.4
Republican	John Briscoe	45,903	31.6
Total votes		145,120	100.0
Democratic hold			

==== By county ====
County	Robert Garcia Democratic		John Briscoe Republican		Margin		Total votes cast
County	#	%	#	%	#	%	Total votes cast
Los Angeles (part)	99,217	68.37%	45,903	31.63%	53,314	36.74%	145,120
Totals	99,217	68.37%	45,903	31.63%	53,314	36.74%	145,120

== District 43 ==
2022 California's 43rd congressional district election
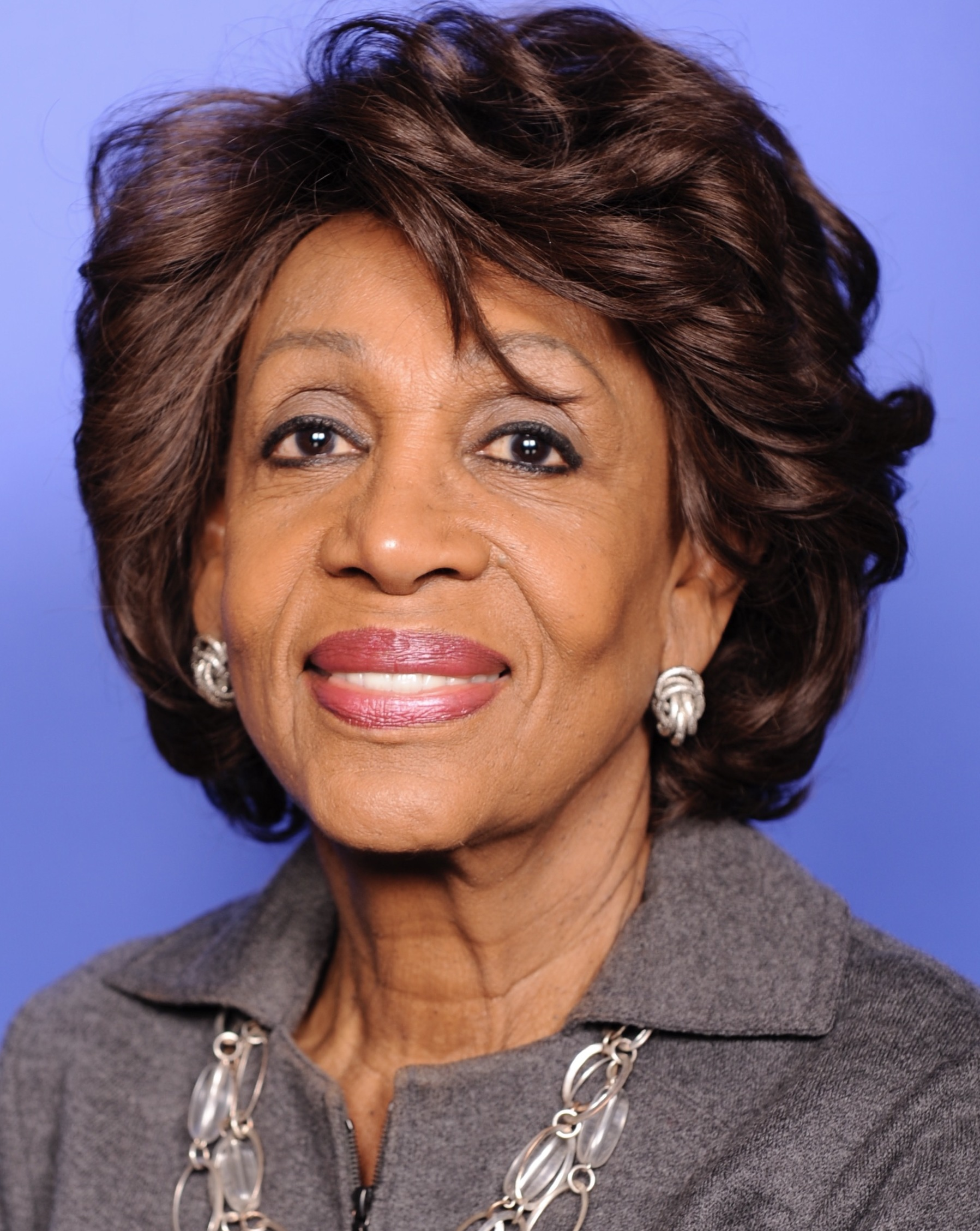

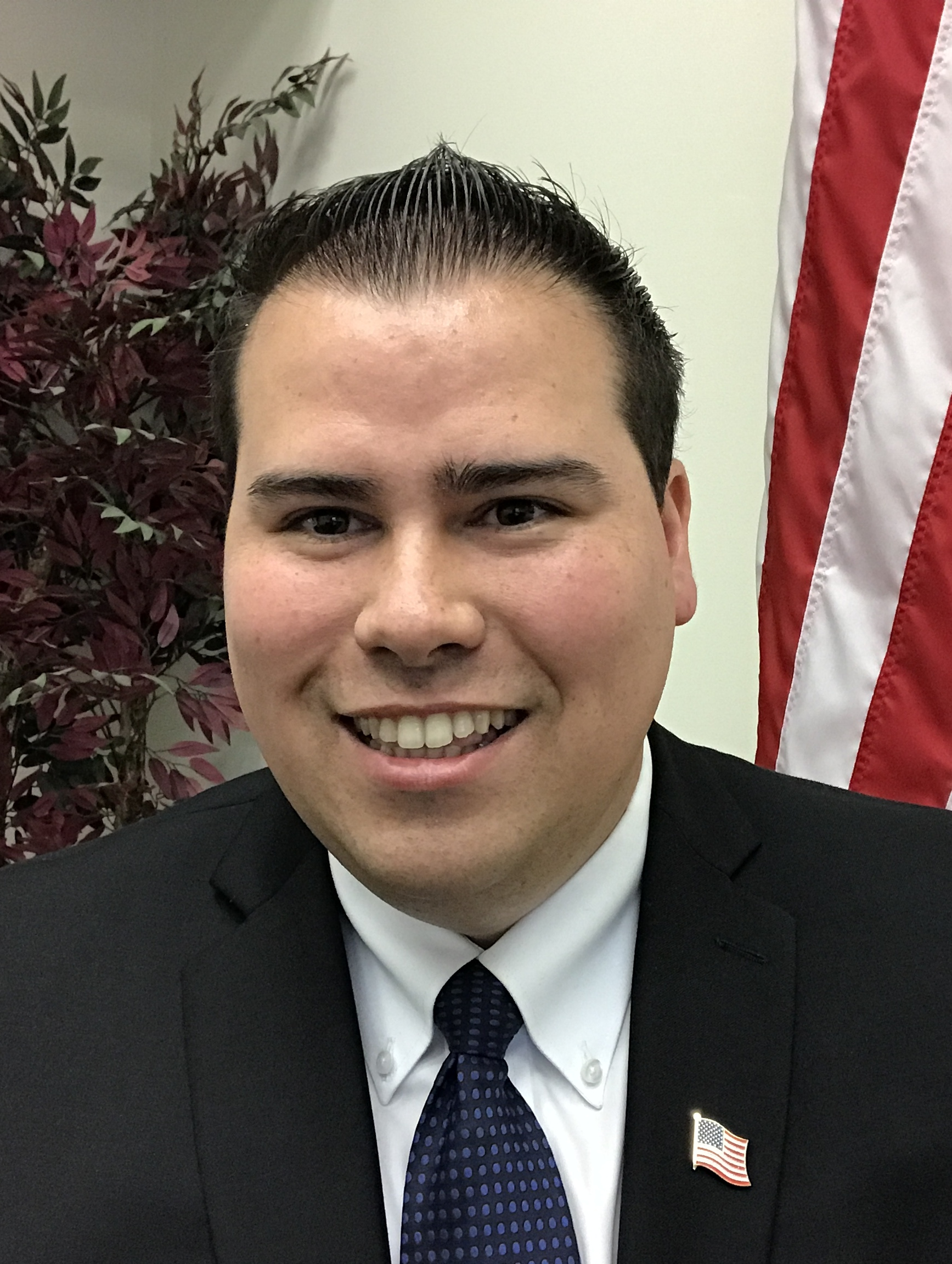
Candidate	Maxine Waters	Omar Navarro
Party	Democratic	Republican
Popular vote	95,462	27,985
Percentage	77.3%	22.7%
- Block group results Waters: 50–60% 60–70% 70–80% 80–90% 90–100% Navarro: 50–60% No results
U.S. Representative before election
Maxine Waters
Democratic
Elected U.S. Representative
Maxine Waters
Democratic

Democrat Maxine Waters, who had represented the district since 2013, was re-elected with 71.7% of the vote in 2020.

=== Candidates ===
==== Advanced to general ====
- Omar Navarro (Republican), small business owner, and perennial candidate
- Maxine Waters (Democratic), incumbent U.S. representative

==== Eliminated in primary ====
- Jean Monestime (Democratic), laborer
- Allison Pratt (Republican), youth advocate

=== Endorsements ===
Maxine Waters (D)

Organizations

- California Environmental Voters
- Feminist Majority PAC
- Planned Parenthood Action Fund
- Sierra Club

Labor unions

- SEIU California
- United Auto Workers

=== General election ===
==== Predictions ====
Source	Ranking	As of
The Cook Political Report	Solid D	December 21, 2021
Inside Elections	Solid D	December 28, 2021
Sabato's Crystal Ball	Safe D	January 4, 2022
Politico	Solid D	April 5, 2022
RCP	Safe D	June 9, 2022
Fox News	Solid D	July 11, 2022
DDHQ	Solid D	July 20, 2022
538	Solid D	June 30, 2022
The Economist	Safe D	September 7, 2022

=== Results ===
California's 43rd congressional district, 2022
Primary election
Party	Candidate	Votes	%
Democratic	Maxine Waters (incumbent)	55,889	74.3
Republican	Omar Navarro	8,927	11.9
Republican	Allison Pratt	5,489	7.3
Democratic	Jean Monestime	4,952	6.6
Total votes		75,257	100.0
General election
Democratic	Maxine Waters (incumbent)	95,462	77.3
Republican	Omar Navarro	27,985	22.7
Total votes		123,447	100.0
Democratic hold			

==== By county ====
County	Maxine Waters Democratic		Omar Navarro Republican		Margin		Total votes cast
County	#	%	#	%	#	%	Total votes cast
Los Angeles (part)	95,462	77.33%	27,985	22.67%	67,477	54.66%	123,447
Totals	95,462	77.33%	27,985	22.67%	67,477	54.66%	123,447

== District 44 ==
2022 California's 44th congressional district election
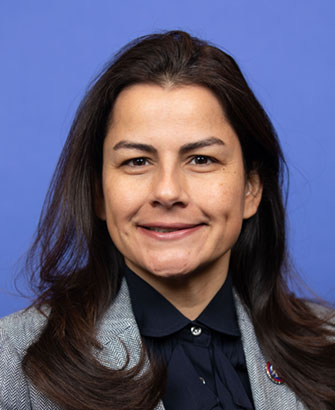

Candidate	Nanette Barragán	Paul Jones
Party	Democratic	Republican
Popular vote	100,160	38,554
Percentage	72.2%	27.8%
- Block group results Barragán: 50–60% 60–70% 70–80% 80–90% 90–100% Jones: 50–60% No results
U.S. Representative before election
Nanette Barragán
Democratic
Elected U.S. Representative
Nanette Barragán
Democratic

Democrat Nanette Barragán, who had represented the district since 2017, was re-elected with 67.8% of the vote in 2020.

=== Candidates ===
==== Advanced to general ====
- Nanette Barragán (Democratic), incumbent U.S. representative
- Paul Jones (Republican), minister

==== Eliminated in primary ====
- Morris Griffin (Democratic), maintenance technician

=== Endorsements ===
Nanette Barragán (D)

Organizations

- California Environmental Voters
- Feminist Majority PAC
- League of Conservation Voters
- Planned Parenthood Action Fund
- Sierra Club

Labor unions

- SEIU California
- United Auto Workers

=== General election ===
==== Predictions ====
Source	Ranking	As of
The Cook Political Report	Solid D	December 21, 2021
Inside Elections	Solid D	December 28, 2021
Sabato's Crystal Ball	Safe D	January 4, 2022
Politico	Solid D	April 5, 2022
RCP	Safe D	June 9, 2022
Fox News	Solid D	July 11, 2022
DDHQ	Solid D	July 20, 2022
538	Solid D	June 30, 2022
The Economist	Safe D	September 7, 2022

=== Results ===
California's 44th congressional district, 2022
Primary election
Party	Candidate	Votes	%
Democratic	Nanette Barragán (incumbent)	58,594	68.7
Republican	Paul Jones	20,569	24.1
Democratic	Morris Griffin	6,110	7.2
Total votes		85,273	100.0
General election
Democratic	Nanette Barragán (incumbent)	100,160	72.2
Republican	Paul Jones	38,554	27.8
Total votes		138,714	100.0
Democratic hold			

==== By county ====
County	Nanette Barragán Democratic		Paul Jones Republican		Margin		Total votes cast
County	#	%	#	%	#	%	Total votes cast
Los Angeles (part)	100,160	72.21%	38,554	27.79%	61,606	44.41%	138,714
Totals	100,160	72.21%	38,554	27.79%	61,606	44.41%	138,714

== District 45 ==
2022 California's 45th congressional district election
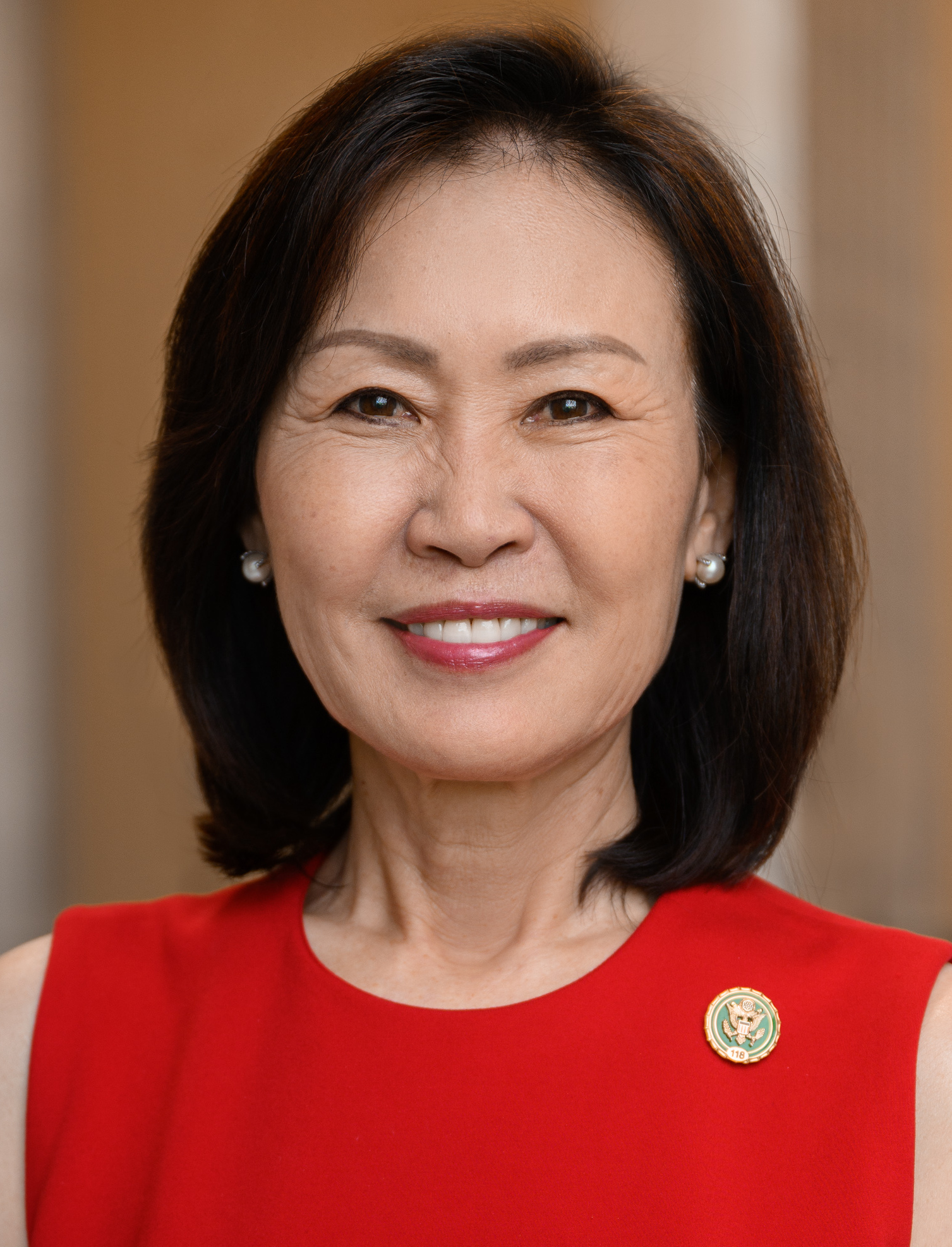

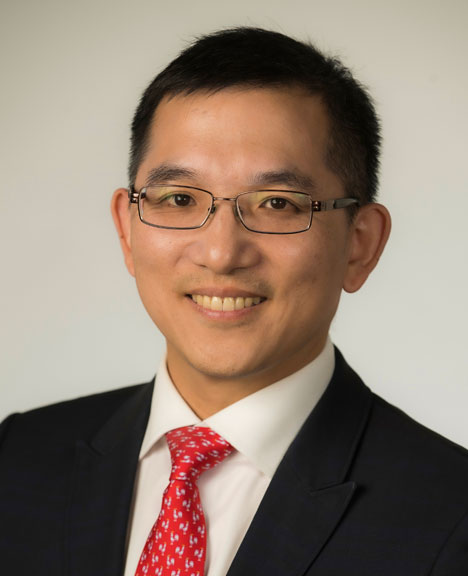
Candidate	Michelle Steel	Jay Chen
Party	Republican	Democratic
Popular vote	113,960	103,466
Percentage	52.4%	47.6%
- County results Steel: 50–60% Chen: 50–60%
U.S. Representative before election
Michelle Steel
Republican
Elected U.S. Representative
Michelle Steel
Republican

Due to redistricting, the incumbent changed from Democrat Katie Porter to Republican Michelle Steel. Steel, who had represented the 48th district since 2021, was elected with 51.1% of the vote in 2020. Steel was running for re-election.

=== Candidates ===
==== Advanced to general ====
- Jay Chen (Democratic), president of the board of trustees at Mt. San Antonio College, U.S. Navy veteran, and runner-up for the 39th district in 2012
- Michelle Steel (Republican), incumbent U.S. representative

==== Eliminated in primary ====
- Long Pham (Republican), nuclear engineer

=== Endorsements ===
Jay Chen (D)

U.S. senators

- Tammy Duckworth, U.S. senator from Illinois (2017–present)

U.S. representatives

- Ted Lieu, current U.S. representative from California's 33rd congressional district (2015–present)

Organizations

- ASPIRE PAC
- BOLD PAC
- Equality California
- Human Rights Campaign PAC
- New Democrat Coalition
- New Politics
- Planned Parenthood Action Fund
- Sierra Club
- Stonewall Democrats
- VoteVets.org

Labor unions

- SEIU California
- United Auto Workers
Michelle Steel (R)

Executive branch officials

- Nikki Haley, former U.S. Ambassador to the United Nations (2017–2019) and former governor of South Carolina (2011–2017)

U.S. senators

- Tim Scott, U.S. senator from South Carolina

U.S. representatives

- Ken Calvert, U.S. representative for California's 41st congressional district
- Young Kim, U.S. representative for California's 40th congressional district
- Kevin McCarthy, Minority Leader of the U.S. House of Representatives
- Mimi Walters, former U.S. representative for California's 45th congressional district

Local politicians

- Andrew Do, chair of the Orange County Board of Supervisors

Organizations

- Maggie's List
- Orange County Republican Party
- Pro-Israel America
- Republican Jewish Coalition

Newspapers

- The Orange County Register (post-primary)

=== General election ===
==== Predictions ====
Source	Ranking	As of
The Cook Political Report	Lean R	June 28, 2022
Inside Elections	Lean R	August 25, 2022
Sabato's Crystal Ball	Lean R	June 22, 2022
Politico	Lean R	October 3, 2022
RCP	Lean R	June 9, 2022
Fox News	Lean R	August 22, 2022
DDHQ	Lean R	July 20, 2022
538	Likely R	October 20, 2022
The Economist	Tossup	September 7, 2022

=== Results ===
California's 45th congressional district, 2022
Primary election
Party	Candidate	Votes	%
Republican	Michelle Steel (incumbent)	65,641	48.2
Democratic	Jay Chen	58,721	43.1
Republican	Long Pham	11,732	8.6
No party preference	Hilaire Fuji Shioura (write-in)	6	0.0
Total votes		136,100	100.0
General election
Republican	Michelle Steel (incumbent)	113,960	52.4
Democratic	Jay Chen	103,466	47.6
Total votes		217,426	100.0
Republican hold			

==== By county ====
County	Michelle Steel Republican		Jay Chen Democratic		Margin		Total votes cast
County	#	%	#	%	#	%	Total votes cast
Los Angeles (part)	9,598	42.25%	13,121	57.75%	-3,523	-15.51%	22,719
Orange (part)	104,362	53.60%	90,345	46.40%	14,017	7.20%	194,707
Totals	113,960	52.41%	103,466	47.59%	10,494	4.83%	217,426

== District 46 ==
2022 California's 46th congressional district election
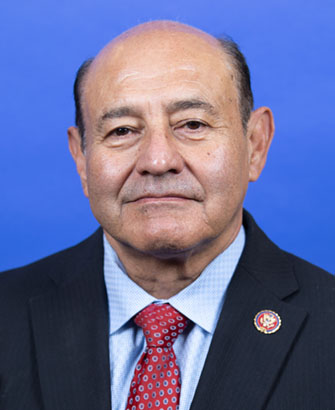

Candidate	Lou Correa	Christopher Gonzales
Party	Democratic	Republican
Popular vote	78,041	48,257
Percentage	61.8%	38.2%
- Block group results Correa: 50–60% 60–70% 70–80% 80–90% Gonzales: 50–60% 60–70% 90–100% No results
U.S. Representative before election
Lou Correa
Democratic
Elected U.S. Representative
Lou Correa
Democratic

Democrat Lou Correa, who had represented the district since 2017, was re-elected with 68.8% of the vote in 2020.

=== Candidates ===
==== Advanced to general ====
- Lou Correa (Democratic), incumbent U.S. representative
- Christopher Gonzales (Republican), attorney

==== Eliminated in primary ====
- Mike Nguyen (Republican), broker
- Michael Ortega (Democratic), engineer
- Felix Rocha (Republican), retired federal agent
- Ed Rushman (no party preference), IT project manager

=== Endorsements ===
Christopher Gonzales (R)

Organizations

- The American Council
- California ProLife Council
- California Republican Party
- Crime Victims United
- Freedom Revival
- Hispanic 100
- Republican Party of Orange County
Lou Correa (D)

Organizations

- California Environmental Voters
- Planned Parenthood Action Fund
- Pro-Israel America
- Sierra Club

Labor unions

- SEIU California
- United Farm Workers
Michael Ortega (D)

Organizations

- Americans for Democratic Action Southern California
- Center for Biological Diversity Action Fund
- Democratic Socialists of America Orange County
- Our Revolution Orange County
- Progressive Democrats of America

Individuals

- Marianne Williamson, author and candidate for president of the United States in 2020

=== General election ===
==== Predictions ====
Source	Ranking	As of
The Cook Political Report	Solid D	December 21, 2021
Inside Elections	Solid D	December 28, 2021
Sabato's Crystal Ball	Safe D	January 4, 2022
Politico	Solid D	April 5, 2022
RCP	Safe D	June 9, 2022
Fox News	Solid D	July 11, 2022
DDHQ	Solid D	July 20, 2022
538	Solid D	June 30, 2022
The Economist	Safe D	September 7, 2022

=== Results ===
California's 46th congressional district, 2022
Primary election
Party	Candidate	Votes	%
Democratic	Lou Correa (incumbent)	37,311	49.1
Republican	Christopher Gonzales	11,823	15.6
Democratic	Michael Ortega	9,311	12.3
Republican	Mike Nguyen	9,162	12.1
Republican	Felix Rocha	7,084	9.3
No party preference	Ed Rushman	1,264	1.7
Total votes		75,955	100.0
General election
Democratic	Lou Correa (incumbent)	78,041	61.8
Republican	Christopher Gonzales	48,257	38.2
Total votes		126,298	100.0
Democratic hold			

==== By county ====
County	Lou Correa Democratic		Christopher Gonzales Republican		Margin		Total votes cast
County	#	%	#	%	#	%	Total votes cast
Orange (part)	78,041	61.79%	48,257	38.21%	29,784	23.58%	126,298
Totals	78,041	61.79%	48,257	38.21%	29,784	23.58%	126,298

== District 47 ==
2022 California's 47th congressional district election
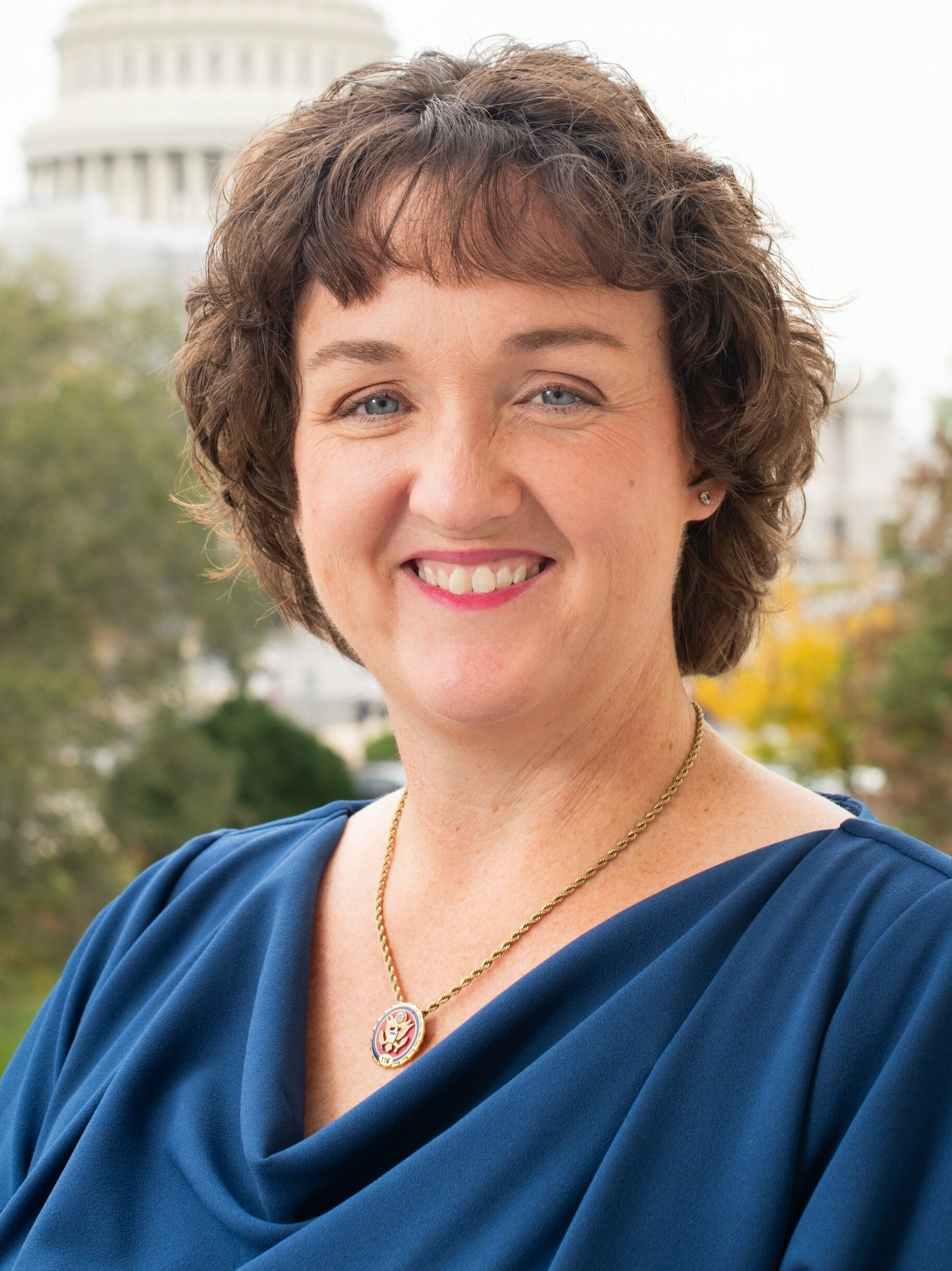

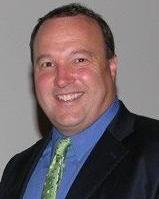
Candidate	Katie Porter	Scott Baugh
Party	Democratic	Republican
Popular vote	137,374	128,261
Percentage	51.7%	48.3%
- Block group results Porter: 50–60% 60–70% 70–80% 80–90% 90–100% Baugh: 50–60% 60–70% 70–80% No results
U.S. Representative before election
Katie Porter
Democratic
Elected U.S. Representative
Katie Porter
Democratic

Due to redistricting, the incumbent changed from Democrat Alan Lowenthal to fellow Democrat Katie Porter. Porter, who had represented the 45th district since 2019, was re-elected with 53.5% of the vote in 2020.

=== Candidates ===
==== Advanced to general ====
- Scott Baugh (Republican), former state assemblyman, former chair of the Orange County Republican Party, and candidate for the 48th district in 2018
- Katie Porter (Democratic), incumbent U.S. representative

==== Eliminated in primary ====
- Brian Burley (Republican), IT analyst and candidate for the 48th district in 2020
- Amy Phan West (Republican), former member of the Orange County Parks Commission and perennial candidate
- Errol Webber (Republican), filmmaker and runner-up for the 37th district in 2020

==== Withdrew ====
- Harley Rouda (Democratic), former U.S. representative

=== Endorsements ===
Scott Baugh (R)

Organizations

- Club for Growth PAC
- Tea Party Express

Newspapers

- The Orange County Register
Errol Weber (R)

Individuals

- Michael Flynn, U.S. Army general and former national security advisor
Katie Porter (D)

Organizations

- Brand New Congress
- California Environmental Voters
- Democracy for America
- EMILY's List
- End Citizens United
- Equality California
- Feminist Majority PAC
- Giffords
- League of Conservation Voters
- NARAL Pro-Choice America
- National Iranian American Council
- Natural Resources Defense Council
- Planned Parenthood Action Fund
- Progressive Democrats of America
- Sierra Club
- Stonewall Democrats

Labor unions

- National Education Association
- National Nurses United
- United Auto Workers

=== General election ===
==== Predictions ====
Source	Ranking	As of
The Cook Political Report	Tossup	November 1, 2022
Inside Elections	Tilt D	November 3, 2022
Sabato's Crystal Ball	Lean D	January 4, 2022
Politico	Lean D	April 5, 2022
RCP	Tossup	June 9, 2022
Fox News	Tossup	November 1, 2022
DDHQ	Likely D	October 17, 2022
538	Likely D	July 11, 2022
The Economist	Likely D	September 28, 2022

=== Results ===
California's 47th congressional district, 2022
Primary election
Party	Candidate	Votes	%
Democratic	Katie Porter (incumbent)	86,742	51.7
Republican	Scott Baugh	51,776	30.9
Republican	Amy Phan West	13,949	8.3
Republican	Brian Burley	11,952	7.1
Republican	Errol Webber	3,342	2.0
Total votes		167,761	100.0
General election
Democratic	Katie Porter (incumbent)	137,374	51.7
Republican	Scott Baugh	128,261	48.3
Total votes		265,635	100.0
Democratic hold			

==== By county ====
County	Katie Porter Democratic		Scott Baugh Republican		Margin		Total votes cast
County	#	%	#	%	#	%	Total votes cast
Orange (part)	137,374	51.72%	128,261	48.28%	9,113	3.43%	256,635
Totals	137,374	51.72%	128,261	48.28%	9,113	3.43%	256,635

== District 48 ==
2022 California's 48th congressional district election
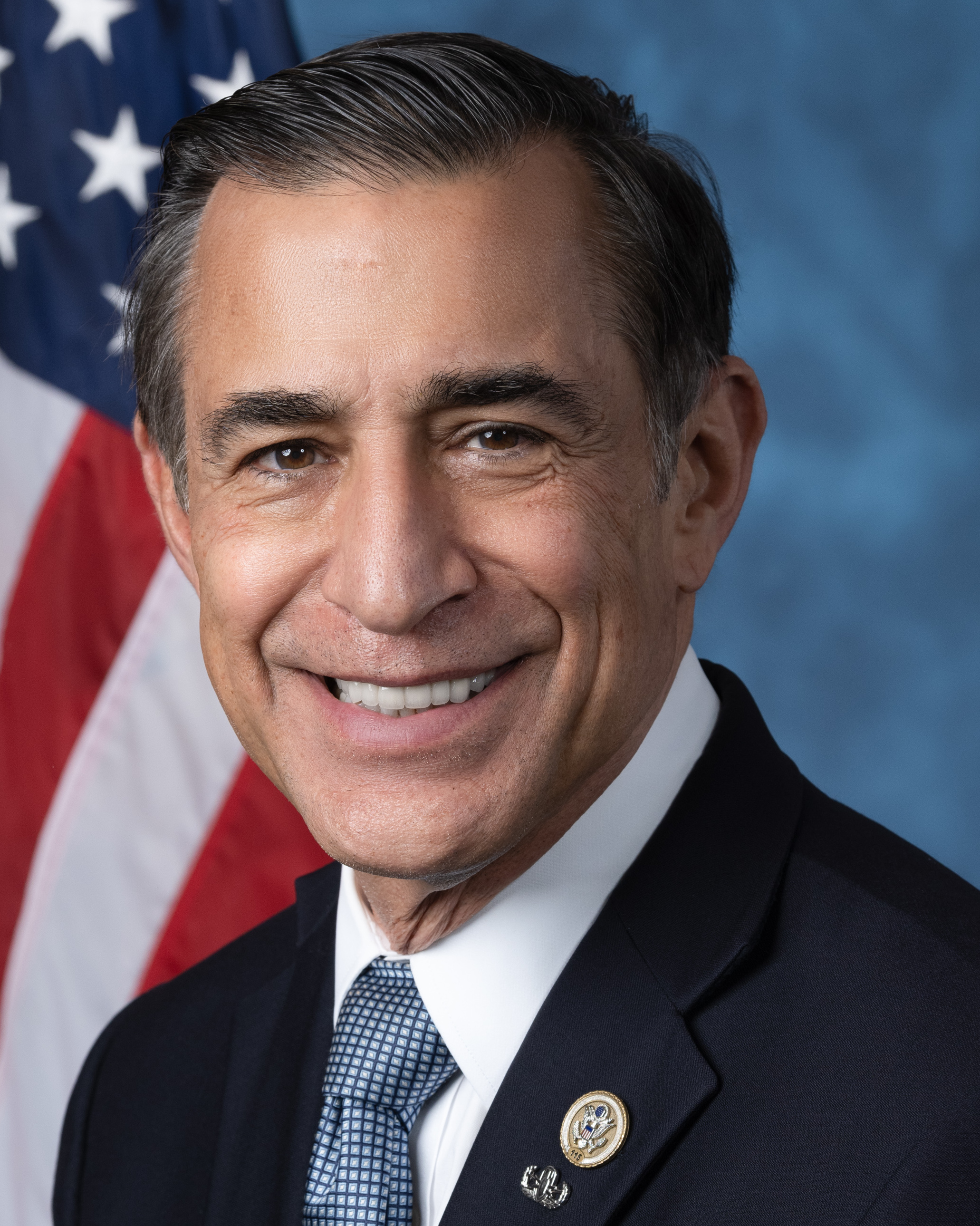

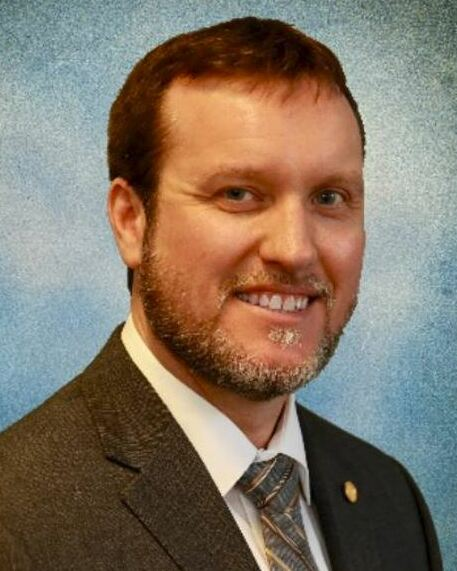
Candidate	Darrell Issa	Stephen Houlahan
Party	Republican	Democratic
Popular vote	155,171	101,900
Percentage	60.4%	39.6%
- Issa: 50–60% 60–70% 70–80% 80–90% 90–100% Houlahan: 50–60% 60–70% 90–100% Tie: 50% No results
U.S. Representative before election
Darrell Issa
Republican
Elected U.S. Representative
Darrell Issa
Republican

Due to redistricting, the incumbent changed from Republican Michelle Steel to fellow Republican Darrell Issa, who had represented the 50th district since 2021, and was elected with 54.0% of the vote in 2020.

=== Candidates ===
==== Advanced to general ====
- Stephen Houlahan (Democratic), registered nurse and former Santee city councilor
- Darrell Issa (Republican), incumbent U.S. representative and technology entrepreneur

==== Eliminated in primary ====
- Lucinda KWH Jahn (no party preference), entertainment industry technician
- Matthew G. Rascon (Democratic), community volunteer

==== Withdrawn ====
- Mari Barosay (Democratic), urgent care nurse
- Timothy Bilash (Democratic), physician
- Joseph Rocha (Democratic), attorney and U.S. Marine Corps veteran (running for State Senate)

=== Endorsements ===
Stephen Houlahan (D)

Newspapers

- The San Diego Union-Tribune
Darrell Issa (R)

Federal officials

- Donald Trump, former president of the United States
Joseph C. Rocha (D) (withdrawn)

U.S. representatives

- David Cicilline, U.S. representative from RI-01 (2011–present)
- Mark Takano, U.S. representative for CA-41 (2013–present)

State legislators

- Christine Kehoe, former state senator (2004–2012)

=== General election ===
==== Predictions ====
Source	Ranking	As of
The Cook Political Report	Solid R	December 21, 2021
Inside Elections	Solid R	December 28, 2021
Sabato's Crystal Ball	Safe R	January 4, 2022
Politico	Solid R	April 5, 2022
RCP	Safe R	June 9, 2022
Fox News	Solid R	July 11, 2022
DDHQ	Solid R	July 20, 2022
538	Solid R	June 30, 2022
The Economist	Safe R	September 7, 2022

=== Results ===
California's 48th congressional district, 2022
Primary election
Party	Candidate	Votes	%
Republican	Darrell Issa (incumbent)	101,280	61.5
Democratic	Stephen Houlahan	45,740	27.8
Democratic	Matthew Rascon	14,983	9.1
No party preference	Lucinda Jahn	2,614	1.6
Total votes		164,617	100.0
General election
Republican	Darrell Issa (incumbent)	155,171	60.4
Democratic	Stephen Houlahan	101,900	39.6
Total votes		257,071	100.0
Republican hold			

==== By county ====
County	Darrell Issa Republican		Stephen Houlahan Democratic		Margin		Total votes cast
County	#	%	#	%	#	%	Total votes cast
Riverside (part)	48,809	61.20%	30,948	38.80%	17,861	22.39%	79,757
San Diego (part)	106,362	59.99%	70,952	40.01%	35,410	19.97%	177,314
Totals	155,171	60.36%	101,900	39.64%	53,271	20.72%	257,071

== District 49 ==
2022 California's 49th congressional district election
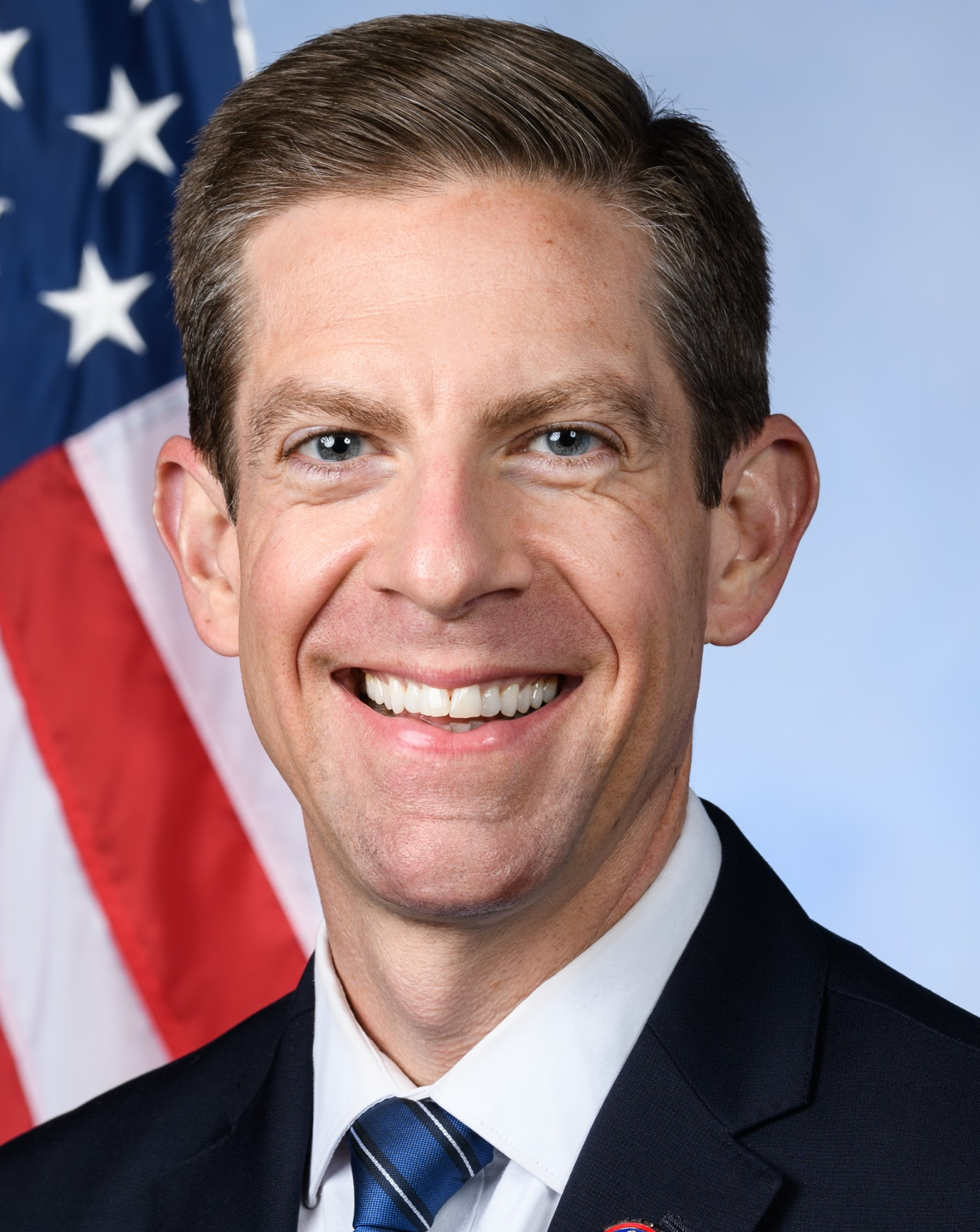

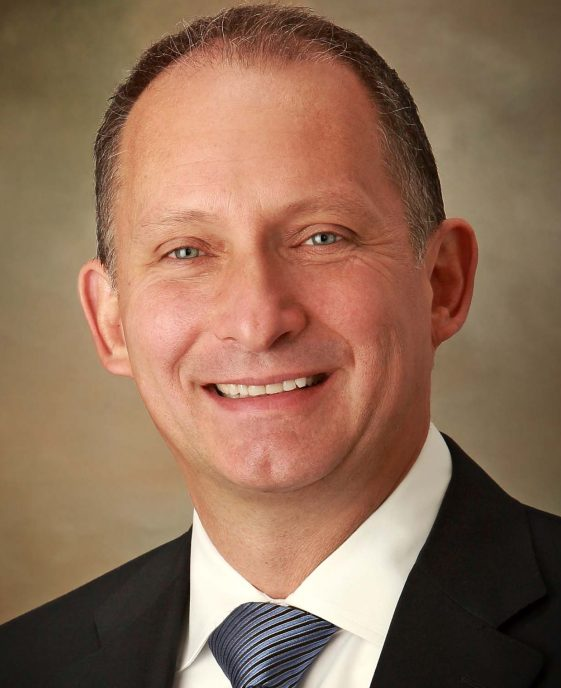
Candidate	Mike Levin	Brian Maryott
Party	Democratic	Republican
Popular vote	153,541	138,194
Percentage	52.6%	47.4%
- Levin: 50–60% 60–70% 70–80% Mayrott: 50–60% 60–70%
U.S. Representative before election
Mike Levin
Democratic
Elected U.S. Representative
Mike Levin
Democratic

Democrat Mike Levin, who had represented the district since 2019, was re-elected with 53.1% of the vote in 2020. Levin was running for re-election.

=== Candidates ===
==== Advanced to general ====
- Mike Levin (Democratic), incumbent U.S. representative
- Brian Maryott (Republican), former mayor of San Juan Capistrano, candidate for this district in 2018, and runner-up in 2020

==== Eliminated in primary ====
- Lisa Bartlett (Republican), Orange County supervisor
- Josiah O'Neil (Republican), sheriff's deputy
- Christopher Rodriguez (Republican), Oceanside city councilor
- Nadia Smalley (Democratic), private nurse
- Renee Taylor (Republican), cybersecurity manager

==== Withdrew ====
- Anne Elizabeth (Republican), talk show host

=== Endorsements ===
Mike Levin (D)

Federal officials

- Joe Biden, president of the United States

Organizations

- American Israel Public Affairs Committee
- California Environmental Voters
- Council for a Livable World
- Democracy for America
- End Citizens United
- Equality California
- Feminist Majority PAC
- Giffords
- League of Conservation Voters
- NARAL Pro-Choice America
- Natural Resources Defense Council
- Planned Parenthood Action Fund
- Pro-Israel America
- Sierra Club
- Stonewall Democrats

Newspapers

- The San Diego Union-Tribune

Labor unions

- National Education Association
- SEIU California
- United Auto Workers
- United Farm Workers
Brian Maryott (R)

State legislators

- Brian Jones, member of the California State Senate from the 38th district
- Marie Waldron, minority leader of the California State Senate

Organizations

- Orange County Republican Party
Lisa Bartlett (R)

Individuals

- Larry Elder, radio host and candidate in the 2021 California gubernatorial recall election

=== Polling ===
Poll source	Date(s) administered	Sample size	Margin of error	Lisa Bartlett (R)	Brian Maryott (R)	Mike Levin (D)	Josiah O'Neil (R)	Christopher Rodriguez (R)	Nadia Smalley (D)	Renee Taylor (R)	Undecided
co/efficient (R) (Note: This poll was sponsored by Rodriguez's campaign.)	May 12, 2022	– (LV)	–	9%	9%	42%	4%	13%	2%	1%	21%

=== General election ===
==== Predictions ====
Source	Ranking	As of
The Cook Political Report	Tossup	October 25, 2022
Inside Elections	Tilt D	November 3, 2022
Sabato's Crystal Ball	Lean R (flip)	November 7, 2022
Politico	Tossup	October 26, 2022
RCP	Tossup	June 9, 2022
Fox News	Tossup	October 18, 2022
DDHQ	Likely D	July 20, 2022
538	Likely D	June 30, 2022
The Economist	Lean D	October 4, 2022

==== Polling ====
Poll source	Date(s) administered	Sample size	Margin of error	Mike Levin (D)	Brian Maryott (R)	Undecided
SurveyUSA	October 27–31, 2022	568 (LV)	± 5.0%	49%	43%	8%

Hypothetical polling

Generic Democrat vs. generic Republican

Poll source	Date(s) administered	Sample size	Margin of error	Generic Democrat	Generic Republican	Undecided
co/efficient (R)	May 12, 2022	– (LV)	–	48%	45%	7%

=== Results ===
California's 49th congressional district, 2022
Primary election
Party	Candidate	Votes	%
Democratic	Mike Levin (incumbent)	92,211	48.9
Republican	Brian Maryott	35,805	19.0
Republican	Lisa Bartlett	20,163	10.7
Republican	Christopher Rodriguez	18,248	9.7
Republican	Josiah O'Neil	14,746	7.8
Democratic	Nadia Smalley	4,804	2.5
Republican	Renee Taylor	2,597	1.4
Total votes		188,574	100.0
General election
Democratic	Mike Levin (incumbent)	153,541	52.6
Republican	Brian Maryott	138,194	47.4
Total votes		291,735	100.0
Democratic hold			

==== By county ====
County	Mike Levin Democratic		Brian Maryott Republican		Margin		Total votes cast
County	#	%	#	%	#	%	Total votes cast
Orange (part)	46,807	45.04%	57,114	54.96%	−10,307	−9.92%	103,921
San Diego (part)	106,734	56.83%	81,080	43.17%	25,654	13.66%	187,814
Totals	153,541	52.63%	138,194	47.37%	15,347	5.26%	291,735

== District 50 ==
2022 California's 50th congressional district election
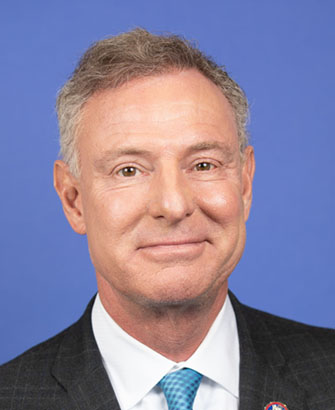

Candidate	Scott Peters	Corey Gustafson
Party	Democratic	Republican
Popular vote	168,816	99,819
Percentage	62.8%	37.2%
- Block group results Peters: 50–60% 60–70% 70–80% 80–90% 90–100% Gustafson: 50–60% 60–70% 70–80%
U.S. Representative before election
Scott Peters
Democratic
Elected U.S. Representative
Scott Peters
Democratic

Due to redistricting, the incumbent changed from Republican Darrell Issa to Democrat Scott Peters. Peters, who had represented the 52nd district since 2013, was re-elected with 61.6% of the vote in 2020.

=== Candidates ===
==== Advanced to general ====
- Corey Gustafson (Republican), educator
- Scott Peters (Democratic), incumbent U.S. representative

==== Eliminated in primary ====
- David Chiddick (Republican), coffee shop owner and U.S. Navy veteran
- Adam Schindler (no party preference), medical researcher and technical writer
- Kylie Taitano (Democratic), software engineer and tech non-profit CEO

=== Endorsements ===
Scott Peters (D)

Organizations

- League of Conservation Voters Action Fund
- Planned Parenthood Action Fund

Labor unions

- United Auto Workers

Newspapers

- The San Diego Union-Tribune
Kylie Taitano (D)

Organizations

- Progressive Democrats of America
- Sunrise Movement San Diego

=== General election ===
==== Predictions ====
Source	Ranking	As of
The Cook Political Report	Solid D	December 21, 2021
Inside Elections	Solid D	December 28, 2021
Sabato's Crystal Ball	Safe D	January 4, 2022
Politico	Solid D	April 5, 2022
RCP	Safe D	June 9, 2022
Fox News	Solid D	July 11, 2022
DDHQ	Solid D	July 20, 2022
538	Solid D	June 30, 2022
The Economist	Safe D	September 7, 2022

=== Results ===
California's 50th congressional district, 2022
Primary election
Party	Candidate	Votes	%
Democratic	Scott Peters (incumbent)	89,894	52.3
Republican	Corey Gustafson	51,312	29.9
Democratic	Kylie Taitano	16,065	9.4
Republican	David Chiddick	9,333	5.4
No party preference	Adam Schindler	5,168	3.0
Total votes		171,772	100.0
General election
Democratic	Scott Peters (incumbent)	168,816	62.8
Republican	Corey Gustafson	99,819	37.2
Total votes		268,635	100.0
Democratic hold			

==== By county ====
County	Scott Peters Democratic		Corey Gustafson Republican		Margin		Total votes cast
County	#	%	#	%	#	%	Total votes cast
San Diego (part)	168,816	62.84%	99,819	37.16%	68,997	25.68%	268,635
Totals	168,816	62.84%	99,819	37.16%	68,997	25.68%	268,635

== District 51 ==
2022 California's 51st congressional district election
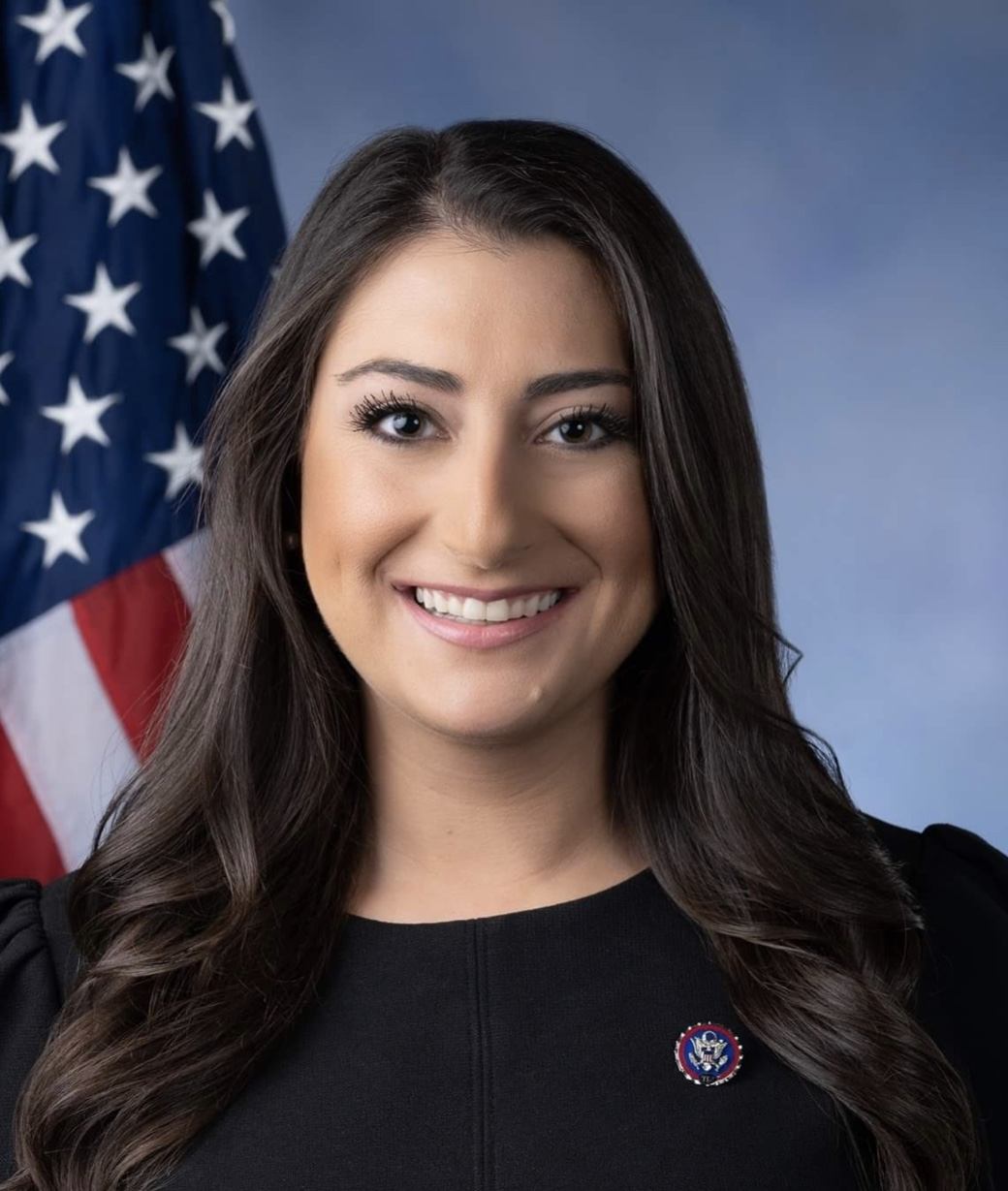

Candidate	Sara Jacobs	Stan Caplan
Party	Democratic	Republican
Popular vote	144,186	88,886
Percentage	61.9%	38.1%
- Block group results Jacobs: 50–60% 60–70% 70–80% 80–90% 90–100% Caplan: 50–60% 60–70% 90–100% Tie: 50% No results
U.S. Representative before election
Sara Jacobs
Democratic
Elected U.S. Representative
Sara Jacobs
Democratic

Due to redistricting, the incumbent changed from Democrat Juan Vargas to fellow Democrat Sara Jacobs. Jacobs, who had represented the 53rd district since 2021, was elected with 59.5% of the vote in 2020.

=== Candidates ===
==== Advanced to general ====
- Stan Caplan (Republican), small business owner
- Sara Jacobs (Democratic), incumbent U.S. representative

==== Eliminated in primary ====
- Jose Cortes (Peace and Freedom), customer service representative
- Barrett Holman Leak (Democratic) (write-in)

=== Endorsements ===
Sara Jacobs (D)

Organizations

- American Postal Workers Union
- California Environmental Voters
- Planned Parenthood Action Fund
- Sierra Club
- United Auto Workers

Newspapers

- The San Diego Union-Tribune
Jose Cortes (PF)

Organizations

- Party for Socialism and Liberation
Stan Caplan (R)

Individuals

- Richard Bailey, mayor of Coronado
- Darrell Issa, US House representative from California
- Bill Wells, mayor of El Cajon

Organizations

- Deputy Sheriffs' Association of San Diego County

=== General election ===
==== Predictions ====
Source	Ranking	As of
The Cook Political Report	Solid D	December 21, 2021
Inside Elections	Solid D	December 28, 2021
Sabato's Crystal Ball	Safe D	January 4, 2022
Politico	Solid D	April 5, 2022
RCP	Safe D	June 9, 2022
Fox News	Solid D	July 11, 2022
DDHQ	Solid D	July 20, 2022
538	Solid D	June 30, 2022
The Economist	Safe D	September 7, 2022

=== Results ===
California's 51st congressional district, 2022
Primary election
Party	Candidate	Votes	%
Democratic	Sara Jacobs (incumbent)	91,329	60.5
Republican	Stan Caplan	56,183	37.2
Peace and Freedom	Jose Cortes	3,343	2.2
Democratic	Barrett Holman Leak (write-in)	55	0.0
Total votes		150,910	100.0
General election
Democratic	Sara Jacobs (incumbent)	144,186	61.9
Republican	Stan Caplan	88,886	38.1
Total votes		233,072	100.0
Democratic hold			

==== By county ====
County	Sara Jacobs Democratic		Stan Caplan Republican		Margin		Total votes cast
County	#	%	#	%	#	%	Total votes cast
San Diego (part)	144,186	61.86%	88,886	38.14%	55,300	23.73%	233,072
Totals	144,186	61.86%	88,886	38.14%	55,300	23.73%	233,072

== District 52 ==
2022 California's 52nd congressional district election
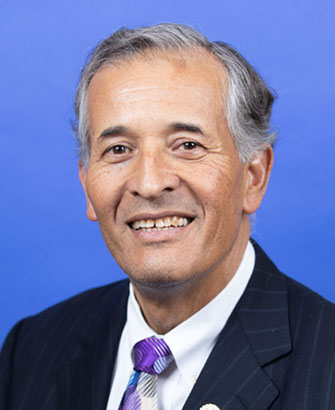

Candidate	Juan Vargas	Tyler Geffeney
Party	Democratic	Republican
Popular vote	100,686	50,330
Percentage	66.7%	33.3%
- Block group results Vargas: 50–60% 60–70% 70–80% 80–90% Geffeney: 50–60% No results
U.S. Representative before election
Juan Vargas
Democratic
Elected U.S. Representative
Juan Vargas
Democratic

Due to redistricting, the incumbent changed from Democrat Scott Peters to fellow Democrat Juan Vargas. Vargas, who had represented the 51st district since 2013, was re-elected with 68.3% of the vote in 2020.

=== Candidates ===
==== Advanced to general ====
- Tyler Geffeney (Republican), minister
- Juan Vargas (Democratic), incumbent U.S. representative

==== Eliminated in primary ====
- Joaquín Vázquez (Democratic), community organizer and candidate for the 53rd district in 2020

=== Endorsements ===
Juan Vargas (D)

Organizations

- California Environmental Voters
- Planned Parenthood Action Fund
- Pro-Israel America
- Sierra Club

Labor unions

- United Auto Workers

Newspapers

- The San Diego Union-Tribune
Joaquín Vázquez (D)

Individuals

- Marianne Williamson, author and candidate for president of the United States in 2020

=== General election ===
==== Predictions ====
Source	Ranking	As of
The Cook Political Report	Solid D	December 21, 2021
Inside Elections	Solid D	December 28, 2021
Sabato's Crystal Ball	Safe D	January 4, 2022
Politico	Solid D	April 5, 2022
RCP	Safe D	June 9, 2022
Fox News	Solid D	July 11, 2022
DDHQ	Solid D	July 20, 2022
538	Solid D	June 30, 2022
The Economist	Safe D	September 7, 2022

=== Results ===
California's 52nd congressional district, 2022
Primary election
Party	Candidate	Votes	%
Democratic	Juan Vargas (incumbent)	56,827	59.1
Republican	Tyler Geffeney	29,348	30.5
Democratic	Joaquín Vázquez	9,965	10.4
Total votes		96,140	100.0
General election
Democratic	Juan Vargas (incumbent)	100,686	66.7
Republican	Tyler Geffeney	50,330	33.3
Total votes		151,016	100.0
Democratic hold			

==== By county ====
County	Juan Vargas Democratic		Tyler Geffeney Republican		Margin		Total votes cast
County	#	%	#	%	#	%	Total votes cast
San Diego (part)	100,686	66.67%	50,330	33.33%	50,356	33.34%	151,016
Totals	100,686	66.67%	50,330	33.33%	50,356	33.34%	151,016

== Notes ==
Partisan clients
