= Harley Rouda =

American attorney & politician (born 1961)

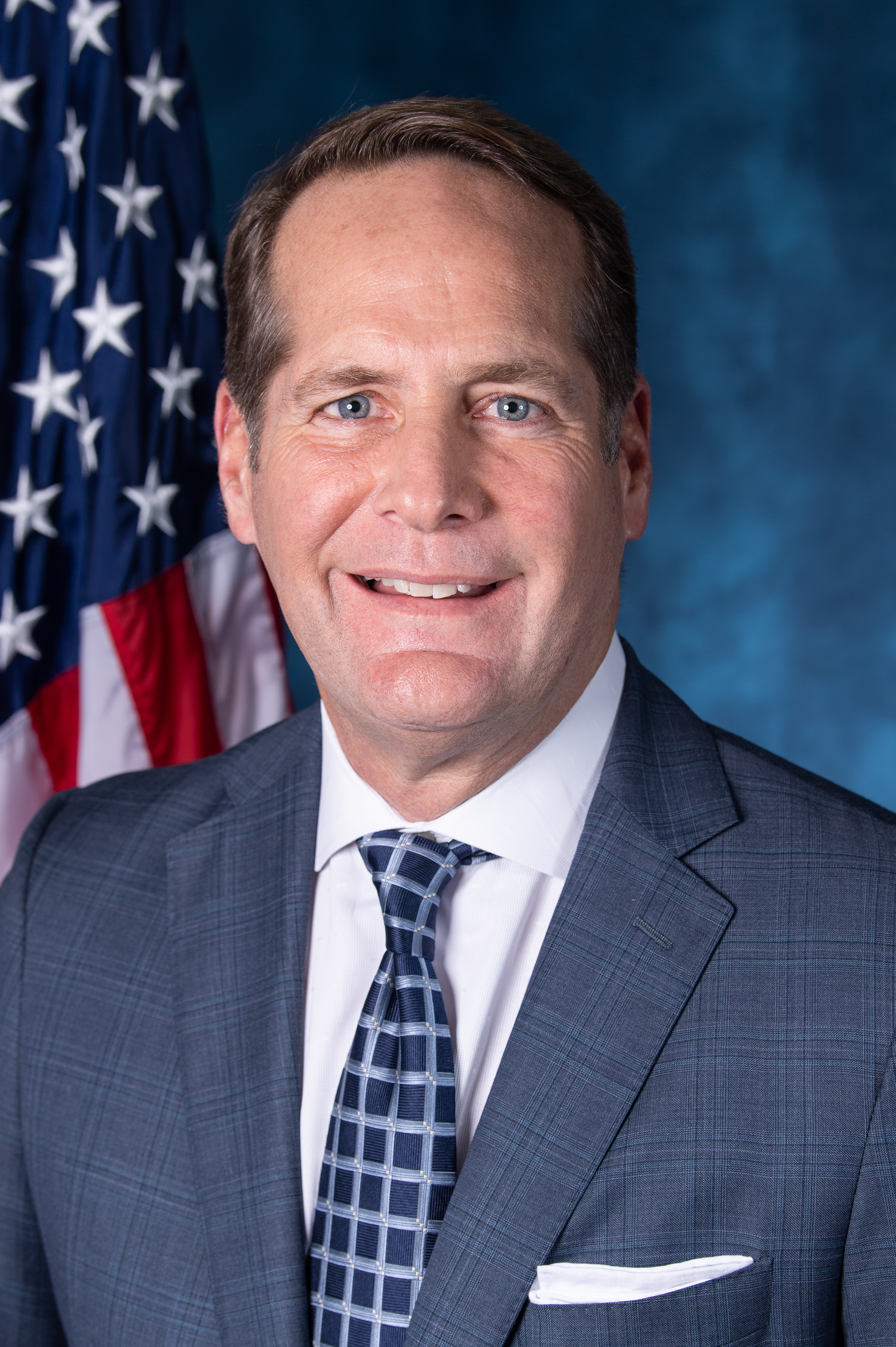

Member of the U.S. House of Representatives from California's 48th district
- In office January 3, 2019 – January 3, 2021
- Preceded by: Dana Rohrabacher
- Succeeded by: Michelle Steel

Personal details
- Born: Harley Edwin Rouda Jr. December 10, 1961 (age 64) Columbus, Ohio, U.S.
- Party: Republican (before 1997); Independent (1997–2017); Democratic (2017–present)
- Spouse: Kaira Sturdivant (m. 1990)
- Children: 4
- Education: University of Kentucky (BA); Capital University (JD); Ohio State University (MBA)

Harley Edwin Rouda Jr. (born December 10, 1961) is an American attorney, businessman and politician who served as the U.S. representative for California's 48th congressional district from 2019 to 2021. He was the first Democrat to represent the district, which encompasses southwestern coastal portions of Orange County including the cities of Huntington Beach, Costa Mesa and Newport Beach. He was defeated for reelection by Orange County Supervisor Michelle Steel in 2020.

Rouda first ran for office in the 2018 election, when he defeated 15-term Republican incumbent Dana Rohrabacher. Following his departure in 2020, Rouda considered running for Congress in the 2022 elections, but later announced he would not seek any public office that cycle.

On January 11, 2023, Rouda announced his candidacy for California's 47th congressional district, the House seat to be vacated by incumbent Katie Porter. Three months later Rouda announced he was ending his campaign, citing health concerns.

== Early life and education ==
Rouda was born December 10, 1961, in Columbus, Ohio, the son of Marlese Rouda and the late Harley Edwin Rouda. He was raised in Upper Arlington and graduated from Upper Arlington High School.

Rouda received his Bachelor of Science from the University of Kentucky in 1984, where he was a member of Delta Tau Delta social fraternity. He also earned a Juris Doctor from Capital University Law School in 1986, and Master of Business Administration from Ohio State University in 2002.

== Career ==
Following passage of the Ohio bar examination, Rouda worked at the law firm of Porter Wright Morris & Arthur LLP in Columbus, Ohio until 1990. He later left the firm to join his family business, HER Realtors, and eventually served as CEO of Trident Holdings, the parent company of HER Realtors.

=== Early political career ===
Rouda says he was raised in a "traditional Republican household." He was a registered Republican until 1997, when he left the party and became an independent because he felt the Republican Party had been moving in the "wrong direction" on social issues. Rouda says the last Republican he voted for was Bob Dole in the 1996 presidential election. He switched his party affiliation to the Democratic Party after the 2016 election. Shortly before registering as a Democrat, Rouda donated to the John Kasich 2016 presidential campaign. Kasich would suspend his campaign shortly before he was defeated by Donald Trump in the California primary. Due to these donations, he was criticized by Democrats as insufficiently loyal to the party or being a "Republican in disguise" during the campaign, to which Rouda responded, “we gave … because they are personal friends – not because he is someone who I share a political ideology with – and because I wanted to stop Donald Trump and his divisive campaign.”

== U.S. House of Representatives ==
=== Elections ===
==== 2018 ====
On March 2, 2017, Rouda announced his candidacy for U.S. Representative from California's 48th congressional district, challenging the incumbent, Dana Rohrabacher, shortly after changing his party registration from no party preference to Democratic. His primary opponent, Hans Keirstead, was endorsed by the Democratic Party of California at the party convention. Rouda received the Democratic Congressional Campaign Committee endorsement in May 2018. In the nonpartisan blanket primary election, Rouda secured the second spot over Keirstead on the ballot by 125 votes (from a total of 174,024), thus allowing him to face Rohrabacher in the general election.

On October 25, Michael Bloomberg announced he would be supporting Rouda's campaign by donating $4 million to his PAC, Independence USA. That made Rouda's race against Rohrabacher the most expensive House race in the 2018 election cycle.

On November 6, the election was too close to call, as Rouda held a narrow lead over Rohrabacher. As mail-in votes were counted, Rouda's lead expanded, and the Associated Press called the race in his favor on November 10.

==== 2020 ====
Rouda ran for reelection and faced off against the Republican challenger, Orange County supervisor Michelle Steel, during the general election on November 3, 2020. Steel ultimately defeated Rouda, garnering 51.1% of the vote to Rouda's 48.9%. Immediately after his loss, Rouda announced he would run against Steel again in 2022.

Rouda missed federally mandated deadlines for reporting that his wife traded stocks while he was in office. The missed reporting appeared to violate the STOCK Act, which is designed to combat insider trading.

==== 2022 ====
After conceding the election, Rouda had announced that he would challenge Steel in 2022. However, new congressional maps going into effect for the 2022 cycle placed the homes of Rouda, Steel and two-term Democratic Representative Katie Porter in the same district, now numbered the 47th district. When Porter announced her intention to run in the 47th district, Steel chose to run in the new 45th district.

After initially announcing his intent to challenge Porter, Rouda dropped out of the race in January 2022. Rouda formed a political action committee, Join Together PAC, to support the election of moderate Democrats, such as Katrina Foley of the Orange County Board of Supervisors.

==== 2024 ====
After incumbent representative Katie Porter announced that she would not be running reelection to the House in the 47th district, instead opting to run in the 2024 United States Senate election in California, Rouda announced that he would run for the seat in the 2024 elections. However, on April 11, 2023, Rouda announced his withdrawal from the race, citing a traumatic brain injury he received following a fall. He then endorsed activist Joanna Weiss and called for California state senator Dave Min to drop out of the race due to his DUI.

=== Committee assignments ===
- Committee on Oversight and Reform
  - Subcommittee on Environment (chair)
  - Subcommittee on National Security
- Committee on Transportation and Infrastructure
  - Subcommittee on Highways and Transit
  - Subcommittee on Water Resources and Environment

=== Caucus memberships ===
- Congressional Asian Pacific American Caucus
- New Democrat Coalition

== Electoral history ==
California's 48th congressional district election, 2018
Primary election
Party	Candidate	Votes	%
Republican	Dana Rohrabacher (incumbent)	52,737	30.3
Democratic	Harley Rouda	30,099	17.3
Democratic	Hans Keirstead	29,974	17.2
Republican	Scott Baugh	27,514	15.8
Democratic	Omar Siddiqui	8,658	5.0
Republican	John Gabbard	5,664	3.3
Democratic	Rachel Payne (withdrawn)	3,598	2.1
Republican	Paul Martin	2,893	1.7
Republican	Shastina Sandman	2,762	1.6
Democratic	Michael Kotick (withdrawn)	2,606	1.5
Democratic	Laura Oatman (withdrawn)	2,412	1.4
Democratic	Deanie Schaarsmith	1,433	0.8
Democratic	Tony Zarkades	1,281	0.7
Libertarian	Brandon Reiser	964	0.6
Republican	Stelian Onufrei (withdrawn)	739	0.4
No party preference	Kevin Kensinger	690	0.4
Total votes		174,024	100.0
General election
Democratic	Harley Rouda	157,837	53.6
Republican	Dana Rohrabacher (incumbent)	136,899	46.4
Total votes		294,736	100.0
Democratic gain from Republican			

2020 California's 48th congressional district primary results by county supervisorial district Map legend: Rouda—50–60%; Rouda—40–50%

California's 48th congressional district, 2020
Primary election
Party	Candidate	Votes	%
Democratic	Harley Rouda (incumbent)	99,659	46.7
Republican	Michelle Steel	74,418	34.9
Republican	Brian Burley	25,884	12.1
American Independent	Richard Mata	5,704	2.7
Republican	John Thomas Schuesler	4,900	2.3
Republican	James Brian Griffin	2,714	1.3
Total votes		213,279	100.0
General election
Republican	Michelle Steel	196,208	50.9
Democratic	Harley Rouda (incumbent)	189,235	49.1
Total votes		385,443	100.0
Republican gain from Democratic			

== Personal life ==
Rouda and author Kaira Rouda (née Sturdivant) have been married since 1990. They have four children. They moved to California after Rouda sold the family firm.

Rouda has been heavily critical of former House colleague Katie Porter. In her recent memoir I Swear: Politics Is Messier Than My Minivan, Porter stated that Rouda mistook her for a valet and made heavy real estate purchases in D.C. In response, Rouda published an opinion piece in the Orange County Register criticizing Porter for her mischaracterizations of him and his family. He has referred to Porter as "a bully with a whiteboard" and called on voters to vote for anyone in the 2024 California Senate primary other than her.

U.S. House of Representatives
Preceded by Dana Rohrabacher	Member of the U.S. House of Representatives from California's 28th congressional district 2019–2021	Succeeded by Michelle Steel
U.S. order of precedence (ceremonial)
Preceded by TJ Cox as Former U.S. Representative	Order of precedence of the United States as Former U.S. Representative	Succeeded by John Duarte as Former U.S. Representative
