= Scott Baugh =

American politician (born 1962)

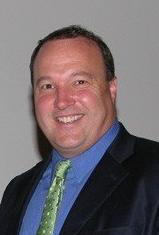

Minority Leader of the California Assembly
- In office April 6, 1999 – November 9, 2000
- Preceded by: Rod Pacheco
- Succeeded by: Bill Campbell

Member of the California State Assembly from the 67th district
- In office November 29, 1995 – November 30, 2000
- Preceded by: Doris Allen
- Succeeded by: Tom Harman

Personal details
- Born: Scott Randall Baugh; July 4, 1962 (age 64) Redding, California, U.S.
- Party: Republican
- Spouse: Wendy Baugh (m. 1997)
- Children: 1
- Education: Liberty University (BS); University of the Pacific (JD)
- Website: Campaign website

Scott Randall Baugh (born July 4, 1962) is an American attorney and politician. He is a member of the Republican Party. He served in the California State Assembly and served as the chair of the Republican Party in Orange County, California, from the early 2000s to 2015.

Baugh attended Liberty University and McGeorge School of Law. After graduating, Baugh served as an attorney in private practice in Huntington Beach. Baugh entered politics after a recall was initiated in 1995 for the 67th district of the state assembly; he served as minority leader of the California Assembly. After leaving office, he became the chairman of the local Republican Party.

Baugh was a twice unsuccessful Republican nominee for California's 47th congressional district in 2022 and 2024, losing to Democrats Katie Porter and Dave Min respectively.

== Early life and education ==
Scott Baugh was born in 1962 in Redding, California, to Helen and Cason Baugh and grew up on a 10-acre farm there. His father ran a linen supply business, and also leased ranchland. He was the fourth of five children. Baugh played as a middle linebacker on his high school football team, earning the nickname "Dr. Death" for his onfield prowess.

In 1984, Baugh earned his Bachelor of Science degree in business administration from Liberty University, graduating summa cum laude. During his senior year in college, he served as an intern for a congressman on Capitol Hill.

In 1987, Baugh earned his Juris Doctor, with honors, from the McGeorge School of Law. After graduating from law school, Baugh became an attorney in Huntington Beach, California.

== Career ==
=== Lawyer ===
After graduating from law school, Baugh went into private practice with a law firm in Sacramento, California. He later joined the corporate office of Union Pacific Railroad.

=== Assemblyman ===
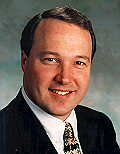
Baugh's official Assembly portrait

In 1995, Baugh ran as a replacement candidate for the recall of Assemblywoman Doris Allen. The recall election took place on November 28, 1995, and Allen was recalled with 65.19% voting to recall her. Baugh was endorsed by Governor Pete Wilson, the Republican Party of Orange County, the Orange County congressional delegation, and Republican members of the state legislature. Baugh won the replacement election with 40.9% of the vote.

In 1996, Baugh was involved in a controversy around the election that had legal ramifications. He was subsequently indicted by a grand jury for 22 charges, including four felonies, relating to violations of finance laws and perjury. Most of the original charges against Baugh were dismissed after a local judge ruled that the prosecutor's office had engaged in prosecutorial misconduct by failing to present exculpatory evidence to the grand jury. The key witness was found to be "unreliable". The case was eventually turned over to a different prosecutor after a local judge found that the original attorney engaged in "grave misconduct". California Attorney General Bill Lockyer eventually requested that the judge overseeing the case dismiss the criminal charges after the case deteriorated in light of the evidence. The case was referred to the Fair Political Practices Commission by the attorney general which eventually levied a fine for civil infractions.

While serving in the state legislature, Baugh focused his attention on judicial reform, liability laws and health insurance. Additionally, he authored a number of bills that focused on safety for minors.

==== 1997 ====
During his time in the State Assembly, Baugh worked against state regulation, including getting a bill passed that exempted new cars from smog checks for the first five years. This legislation is believed to have saved Californians 350 million dollars.

Serving as the vice chair of the Assembly Transportation Committee, he helped pass legislation that helped repair an eastern section of the San Francisco Bay Bridge.

==== Assembly Leader ====
Baugh was elected by his Republican colleagues to serve as Assembly Republican Leader in April 1999, a post he held until he was termed out in December 2000. Baugh's term as leader was characterized by members of both parties as successful as he consistently reached across the aisle. As leader, he sponsored legislation on grand jury reform and police officer training on the rights of suspects.

=== Orange County Republican Party ===
On April 19, 2004, Baugh was elected chairman of the Republican Party of Orange County, succeeding Tom Fuentes. Under his leadership, the party moderated its positions and repaired relations with state and national Republicans.

In March 2007, former Massachusetts Governor Mitt Romney, seeking the GOP nomination for president in 2008, announced that Baugh would serve as a member of his California statewide finance committee. In this capacity, he raised over $2 million for Romney in Orange County.

Baugh supported Romney in the 2012 presidential election. During the 2012 Republican Party presidential primaries, Baugh served as a California delegate.

In January 2015, Baugh stepped down as party chair and was succeeded by Fred Whitaker.

== U.S. House of Representatives ==
=== 2022 ===
After redistricting took place in 2021, Baugh was the Republican candidate for California's 47th congressional district in the 2022 election. He ran under the endorsement of several Republicans, including then House Minority Leader Kevin McCarthy. He advanced to the general election, where he lost to incumbent Democrat Katie Porter. He lost by 9,000 votes and was out-fundraised by Porter 28 million to 3 million.

=== 2024 ===
Baugh was the Republican candidate for California's 47th congressional district in the 2024 election. The seat was open in 2024 as incumbent Katie Porter ran for a U.S. Senate seat, but lost. Baugh advanced from the March 2024 primary election, where he lost to Democrat Dave Min. He lost by approximately 10,000 votes, conceding on Twitter "It has become clear that despite running a strong campaign, connecting with voters, and mobilizing an incredible volunteer effort - that effort is going to come up a little short."

== Political positions ==
=== Abortion ===
After the Dobbs decision, Baugh has described abortion as a “state-by-state issue".

In 2022, Baugh stated “Life begins at conception. Others may disagree as to precisely when life begins, but there should be no disagreement as to whether it is OK to abort children who have reached the point of viability. We need to promote a culture of life in America – not a culture of termination.”

=== Balanced Budget ===
Baugh is a proponent for responsible government spending and believes that the federal deficit needs to be balanced urgently. Additionally, he's an advocate for a constitutional amendment to require congress to balance the budget.

=== Congressional stock trading ===
Baugh opposes congressional stock trading and has called for all members of Congress to forego trading.

=== Foreign Aid ===
Baugh has called for reduced foreign aid by America "...the Litmus test for providing military and/or financial aid to foreign countries is whether America is protecting its citizens and is that aid promoting our national security interest. Far too often, our representatives entangle the U.S. in foreign affairs and foreign wars with very thin connections to national security, costing American lives and billions of dollars". Baugh has further commented, "... when it is clear that our national security is at risk ... the U.S. should provide assistance."

=== Government transparency ===
Baugh is a strong supporter of transparency in government, and has criticized the congressional fund that is used by the government to settle workplace disputes between government senior employers, including congressional office holders, and staff.

=== Immigration and border security ===
Baugh has expressed support for legal immigration and also supports strict enforcement of immigration law, such as employer verification. He is against mass deportation and advocates for a nuanced approach, believing that each case should consider the personal circumstances of the person's behaviour. Baugh is an advocate for tightening security at the border, advocating for a "tall fence and a wide gate". He has advocated for ensuring the government has policies in place to secure the border, reducing and eliminating crime around the border, and strengthening enforcement.

== Personal life ==
Baugh lives in Huntington Beach, California; with his wife Wendy and his son. Baugh is part of several community initiatives such as chairing the Orange County Gang Reduction Intervention Partnership and has worked with the OC Fair.

== Electoral history ==
=== State Assembly ===
==== 1995 ====
California's 67th State Assembly district election, 1996
Party	Candidate	Votes	%
Republican	Scott Baugh		45
Democratic	Linda Moulton-Patterson		38.07
Republican	Don MacAllister		11
Republican	Haydee Tillotson		7
Republican	Shirley Carey		5
Total votes		158,105	100.00
Republican win			

==== 1996 ====
California's 67th State Assembly district election, 1996
Party	Candidate	Votes	%
Republican	Scott Baugh (incumbent)	80,013	56.32
Democratic	Cliff Brightman	54,085	38.07
Reform	Donald W. Rowe	7,950	5.60
No party	Wayne Dapser (write-in)	14	0.01
Invalid or blank votes		16,043	10.15
Total votes		158,105	100.00
Republican hold			

==== 1998 ====
California's 67th State Assembly district election, 1998
Party	Candidate	Votes	%
Republican	Scott Baugh (incumbent)	66,570	57.53
Democratic	Marie H. Fennell	43,372	37.48
Libertarian	Autumn Browne	5,772	4.99
Invalid or blank votes		13,198	10.24
Total votes		128,912	100.00
Republican hold			

=== Congressional ===
==== 2018 ====
California's 48th congressional district election, 2018
Primary election
Party	Candidate	Votes	%
Republican	Dana Rohrabacher (incumbent)	52,737	30.3
Democratic	Harley Rouda	30,099	17.3
Democratic	Hans Keirstead	29,974	17.2
Republican	Scott Baugh	27,514	15.8
Democratic	Omar Siddiqui	8,658	5.0
Republican	John Gabbard	5,664	3.3
Democratic	Rachel Payne (withdrawn)	3,598	2.1
Republican	Paul Martin	2,893	1.7
Republican	Shastina Sandman	2,762	1.6
Democratic	Michael Kotick (withdrawn)	2,606	1.5
Democratic	Laura Oatman (withdrawn)	2,412	1.4
Democratic	Deanie Schaarsmith	1,433	0.8
Democratic	Tony Zarkades	1,281	0.7
Libertarian	Brandon Reiser	964	0.6
Republican	Stelian Onufrei (withdrawn)	739	0.4
No party preference	Kevin Kensinger	690	0.4
Total votes		174,024	100.0

==== 2022 ====
2022 California's 47th congressional district primary
Party	Candidate	Votes	%
Democratic	Katie Porter (incumbent)	86,742	51.7
Republican	Scott Baugh	51,776	30.9
Republican	Amy Phan West	13,949	8.3
Republican	Brian Burley	11,952	7.1
Republican	Errol Webber	3,342	2.0
Total votes		167,761	100.0

2022 California's 47th congressional district election
Party	Candidate	Votes	%
Democratic	Katie Porter (incumbent)	137,374	51.7
Republican	Scott Baugh	128,261	48.3
Total votes		265,635	100.0
Democratic hold			

==== 2024 ====
2024 California's 47th congressional district primary
Party	Candidate	Votes	%
Republican	Scott Baugh	49,799	32.8
Democratic	Dave Min	39,080	25.7
Democratic	Joanna Weiss	28,948	19.0
Republican	Max Ukropina	22,729	15.0
Republican	Long Pham	4,195	2.8
No party preference	Terry Crandall	2,400	1.6
Democratic	Boyd Roberts	2,012	1.3
No party preference	Tom McGrath	1,321	0.9
No party preference	Bill Smith	902	0.6
Democratic	Shariq Zaidi	672	0.4
Total votes		152,058	100.0

2024 California's 47th congressional district election
Party	Candidate	Votes	%
Democratic	Dave Min	181,721	51.44
Republican	Scott Baugh	171,554	48.56
Total votes		353,275	100.0
Democratic hold			

California Assembly
Preceded by Doris Allen	Member of the California Assembly from the 67th district 1995–2000	Succeeded by Tom Harman
Preceded by Rod Pacheco	Minority Leader of the California Assembly; 1999–2000	Succeeded by Bill Campbell
