= Dave Min =

American politician (born 1976)

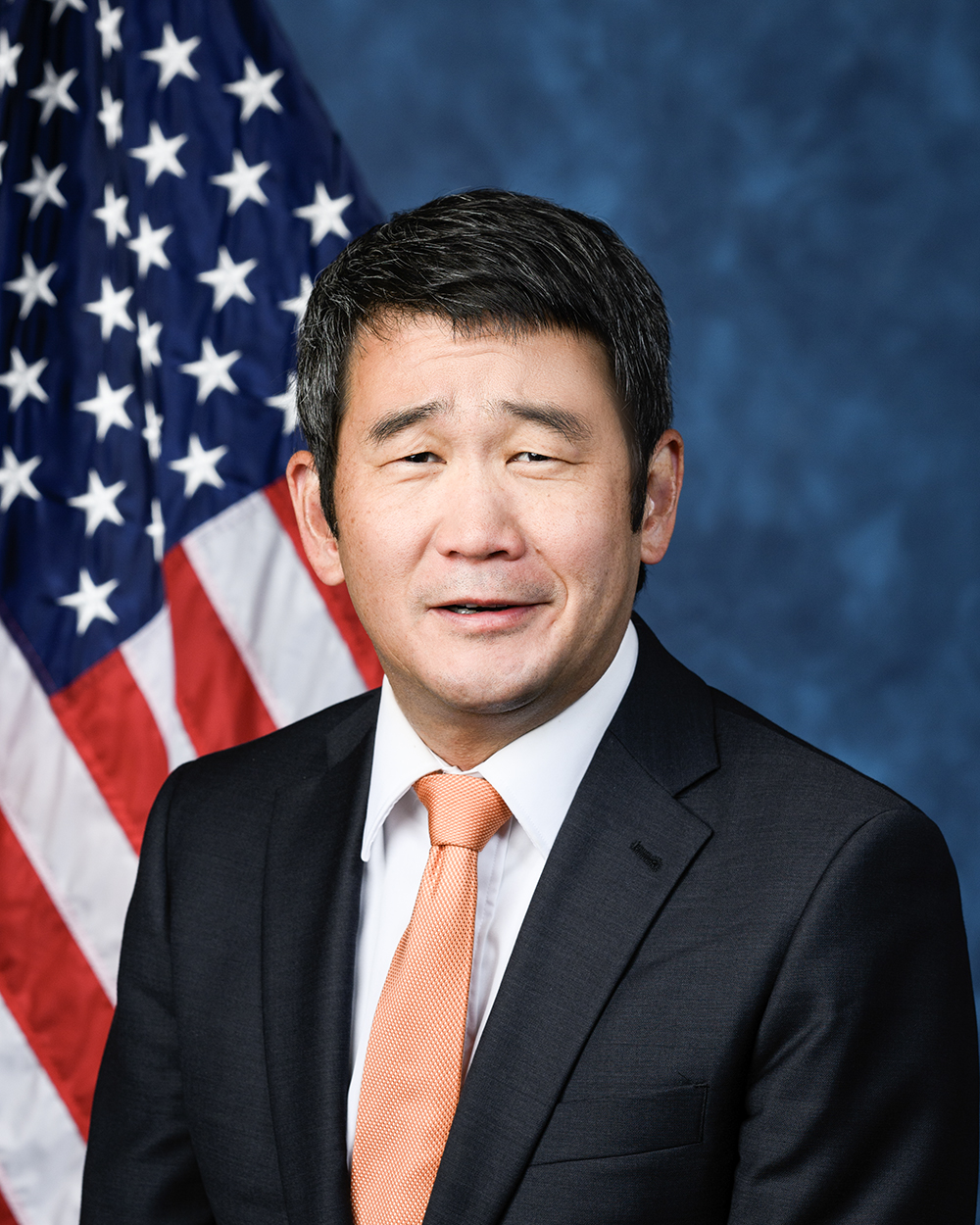
- Official portrait, 2024

Member of the U.S. House of Representatives from California's 47th district
- Incumbent
- Assumed office January 3, 2025
- Preceded by: Katie Porter

Member of the California Senate from the 37th district
- In office December 7, 2020 – November 30, 2024
- Preceded by: John Moorlach
- Succeeded by: Steven Choi

Personal details
- Born: David Kunnghee Min; March 5, 1976 (age 50) Providence, Rhode Island, U.S.
- Party: Democratic
- Spouse: Jane Stoever (m. 2005)
- Children: 3
- Education: University of Pennsylvania (BA, BS); Harvard University (JD)
- Website: House website Campaign website

Korean name
- Hangul: 민건기
- RR: Min Geongi
- MR: Min Kŏn'gi

David Kunnghee Min (Korean: 민건기; born March 5, 1976) is an American lawyer and politician who has served as the U.S. representative from California's 47th congressional district since 2025. A member of the Democratic Party, he represented the 37th district in the California State Senate, which includes portions of Orange County, from 2020 to 2024. He was an assistant law professor at the University of California, Irvine prior to being elected to office.

Min ran in the 2018 election to represent California's 45th congressional district but was defeated in the nonpartisan blanket primary by incumbent Congresswoman Mimi Walters and fellow UC Irvine professor Katie Porter, who went on to defeat Walters in the general election. He was elected to the state senate in the 2020 elections after defeating Costa Mesa mayor and future Orange County Board of Supervisors member Katrina Foley in the primary and then by narrowly defeating incumbent Republican John Moorlach in the November election.

Min defeated Republican nominee Scott Baugh in the 2024 election to represent California's 47th congressional district.

== Early life and career ==
Min was born on March 5, 1976, in Providence, Rhode Island, and raised in Palo Alto, California. His parents immigrated to the United States from South Korea in 1972 to pursue doctoral degrees at Brown University. Min was an Eagle Scout.

He attended the University of Pennsylvania, earning a Bachelor of Science in economics from the Wharton School and a Bachelor of Arts in philosophy from the arts and science college, both in 1999, graduating magna cum laude and Phi Beta Kappa. He then attended Harvard Law School, where he earned his Juris Doctor in 2002.

After graduating from Harvard Law School, Min worked in financial regulation as a staff attorney at the U.S. Securities and Exchange Commission, as a counsel to Senator Chuck Schumer on the U.S. Senate Banking Committee, and as counsel and senior policy advisor to the Joint Economic Committee. In 2009, he joined the Center for American Progress, a liberal think tank, as its associate director for financial markets policy and supervisor of its Mortgage Finance Working Group.

He became an assistant law professor at the University of California, Irvine in 2012 and focused on banking law, capital markets, and real estate finance. The same year, he testified about the impact of Dodd-Frank Financial Regulations to the House Financial Services Subcommittee, one of six instances where he testified before Congress. He passed the California bar exam in 2022.

== Early political career ==
=== 2018 congressional campaign ===
Min announced his House candidacy on April 5, 2017, challenging incumbent Rep. Mimi Walters in California's 45th congressional district. Min stated he was inspired to run for Congress after President Donald Trump temporarily suspended immigration from certain predominantly Muslim countries, which he said was a "slap in the face" to the son of two immigrants. Min said there is a new "groundswell of political consciousness" nationally among Korean Americans, with people starting to feel comfortable enough to enter politics.

Min received the endorsement of the California Democratic Party at its State Convention in February 2018 after a contentious floor fight where he barely received the necessary 60% of the vote.

Min criticized Walters for living outside of the district and for refusing to hold public or in-person town halls. Min came in third place in the primary election behind Walters and Katie Porter. Porter went on to win the general election.

== California State Senate ==
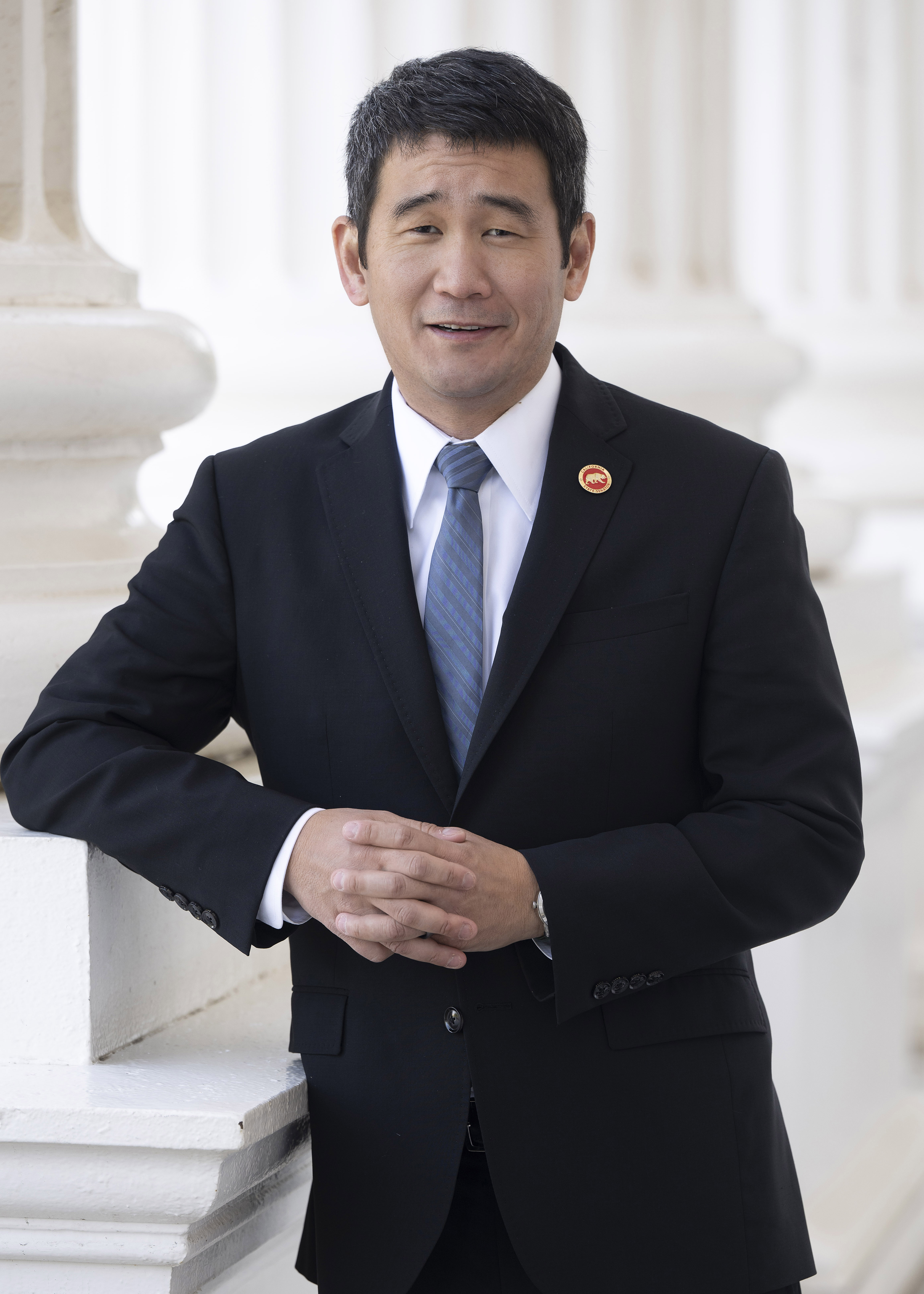
Official portrait as state senator, 2023

=== Elections ===
On January 9, 2019, Min announced his campaign against State Senator John Moorlach to represent the California's 37th State Senate district. In the primary election, Min defeated Costa Mesa Mayor Katrina Foley, thus advancing to the general election to face Moorlach.

Min narrowly defeated Moorlach in the fall of 2020 with 51.2% of the vote. He assumed office on December 7, 2020. His term lasted four years.

=== Tenure ===
In the State Senate, Min chaired the Natural Resources and Water Committee. He played a leading role in California’s push to ban offshore oil and gas drilling, sponsoring the state legislation that would have enacted the prohibition.

He was the author of California's 30 by 30 bill, which was signed by Governor Gavin Newsom in 2023, making it the first such law signed into law in the nation. He also carried major clean-energy/decarbonization legislation including SB 1221, in 2024, which authorized neighborhood-scale zero-emission alternatives to aging gas-pipeline investments.

Min also introduced legislation to facilitate the termination of offshore oil drilling leases in Orange County following the 2021 Huntington Beach oil spill, but it died following opposition from the oil industry and trade unions. Some lawmakers, including Bob Hertzberg, expressed concerns about the cost of Min's proposed legislation. In 2024, he led an effort to prohibit investor-owned utilities from charging ratepayers for political activity and advertising.

While in office, Min introduced legislation related to violence, including bills to expand protections for survivors of domestic abuse, study harassment on California's transit systems, and make child custody cases private by default. He also led the legislative effort to ban gun shows at county fairs and other public properties statewide, introducing the measure that was later challenged in federal court and ultimately upheld by the U.S. Supreme Court.

Min authored a bill that was signed into law in 2024 requiring automakers to cut off an abuser's remote access to a vehicle's location tracking systems at a domestic violence survivor's request. He also successfully drafted and had passed legislation that would bar local governments from imposing voter ID requirements stricter than those in California law.

== U.S. House of Representatives ==
=== Elections ===
==== 2024 ====
Min announced a second campaign for Congress in January 2023, running for California's 47th congressional district. Katie Porter, the incumbent representative who defeated Min in the 2018 congressional primary, vacated the seat to run in the 2024 United States Senate election in California and endorsed Min to succeed her. He was also endorsed by the Los Angeles Times, Planned Parenthood, the League of Conservation Voters, and the Fraternal Order of Police.

Min was arrested in Sacramento for drunk driving during the campaign in 2023, to which he pleaded no contest. He also stated that he would stop drinking. His campaign was opposed by the American Israel Public Affairs Committee (AIPAC) which spent over $4.5 million in an unsuccessful campaign to stop Min from advancing in California's top-two primary.

He finished second in the top two primary for CA-47 and advanced to the general election. In the general election, he faced Scott Baugh, a former assemblymember who had previously lost to Porter in 2022. Min won with 51.4% of the vote to Baugh's 48.6%.

==== 2026 ====
The congressional map adopted by California voters in Proposition 50 in November 2025 extended the 47th district inland, a change estimated to increase the number of Democrats in the district by about 4%. In 2026, Min won the June top-two primary and will face Republican Jenny Rae Le Reux in the general election.

Min won the general election with 58% of the vote to Rae Le Reux's 42%.

=== Tenure ===
Min was sworn in on January 3, 2025. Shortly after taking office, he voted against Trump's One Big Beautiful Bill Act which he described as a "disaster for California families." The bill would have added $3.3 trillion to the national deficit and included over $100 billion in new funding for Immigration and Customs Enforcement (ICE).

Min voted against a GOP immigration bill that would make sexual and domestic violence deportable offenses which he stated would create an "unintended chilling effect for victims of sexual abuse, who might fear they could be deported if they report the crime". He noted that non-citizens convicted of domestic violence and sexual assault were already deportable. Min was one of 46 House Democrats to vote for the Laken Riley Act.

In April 2025, Min and Rep. April McClain Delaney led a group of 16 Democratic lawmakers in warning nine major law firms that agreements they had reached with the Trump administration could violate federal and state bribery, extortion, and racketeering laws. When the firms defended the agreements, Min said state and local authorities could investigate them and suggested federal investigations could follow if Democrats returned to power.

In September 2025, as a member of the House Oversight Committee, Min pressed for greater disclosure in the congressional investigation into Jeffrey Epstein, supporting the bipartisan effort to compel the Justice Department to release the Epstein files. In March 2026, during the committee’s investigation, he publicly challenged claims by Epstein associates that they had been unaware of his abuse.

In January 2026, Min participated in a House Democrats field oversight hearing in Minnesota following Operation Metro Surge during which he opposed full-year funding for ICE, calling for the resignation or removal of then-Homeland Security Secretary Kristi Noem, and warned against potential ICE actions in Southern California. In February, he officially opposed ICE's plans to open a new office within his district in Irvine.

In May 2026, Min along with Senator Peter Welch and Rep. Raul Ruiz, opened an investigation into potential "pay to play" pardons. The investigation examined whether financial contributions, intermediaries, or personal connections had influenced clemency decisions by the Trump administration. The following month, Min and Welch requested that the White House, Department of Justice, and U.S. Secret Service preserve records related to 17 pardons and commutations.

In September 2026, Min introduced legislation to name the USPS facility in Irvine the Mary Kageyama Nomura Post Office Building to honor the legacy of Mary Kageyama Nomura, known as the Songbird of Manzanar; if passed, it would be the first post office named in honor of a Japanese American who was incarcerated during World War II at a concentration camp. He previously honored Nomura on the House floor.

=== Committee assignments ===
- Committee on Natural Resources
  - Subcommittee on Energy and Mineral Resources
  - Subcommittee on Water, Wildlife and Fisheries
- Committee on Oversight and Government Reform
  - Subcommittee on Economic Growth, Energy Policy, and Regulatory Affairs

=== Caucus membership ===
- Congressional Equality Caucus
- Congressional Asian Pacific American Caucus
- Congressional Progressive Caucus
- Future Forum
- Taiwan Caucus

== Political positions ==
=== Abortion ===
Min supports federal legislation that protects abortion rights. In his 2024 campaign, he made abortion the central contrast with his opponent who had called it a state issue.

=== Gun policy ===
Min supports gun control measures. As a state senator, he authored laws that banned gun shows at the Orange County Fairgrounds and on other state-owned property, describing it as a first step towards reducing gun violence in the county.

=== Immigration ===
Min was one of 46 House Democrats to vote for the Laken Riley Act in January 2025. Min supports immigration enforcement but has criticized ICE tactics: he has opposed full year funding for ICE and a planned ICE office in Irvine.

=== Israel ===
During the 2024 primary, Min said he would support extending the U.S.-Israel memorandum of understanding on military aid with full funding and would oppose conditions on aid targeted at Israel. Democratic Majority for Israel nonetheless endorsed his primary opponent, and a super PAC affiliated with AIPAC spent against his candidacy, citing his criticism of Prime Minister Benjamin Netanyahu and his ties to J Street. Min later voted against Israel military aid in 2026.

=== Environment and energy ===
Min has made offshore oil drilling a signature issue since the 2021 Orange County oil spill, sponsoring state legislation to end drilling in state waters, and in Congress, he wrote a bill to fund coastal biodiversity monitoring.

=== Criminal justice ===
Min broke with most Democrats in September 2025 to vote for two Republican bills that strengthened juvenile sentencing in Washington, D.C., while he also opposed a third bill on police pursuits in the city. He also noted that he supported D.C. home rule despite his votes.

== Personal life ==
Min is married to Jane Stoever, a clinical professor of law at UC Irvine. She works on domestic violence issues. They have three children. He is Episcopalian.

== Electoral history ==
=== 2018 ===
2018 California's 45th congressional district election
Primary election
Party	Candidate	Votes	%
Republican	Mimi Walters (incumbent)	86,764	51.7
Democratic	Katie Porter	34,078	20.3
Democratic	Dave Min	29,979	17.8
Democratic	Brian Forde	10,107	6.0
No party preference	John Graham	3,817	2.3
Democratic	Kia Hamadanchy	3,212	1.9
Total votes		167,957	100.0
General election
Democratic	Katie Porter	158,906	52.1
Republican	Mimi Walters (incumbent)	146,383	47.9
Total votes		305,289	100.0
Democratic gain from Republican			

=== 2020 ===
2020 California's 37th State Senate district election
Primary election
Party	Candidate	Votes	%
Republican	John Moorlach (incumbent)	132,275	47.3
Democratic	Dave Min	78,293	28.0
Democratic	Katrina Foley	68,952	24.7
Total votes		279,520	100.0
General election
Democratic	Dave Min	270,522	51.1
Republican	John Moorlach (incumbent)	258,421	48.9
Total votes		528,943	100.0
Democratic gain from Republican			

=== 2024 ===
2024 California's 47th congressional district election
Primary election
Party	Candidate	Votes	%
Republican	Scott Baugh	57,517	32.1
Democratic	Dave Min	46,393	25.9
Democratic	Joanna Weiss	34,802	19.4
Republican	Max Ukropina	26,585	14.8
Republican	Long Pham	4,862	2.7
No party preference	Terry Crandall	2,878	1.6
Democratic	Boyd Roberts	2,570	1.4
No party preference	Tom McGrath	1,611	0.9
No party preference	Bill Smith	1,062	0.6
Democratic	Shariq Zaidi	788	0.4
Total votes		179,068	100.0
General election
Democratic	Dave Min	181,721	51.4
Republican	Scott Baugh	171,554	48.6
Total votes		353,275	100.0
Democratic hold			

=== 2026 ===
2026 California's 47th congressional district election
Primary election
Party	Candidate	Votes	%
Democratic	Dave Min (incumbent)	89,482	45.5
Republican	Jenny Le Roux	49,208	25.0
Democratic	Hunter Miranda	16,849	8.6
Republican	Michael Maxsenti	13,757	7.0
Republican	Bill Brough	11,769	6.0
Republican	Christopher Gonzales	9,810	5.0
No party preference	Eric Troutman	3,947	2.0
Libertarian	Derrick Reid	1,290	0.7
No party preference	Jesus Patino	761	0.4
Total votes		196,873	100.0
General election
Democratic	Dave Min (incumbent)		
Republican	Jenny Le Roux		
Total votes			100.0

== See also ==
- List of Asian Americans and Pacific Islands Americans in the United States Congress
- Asian Americans in politics

U.S. House of Representatives
Preceded by Katie Porter	Member of the U.S. House of Representatives from California's 47th congressional district 2025–present	Incumbent
U.S. order of precedence (ceremonial)
Preceded by Mark Messmer	United States representatives by seniority 405th	Succeeded by Riley Moore
