= Katie Porter =

American politician (born 1974)

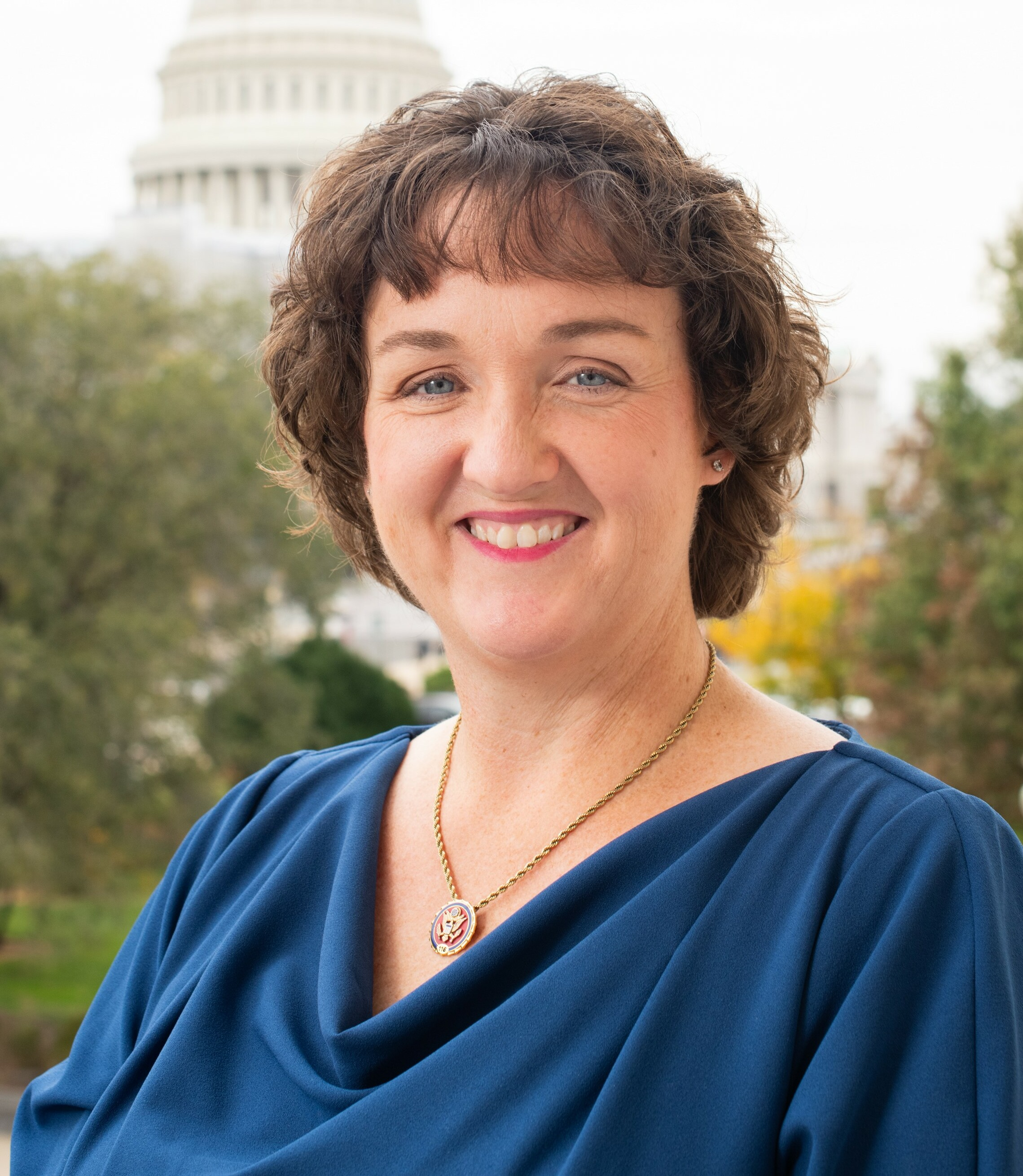
- Official portrait, 2019

Member of the U.S. House of Representatives from California
- In office January 3, 2019 – January 3, 2025
- Preceded by: Mimi Walters
- Succeeded by: Dave Min
- Constituency: 45th district (2019–2023); 47th district (2023–2025)

Personal details
- Born: Katherine Moore Porter; January 3, 1974 (age 52) Fort Dodge, Iowa, U.S.
- Party: Democratic
- Spouse: Matthew Hoffman (m. 2003; div. 2013)
- Children: 3
- Education: Yale University (BA); Harvard University (JD)
- Website: Campaign website
- Porter's voice Porter on noncompete contracts. Recorded February 28, 2023

Katherine Moore Porter (born January 3, 1974) is an American former politician who served as a U.S. representative from California from 2019 to 2025. A member of the Democratic Party, she was a candidate in the 2024 U.S. Senate election in California and the 2026 California gubernatorial election. She did not advance from the nonpartisan primary in either race, placing third and fifth, respectively. Her poor showing was blamed, in part, on negative media attention regarding allegations of abusive behavior towards her congressional staff. In July 2026 she implied that she was retiring from politics.

Born in Fort Dodge, Iowa, Porter graduated from the Phillips Academy boarding school, Yale University, and Harvard Law School. In 2018, she was elected to Congress as part of a Democratic wave in Orange County, flipping the 45th district. In 2022, after redistricting, she was reelected in the 47th congressional district, and was in office until 2025. In the House, she was deputy chair of the Congressional Progressive Caucus, and received media attention for her questioning during congressional hearings, during which she was noted for her use of whiteboards.

== Early life and education ==
Porter was born on January 3, 1974, in Fort Dodge, Iowa. She grew up on a farm in southern Iowa. Her father, Dan Porter, was a farmer and a banker. Her mother, Liz Porter, was co-founder of Fons & Porter's Love of Quilting, a highly successful quilting venture that expanded into a prominent multimedia empire comprising a nationally broadcast television program, a dedicated magazine, and a commercial product line. According to federal financial disclosures made during Katie Porter's 2018 congressional campaign, Porter's mother acted as the direct lender for one of Porter's primary home mortgages, valued between $300,000 and $600,000.

Porter attended Phillips Academy, a boarding school near Boston. In 1996, she received her Bachelor of Arts degree in American studies from Yale University. While at Yale, Porter interned for Republican Senator Chuck Grassley.

Porter later attended Harvard Law School, where she was the notes editor for the Harvard Women's Law Journal and a member of the Board of Student Advisers. She studied under bankruptcy law professor and future U.S. senator Elizabeth Warren, and graduated magna cum laude with her Juris Doctor in 2001.

== Early career ==
Porter was a law clerk for Judge Richard S. Arnold of the United States Court of Appeals for the 8th Circuit in Little Rock, Arkansas. She practiced for a little over a year as an associate with the prominent corporate law firm of Stoel Rives LLP in Portland, Oregon, representing institutional clients and Fortune 100 companies. She was the project director for five months with the National Conference of Bankruptcy Judges' Business Bankruptcy Project.

Porter was an associate professor of law for a year at William S. Boyd School of Law of the University of Nevada, Las Vegas. In 2005, she joined the faculty of the University of Iowa College of Law as an associate professor, becoming a full professor there in 2011, her last year with the law school. Also in 2011, she became a tenured professor at the University of California, Irvine School of Law.

In 2008, Porter testified before the House Subcommittee on Financial Institutions and Consumer Credit alongside then-Harvard Law Professor Elizabeth Warren on the proposed Credit CARD Act of 2009, which was later signed into law.

In March 2012, California attorney general Kamala Harris appointed Porter to be the state's independent monitor of banks in a nationwide $25 billion mortgage settlement. As monitor, she oversaw the banks' implementation of $9.5 billion in settlement reforms for Californians.

In 2015, Porter consulted for Ocwen Financial Corporation, a large mortgage loan servicing provider that was subjected to multibillion-dollar fines and other penalties for deceiving homeowners. Reporters noted that Porter had left this entirely off her official academic curriculum vitae and public campaign biographies, with her campaign removing a reference to the role within three months of launching her initial 2018 congressional bid. Political critics and opponents cited her decision to engage in private corporate consulting for a predatory lender—and its subsequent omission from public records—as a contradiction to her public branding as an anti-Wall Street populist and consumer advocate.

== Political career ==
=== U.S. House of Representatives ===
==== Elections ====
===== 2018 =====
In April 2017, Porter announced her candidacy for Congress in California's 45th congressional district against two-term Republican incumbent Mimi Walters. In May 2018, Politico reported that Democrats were confident they would oust Walters, given that Hillary Clinton carried the 45th District in 2016, with Porter stating that "Orange County families are very concerned about what Donald Trump is doing" and "Mimi Walters votes with Trump over and over and over again." Porter finished second in a June 2018 primary and advanced to the general election.

Porter's mandatory campaign financial disclosures revealed an estimated net worth of approximately $1.57 million to $1.6 million. Her asset portfolio included significant real estate holdings, a private investment portfolio, and real estate value stemming from a university-subsidized home purchase through UC Irvine. Porter's mandatory 2018 campaign financial disclosures indicated that she carried zero student loan debt. Her level of personal wealth drew scrutiny from critics who contrast her affluent background with her campaign branding. While Porter heavily emphasizes her public image as a working-class, "minivan-driving single mother" who shares the everyday economic struggles of average families, critics argue that her inherited family wealth, elite education, and standard $174,000 congressional salary represent a life of substantial economic privilege.

Porter faced off against Walters in the general election on November 6, 2018. Walters led at the end of election night, but in the following days, as more ballots were tabulated, Porter gained votes and eventually overtook Walters. Walters alleged unsubstantiated voter fraud by Democrats, claiming they sought to "steal" her seat.

On November 15, 2018, the Associated Press called the race for Porter, marking the first Democratic victory in the district since its 1953 creation. Following her win, Porter pledged to reform campaign finance laws and highlighted her refusal of corporate PAC donations in her campaign. Porter's win contributed to a wave for Democrats in Orange County that saw them flip four seats centered in the county, resulting in Democratic control of all seven seats in the historically Republican county.

===== 2020 =====
Porter ran for reelection to a second term. She advanced from the top-two primary in first place and faced off against the second-place finisher, Republican Mission Viejo mayor Greg Raths, in the general election.

Porter maintained a substantial fundraising advantage over Raths. According to final campaign finance disclosures compiled by OpenSecrets, Porter raised over $16.6 million for her reelection campaign, placing her among the top fundraising House candidates nationwide, while Raths raised approximately $1.28 million. Political analysts and critics noted that this significant spending discrepancy, which exceeded a 10-to-one ratio, allowed Porter's campaign to deploy extensive targeted advertising campaigns that contrasted with her opponent's underfunded, grassroots operation.

Porter won with 53.5% of the vote to Raths's 46.5%.

===== 2022 =====
In the 2022 campaign, Porter used a massive war chest that ranked her among the top five congressional fundraisers nationwide. Her campaign spent over $28.8 million, outspending Republican nominee Scott Baugh's $3.1 million operation by a nearly nine-to-one ratio.

Porter was reelected in California's 47th congressional district, defeating Republican nominee Scott Baugh with 51.6% of the vote to Baugh's 48.4%.

==== Tenure ====
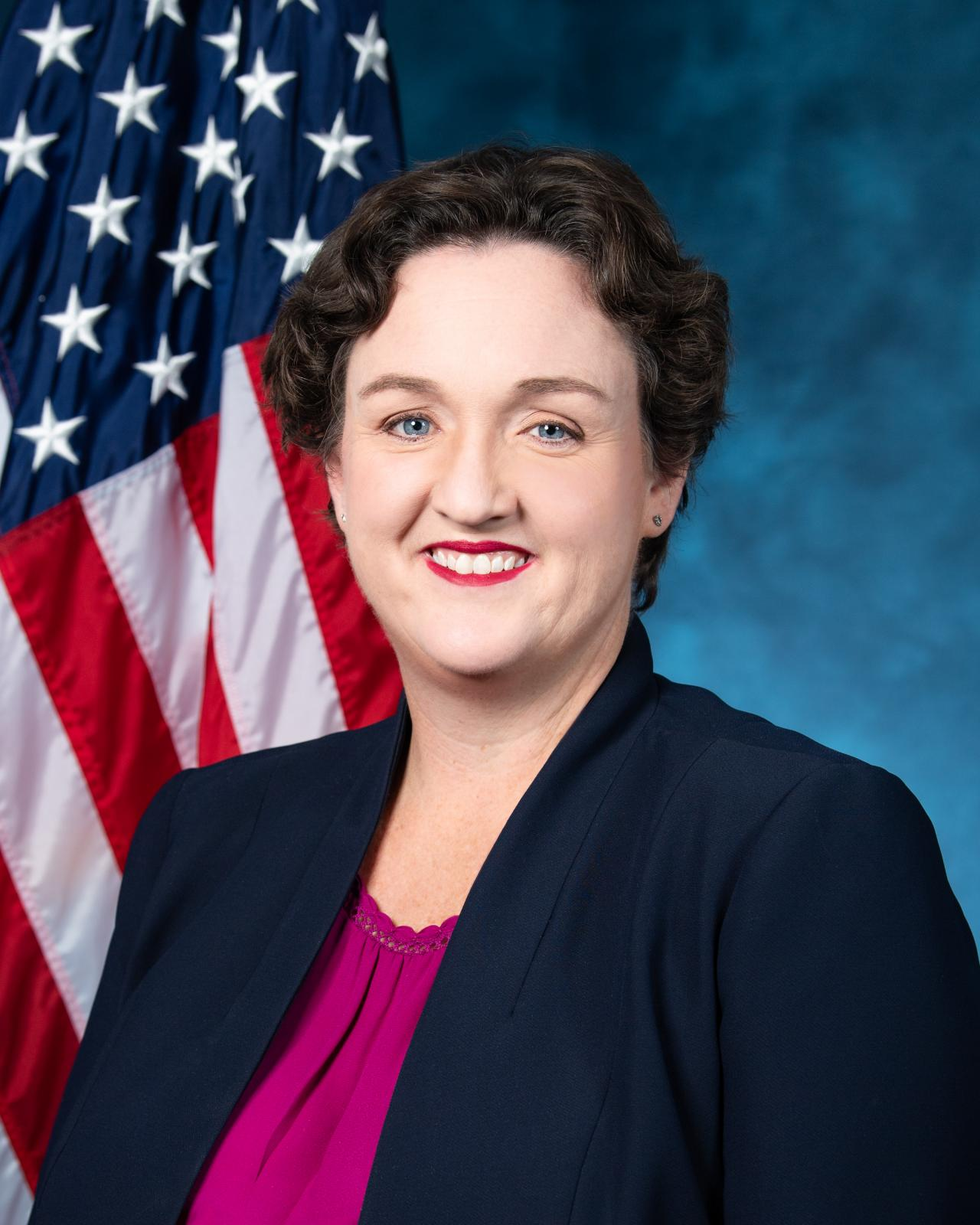
Porter during the 116th Congress in 2019.

Porter with US Secretary of Labor Marty Walsh in 2021.

In June 2019, Porter became one of the first Democrats in a swing district to support an impeachment inquiry following Robert Mueller's Special Counsel investigation. She voted for both the first and second impeachments of Donald Trump.

In January 2021, Porter lost her seat on the House Financial Services Committee after her request for a waiver to serve on three committees simultaneously was denied by Democratic leadership. On the Oversight committee, Porter participated in an investigation into the National Highway Traffic Safety Administration (NHTSA)'s test standards for children's car seats and boosters side-impact.

Porter served as one of three co-chairs of Elizabeth Warren's 2020 presidential campaign.

Porter drew public scrutiny when private messages were published showing her labeling the Irvine Police Department a "disgrace" following the arrest of an associate of hers at a public town hall event.

===== Hearings =====
During Trump's first presidency, Porter gained notice for her pointed questioning of public officials and business leaders during congressional hearings, often using visual aids such as whiteboards. In March 2019, she questioned Wells Fargo CEO Tim Sloan, arguing that he contradicted his lawyers' "corporate puffery". In April 2019, she questioned JPMorgan Chase CEO Jamie Dimon regarding employee wages. In May 2019, she asked Housing and Urban Development Secretary Ben Carson about "REOs", real estate owned properties. She questioned Consumer Financial Protection Bureau director Kathy Kraninger on basic math problems about annual percentage rates on payday loans, which Kraninger declined to answer. In March 2020, Centers for Disease Control and Prevention director Robert R. Redfield committed to free COVID-19 testing during questioning by Porter.

At an August 24, 2020, congressional hearing, Porter questioned Postmaster General Louis DeJoy. He admitted to her that he did not know the cost of mailing a postcard or a smaller greeting card, the starting rate for U.S. Priority Mail, or how many Americans voted by mail in the 2016 elections. In a December 2020 House hearing, she questioned United States Secretary of the Treasury Steve Mnuchin over COVID-19 relief funding.

Political opponents and conservative commentators criticized her whiteboard interrogations as performative political theater and gimmickry designed to generate viral video clips for social media fundraising rather than serious policy review, and said that they yielded limited long-term legislative achievements, rarely translating into major bipartisan policy reforms within the agencies she scrutinized.

===== Toxic workplace allegations =====
In late 2022, leaked private text messages surfaced detailing an exchange in which Porter berated a staff member and Navy veteran for allegedly breaching COVID-19 office safety protocols.

In January 2023, Politico reported on extensive criticism that Porter was "allegedly a terrible—according to some accounts, abusive and racist—boss" who was rage-prone.

The Washington Post interviewed eight former employees on condition of anonymity about their experiences working for Porter. The staffers described her as domineering and recounted multiple examples of her mistreatment of staffers, including instances in which she berated staffers until they cried. The allegations were consistently supported by nonpartisan legislative tracking data, which placed Porter's office near the top of annual congressional rankings for the highest rate of staff turnover.

In response to the allegations that she created a toxic workplace, Porter defended herself on The View in April 2023 by comparing herself to women of color who are discriminated against.

In October 2025, a video of an online interview from July 2021 between then-Energy Secretary Jennifer Granholm and Porter resurfaced. In the background, one of Porter's staffers appeared and Porter shouted "Get out of my fucking shot!" After the video resurfaced, Porter stated that "what I did to the staffer was wrong." She also said that she apologized to the staffer and thanked her for correcting a misstatement that she had made.

===== Committee assignments =====
For the 116th Congress:

- Committee on Oversight and Reform
  - Subcommittee on Economic Growth, Energy Policy and Regulatory Affairs

For the 117th Congress:

- Committee on Natural Resources
- Committee on Oversight and Accountability

For the 118th Congress:

- Committee on Natural Resources
  - Subcommittee on Federal Lands
  - Subcommittee on Water, Wildlife and Fisheries
- Committee on Oversight and Accountability
  - Subcommittee on Health Care and Financial Services (Ranking Member)
  - Subcommittee on National Security, the Border, and Foreign Affairs
- Joint Economic Committee

===== Caucus memberships =====
- Congressional Asian Pacific American Caucus
- Congressional Progressive Caucus
- Congressional Caucus for the Equal Rights Amendment
- Congressional Taiwan Caucus
- Rare Disease Caucus

=== 2024 U.S. Senate campaign ===
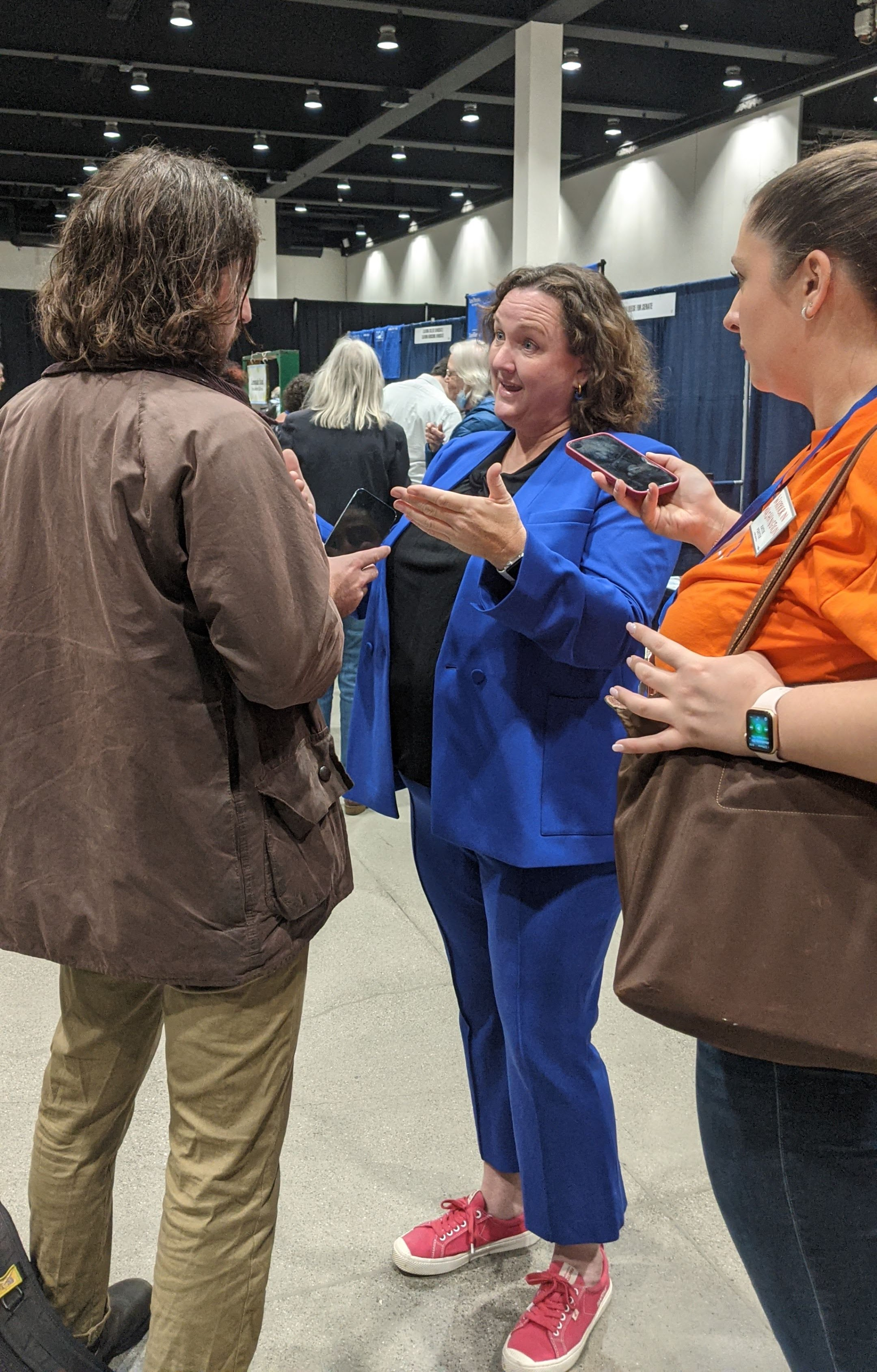
Katie Porter speaking to reporters at the California Democratic Party Fall Endorsing Convention in 2023.

On January 10, 2023, Porter announced her candidacy in the 2024 election for the U.S. Senate from California. The announcement came before the incumbent, Dianne Feinstein, had announced whether she would seek reelection. Porter raised over $1 million in donations in the 24 hours after announcing her candidacy, with an average donation of $38. Her supporters formed a super PAC called Women Have Initiative To Elect, Boost, and Organize for A Real Democrat (WHITEBOARD).

Her major opponents in the campaign were Democrat Adam Schiff, Republican Steve Garvey, a former professional baseball player, and Democrat Barbara Lee, a progressive congresswoman.

Porter's campaign faced criticism from watchdog groups who noted that despite her public pledge to reject corporate political action committee cash, she consistently accepted large, direct campaign contributions from executive leadership within the pharmaceutical and financial sectors.

During the campaign, Porter's campaign offered to sell her extensive donor fundraising list of phone numbers and email addresses to interested parties.

Porter failed to advance from the March 5 nonpartisan primary, finishing third; Schiff and Garvey advanced to the November general election. With at least 99% of votes counted, Porter trailed Schiff and Garvey by between 800,000 and 1.2 million votes, with Porter failing to lead in any county. The loss ensured that Porter, who did not seek reelection to her House seat, would leave Congress by January 2025.

After her loss in the primary, Porter said the election had been "rigged by billionaires" against her. She claimed that the "rigging" criticism referred to Schiff's campaign and allies raising and spending $11 million in the nonpartisan primary to boost a Republican candidate and knock her out of the general election. Her use of the word "rigged" triggered backlash from some Democrats and political scientists, who condemned her language for echoing former president Trump's refusal to accept his 2020 loss with rhetoric that undermined public trust in valid election outcomes. Porter later expressed regret, saying, "I wish I had chosen a different word." She said that her assertions about the "rigging" were not related to counting of votes or the election process, which she called "beyond reproach". Porter said: "That is a dishonest means to manipulate the outcome. I said 'rigged by billionaires' and our politics are in fact manipulated by big dark money. Defending democracy means calling that out."

=== 2026 California gubernatorial campaign ===
On March 11, 2025, Porter announced that she would enter California's 2026 gubernatorial race.

On October 8, 2025, Porter threatened to walk out of an interview with CBS News Sacramento Correspondent Julie Watts. When the reporter asked Porter what she would say to the millions of Californians who voted for Donald Trump, Porter "scoffed" at Watts' assertion that she would need those voters to win the race, and grew "palpably irritated" by follow-up questions. After Watts assured Porter that other candidates had answered the question and that her interviewing was not intended to be combative, Porter threatened to walk out of the interview. When Watts asked if Porter intended to continue the interview, Porter replied: "Nope, not like this I'm not. Not with seven follow-ups to every question you ask," though they ultimately continued with the interview. Porter's opponents in the race condemned her behavior in the interview; former Los Angeles Mayor and opposing candidate Antonio Villaraigosa said the incident raised questions about Porter's basic psychological fitness to "answer simple questions."

On May 12, 2026, Porter sought to garner support for her campaign via a Jeopardy-style game.

Porter suffered a decisive defeat in the June 2, 2026 primary election, finishing a distant fifth with just 4.4% of the statewide vote. Following her back-to-back statewide defeats, Porter announced her formal retirement from electoral politics in July 2026.

However, in September 2026 she accepted an appointment from Governor Gavin Newsom to serve on the California Community Colleges Board of Governors.

== Political positions ==
=== Social issues ===
==== Antisemitism ====
On May 1, 2024, Porter voted against the Antisemitism Awareness Act, which required the Department of Education to use the International Holocaust Remembrance Alliance's (IHRA) definition of antisemitism when reviewing Title VI discrimination cases in higher education. The bipartisan measure ultimately passed by a 320–91 margin, and the vote drew strong condemnation from proponents of the bill who argued that rejecting the standard definition undermined federal protections for Jewish college students experiencing campus hostility. Representative Mike Lawler criticized opponents of the legislation, asserting that establishing a unified federal definition was vital to crack down on antisemitic hate and hold school administrators accountable.

==== Housing ====
During her 2024 Senate campaign, Porter blamed the housing crisis on landlords and "Wall Street". She argued that federal government investment in housing is needed in response to California's housing crisis. She supports increased funding for Section 8 vouchers and an increase in the low-income housing tax credit.

Her housing platform drew sharp criticism from opponents who pointed out an inconsistency in her anti-landlord rhetoric, noting her personal financial disclosures revealed she earned passive income as a residential landlord while using a subsidized housing program through the University of California, Irvine.

==== Abortion rights ====
Porter consistently opposed the overturning of Roe v. Wade.

==== Immigration and border security ====
Porter has endorsed calls to abolish Immigration and Customs Enforcement (ICE). Additionally, during her 2024 U.S. Senate campaign, Porter broke with mainstream Democratic leadership by opposing a bipartisan Senate border security compromise.

Porter's immigration rhetoric became a focal point of local political debate following a televised appearance during the 2026 gubernatorial primary where she defended California's sanctuary state laws and asserted that undocumented immigrants were primarily driving California's demographic growth and significantly boosting the state's economy. She stated, "These are Californians. They contribute to our economy. They pay taxes. And they're one of the only ways that our state has been growing in recent years." These positions faced pushback from critics who argued that her platforms overlooked the economic strain undocumented migration placed on local public infrastructure, healthcare facilities, and regional housing markets.

==== Law enforcement ====
Porter supported progressive criminal justice reform. She voted against a March 2021 measure to condemn the "defund the police" movement.

==== LGBTQ rights ====
Porter was a co-sponsor of the Equality Act. In 2019 and 2021, she voted in favor of H.R. 5, which passed in the House, but failed in the Senate.

On January 13, 2022, Porter urged the Food and Drug Administration to end a policy that prevented sexually active gay and bisexual men from giving blood donations. In 2022, Porter supported and voted in favor for the Respect for Marriage Act.

==== Workers rights ====
In 2023, Porter joined writers in solidarity on the picket line during the WGA strike at the Culver Studios in Los Angeles. Addressing the crowd Porter said, "One of the things I love about this movement is that you guys are in it to stand up to corporate power and set an example for all of your brothers and sisters who are workers, who are unionized, and who are struggling to have labor rights." While speaking to Deadline Hollywood, Porter stated that "corporations are using innovation and technology as an excuse to bust unions, and it's absolutely unacceptable,... So this strike is about the entertainment industry, but it's also about so much more." Porter also joined the SAG-AFTRA, WGA picket line outside Paramount Studios in August 2023. She said, "I'm here today to stand with the SAG-AFTRA workers to listen and to learn from them and to make it clear that workers have the right to bargain."

=== Healthcare ===
Porter is a consistent supporter of Medicare for All. The platform drew criticism from fiscal conservatives and healthcare economists, who argued that her single-payer model lacked a realistic funding structure, and that it would require substantial tax increases on middle-class families.

In March 2019, Porter introduced the "Help America Run Act" (H.R.1623), a bill that would allow people running for the House or Senate to use campaign contributions to pay for healthcare premiums, elder care, child care, and dependent care. Integrity watchdogs criticized the bill, asserting that allowing candidates to pay for personal everyday living expenses out of campaign donor pools created profound conflicts of interest and blurred ethical lines regarding the personal use of political funds. The bill passed the House in October 2019 but was not taken up by the Senate.

In 2020, Porter accused UnitedHealth of "putting profits before patients and providers" during the COVID-19 pandemic. Porter sent a congressional letter to UnitedHealth Group CEO David Wichmann, accusing the healthcare provider of reducing their provider networks and decrease reimbursement rates.

In 2020, Porter voted for the No-Surprise Act, which prohibited medical providers from billing patients for costs denied by insurance companies.

In an interview with Yahoo Finance in 2022, Porter criticized pharmaceutical companies for investing more money in stock buybacks than in research and development. She also addressed the high price of pharmaceuticals, saying, "Everybody should want us to have innovative care, but it doesn't do any good to develop those drugs if they're priced out of reach." Porter stated that "there is simply no set of facts that supports that allowing the government to negotiate drug prices would reduce innovation" and that the government should have the power to negotiate drug prices and it would help create a more competitive market.

=== Governance ===
==== Judiciary ====
Porter has supported instituting more-stringent codes of conduct for the U.S. Supreme Court justices. In 2023,she partnered with the progressive judicial reform advocacy organization Demand Justice, an organization devoted to court reform and expansion, during a statewide bus tour where Porter attended and put her support behind legislation that would expand the court to 13 justices. During the tour, Porter explicitly endorsed legislative frameworks to expand the number of Supreme Court seats from nine to thirteen.

Her endorsement drew criticism from legal scholars, moderate Democrats, and conservative organizations, who argued that expanding the bench for partisan purposes would destabilize the separation of powers and severely erode public trust in the independence of the judiciary.

==== Trump impeachments ====
Porter voted for both the first and second impeachments of Donald Trump. In an interview with the Santa Barbara Independent, Porter talked about the reasons for her decisions. She stated that "Trump has repeatedly broken the law and put his personal interest and his political interest ahead of this country's interest."

==== Campaign finance ====
Since 2018, Porter has not accepted direct campaign donations from corporate political action committees. She supported H.R.1 through the House of Representatives, which would undo the Supreme Court's Citizens United decision.

Her fundraising stance became a point of contention during her 2024 Senate primary campaign, drawing criticism from political opponents and media analysts who questioned the consistency of her messaging. Financial audits of her campaigns revealed that while Porter banned direct corporate PAC checks, her committees accepted over $166,000 in indirect contributions routed through Democratic leadership PACs that were themselves funded by corporate entities. Her primary rival, Representative Adam Schiff, countered her attacks regarding his use of special-interest money by demonstrating that his leadership committees had transferred $54,675 directly into Porter's earlier, House campaigns, meaning she had historically benefited from the corporate-backed fundraising infrastructure she opposed. Additionally, independent fact-checkers noted that despite her anti-corporate rhetoric, Porter routinely accepted large individual campaign contributions directly from corporate executives and wealthy corporate board members within the pharmaceutical and banking industries.

==== Withdrawal of Biden ====
After the June 2024 presidential debate, Porter said that the White House "clearly fumbled" with its response to the fallout from President Biden's debate performance. In an interview with CNN, Jake Tapper asked Porter, if Biden was capable of holding an hour and a half press conference. Porter responded by saying, "Like most Americans, I actually don't have that information", she also stated that she hadn't personally seen the president in about a year. Porter suggested that a change in direction could include a change in advisers or a change in campaign strategy.

=== Foreign policy ===
==== Azerbaijan ====
In February 2023, Porter, on the House floor, called for the Biden administration to immediately end the blockade of Nagorno-Karabakh and to end all U.S. military assistance to Azerbaijan. She stated, "American taxpayers shouldn't be subsidizing Azerbaijan's constant aggression against the Armenian people." Porter also stated "Azerbaijan's goal is clear: to force the ethnic Armenians of Artsakh from their homeland by imposing conditions that make life impossible. We must hold Azerbaijan accountable for its aggression."

==== Middle East ====
===== Syria =====
In 2023, Porter voted against H.Con.Res. 21, which would have directed President Joe Biden to remove U.S. troops from Syria within 180 days. The resolution was defeated in the House by a wide 103–321 margin, with opponents warning that an immediate troop withdrawal would destabilize the region and allow the Islamic State to reorganize.

===== Israeli–Palestinian conflict =====
In December 2023, Porter called for a bilateral ceasefire in the Gaza war after Hamas releases all of its hostages and Hamas is removed "from operational control of Gaza," and blamed Hamas for the "shortages of food, clean water, fuel and medicine" over the years in Gaza.

=== Environment ===
Porter is a supporter of the Green New Deal.

Porter has been a supporter of the National Park Service's Every Kid Outdoors program. In 2021, Porter pushed for additional funding for the program to increase children's access to national parks. She endorsed the Biden administration's 2023 "America the Beautiful" initiative.

In September 2023, during an interview with Fox 5 San Diego, Porter stated, "California is going to need to continue to have an 'all of the above' energy approach but we're also going to need to make that transition,... And as we do, the question is can we make sure as we transition, slowly, away from fossil fuels to greener energy that we don't leave any workers behind."

In February 2024 during her Senate campaign, in a debate, Porter called for decommissioning the Diablo Canyon Power Plant. The drew criticism from some scientists and unions, who argued that premature closure could harm grid stability and increase natural gas usage.

== Electoral history ==
=== 2018 ===
2018 California's 45th congressional district election
Primary election
Party	Candidate	Votes	%
Republican	Mimi Walters (incumbent)	86,764	51.7
Democratic	Katie Porter	34,078	20.3
Democratic	Dave Min	29,979	17.8
Democratic	Brian Forde	10,107	6.0
No party preference	John Graham	3,817	2.3
Democratic	Kia Hamadanchy	3,212	1.9
Total votes		167,957	100.0
General election
Democratic	Katie Porter	158,906	52.1
Republican	Mimi Walters (incumbent)	146,383	47.9
Total votes		305,289	100.0
Democratic gain from Republican			

=== 2020 ===
California's 45th congressional district, 2020
Primary election
Party	Candidate	Votes	%
Democratic	Katie Porter (incumbent)	112,986	50.8
Republican	Greg Raths	39,942	17.9
Republican	Don Sedgwick	28,465	12.8
Republican	Peggy Huang	24,780	11.1
Republican	Lisa Sparks	8,861	4.0
Republican	Christopher J. Gonzales	5,443	2.4
Republican	Rhonda Furin	2,140	1.0
Total votes		222,617	100.0
General election
Democratic	Katie Porter (incumbent)	221,843	53.5
Republican	Greg Raths	193,096	46.5
Total votes		414,939	100.0
Democratic hold			

=== 2022 ===
California's 47th congressional district, 2022
Primary election
Party	Candidate	Votes	%
Democratic	Katie Porter (incumbent)	86,742	51.7
Republican	Scott Baugh	51,776	30.9
Republican	Amy Phan West	13,949	8.3
Republican	Brian Burley	11,952	7.1
Republican	Errol Webber	3,342	2.0
Total votes		167,761	100.0
General election
Democratic	Katie Porter (incumbent)	137,332	51.7
Republican	Scott Baugh	128,209	48.3
Total votes		265,541	100.0

=== 2024 ===
2024 United States Senate election in California Regular blanket primary
Party	Candidate	Votes	%
Democratic	Adam Schiff	2,304,829	31.57%
Republican	Steve Garvey	2,301,351	31.52%
Democratic	Katie Porter	1,118,429	15.32%
Democratic	Barbara Lee	717,129	9.82%
Republican	Eric Early	242,055	3.32%
Republican	James Bradley	98,778	1.35%
Democratic	Christina Pascucci	61,998	0.85%
Republican	Sharleta Bassett	54,884	0.75%
Republican	Sarah Sun Liew	38,718	0.53%
No party preference	Laura Garza	34,529	0.47%
Republican	Jonathan Reiss	34,400	0.47%
Democratic	Sepi Gilani	34,316	0.47%
Libertarian	Gail Lightfoot	33,295	0.46%
Republican	Denice Gary-Pandol	25,649	0.35%
Republican	James Macauley	23,296	0.32%
Democratic	Harmesh Kumar	21,624	0.30%
Democratic	David Peterson	21,170	0.29%
Democratic	Douglas Pierce	19,458	0.27%
No party preference	Major Singh	17,092	0.23%
Democratic	John Rose	14,627	0.20%
Democratic	Perry Pound	14,195	0.19%
Democratic	Raji Rab	13,640	0.19%
No party preference	Mark Ruzon	13,488	0.18%
American Independent	Forrest Jones	13,140	0.18%
Republican	Stefan Simchowitz	12,773	0.17%
Republican	Martin Veprauskas	9,795	0.13%
No party preference	Don Grundmann	6,641	0.09%
No party preference	Michael Dilger (write-in)	7	0.00%
Republican	Carlos Guillermo Tapia (write-in)	5	0.00%
No party preference	John Dowell (write-in)	3	0.00%
Republican	Danny Fabricant (write-in)	3	0.00%
Total votes		7,301,317	100.0%

Results by county Schiff: 20–30%; 30–40%; 40–50%; Garvey: 30–40%; 40–50%; 50–60%; 60–70%

2024 United States Senate election in California Special blanket primary
Party	Candidate	Votes	%
Republican	Steve Garvey	2,455,115	33.25%
Democratic	Adam Schiff	2,160,171	29.25%
Democratic	Katie Porter	1,272,684	17.24%
Democratic	Barbara Lee	866,551	11.74%
Republican	Eric Early	451,274	6.11%
Democratic	Christina Pascucci	109,867	1.49%
Democratic	Sepi Gilani	68,497	0.93%
No party preference	Michael Dilger (write-in)	27	0.00%
Total votes		7,384,186	100.0%

=== 2026 ===
2026 California gubernatorial election blanket primary
Party	Candidate	Votes	%
Democratic	Xavier Becerra	2,591,857	27.98
Republican	Steve Hilton	2,277,318	24.59
Democratic	Tom Steyer	2,110,707	22.79
Republican	Chad Bianco	941,708	10.17
Democratic	Katie Porter	403,908	4.36
Democratic	Matt Mahan	327,537	3.54
Democratic	Antonio Villaraigosa	104,107	1.12
Democratic	Tony Thurmond	63,762	0.69
Peace and Freedom	Ramsey Robinson	51,803	0.56
Democratic	Betty Yee (withdrawn)	40,873	0.44
Democratic	Eric Swalwell (withdrawn)	28,164	0.30
Republican	Tim Nelson	23,712	0.26
Green	Butch Ware (write-in)	22,493	0.24
Republican	Randeep S. Dhillon	21,937	0.24
Democratic	Barack D. Obama Shaw	16,716	0.18
Democratic	Carolina Buhler	15,013	0.16
Republican	Leo Samuel Zacky	14,708	0.16
Republican	Gretha Solórzano	12,563	0.14
Democratic	Matthew Chase Levy	11,059	0.12
Libertarian	Tom Woodard (withdrawn)	9,328	0.10
Democratic	Erin "Zez" Zezulak	9,251	0.10
Democratic	Louis A. De Barraicua	8,851	0.10
Democratic	Mohammad Arif	8,458	0.09
Republican	Leo Naranjo IV	8,099	0.09
No party preference	Nancy D. Young	7,012	0.08
Republican	James Athans Jr.	6,633	0.07
No party preference	Joseph Cabrera	6,196	0.07
Republican	David Zickefoose	5,882	0.06
Democratic	Satish Rao	5,668	0.06
No party preference	Christine R. Sarmiento	5,643	0.06
No party preference	Jon Henderson	5,589	0.06
Republican	Alicia Olivia Lapp	5,370	0.06
No party preference	Amanda Martin	5,234	0.06
No party preference	Frederic C. Schultz	5,230	0.06
Republican	Rafael M. Hernandez	5,223	0.06
Democratic	Scott P. Shields	5,043	0.05
Democratic	Derek Grasty	4,994	0.05
Democratic	Larry Azevedo	4,675	0.05
No party preference	Elaine Culotti	4,483	0.05
Republican	Patricia De Luca Basualdo	4,064	0.04
No party preference	Mauro Alberto Orozco	4,052	0.04
Democratic	Raji Rab	3,606	0.04
Democratic	Sophia Edum-a-Sam	3,550	0.04
No party preference	Brent Maupin	3,132	0.03
Democratic	Akinyemi Agbede	3,037	0.03
No party preference	Lewis Herms	2,995	0.03
No party preference	Naomi Bar-Lev	2,744	0.03
No party preference	Daniel Mercuri	2,667	0.03
Republican	Ché Ahn (write-in)	2,419	0.03
Democratic	Gary Howard Kidgell	2,415	0.03
Democratic	Joel E. Jacob	2,350	0.03
Democratic	Thunder Parley	2,320	0.03
No party preference	Margaret Trowe	2,286	0.02
No party preference	LivingForGod AndCountry DeMott	2,206	0.02
No party preference	Reza Safarnejad	1,990	0.02
No party preference	Duane Terrence Loynes Jr.	1,905	0.02
No party preference	Don J. Grundmann	1,903	0.02
No party preference	Anne Komarovsk	1,535	0.02
No party preference	Dawit Kellel	1,360	0.01
No party preference	Sam Sandak	1,222	0.01
No party preference	Max Fomin	842	0.01
No party preference	Lukasz Adam Filinski	527	0.01
No party preference	Serge Fiankan	488	0.01
No party preference	Sean Forbes (write-in)	22	0.00
Democratic	Jibri J. Peavy (write-in)	10	0.00
No party preference	Dirk Langer (write-in)	8	0.00
Democratic	Kalid Meky (write-in)	5	0.00
No party preference	Michael J. Dilger (write-in)	1	0.00
Total votes		9,262,468	100.00

== Personal life ==
Porter married Matthew Hoffman, with whom she has three children, in 2003. Porter filed for divorce in 2013. Their divorce was contentious, resulting in a court mandate requiring both parties to enroll in anger management courses. Porter said that Hoffman was both physically and verbally abusive toward her, while he accused her of pouring steaming hot boiling potatoes on his head. She requested and received a protective order against Hoffman in 2013. Hoffman relocated outside of California, leaving Porter as the primary caregiver for their children.

Utilizing an exclusive below-market housing assistance program of the university, Porter purchased in 2011 and lives in a four-bedroom residence on the University of California, Irvine, campus. UC Irvine has a faculty and staff housing community, University Hills, that was designed as "a way to compensate for high Orange County housing costs that can keep a recruit from accepting a job at the university". Porter's residence's price was $523,000, a below-market price in an area with a median home price of $1.3 million. Porter stopped teaching in 2018 after being elected to Congress, but was continually granted consecutive no-pay leaves of absence by a university administrator who was also a campaign donor. The university then continually granted Porter no-pay leave, allowing her to keep her residence on campus during her congressional tenure. This open-ended leave extension allowed her to retain the low-cost campus residence for nearly four years during her congressional career, drawing criticism for bypassing a university housing waitlist of over 250 active educators.

A post-marriage relationship with a live-in boyfriend, Julian Willis, ended when she obtained a restraining order after accusing him of digital harassment and image-harm threats, to keep him away from Porter, her home, and her children. Willis strongly denied the allegations, and filed cross-complaints with the University of California Irvine Police Department that claimed Porter was the primary aggressor, and that she had exhibited violent behavior within the household.

The Pew Research Center reported in 2023 that Porter is an Episcopalian.

== Publications ==
=== Books ===
- Modern Consumer Law (Aspen Publishing, May 27, 2016) ISBN 978-1-4548-6085-3.
- The Law of Debtors and Creditors: Text, Cases, and Problems (8th ed.). (Aspen Publishers. November 1, 2020) ISBN 978-1-4548-9351-6. (Co-authored with Jay Westbrook, Elizabeth Warren, John Pottow)
- Broke: How Debt Bankrupts the Middle Class (Stanford University Press, 2012) ISBN 978-0-8047-7700-1
- I Swear: Politics Is Messier Than My Minivan (Crown, April 11, 2023) ISBN 978-0-593-44398-9

=== Articles ===
- 'No Money Down' Bankruptcy (March 1, 2017). 'Foohey, Pamela and Lawless, Robert M. and Porter, Katherine M. and Thorne, Deborah, Southern California Law Review, 2017, Forthcoming, UC Irvine School of Law Research Paper No. 2017-12, University of Illinois College of Law Legal Studies Research Paper No. 17-19.
- Cracking the Code: An Empirical Analysis of Consumer Bankruptcy Outcomes, 101 Minnesota Law Review 1031–1098 (2017) (with Sara Greene and Parina Patel).
- Katherine Porter, The Complaint Conundrum: Thoughts on the CFPB's Complaint Mechanism, 7 Brook. J. Corp. Fin. & Com. L. (2012).
- "Did Bankruptcy Reform Fail? An Empirical Study of Consumer Debtors." Katherine Porter et al., co-authors. Am. Bankr. L. J. 82, no. 3 (2008): 349–405.

== See also ==
- List of Harvard University politicians
- Women in the United States House of Representatives
- Progressivism in the United States

U.S. House of Representatives
Preceded by Mimi Walters	Member of the U.S. House of Representatives from California's 45th congressional district 2019–2023	Succeeded by Michelle Steel
Preceded by Alan Lowenthal	Member of the U.S. House of Representatives from California's 47th congressional district 2023–2025	Succeeded by Dave Min
U.S. order of precedence (ceremonial)
Preceded by Paul Cook as Former U.S. Representative	Order of precedence of the United States as Former U.S. Representative	Succeeded by Mark Kennedy as Former U.S. Representative
