= Hans Keirstead =

Canadian medical scientist (born 1967)

Personal details
- Born: April 21, 1967 (age 59) Halifax, Canada
- Party: Democratic
- Education: University of British Columbia (BS, MS, PhD); University of Cambridge
- Awards: Donald Bren Professorship in Medicine and Biological Sciences; 2001 For his pioneering work in neuroscience and regenerative medicine. Lou Ruvo Brain Health Prize; 2009 In recognition of his advancements in understanding neurodegenerative diseases. Stem Cell Innovator of the Year Award; 2013 For his breakthrough contributions in stem cell therapy, particularly in spinal cord injury and ALS research. Health Care Visionary Award; 2015 For his leadership in stem cell research and biotechnology innovation. and more

Hans Keirstead is a medical scientist and entrepreneur specializing in stem cell research.

== Early life and education ==
Keirstead received his Ph.D. from the University of British Columbia, winning the Cameron Award for the best Ph.D. thesis in the country, with his thesis constituting the first demonstration of functional regeneration of the injured adult spinal cord. He went on to complete four years of post-doctoral studies at the University of Cambridge, where he was the youngest person elected to two senior academic posts, Fellow of the Governing Body of Downing College and Senate Member of the University of Cambridge.

== Career ==
In 2000, Keirstead left his position at the University of British Columbia, where his spinal cord research had been funded by Rick Hansen's charitable foundation. He joined the Reeve-Irvine Research Center at the University of California, Irvine School of Medicine.

Keirstead has advised U.S. senators and members of Congress on health care and biotechnology. He testified on the state's biotech industry to the California State Senate in 2002 amidst a national debate about stem cell laws and policy in the United States.

In 2004, Keirstead publicly supported California Proposition 71, which aimed to authorize three billion dollars for stem cell research for a newly created California Institute for Regenerative Medicine. During the debate he released a video of how he could restore mobility to paralyzed rats using his stem cell research. Keirstead was criticized at the time, because the procedure had yet to be published in a peer-reviewed journal, but it subsequently published the following year in The Journal of Neuroscience. The procedure was reproduced by three other labs by 2006, confirming that cells engineered to make myelin can help restore damaged areas of the spinal cord.

Keirstead was professor of anatomy and neurobiology and professor of neurological surgery at the University of California, Irvine School of Medicine for fifteen years, where he was awarded over $16 million in grants and founded the Sue and Bill Gross Stem Cell Research Center. In his academic career, he mentored more than 100 students and published more than 100 manuscripts.

He launched medical research startup companies in Orange County and is currently CEO at AIVITA Biomedical. Other corporate affiliations include Neuron Therapeutics, Inc., Caladrius Biosciences, Inc., Lifeline Cell Technology, LLC, International Stem Cell Corporation, NeoStem Oncology, LLC, Ekso Bionics Holdings, Inc., and ALPHAEON Corporation.

He has developed new treatments for cancer and for neurological injuries, and has been granted over 20 patents.

In 2010, Geron Corporation began the world's first clinical trial of human embryonic stem cell treatment for spinal cord injuries, based on the research of Keirstead's team at UC Irvine. However, the trials ended after a year due to lack of funds.

In 2013, Keirstead took a leave of absence from UC Irvine to conduct tests in the private sector. He joined California Stem Cell, Inc., also based in Irvine, as its president and CEO. His first focus after the leave of absence was trials for targeting skin cancer cells using stem cells from the cancer itself to train the immune system.

In 2014, he sold a stem-cell company in a deal worth $124 million.

In 2016, Keirstead founded AIVITA Biomedical, a private biotechnology company focused on cancer and developing a treatment that is proving to be the most effective to ever reach the final phase of clinical trials. Since its inception, the company began four clinical trials in multiple countries to test its cancer vaccine technology in glioblastoma, ovarian cancer and melanoma. Additionally, AIVITA is beginning trials of its COVID-19 vaccine candidate, AV-COVID-19.

Using the same stem cell technology, Keirstead became the first person to transform stem cells into a product that improves the appearance of facial skin. After discovering this new application, Keirstead helped AIVITA launch a skin care line called ROOT OF SKIN, which became available in Japan in 2019 after successful clinical trials. The proceeds from all ROOT OF SKIN sales are directed towards AIVITA’s cancer research programs.

Keirstead announced in June 2017 that he would run for Congress as a Democrat, challenging a seat held by Dana Rohrabacher in California's 48th congressional district. In a 2018 interview with ABILITY Magazine, Keirstead said "We don’t have anyone [in Washington] with a broad, deep understanding of the healthcare system, for example, not a one. 435 members, and there’s no one there with a broad, deep understanding of what is 20 percent of our economy. We need that." He conceded the Democratic Party primary to Harley Rouda on Sunday, June 24, 2018 after a very close race. His campaign appears to have been targeted by a cyberattack.

== Personal life ==
His wife, Niki, is a neuroscientist specializing in Alzheimer's disease. They have one son.

Keirstead has a third-degree black belt in Taekwondo. He owns and flies his own helicopter.
