= California's 47th congressional district =

U.S. House district for California

Coordinates: 33°46′59″N 117°53′57″W

- Interactive map of district boundaries
- Representative: Dave Min; D–Irvine
- Population (2025): 751,614
- Median household income: $133,805
- Ethnicity: 50.2% White; 24.8% Asian; 17.3% Hispanic; 5.3% Two or more races; 1.5% Black; 0.6% other
- Cook PVI: D+3

California's 47th congressional district is a congressional district in the U.S. state of California.

Following the 2020 redistricting cycle, the district shifted to Orange County to contain Irvine, Huntington Beach, Costa Mesa, Newport Beach, and Seal Beach. It is currently represented by Democrat Dave Min.

== Competitiveness ==
The district, a Democratic-leaning swing district with a Cook Partisan Voting Index of D+3, includes the heavily Democratic city of Irvine, and Republican-leaning coastal cities such as Huntington Beach and Newport Beach.

=== Recent election results from statewide races ===
Year	Office	Results
2008	President	Obama 51% - 49%
2010	Governor	Whitman 58% - 37%
2010	Lt. Governor	Maldonado 49% - 39%
2010	Secretary of State	Dunn 55% - 38%
2010	Attorney General	Cooley 61% - 31%
2010	Treasurer	Walters 52% - 40%
2010	Controller	Strickland 54% - 37%
2012	President	Romney 54% - 46%
2014	Governor	Kashkari 56% - 44%
2016	President	Clinton 51% - 43%
2018	Governor	Newsom 52% - 48%
2018	Attorney General	Becerra 53% - 47%
2020	President	Biden 54% - 43%
2022	Senate (Reg.)	Padilla 51% - 49%
2022	Governor	Dahle 50.3% - 49.7%
2022	Lt. Governor	Kounalakis 50.3% - 49.7%
2022	Secretary of State	Bernosky 50.05% - 49.95%
2022	Attorney General	Hochman 51% - 49%
2022	Treasurer	Guerrero 52% - 48%
2022	Controller	Chen 55% - 45%
2024	President	Harris 50% - 46%
2024	Senate (Reg.)	Garvey 50.2% - 49.8%
2025	Proposition 50	Yes 54% - 46%

== Composition ==
FIPS County Code	County	Seat	Population
59	Orange	Santa Ana	3,135,755

Under the 2020 redistricting, California's 38th congressional district is located in Southern California, covering the South Coast Metro area of Orange County. It includes the cities of Costa Mesa, Irvine, Seal Beach, Huntington Beach, Newport Beach, Laguna Beach; and parts of Laguna Hills and Laguna Woods.

Orange County is split between this district, the 45th district, the 46th district, the 40th district, and the 49th district. The 47th, 45th and 46th are partitioned by Highway 405, Old Ranch Parkway, Seal Beach Blvd, St Cloud Dr, Montecito Rd, Rossmoor Center Way, 12240 Seal Beach Blvd-Los Alamitos Army Airfield, Bolsa Chica Channel, Rancho Rd, Harold Pl, Springdale St, 6021 Anacapa Dr-Willow Ln, Edward St, Bolsa Ave, Goldenwest St, McFadden Ave, Union Pacific Railroad, 15241 Cascade Ln-15241 Cedarwood Ave, Highway 39, Edinger Ave, Newland St, Heil Ave, Magnolia St, Warner Ave, Garfield Ave, the Santa Ana River, MacArthur Blvd, Harbor Blvd, Sunflower Ave, Costa Mesa Freeway, E Alton Parkway, and Red Hill Ave.

The 47th, 40th and 49th are partitioned by Barranca Parkway, Jamboree Rd, Warner Ave, Harvard Ave, Myford Rd, Highway 5, Loma Ridge Nature Preserve, Bee Canyon Access Rd, Portola Parkway, Highway 133, Highway 241, Bake Parkway, San Diego Freeway, Ridge Route Dr, Moulton Parkway, Santa Maria Ave, Via Vista, Alta Vis, Santa Vittoria Dr, Avenida del Sol, Punta Alta, Galle Azul, Bahia Blanca W, Laguna Coast Wilderness Park, Highway S18, Aliso & Wood Canyons, Vista del Sol, Highway 1, Stonington Rd, Virginia Way, 7th Ave, and Laguna Beach.

=== Cities and CDPs with 10,000 or more people ===
- Irvine - 307,670
- Huntington Beach - 198,711
- Costa Mesa - 111,918
- Newport Beach - 85,239
- Laguna Hills – 31,374
- Seal Beach - 25,242
- Laguna Beach - 23,032
- Laguna Woods – 17,192

== List of members representing the district ==
Member	Party	Dates	Cong ress(es)	Electoral history	Counties
District created January 3, 1993
Christopher Cox (Newport Beach)	Republican	January 3, 1993 – January 3, 2003	103rd 104th 105th 106th 107th	Redistricted from the 40th district and re-elected in 1992. Re-elected in 1994. Re-elected in 1996. Re-elected in 1998. Re-elected in 2000. Redistricted to the 48th district.	1993–2003; South-Central Orange
Loretta Sanchez (Anaheim)	Democratic	January 3, 2003 – January 3, 2013	108th 109th 110th 111th 112th	Redistricted from the 46th district and re-elected in 2002. Re-elected in 2004. Re-elected in 2006. Re-elected in 2008. Re-elected in 2010. Redistricted to the 46th district.	2003–2013 Central Orange (Anaheim, Garden Grove, Santa Ana)
Alan Lowenthal (Long Beach)	Democratic	January 3, 2013 – January 3, 2023	113th 114th 115th 116th 117th	Elected in 2012. Re-elected in 2014. Re-elected in 2016. Re-elected in 2018. Re-elected in 2020. Redistricted to the 42nd district and retired.	2013–2023 Orange and Los Angeles (Long Beach)
Katie Porter (Irvine)	Democratic	January 3, 2023 – January 3, 2025	118th	Redistricted from the 45th district and re-elected in 2022. Retired to run for U.S. senator.	2023–present: Coastal Orange (Irvine, Laguna Beach, Costa Mesa, Newport Beach, Huntington Beach, and Seal Beach)
Dave Min (Irvine)	Democratic	January 3, 2025 – present	119th	Elected in 2024. Re-elected in 2026.	2023–present: Coastal Orange (Irvine, Laguna Beach, Costa Mesa, Newport Beach, Huntington Beach, and Seal Beach)

== Election results ==
=== 1992 ===
1992 United States House of Representatives elections in California
Party	Candidate	Votes	%
Republican	Chris Cox (Incumbent)	165,004	64.9
Democratic	John F. Anwiler	76,924	30.3
Peace and Freedom	Maxine Bell Quirk	12,297	4.8
Independent	Barry Charles (write-in)	32	0.0
Total votes		244,257	100.0
Republican hold			

=== 1994 ===
1994 United States House of Representatives elections in California
Party	Candidate	Votes	%
Republican	Chris Cox (Incumbent)	154,071	71.7
Democratic	Gary Kingsbury	53,669	25.0
Libertarian	Victor A. Wagner, Jr.	7,257	3.3
Total votes		214,997	100.0
Republican hold			

=== 1996 ===
1996 United States House of Representatives elections in California
Party	Candidate	Votes	%
Republican	Chris Cox (Incumbent)	160,078	65.7
Democratic	Tina Laine	70,362	28.9
Natural Law	Iris Adam	6,573	2.8
Libertarian	Victor Wagner	6,530	2.6
Total votes		243,777	100.0
Republican hold			

=== 1998 ===
1998 United States House of Representatives elections in California
Party	Candidate	Votes	%
Republican	Chris Cox (Incumbent)	132,711	67.6
Democratic	Christina Avalos	57,938	29.5
Libertarian	Victor A. Wagner, Jr.	2,991	1.5
Reform	Raymond O. Mills	1,369	0.7
Natural Law	Paul Fisher	1,307	0.7
Total votes		196,316	100.0
Republican hold			

=== 2000 ===
2000 United States House of Representatives elections in California
Party	Candidate	Votes	%
Republican	Chris Cox (Incumbent)	181,365	65.7
Democratic	John Graham	83,186	30.1
Libertarian	David F. Nolan	8,081	2.9
Natural Law	Iris Adam	3,769	1.3
Total votes		276,401	100.0
Republican hold			

=== 2002 ===
2002 United States House of Representatives elections in California
Party	Candidate	Votes	%
Democratic	Loretta Sanchez (Incumbent)	42,501	60.6
Republican	Jeff Chavez	24,346	34.7
Libertarian	Paul Marsden	2,944	4.2
Independent	Kenneth M. Valenzuela-Fisher (write-in)	382	0.5
Independent	Michael J. Monge (write-in)	5	0.0
Total votes		70,178	100.0
Democratic hold			

=== 2004 ===
2004 United States House of Representatives elections in California
Party	Candidate	Votes	%
Democratic	Loretta Sanchez (Incumbent)	65,684	60.4
Republican	Alexandria A. "Alex" Coronado	43,099	39.6
Total votes		108,783	100.0
Democratic hold			

=== 2006 ===
2006 United States House of Representatives elections in California
Party	Candidate	Votes	%
Democratic	Loretta Sanchez (Incumbent)	47,134	62.4
Republican	Tan D. Nguyen	28,485	37.6
Total votes		75,619	100.0
Democratic hold			

=== 2008 ===
2008 United States House of Representatives elections in California
Party	Candidate	Votes	%
Democratic	Loretta Sanchez (Incumbent)	85,878	69.5
Republican	Rosemarie "Rosie" Avila	31,432	25.4
American Independent	Robert Lauten	6,274	5.1
Total votes		123,584	100.0
Democratic hold			

=== 2010 ===
2010 United States House of Representatives elections in California
Party	Candidate	Votes	%
Democratic	Loretta Sanchez (Incumbent)	50,832	53.0
Republican	Van Tran	37,679	39.3
Independent	Cecilia Igleseis	7,443	7.7
Total votes		95,954	100.0
Democratic hold			

=== 2012 ===
2012 United States House of Representatives elections in California
Party	Candidate	Votes	%
Democratic	Alan Lowenthal	130,093	56.6
Republican	Gary DeLong	99,919	43.4
Total votes		230,012	100.0
Democratic hold			

=== 2014 ===
2014 United States House of Representatives elections in California
Party	Candidate	Votes	%
Democratic	Alan Lowenthal (Incumbent)	69,061	56.0
Republican	Andy Whallon	54,309	44.0
Total votes		123,370	100.0
Democratic hold			

=== 2016 ===
2016 United States House of Representatives elections in California
Party	Candidate	Votes	%
Democratic	Alan Lowenthal (Incumbent)	154,759	63.7
Republican	Andy Whallon	88,109	36.3
Total votes		242,868	100.0
Democratic hold			

=== 2018 ===
2018 United States House of Representatives elections in California
Party	Candidate	Votes	%
Democratic	Alan Lowenthal (Incumbent)	143,354	64.9
Republican	John Briscoe	77,682	35.1
Total votes		221,036	100.0
Democratic hold			

=== 2020 ===
2020 United States House of Representatives elections in California
Party	Candidate	Votes	%
Democratic	Alan Lowenthal (incumbent)	197,028	63.3
Republican	John Briscoe	114,371	36.7
Total votes		311,399	100.0
Democratic hold			

=== 2022 ===
2022 United States House of Representatives elections in California
Party	Candidate	Votes	%
Democratic	Katie Porter (Incumbent)	137,374	51.7
Republican	Scott Baugh	128,261	48.3
Total votes		265,635	100.0
Democratic hold			

=== 2024 ===
2024 United States House of Representatives elections in California
Party	Candidate	Votes	%
Democratic	Dave Min	181,721	51.4
Republican	Scott Baugh	171,554	48.6
Total votes		353,275	100.0
Democratic hold			

== Historical district boundaries ==
=== 2003-13 ===
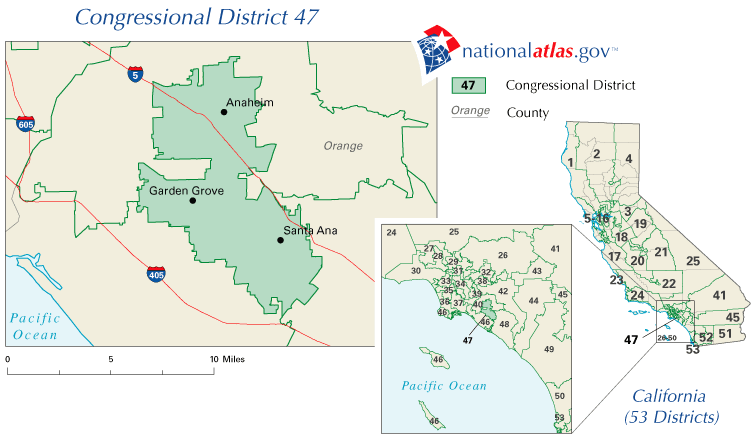
From 2003 through 2013, the district included many of Orange County's central suburbs, including Anaheim, Garden Grove and Santa Ana.

=== 2013-23 ===
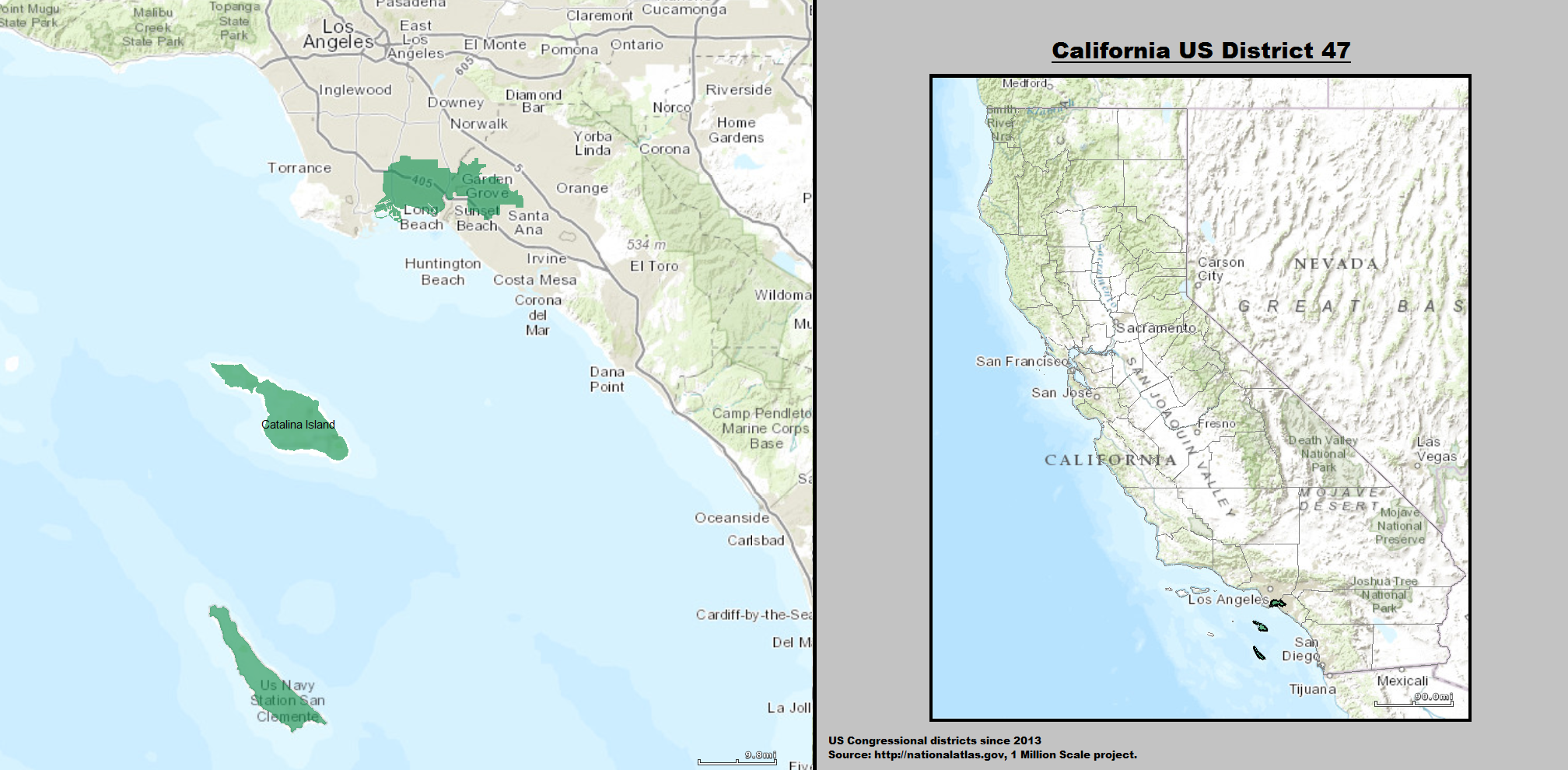
Due to redistricting after the 2010 United States census, the district moved west to parts of Los Angeles County and included Catalina and San Clemente islands. The district also retained parts of Orange County such as Garden Grove.

== In popular culture ==
California's 47th congressional district was the scene of a congressional election (won by a deceased Democrat), and later a congressional special election (won by the Republican incumbent), featured in several episodes of the political drama The West Wing. Like the real district, the fictional one from the show is in Orange County.

== See also ==
- List of United States congressional districts
- California's congressional districts
