= Chet Cooper =

American advocate for people with disabilities

- Occupations: Advocate, publisher, journalist, public speaker
- Known for: Founder of ABILITY Magazine

Chet Cooper is best known as a leading advocate for people with disabilities, most notably in the areas of education, equal employment, and housing. Cooper is the founder/creator of ABILITY Magazine, ABILITY Awareness, and JobAccess.org.

== ABILITY Magazine ==
In 1991, Cooper launched ABILITY Magazine, the first newsstand magazine focusing on issues of health and disability. Distributed by Time Warner, ABILITY Magazine is a bimonthly (6 issues annually) publication.

== ABILITY Awareness ==
In 1995, Cooper founded ABILITY Awareness, a non-profit foundation dedicated to enhancing the quality of life for people with disabilities through housing, employment, education, media and volunteer opportunities. In response to the growing population of low-income people with disabilities, Cooper created ABILITY House, a program of ABILITY Awareness. Partnering with Habitat for Humanity, ABILITY House creates accessible homes for low income persons all over the United States, including Oahu, Hawaii. ABILITY Awareness created the ABILITY Magazine Award (via Think Quest Internet Challenge), which provides scholarships to winning teams of students where one or more members have a disability.

== ABILITY Jobs - abilityjobs.com ==
=== Ability Jobs - Online job board ===
Cooper also developed abilityjobs.com (formerly JobAccess.org), an internet employment site for people with disabilities. Abilityjobs.com helps those with disabilities find jobs within companies, government and non-profit organizations. According to Cooper, eighty percent of workers with disabilities are unemployed looking at the Percent of Population in Labor Force numbers the government provides. However, many have given up searching for work after countless unsuccessful attempts. As a result, they no longer are classified as unemployed and consequently government estimates of disabled people without work is substantially less than the real number.

=== Ability Job Fair - Online career fair ===
Continuing his work to improve employment for people with disabilities, he started ABILITYJobFair.org, an online, face-to-face career fair experience for job seekers with disabilities and recruiters.

== Awards and recognitions ==
He has been honored by President George W. Bush at a private White House ceremony where he was presented with the President's Community Volunteer Award, the highest national honor bestowed upon a volunteer. Chet Cooper has further been recognized by the California Governor's Committee for "exemplary leadership in the community" and has received a special Congressional recognition for outstanding community service and the Easter Seals Awareness Award, to name a few.

== Public speaking ==
He is a member of the California Governor's Media Access board, Rosalynn Carter's Mental Health Partnership Steering Council and serves on committees for COSD (Career Opportunities for Students with Disabilities), Actors with Disabilities Showcase and LAP (Local Access Place). Cooper is a speaker and has addressed audiences on both national and local levels including serving as the keynote speaker at the President's Committee on the Employment of People with Disabilities national conference and two-time speaker at the National Community Service Conference, which was held in conjunction with the Points of Light Foundation. He has spoken in Switzerland, China (Beijing, Wuhan, Guangzhou, Hong Kong), Israel, England, Abu Dhabi, Italy, Japan, Jordan, Armenia, Qatar, and Scotland.

Chet Cooper has also spoken about the power social media has in promoting awareness for disability issues. From speaking at the UN on September 7, 2011, to organizing and moderating the first panel at the UN on disability and social media on September 13, 2012, Cooper has highlighted the tremendous influence social media platforms such as Twitter, Facebook and YouTube have.

== Personal life ==
Cooper has personally been diagnosed with ADHD and Dyslexia. Other members of his family also have disabilities. Cooper completed an undergraduate degree in biology at California Poly Tech and attended law school at Western State University.
