= Kaira Rouda =

American author

- Born: Kaira Sturdivant; May 17, 1963 (age 63); Evanston, Illinois, U.S.
- Education: Vanderbilt University (BA)
- Occupations: Author, businesswoman
- Spouse: Harley Rouda
- Children: 4
- Writing career
- Genres: Psychological suspense, women's fiction
- Website: kairarouda.com

Kaira Sturdivant Rouda (born May 17, 1963) is an American author and businesswoman. She is best known for her psychological suspense novels, including Best Day Ever and All the Difference. Her novel, The Favorite Daughter, was released in May 2019.

== Early life and education ==
Kaira Sturdivant was born on May 17, 1963, in Evanston, Illinois, to Patricia Ann Robinson Sturdivant, a community volunteer from Santa Cruz, California, and Frederick David Sturdivant, a retired professor and management consultant from San Jose, California.

Rouda earned a Bachelor of Arts in English, magna cum laude, from Vanderbilt University in 1985.

== Career ==
In the early-1990s, Rouda began her career as a reporter for Business First newspaper, a member of the American City Business Journals chain. She later worked as an account executive for Fahlgren & Swink, a regional advertising agency, before assuming the role of vice president of marketing at Stanley Steemer in 1995.

In 2002, she created the Columbus, Ohio-based franchise company, Real Living Real Estate. Built as the first female-focused residential real estate brand, Rouda grew the brand to more than 22 states before its sale to Brookfield Residential Property Services, a Toronto-based firm. The Real Living real estate franchise was eventually sold to Berkshire Hathaway.

=== Early writing career ===
As a freelance writer, Rouda has contributed articles to Columbus Monthly and Midwest Living. For ten years, she was the "Connections" columnist for This Week, a publication of The Columbus Dispatch.

Her first book was titled Real You Incorporated: 8 Essentials for Women Entrepreneurs

=== Fiction writing ===
In 2011, Rouda turned her focus to writing fiction, with an emphasis on women's fiction and domestic suspense. Her novel Best Day Ever (2017) received positive reviews from Kirkus Reviews, Book Reporter, HuffPost and The News & Observer.

Her novels include: The Favorite Daughter, In the Mirror, All the Difference, The Goodbye Year, and Here. Home. Hope.

=== Charitable and philanthropic work ===
Rouda's philanthropic efforts have focused on homelessness, food security, arts and education, and the empowerment of women and girls. She was the founder of Make Room Columbus, Central Ohio's first shelter for homeless families. She also founded the Columbus Ohio Cattlebaron's Ball for the American Cancer Society; served on the board of Central Ohio's YWCA and its capital campaign committee; and served on the first board for The Wexner Center for the Arts. She served two terms on the board of directors for the Mid-Ohio Food Bank.

Rouda relocated to Southern California in 2009. There, she became an active volunteer for her children's schools. She is a volunteer for the Boys & Girls Club of Laguna Beach, while serving on committees for the Tahirih Justice Center and Working Wardrobes/VetNet. She is a member of the Human Rights Watch Southern California board.

=== Awards ===
Rouda was listed on Entrepreneur's Fifty Fastest Growing Women-Led Businesses. Her work on Real Living earned Rouda a Stevie Award for Women in Business. She has received multiple ADDY, Webby, Telly, Communicator, Prism, and WebAwards for her marketing work.

For her civic service, Rouda has received the Ohio Sertoma Service to Mankind Award, Kiwanis Humanitarian Award and Northwest Rotary Woman of the Year award. In 1991, she was named Citizen of the Year, Columbus Board of Realtors. The following year, she earned a national Kiwanis Service to Humanity Award.

== Personal life ==
Rouda resides in Laguna Beach, California, with her husband, former U.S. Representative Harley Rouda. Rouda has four adult children.
