= United States House Oversight Subcommittee on Military and Foreign Affairs =

Subcommittee of Committee on Oversight and Government Reform
- Active United States House of Representatives; 119th Congress

Leadership
- Chair: William Timmons (R)
- Ranking Member: Suhas Subramanyam (D)

Structure
- Seats: 14 (14 currently filled) 8/8 6/6
- Political parties: Majority (8): Republican (8); Minority (6): Democratic (6)

Meeting place
- 2157, Rayburn House Office Building; Washington, D.C. 20515

Phone number
- (202)-225-5074

The Subcommittee on Military and Foreign Affairs is a subcommittee of the United States House Committee on Oversight and Government Reform. Jurisdiction includes oversight of national security, homeland security, and foreign policy. It was restructured and expanded during the 112th Congress after a committee reorganization spearheaded by full committee chairman Darrell Issa. During Democratic control from 2019 to 2023, it was known as the Subcommittee on National Security. From 2023 to 2025 it was named the Subcommittee on National Security, the Border and Foreign Affairs.

== Jurisdiction ==
The subcommittee shall have oversight jurisdiction over: national security; homeland security; foreign operations, including the relationships of the United States with other nations; immigration; defense; issues affecting veterans; and oversight and legislative jurisdiction over federal acquisition policy related to national security.

== Members, 119th Congress ==
Majority	Minority
William Timmons, South Carolina, Chair; Mike Turner, Ohio; Michael Cloud, Texas; Andy Biggs, Arizona; Byron Donalds, Florida; Anna Paulina Luna, Florida	Suhas Subramanyam, Virginia, Ranking Member; Stephen Lynch, Massachusetts; Kweisi Mfume, Maryland; Robert Garcia, California; Greg Casar, Texas
Ex officio
James Comer, Kentucky	Gerry Connolly, Virginia (until April 28, 2025); Stephen Lynch, Massachusetts (April 28–June 24, 2025)

== Historical membership rosters ==
=== 110th Congress ===
Majority	Minority
John F. Tierney, Massachusetts, Chair; Carolyn Maloney, New York; Stephen Lynch, Massachusetts; Brian Higgins, New York; John Yarmuth, Kentucky; Bruce Braley, Iowa; Betty McCollum, Minnesota; Jim Cooper, Tennessee; Chris Van Hollen, Maryland; Paul Hodes, New Hampshire; Peter Welch, Vermont; Tom Lantos, California	Christopher Shays, Connecticut, Ranking Member; Dan Burton, Indiana; John M. McHugh, New York; Todd Russell Platts, Pennsylvania; Jimmy Duncan, Tennessee; Michael Turner, Ohio; Kenny Marchant, Texas; Lynn Westmoreland, Georgia; Patrick McHenry, North Carolina; Virginia Foxx, North Carolina

=== 111th Congress ===
Majority	Minority
John F. Tierney, Massachusetts, Chair; Carolyn Maloney, New York; Patrick J. Kennedy, Rhode Island; Chris Van Hollen, Maryland; Paul Hodes, New Hampshire; Chris Murphy, Connecticut; Peter Welch, Vermont; Bill Foster, Illinois; Steve Driehaus, Ohio; Stephen Lynch, Massachusetts; Henry Cuellar, Texas; Mike Quigley, Illinois	Jeff Flake, Arizona, Ranking Member; Dan Burton, Indiana; John Mica, Florida; Jimmy Duncan, Tennessee; Mike Turner, Ohio; Lynn Westmoreland, Georgia; Patrick McHenry, North Carolina; Jim Jordan, Ohio; Jeff Fortenberry, Nebraska

=== 112th Congress ===
Majority	Minority
Jason Chaffetz, Utah, Chair; Raul Labrador, Idaho, Vice Chair; Dan Burton, Indiana; John Mica, Florida; Todd Russell Platts, Pennsylvania; Mike Turner, Ohio; Paul Gosar, Arizona; Blake Farenthold, Texas	John F. Tierney, Massachusetts, Ranking Member; Bruce Braley, Iowa; Peter Welch, Vermont; John Yarmuth, Kentucky; Stephen Lynch, Massachusetts; Mike Quigley, Illinois

=== 113th Congress ===
Majority	Minority
Jason Chaffetz, Utah, Chair; John Mica, Florida; Justin Amash, Michigan; Jimmy Duncan, Tennessee; Paul Gosar, Arizona; Trey Gowdy, South Carolina; Cynthia Lummis, Wyoming; Rob Woodall, Georgia; Kerry Bentivolio, Michigan	John F. Tierney, Massachusetts, Ranking Member; Carolyn Maloney, New York; Stephen Lynch, Massachusetts; Jackie Speier, California; Michelle Lujan Grisham, New Mexico; Peter Welch, Vermont; Robin Kelley, Illinois

=== 114th Congress ===
Majority	Minority
Ron DeSantis, Florida, Chair; John Mica, Florida; Jimmy Duncan, Tennessee; Jody Hice, Georgia; Steve Russell, Oklahoma; Will Hurd, Texas	Stephen Lynch, Massachusetts, Ranking Member; Robin Kelly, Illinois; Brenda Lawrence, Michigan; Ted Lieu, California

=== 115th Congress ===
Majority	Minority
Ron DeSantis, Florida, Chair; Steve Russell, Oklahoma; Jimmy Duncan, Tennessee; Justin Amash, Michigan; Paul Gosar, Arizona; Virginia Foxx, North Carolina; Jody Hice, Georgia; James Comer, Kentucky	Stephen Lynch, Massachusetts, Ranking Member; Peter Welch, Vermont; Val Demings, Florida; Mark DeSaulnier, California; John Sarbanes, Maryland

=== 116th Congress ===
Majority	Minority
Stephen Lynch, Massachusetts, Chair; Jim Cooper, Tennessee; Peter Welch, Vermont; Harley Rouda, California; Debbie Wasserman Schultz, Florida; Robin Kelly, Illinois; Mark DeSaulnier, California; Stacey Plaskett, U.S. Virgin Islands; Brenda Lawrence, Michigan	Jody Hice, Georgia, Ranking Member; Justin Amash, Michigan; Paul Gosar, Arizona; Virginia Foxx, North Carolina; Mark Meadows, North Carolina; Michael Cloud, Texas; Mark E. Green, Tennessee

=== 117th Congress ===
Majority	Minority
Stephen Lynch, Massachusetts, Chair; Peter Welch, Vermont; Hank Johnson, Georgia; Mark DeSaulnier, California; Kweisi Mfume, Maryland; Debbie Wasserman Schultz, Florida; Jackie Speier, California	Glenn Grothman, Wisconsin, Ranking Member; Paul Gosar, Arizona; Virginia Foxx, North Carolina; Bob Gibbs, Ohio; Clay Higgins, Louisiana

=== 118th Congress ===
Majority	Minority
Glenn Grothman, Wisconsin, Chair; Paul Gosar, Arizona; Virginia Foxx, North Carolina; Clay Higgins, Louisiana; Pete Sessions, Texas; Andy Biggs, Arizona; Nancy Mace, South Carolina; Jake LaTurner, Kansas; Pat Fallon, Texas; Kelly Armstrong, South Dakota; Scott Perry, Pennsylvania	Robert Garcia, Ranking Member; Stephen Lynch, Massachusetts; Dan Goldman, New York; Jared Moskowitz, Florida; Hank Johnson, Georgia; Alexandria Ocasio-Cortez, New York; Katie Porter, California; Cori Bush, Missouri; Maxwell Frost, Florida
Ex officio
James Comer, Kentucky	Jamie Raskin, Maryland
