= Orange County Fair =

Orange County Fair may refer to any of several large fairs throughout the United States:

- Orange County Fair (California)
- Orange County Fair (New York)
