= Ability (magazine) =

American magazine

- Editors: Managing Editor Gillian Friedman, MD Editors Paula Fitzgerald; Renne Gardner; Pamela K. Johnson; Sylvia Martirosyan; Lia Limón Martirosyan; Molly McGovern; Josh Pate, PhD; Maya Sabatello, PhD, JD; Nancy Shi Health Editors E. Thomas Chappell, MD; Larry Goldstein, MD; Moses de Graft-Johnson, MD Web Editors Alhaji Conteh; Marge Plasmier; Mary Shafizadeh
- Writers: Contributors George Covington; Ashley Fiolek; Geri Jewell; Regina Hall; Myles Mellor; Paul Pelland; Betsy Valnes; David S. Zimmerman; Danielle Zurovick, PhD Humor Writers Jeff Charlebois; George Covington, JD; Gene Feldman, JD
- Media: Multi-Media Helki Frantzen; Stanya Kahn Graphics Scott Johnson; Melissa Murphy
- Editor-in-Chief: Chet Cooper
- Transcriptionist: Sandy Grabowski
- Photographer: Nancy Villere
- Categories: Health and Disability
- Frequency: Bimonthly
- Publisher: Chet Cooper
- Founder: Chet Cooper
- Founded: 1990
- Country: United States of America
- Based in: Santa Ana and Costa Mesa, California
- Website: abilitymagazine.com
- ISSN: 1062-5321
- OCLC: 502282231

Ability is an American bimonthly magazine founded by Chet Cooper in 1990, and launched as the first newsstand magazine focused on issues of health and disability. Ability is ranked in the Top 50 Magazines in the World. It is distributed by Time Warner and has offices in Santa Ana and Costa Mesa, California.

== Content ==
Ability covers on health, environmental protection, assistive technology, employment, sports, travel, universal design, mental wellness. Magazine covers issues include the Americans with Disabilities Act, civil rights advancement, employment opportunities for people with disabilities, and human interest stories. Cover interviews consist of movie and TV celebrities, business leaders, sports figures, presidents, first ladies, and more. Each cover story of Ability showcases a public figure who either has a disability or a connection to a disability-related cause.

Ability has demonstrated accessibility by being the first to embed VOICEYE (a high-density matrix barcode system) on its editorial pages to hear print through smartphones and tablets – giving access to people with low vision, blindness or reading challenges in 58 languages.

== Representation ==
Ability frequently participates in international conferences, public awareness events and opportunities to affect policy surrounding issues of disability; and has partnered with the United Nations in efforts to raise awareness.

== Notable contributors ==
Throughout the years, many entertainers and celebrities representing important causes have been featured on the cover of Ability. Notable musicians, such as Ray Charles, Andrea Bocelli, and Avril Lavigne; and actors, such as Robert Patrick, Mary Tyler Moore, Kirk Douglas, Jack Lemmon, Laura Dern, Holly Robinson Peete, and Fran Drescher, have shared their stories with Ability. Other famous faces include actor and advocate Christopher Reeve, talk show host Montel Williams, comedian Richard Pryor, and entertainer Donny Osmond. Most recently, Joe Mantegna, Kurt Yaeger, William H. Macy, Jennifer Esposito, Bobby Farrelly, Peter Farrelly, Andy Madadian, Amy Brenneman, Howie Mandel, Kirk Douglas, Stevie Wonder, Gary Busey, Austin Basis, and Max Gail have been featured in the magazine.

Politicians featured in Ability have included President Bill Clinton, Senators Tom Harkin, Bob Dole, Chuck Grassley, Max Cleland, Harris Wofford, Congressman Jim Langevin, and First Ladies Laura Bush and Rosalynn Carter.

Issues of Ability have also included a wide array of profiles of leaders in the world of business, including Medtronic founder Earl Bakken, Kinko's CEO Paul Orfalea, and Panasonic CEO Don Iwatani, and companies that embody "best practices" including Boeing, Hewlett-Packard, Microsoft, Starbucks, and CVS Pharmacy.

== Awards ==
Ability received the 2014 Da Vinci Award for Accessibility and Universal Design.

== Affiliations ==
Ability is part of a diverse network of organizations geared toward advancement and inclusion of people with disabilities. These projects include:

- Ability Jobs: The first web-based job board and résumé bank for individuals with disabilities.
- Ability Awareness: A non-profit organization with a focus on elevating attitudes towards people with disabilities.
- Ability Corps: A major initiative fostering integration of volunteers with disabilities into community service.

Ability created an alliance with the China Press for People with Disabilities – providing the rights to publish each other's selected stories, artworks and articles, in an effort to bring both countries to experience human interest stories that otherwise would never be known.

Ability has partnered with the Arc of the United States "to raise awareness about disability issues and the resources available to people with disabilities and their families."

Ability is listed as an awareness resource by the United Cerebral Palsy organization and has provided media for the Disability Rights Legal Center.
