= Mimi Walters =

American politician (born 1962)

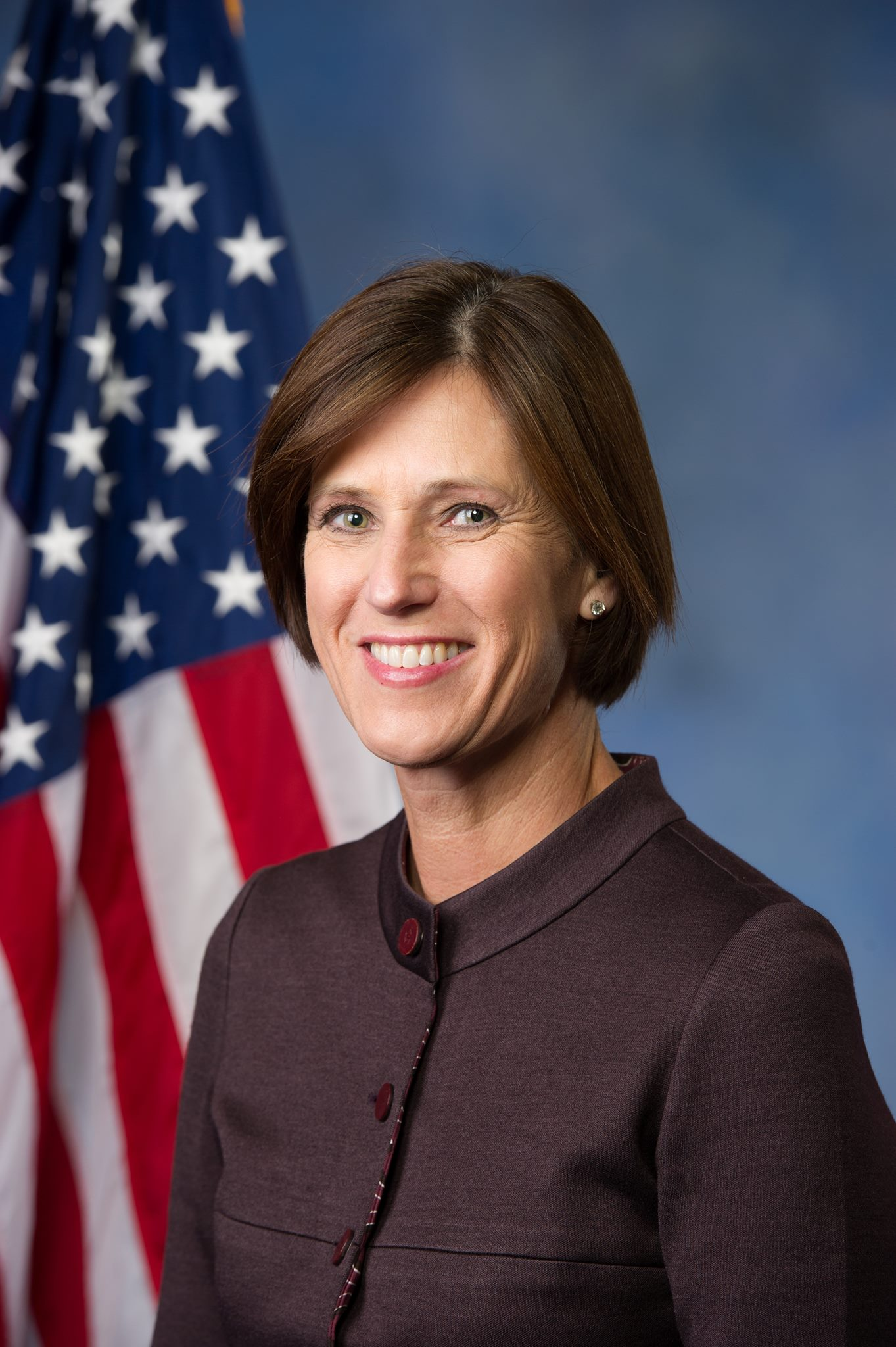
- Official portrait, 2015

Member of the U.S. House of Representatives from California's 45th district
- In office January 3, 2015 – January 3, 2019
- Preceded by: John Campbell
- Succeeded by: Katie Porter

Member of the California State Senate
- In office December 1, 2008 – January 3, 2015
- Preceded by: Dick Ackerman
- Succeeded by: John Moorlach
- Constituency: 33rd district (2008–2012); 37th district (2012–2015)

Member of the California State Assembly from the 73rd district
- In office December 6, 2004 – November 30, 2008
- Preceded by: Patricia Bates
- Succeeded by: Diane Harkey

Personal details
- Born: Marian Elaine Krogius; May 14, 1962 (age 64) Pasadena, California, U.S.
- Party: Republican
- Spouse: David Walters
- Children: 4
- Education: University of California, Los Angeles (BA)

Marian Elaine "Mimi" Walters (née Krogius; born May 14, 1962) is an American businesswoman and politician. A member of the Republican Party, she served from 2015 to 2019 as the U.S. representative for California's 45th congressional district.

Before running for office, Walters was an investment banker from 1988 to 1995, and served as chairwoman of the Laguna Niguel Investment and Banking Committee. She then served two terms on the Laguna Niguel City Council from 1996 to 2004, serving as Mayor in 2000, before representing the 73rd Assembly district in the California State Assembly from 2004 to 2008. She was subsequently elected to the California State Senate, representing the 33rd Senate district from 2008 to 2012 and the 37th Senate district from 2012 to 2015.

Walters was elected to represent California's 45th congressional district in the United States House of Representatives in 2014, and was re-elected in 2016. She ran for a third term in the 2018 mid-term elections, but was defeated by Democrat Katie Porter. After serving on Congress, Walters was a fellow at the USC Center for the Political Future in the fall of 2020.

== Early life and education ==
In 1962, Walters was born as Marian Elaine Krogius in Pasadena, California. Walters' father is Tristan Krogius. Walters graduated from Dana Hills High School (1980) before earning a Bachelor of Arts in political science from the University of California, Los Angeles in 1984.

== Career ==
Walters was an investment banker from 1988 to 1995. She was an investment executive at the firm of Drexel Burnham Lambert, and later joined the firm of Kidder, Peabody, & Co.

=== Laguna Niguel City Council ===
After serving as chair of Laguna Niguel's Investment and Banking Committee, Walters was appointed to the Laguna Niguel City Council in 1996, after the recently re-elected incumbent Thomas W. Wilson resigned to be appointed to the Orange County Board of Supervisors. Walters served as mayor in 2000, and was elected to a second term that same year.

During her time on the City Council, Walters also served on the El Toro Reuse Planning Authority, and opposed efforts to convert Marine Corps Air Station El Toro into a commercial airport.

=== California State Assembly ===
In 2004, Walters was elected to represent the 73rd Assembly District, which includes the coastal Orange and San Diego county communities of Laguna Niguel, Laguna Hills, Oceanside, Dana Point, San Clemente, San Juan Capistrano, and Aliso Viejo. Her term ran from January 2005 to January 2007. In November 2006, she was re-elected to a second term in the Assembly.

=== California State Senate ===
Walters was elected to the State Senate in November 2008.

In 2013, the California Fair Political Practices Commission cleared Walters of wrongdoing in a conflict of interest investigation "into phone calls made by her office on behalf of a company once co-owned by her husband".

=== 2010 California State Treasurer election ===
In January 2010, Walters announced that she would run for California State Treasurer against Democratic incumbent Bill Lockyer. Walters became the Republican nominee for State Treasurer, but lost to Lockyer in the general election.

=== 2012 California State Senate race ===
Democratic candidate and trial lawyer Steve Young filed an unsuccessful civil lawsuit in an attempt to keep Walters' name off of the 2012 ballot. Young's lawsuit challenged Walters' residency in the 37th District; after the California Citizens Redistricting Commission re-drew the state's legislative districts in 2011, Walters announced that she had moved from Laguna Nigel to Irvine, in order to be eligible to run in the 37th Senate District.

== U.S. House of Representatives ==
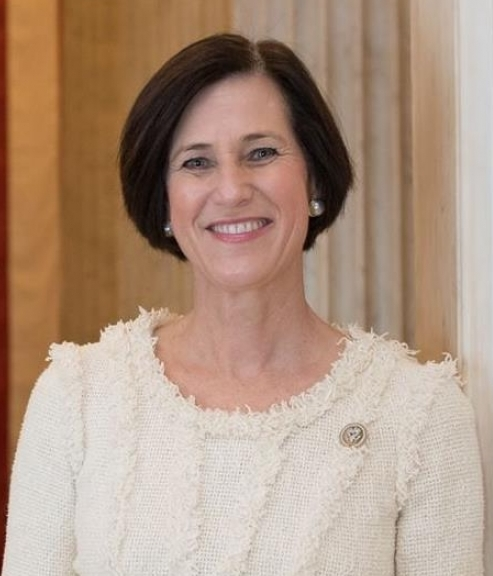
Walters during the 115th Congress

=== Elections ===
==== 2014 ====
On July 2, 2013, Walters formally announced her candidacy for Congress, to replace Congressman John B. T. Campbell III, who announced he would not be seeking another term.

She was endorsed by a number of Republican members of Congress from California, including Campbell, Kevin McCarthy, Darrell Issa, and Ed Royce. Prior to the 2014 election, she set up the Blessings of Liberty Leadership PAC.

Walters was placed in the National Republican Congressional Committee's (NRCC) "Contender" category of their "Young Guns" program. In September 2014, the NRCC named Walters along with 13 other candidates to their "Vanguard" program. In the non-partisan blanket primary, she came in first place in a field of three candidates, with 45% of the vote. In the general election, she defeated Democratic candidate Drew Leavens with 65% of the vote.

==== 2016 ====
In November 2016, Walters won re-election by 17 points over her Democratic opponent, Ron Varasteh. For the campaign, Walters raised over $2 million.

==== 2018 ====
Walters ran for re-election in 2018. She and Democrat Katie Porter advanced out of the top-two primary in June 2018. Walters and Porter, a consumer lawyer and UC Irvine law professor, faced off in the general election on November 6, 2018.

In May 2018, Politico reported that Democrats were confident they would oust Walters, given that in 2016, Hillary Clinton had carried the 45th district, writing that Walters had "backed some of the most polarizing planks of President Donald Trump's agenda", and that Walters was "upbeat about surviving the much-predicted Democratic wave". Politico noted her support for a popular November ballot referendum. "The only reason I'm a target is because Hillary Clinton won my district", said Walters. "I got 37,000 more votes than President Trump did."

In September 2018, the Congressional Leadership Fund (CLF), the largest Republican super PAC active in U.S. House races, announced a $400,000 ad buy in support of Walters' campaign. In October 2018, the Los Angeles Times reported that the CLF had not purchased advertisements for Walters in its opening round of broadcast television advertising buys in Southern California. The CLF pushed back on the Los Angeles Times report, saying they had reserved over $3 million in Walters' district and had begun advertising there in August.

At the end of election night, Walters was in the lead, but over the following days, Porter gained votes and eventually overtook Walters as more ballots were counted. In fund-raising e-mails sent to supporters, Walters made unsubstantiated claims of fraud, alleging that Democrats were seeking to "steal" her seat by tampering with votes.

On November 15, 2018, the Associated Press called the race for Porter.

=== Committee assignments ===
- Committee on the Judiciary
  - Subcommittee on Courts, Intellectual Property, and the Internet
  - Subcommittee on Regulatory Reform, Commercial and Anti-Trust Law
- Committee on Transportation and Infrastructure
  - Subcommittee on Aviation
  - Subcommittee on Highways and Transit
  - Subcommittee on Railroads, Pipelines, and Hazardous Materials
- Committee on Ethics
- Committee on Energy and Commerce
  - Subcommittee on Communications and Technology
  - Subcommittee on Consumer Protection and Commerce
  - Subcommittee on Oversight and Investigations

Caucus memberships

- Republican Main Street Partnership
- Republican Study Committee

== Political positions ==
=== Abortion ===
Walters opposed abortion, but had de-emphasized the issue during her political campaigns. In 2015, during her freshman term, she served on the United States House Select Investigative Panel on Planned Parenthood.

=== Cannabis ===
Walters had a "D" rating from the National Organization for the Reform of Marijuana Laws, an advocacy group supporting the legalization of marijuana.

=== Donald Trump ===
In July 2016, FiveThirtyEight labeled Walters an "Eager Unifier", for having endorsed Trump wholeheartedly, but not until after the Indiana primary.

In February 2017, Walters voted against a resolution that would have directed the House to request 10 years of Trump's tax returns, which would then have been reviewed by the House Ways and Means Committee in a closed session.

FiveThirtyEight had found that Walters voted with President Trump 99% of the time, and was the eighth-most partisan Trump supporter in the House, when compared to her district's voting patterns.

=== Federal taxation legislation of 2017 ===
In November 2017, Walters voted in favor of the Tax Cuts and Jobs Act of 2017, the house version of the Republican Party's tax reform bill. The House bill removed state and local tax breaks that many Californians used, such as the mortgage interest deduction. Several House Republicans representing Californian districts voted against the legislation because it raised taxes on Californians. Walters said after the vote that she had received assurances from House Speaker Paul Ryan that a reconciliation version of the bill with the Senate would restore the lost tax breaks that had been removed in the House version. According to the Los Angeles Times, immediately after the vote, the Senate version of the bill "contains even deeper cuts to state and local tax breaks that are popular with California's, but maintains the mortgage interest deduction at its current level, instead of cutting it in half, as the House plan does. It also repeals Obamacare's individual mandate, a move that could further complicate the situation for California members who represent districts with a lot of Obamacare enrollees."

=== Environment ===
In 2015, Walters sponsored and voted for H.R. 1732, a bill that opposed the Waters of the United States rule, which expands the federal government's jurisdiction to regulate waters and certain adjacent lands.

Also in 2015, Walters voted to repeal the limits on carbon dioxide emissions from power plants set by the Clean Power Plan. "Forcing a shift away from traditional energy resources", she explained, "would ultimately stifle the economy for years to come and harm consumers' pocketbooks." Walters also co-sponsored the Stopping EPA Overreach Act of 2017, which became law, and which declares that there is no legal requirement to regulate global warming.

Walters was originally a climate change denier, but she began to shift her views after meeting with the Orange County Central chapter of the Citizens' Climate Lobby in 2014. After they explained to her how the market-based approach of carbon fee and dividend could have a positive impact on the climate, without expanding government, Walters replied, "You guys are doing it the right way". In July 2017, Walters voted to veto the Perry Amendment, which would have de-funded Defense Department efforts to track climate change and its threats to military bases.

In October 2017, after President Trump pulled out of the Paris Agreement, "Walters officially changed from a climate-change skeptic to a believer ... and joined the Congressional Climate Solutions Caucus".

=== Health care ===
Walters supported the repeal of Obamacare, and voted in 2015 for H.R. 596, the House bill to repeal Obamacare. She also voted for H.R. 3762, the Restoring Americans' Healthcare Freedom Reconciliation Act, which would have repealed Obamacare.

Walters supported repealing and replacing the Affordable Care Act (known as Obamacare) with the American Health Care Act, the GOP's replacement plan for Obamacare, which did not come to a vote initially. She said that passing the American Health Care Act "is a critical step" towards the goal of rescuing "this failing health-care system".

On May 4, 2017, Walters voted to repeal the Patient Protection and Affordable Care Act (Obamacare) and pass the American Health Care Act. In early 2017, Walters tweeted that she was "committed to protecting patients w/ pre-existing conditions to ensure their access to quality, affordable health care". However, USA Today noted that the version of the American Health Care Act that she voted in favor of allows insurance companies to charge higher premiums to individuals with pre-existing conditions (such as cancer, epilepsy, diabetes, and pregnancy). Walters was an original co-sponsor of H.R. 4684, the Access to Quality Sober Living Act, which would require the Department of Health and Human Services to establish best practices for sober living facilities for opioid addicts. This legislation was written after a subcommittee hearing exposed scams at such facilities.

=== Gun control ===
A May 2018 profile of Walters referred to her long-time "reputation as a gun-rights advocate". In the State Assembly, "she twice voted against bills requiring the micro-stamping of bullets from automatic firearms", against "background checks for ammunition buyers", against a ban on "large-capacity conversion kits", and against "prohibiting people under domestic violence restraining orders from obtaining firearms". But during her years in the House, "California voters' concerns about school shootings had risen dramatically, with 73 percent of respondents admitting they were worried about a mass shooting at their public school", with high-school students in Walters's district holding gun violence protests.

=== Keystone pipeline ===
Walters voted in support of the Keystone XL Pipeline Act (H.R. 3) in 2015.

=== LGBT rights ===
As an Assemblywoman, Walters endorsed Proposition 8, which declared same-sex marriage illegal in the state of California. Then-Minority Whip Steny Hoyer (D-MD) named Walters as one of seven Republican representatives who switched their votes regarding a bill upholding an executive order prohibiting defense contractors from discriminating against people based on their sexual orientation. The identities of the seven vote-switchers were not publicly recorded, and none of those named by Hoyer confirmed his claims. PBS NewsHour reported that, under shouts of "shame", Walters voted against this protection, which ended up narrowly failing.

=== Military ===
In January 2018, Walters voted for H.R. 695, the 2018 Department of Defense Appropriations Act, saying that she had acted to "fully fund the Department of Defense to ensure our men and women in uniform have the tools and resources they need to keep our country safe... It is imperative our armed forces are properly equipped and ready to meet current and future challenges."

=== Nuclear waste ===
In March 2018, Walters signed a bi-partisan letter in support of funding to re-start the licensing process for the Yucca Mountain nuclear waste repository. "Just south of California's 45th district", she stated, "1,800 tons of spent nuclear fuel sits at the inactive San Onofre Nuclear Generating Station (SONGS). Unfortunately, our Nation's nuclear waste management system is broken, and spent fuel sits at nuclear sites like Songs, with nowhere to go. By law, the Federal government is obligated to take ownership of, and safely store, spent fuel at a permanent repository."

=== Strikes ===
In 2014, Walters voted for a bill in committee that banned public transit workers from going on strike.

=== Human trafficking ===
In February 2018, the House passed H.R. 1865, the Allow States and Victims to Fight Online Sex Trafficking Act (FOSTA), introduced by Walters, Ann Wagner (R-Missouri), and Carolyn Maloney (D-New York). It included an amendment written by Walters that would permit enforcement of criminal and civil sex trafficking laws against websites that facilitate online sex trafficking. The amended legislation passed with bi-partisan support.

== Personal life ==
Walters is married and has four children. In 2010, financial disclosure forms showed that Mimi Walters' holdings include between $100,000 and $1 million in Goldman Sachs. A 2017 congressional financial disclosure form showed Walters' had holdings in Boustead Securities, Laguna Advisory Services, and an apartment building in Encinitas, California. Walters is a Roman Catholic.

== Electoral history ==
California's 45th congressional district election, 2014
Primary election
Party	Candidate	Votes	%
Republican	Mimi Walters	39,631	45.1
Democratic	Drew E. Leavens	24,721	28.1
Republican	Greg Raths	21,284	24.2
No party preference	Al Salehi	2,317	2.6
Total votes		87,953	100.0
General election
Republican	Mimi Walters	106,083	65.1
Democratic	Drew E. Leavens	56,819	34.9
Total votes		162,902	100.0
Republican hold			

California's 45th congressional district election, 2016
Primary election
Party	Candidate	Votes	%
Republican	Mimi Walters (incumbent)	65,773	40.9
Democratic	Ron Varasteh	44,449	27.6
Republican	Greg Raths	30,961	19.2
Democratic	Max Gouron	19,716	12.3
Total votes		160,899	100.0
General election
Republican	Mimi Walters (incumbent)	182,618	58.6
Democratic	Ron Varasteh	129,231	41.4
Total votes		311,849	100.0
Republican hold			

California's 45th congressional district election, 2018
Primary election
Party	Candidate	Votes	%
Republican	Mimi Walters (incumbent)	86,764	51.7
Democratic	Katie Porter	34,078	20.3
Democratic	Dave Min	29,979	17.8
Democratic	Brian Forde	10,107	6.0
No party preference	John Graham	3,817	2.3
Democratic	Kia Hamadanchy	3,212	1.9
Total votes		167,957	100.0
General election
Democratic	Katie Porter	158,906	52.1
Republican	Mimi Walters (incumbent)	146,383	47.9
Total votes		305,289	100.0
Democratic gain from Republican			

== See also ==
- Women in the United States House of Representatives

U.S. House of Representatives
Preceded by John Campbell	Member of the U.S. House of Representatives from California's 45th congressional district 2015–2019	Succeeded by Katie Porter
U.S. order of precedence (ceremonial)
Preceded by Steve Knight as Former U.S. Representative	Order of precedence of the United States as Former U.S. Representative	Succeeded by Mike Garcia as Former U.S. Representative
