= Political theatre =

Political theatre may refer to:

- Political drama, a theatrical genre
- Guerrilla theatre, a type of political protest with a theatrical quality
- Political posturing or Kabuki, political acts made only for the sake of appearance
- Political stunt, a type of publicity stunt intended to sway public opinion on a political issue
