= Dana Rohrabacher =

American politician (born 1947)

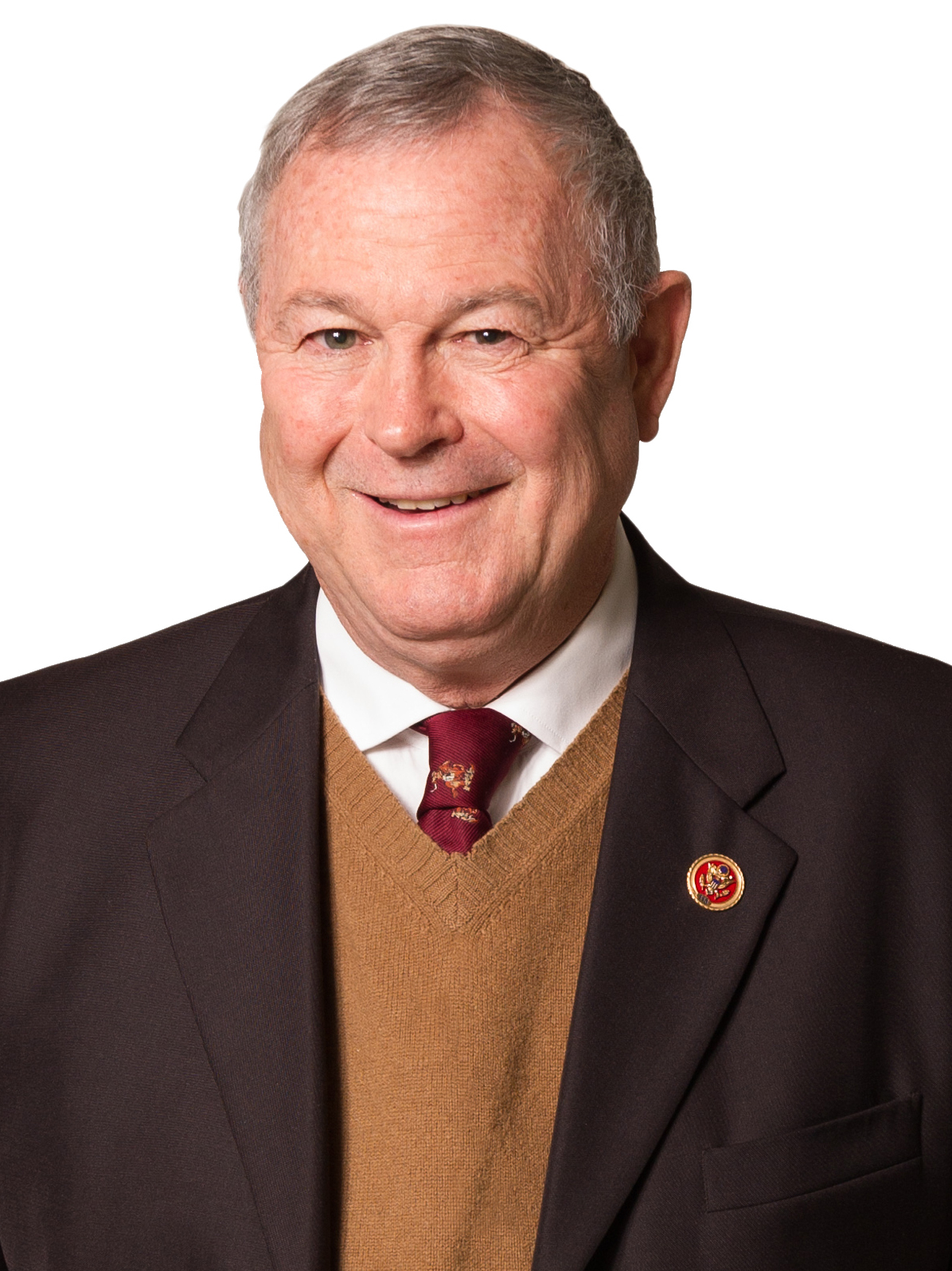
- Official portrait, 2015

Member of the U.S. House of Representatives from California
- In office January 3, 1989 – January 3, 2019
- Preceded by: Dan Lungren
- Succeeded by: Harley Rouda
- Constituency: 42nd district (1989–1993); 45th district (1993–2003); 46th district (2003–2013); 48th district (2013–2019)

Personal details
- Born: Dana Tyrone Rohrabacher; June 21, 1947 (age 79) Coronado, California, U.S.
- Party: Republican
- Spouse: Rhonda Carmony (m. 1997)
- Children: 3
- Education: Los Angeles Harbor College; California State University, Long Beach (BA); University of Southern California (MA)
- Rohrabacher's voice Rohrabacher honoring Alfred E. Mann. Recorded June 7, 2012

Dana Tyrone Rohrabacher (/ˈrɔːrəˌbɑːkər/ ROR-ə-BAH-kər; born June 21, 1947) is an American former politician who served in the U.S. House of Representatives from 1989 to 2019, representing California's 48th congressional district for the last three terms of his House tenure. A member of the Republican Party, Rohrabacher was defeated by Democrat Harley Rouda in 2018 by a margin of 7.2%. During his tenure in Congress, Rohrabacher expressed strong pro-Russia and pro-Putin opinions which have raised questions about his relationship with Vladimir Putin and the Russian government. Politico dubbed him as "Putin's favorite congressman".

== Early life, education, and early career ==
Dana Tyrone Rohrabacher was born on June 21, 1947, in Coronado, California, the son of Doris M. (née Haring) and Donald Tyler Rohrabacher and had an older brother Kim (1944-2007). Rohrabacher graduated from Palos Verdes High School in Palos Verdes Estates, California, attended Los Angeles Harbor College, and earned a bachelor's degree in history at California State University, Long Beach in 1969. He received his master's degree in American Studies at the University of Southern California. After graduating, the U.S. Army ordered Rohrabacher to undergo a draft physical, but he was declared ineligible after he presented an X-ray showing a hip injury he had sustained while playing football.

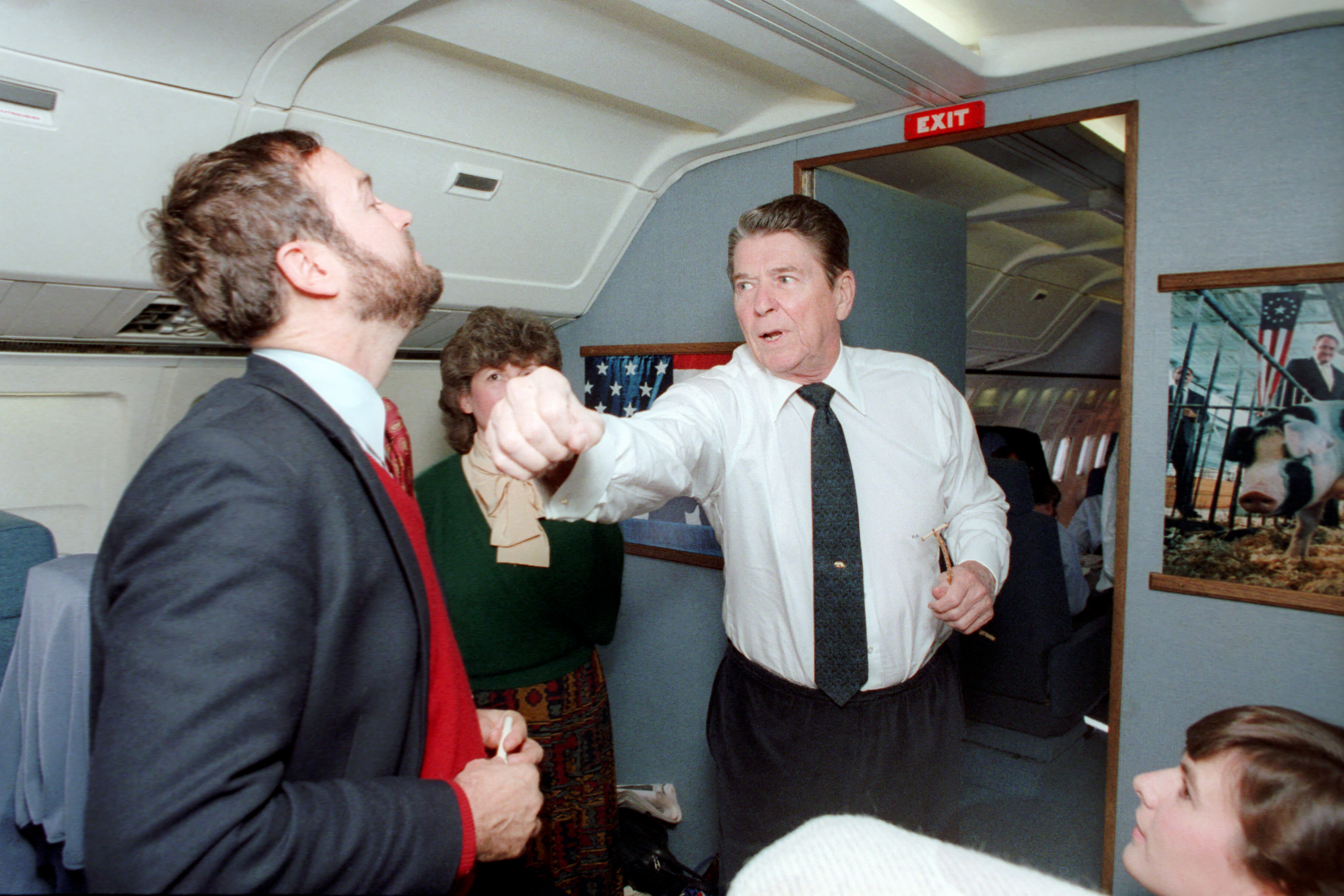
President Ronald Reagan faking a punch to Dana Rohrabacher aboard Air Force One on a trip back to California in 1986

While in graduate school and during the early 1970s, Rohrabacher had a side activity as a folk singer. He was also a writer for the Orange County Register.

Rohrabacher served as assistant press secretary to Ronald Reagan during his 1976 and 1980 presidential campaigns. Rohrabacher then worked as a speechwriter and special assistant to President Reagan from 1981 to 1988. During his tenure at the White House, Rohrabacher played a leading role in the formulation of the Reagan Doctrine.

== U.S. House of Representatives ==
=== Elections ===
Rohrabacher left the Reagan administration in 1988 to pursue Dan Lungren's recently vacated House seat. Campaigning on his ties to the president, and earning support from Iran-Contra figure Lt. Col. Oliver North, Rohrabacher won the Republican primary with a plurality of 35%. He won the general election with 64% of the vote. He twice experienced serious primary competition, in 1992 and 1998. After redistricting, he won a three-candidate primary election in 1992 with a plurality of 48%. In 1998, he won an open primary with 54% of the vote.

==== 2008 ====
In 2008, Rohrabacher defeated Democratic nominee Debbie Cook, 53–43%.

==== 2010 ====
In 2010, Rohrabacher defeated Democratic nominee Ken Arnold, 62–38%.

==== 2012 ====
After redistricting, Rohrabacher announced in 2012 that he would run in the newly redrawn 48th Congressional district. He said "The new 48th District is a good fit and something that will enable me to serve my constituents and the country well." He won election in the 48th district with 61% of the vote.

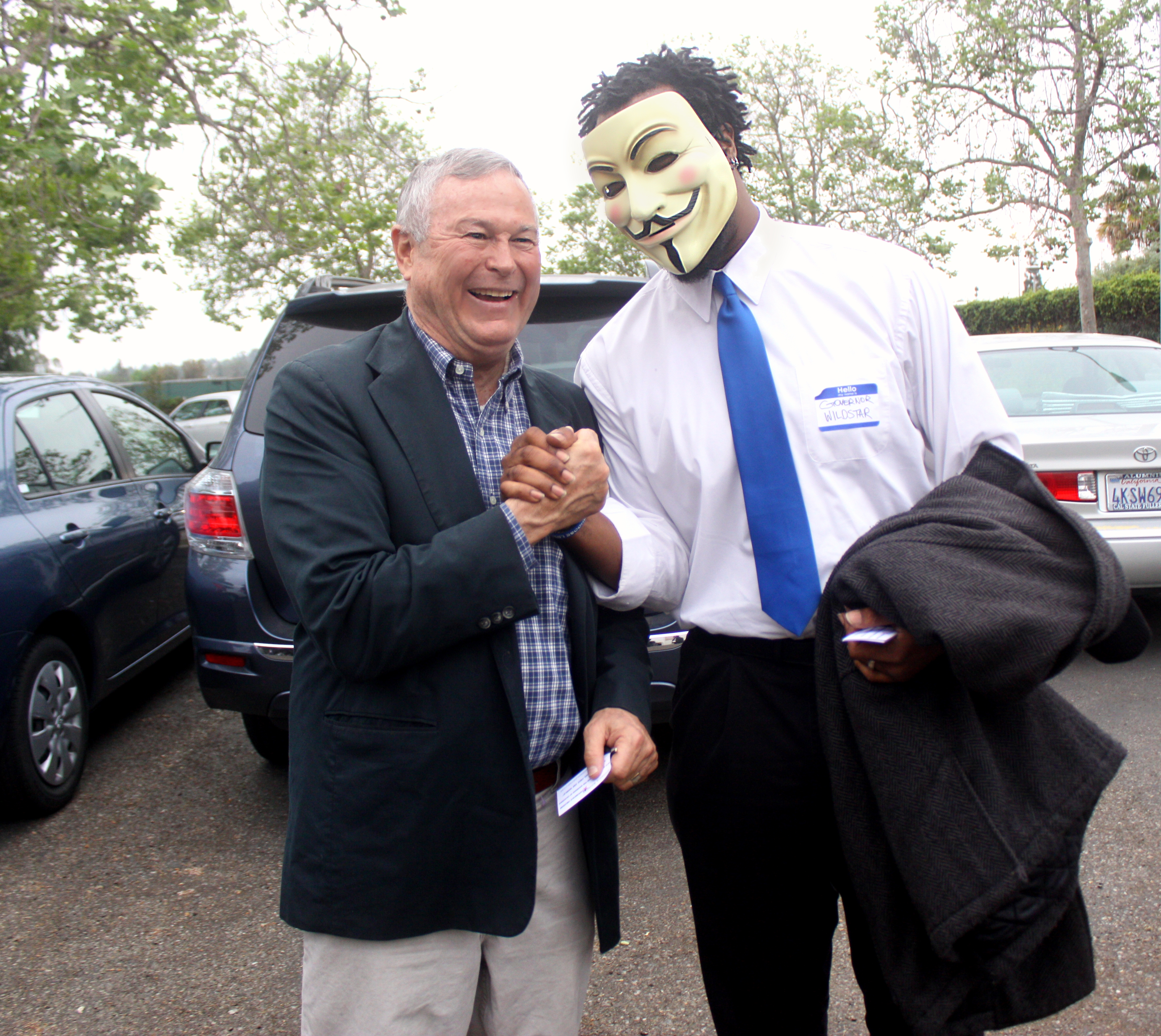
Rohrabacher shakes hands with a supporter wearing a Guy Fawkes mask in 2013

==== 2014 ====
Rohrabacher won re-election with 64% of the vote.

==== 2016 ====
Rohrabacher won re-election with 59% of the vote.

==== 2018 ====
In March 2018, CNN reported that Erik Prince, a former intern of Rohrabacher while he was freshman congressman in 1990 and very close ally of Rohrabacher, hosted a fundraiser at Prince's Virginia home with expected attendees including Oliver North on March 18, 2018. On October 12, 2018, the Los Angeles Times reported that the Congressional Leadership Fund, a Super PAC closely associated with House Speaker Paul Ryan, had passed over Rohrabacher in its initial round of broadcast television advertising across Southern California. Rohrabacher's campaign denied this, saying that CLF had spent "about $2.4 million and they have an additional $1 million in media buys scheduled" for Rohrabacher.

Democrat Harley Rouda defeated Rohrabacher on Election Day with 53.6% of the vote.

=== Tenure ===
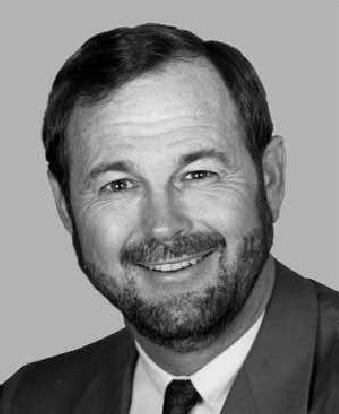
A picture of Rohrabacher from the 105th Congress's directory (1997)

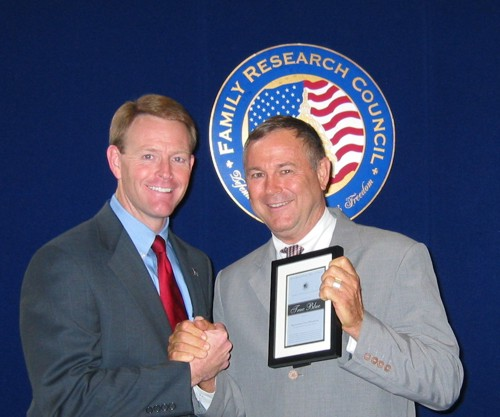
Rohrabacher receiving the True Blue award from FRC President Tony Perkins in 2003

==== Election fraud and conviction ====
Rohrabacher was charged with improper use of campaign contributions in connection with a 1995 state assembly election. Rohrabacher provided some of his campaign funds to his campaign manager (and future wife), Rhonda Carmony, to promote a decoy Democratic candidate to draw away votes from another Democratic candidate. Rohrabacher was found guilty and fined $50,000.

==== Payment for 30-year-old screenplay ====
On November 4, 2005, the Los Angeles Times reported that Rohrabacher was paid $23,000 for a 30-year-old screen play he had written. At issue was whether the producer paid him for the screenplay or for introductions to congressional and federal officials. Rohrabacher said that the introductions were made in good faith, were nothing that was not done regularly for legitimate causes, and that the introductions had only become an issue because of Joseph Medawar's alleged misdeeds. In May 2006, Rohrabacher announced through his press secretary that he would return the $23,000 (~$36,732 in 2025). The decision was made public shortly before Medawar took responsibility in a United States District Court for bilking $3.4 million from about 50 investors.

==== 2011 visit to Iraq ====
During a trip to Iraq in June 2011, Rohrabacher said that when Iraq becomes a wealthy nation, it should pay back the US for all the money it had spent since the Iraq invasion. Rohrabacher also commented that he would be holding a hearing with the Sub-Committee on Oversight and Investigations into whether Iraq committed "crimes against humanity" during an attack on Camp Ashraf in April 2011. The incident left 34 residents killed and over 300 wounded. The delegation was denied access to the camp by Iraqi government, citing their sovereignty. Rohrabacher's delegation was subsequently asked to leave the country.

==== 2012 FBI warning ====
Rohrabacher was warned in 2012 in a secure room at the Capitol building by an agent from the FBI that Russian spies may have been trying to recruit him to act on Russia's behalf as an "agent of influence", after he met with a member of the Russian foreign ministry privately in Moscow. Following the ISIS terrorist attacks in Tehran on June 7, 2017, in which 17 civilians were killed, he suggested that the attack could be viewed as 'a good thing', and surmised that President Trump might have been behind the coordination of this terrorist attack. An article in The Atlantic suggested that there was serious concern in the State Department of ties between Rohrabacher and the Russian government.

==== Jack Wu ====
In June 2015, Rohrabacher released a statement accusing former treasurer of his reelection committee, Jack Wu, of embezzling more than $170,000 from his campaign. Rohrabacher's attorney, Charles H. Bell Jr., stated that the congressman had filed criminal charges against Wu with the Orange County district attorney and state attorney general.

==== 2016 consideration for Secretary of State ====
Following the election of Donald Trump in 2016, Rohrabacher was on the shortlist for Secretary of State along with Mitt Romney and eventual pick Rex Tillerson.

=== Committee assignments ===
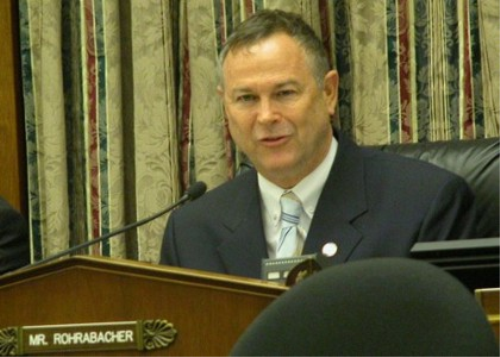
Rohrabacher presides over a meeting of the Space and Aeronautics Subcommittee of the House Science Committee.

- Committee on Foreign Affairs
  - Subcommittee on the Middle East and South Asia
  - Subcommittee on Oversight and Investigations (Chair)
- Committee on Science, Space and Technology
  - Subcommittee on Space and Aeronautics
  - Subcommittee on Energy and Environment

Rohrabacher chaired the Space and Aeronautics Subcommittee of the House Science Committee from 1997 until January 2005; he received a two-year waiver to serve beyond the six-year term limit.

As a senior member of the International Relations Committee, Rohrabacher led the effort to deny Most Favored Nation trading status to the People's Republic of China, citing that nation's dismal human rights record and opposition to democracy. His subcommittee assignments were East Asia and Pacific, and Middle East and South Asia.

=== Caucus memberships ===
- Congressional Cannabis Caucus
- Congressional Human Rights Caucus
- United States Congressional International Conservation Caucus
- Congressional Taiwan Caucus
- Sportsmen's Caucus
- Freedom Caucus
- House Baltic Caucus

== Foreign and security policy positions ==
In foreign policy, Rohrabacher supported withdrawing U.S. troops from Afghanistan, called for Trump to punish Turkish President Erdoğan on embassy violence, sided with Russia in the Russia–Georgia war, and gave a qualified defense of the annexation of Crimea in 2014.

=== Russia ===
Rohrabacher has expressed strong pro-Russia and pro-Putin opinions which have raised questions about his relationship with Vladimir Putin and the Russian government. Politico and others have dubbed him "Putin's favorite congressman".

Early in Rohrabacher's congressional career in 1990 or 1991, KGB agent and deputy mayor of Saint Petersburg Vladimir Putin and two other Russians entered Rohrabacher's congressional office in Washington, D.C. In a 2013 interview, Rohrabacher asserted that he and Putin later became close friends.

According to Erik Prince, Prince, as an intern on Rohrabacher's staff, travelled around the world on fact-finding missions to support Rohrabacher's interests.

Rohrabacher called the Russian banker Aleksandr Torshin, a Putin ally, "sort of the conservatives' favorite Russian".

On September 8, 2008, at a House of Representatives Foreign Affairs Committee meeting, Rohrabacher argued that the Georgians had initiated a recent military confrontation in the ongoing Russia–Georgia war.

In 2012, the FBI warned Rohrabacher that his support for Russia's interests was allowing Russia to cultivate him for its purposes.

In February 2013, Rohrabacher gave a speech urging the right to self-determination for the Baloch people in Pakistan at an UNPO conference in London.

In April 2014, he tweeted that "If majority of people legally residing in Alaska want to be part of Russia then it's OK with me."

In April 2016, Rohrabacher and a member of his staff, Paul Behrends, traveled to Russia and returned with Yuri Chaika's confidential talking points memo about incriminating information on Democratic donors. The talking points paper used at the Trump Tower meeting on June 9, 2016 by Natalia Veselnitskaya was very similar to the document Rohrabacher had obtained from Chaika in April.

Rohrabacher is known for his longtime friendship with Putin and for his defense of "the Russian point of view". On June 15, 2016, then-House Majority Leader Kevin McCarthy told a group of Republicans, "'There's two people I think Putin pays: Rohrabacher and Trump. Swear to God'". Then-House Speaker Paul Ryan ended the conversation by saying "'No leaks. This is how we know we're a real family here'". The Republicans present were sworn to secrecy. Brendan Buck, counselor to Paul Ryan, initially denied these reports, but was then told that The Washington Post had a recording. After the recording was leaked by the Post in May 2017, McCarthy said the comment was intended as a joke.

Around that time, Rohrabacher planned—in his capacity as chair of the Europe subcommittee—to hold a hearing on the Magnitsky Act, which bars certain Russian officials from entering the United States or holding any financial assets in American banks. Rohrabacher reportedly wanted Bill Browder, the American-born investor who had lobbied for the act's passage after what he claims was the illegal appropriation of his hedge fund's assets and the subsequent murder of his Russian lawyer, to testify. Rohrabacher planned to subject him to what was described as a "show trial". In addition to questioning Browder closely and skeptically about his claims, Rohrabacher intended to show a feature-length documentary film critical of the Magnitsky claims. Another scheduled witness was Russian lawyer Natalia Veselnitskaya, a longtime lobbyist against the Magnitsky Act who attended the June 9 Trump Tower meeting. In July 2017, Browder testified to the Senate Judiciary Committee that persons supporting the interests of foreign governments or acting on their behalf, especially Russia, must comply with Foreign Agents Registration Act (FARA) requirements, and that no one behind the screening of the Andrei Nekrasov film had met the disclosure filings under FARA.

When Foreign Affairs Committee chairman Ed Royce learned of Rohrabacher's plans, he canceled the hearing and forbade Rohrabacher from showing the film. In its stead, he held a full committee hearing on U.S.–Russia relations at which Rohrabacher was allowed to submit some of the pro-Russian claims into evidence. The film was ultimately shown at the Newseum, and an intern in Rohrabacher's office who later worked for the Trump transition team sent emails promoting the film from the subcommittee offices.

After Donald Trump won the 2016 presidential election, Rohrabacher defended his approach to improving Russian–American relations. He had previously met at least twice with Rinat Akhmetshin, a former Soviet spy "who met with President Trump's son, son-in-law and campaign manager in June 2016", to discuss Russian sanctions.

In a May 2017 interview with CNN, Rohrabacher said, "'We have a huge double standard with Russia when it comes to prisoners and other things'". Rohrabacher added that interference by the Russian intelligence services' in the 2016 U.S. election was the same as the National Security Agency (NSA) bugging German Chancellor Angela Merkel's phone.

In July 2017, Rohrabacher voted to impose sanctions on Iran, North Korea, and Russia.

On 16 August 2017, Rohrabacher visited Julian Assange in the Ecuadorian Embassy in London and told him that Trump would pardon him on the condition that he would agree to say that Russia was not involved in the 2016 Democratic National Committee email leaks. At his extradition hearings in 2020, Assange's defense team alleged in court that this offer was made "on instructions from the president". Trump and Rohrabacher subsequently said they had never spoken about the offer, and Rohrabacher said he had made the offer on his own initiative.

In October 2017, the House Committee on Foreign Affairs placed restrictions on Rohrabacher's ability to use committee money to pay for foreign travel due to concerns over his interest in Russia.

On November 21, 2017, The New York Times reported that Rohrabacher had come under scrutiny from special counsel Robert Mueller and the Senate Intelligence Committee for his close ties to the Kremlin.

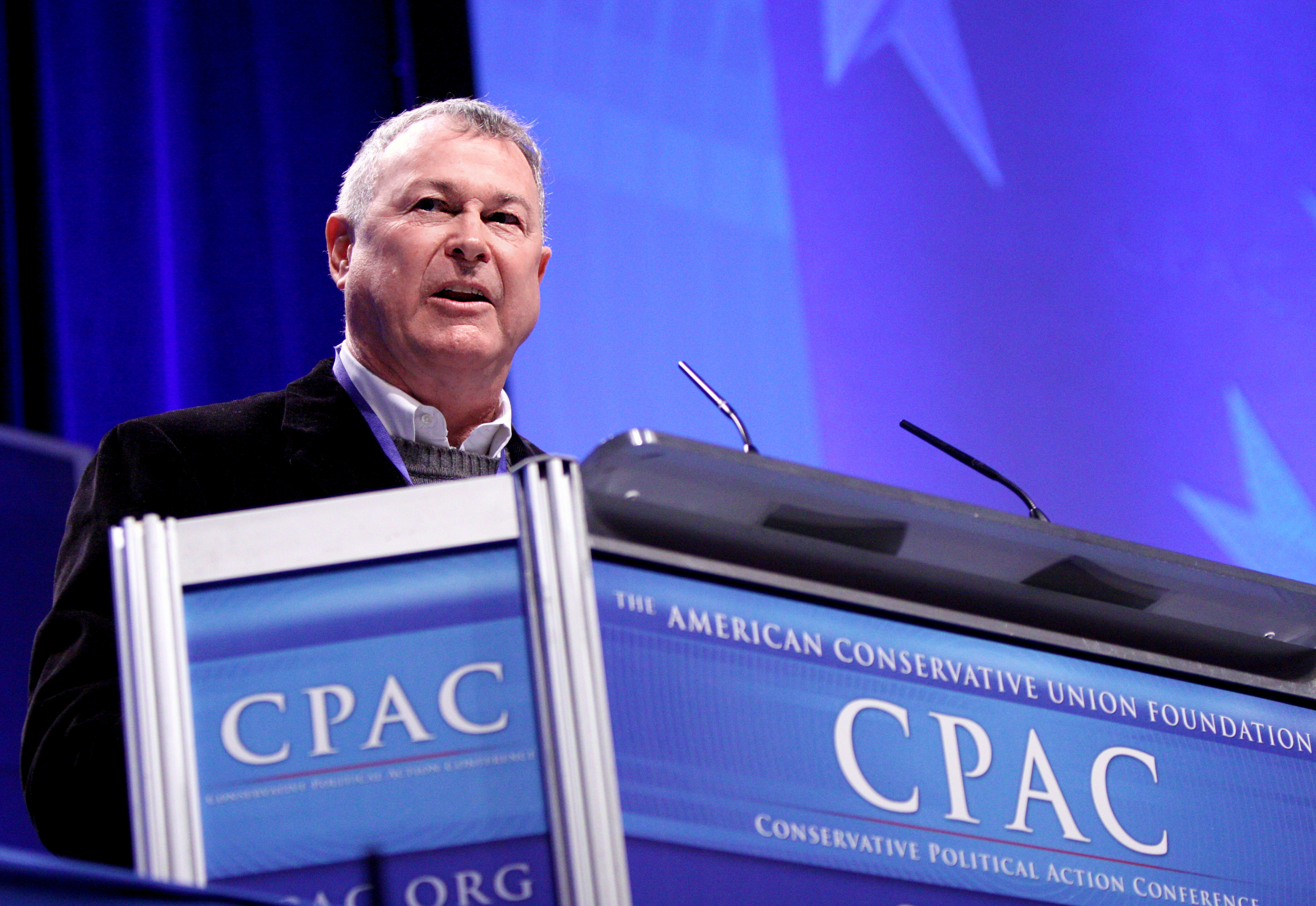
Rohrabacher speaking at the 2011 Conservative Political Action Conference (CPAC)

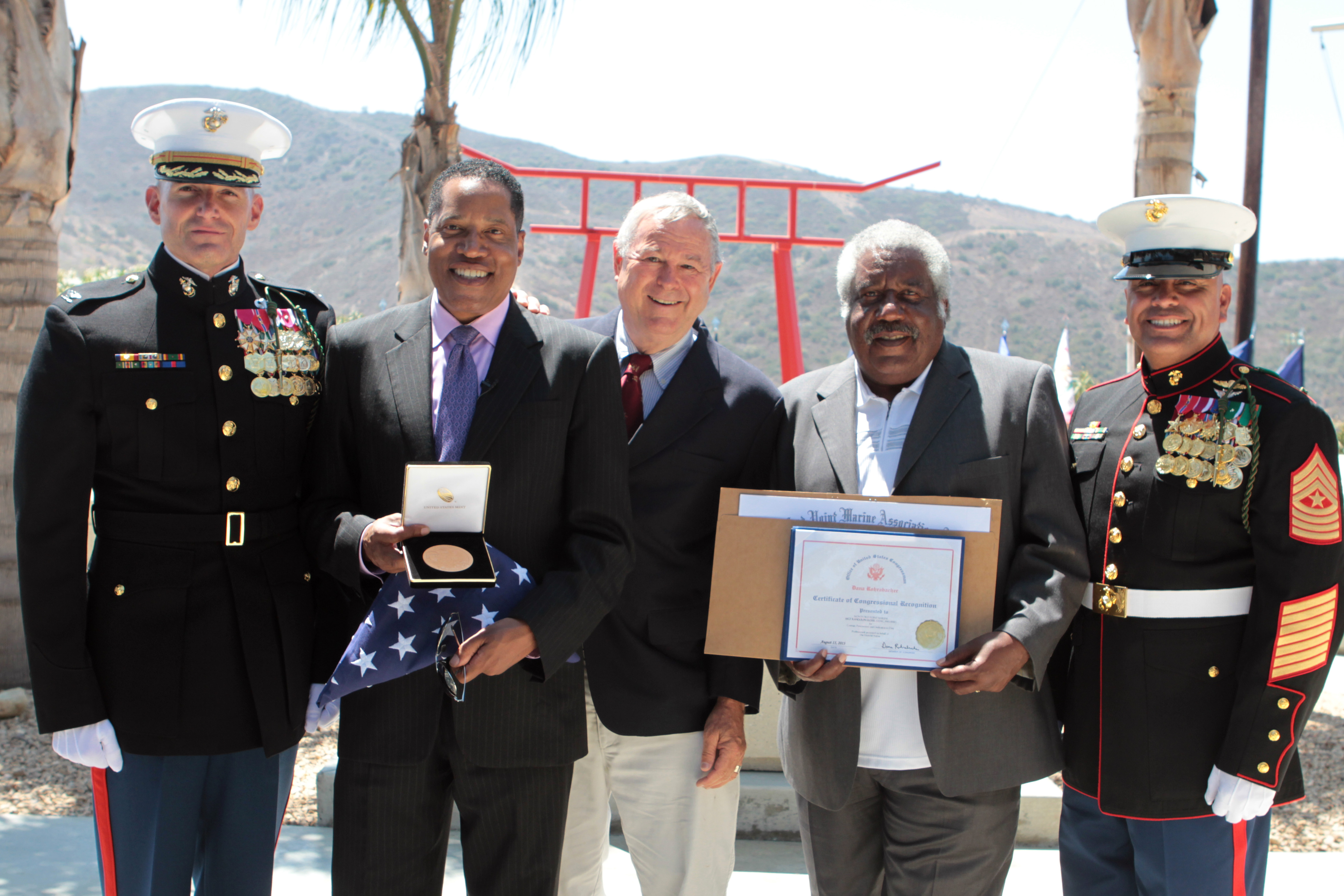
Rohrabacher with Larry Elder and Kirk Elder accept Congressional Gold Medal on behalf of Staff Sgt. Randolph Elder

In an interview with Fox Business Channel on August 24, 2018, Rohrabacher attacked Attorney General Jeff Sessions because Sessions had refused to fire Robert Mueller and shut down the Russia collusion investigation. He said: "'The fact that Jeff Sessions has not quit is a disloyalty to this president and to the country, the fact is, if he disagrees with what the president wants him to do, he should resign'".

In February 2020, Rohrabacher told Yahoo News that his goal during his 2017 meeting with Julian Assange was to find evidence for a widely debunked conspiracy theory that WikiLeaks' real source was not Russian intelligence agents for the DNC emails but former DNC staffer Seth Rich. Stephanie Grisham, a White House spokesperson for President Trump, stated that Trump barely knew Rohrabacher and had not spoken with Rohrabacher "'on this subject or almost any subject'".

On February 19, 2020, Edward Fitzgerald, Julian Assange's attorney, asserted at Westminster Magistrates' Court in London that Rohrabacher had been sent on behalf of President Trump in August 2017 to offer Assange a pardon from Trump if Assange could release material to show that Russian intelligence was not involved in the 2016 United States election interference.

=== Terrorism ===
In 2006, Rohrabacher chaired the Subcommittee on Oversight and Investigations of the U.S. House Committee on International Relations, which investigated whether the Oklahoma City bombers had assistance from foreign sources; the committee determined there was no conclusive evidence of a foreign connection. In the 113th Congress, Rohrabacher was chair of the House Foreign Affairs Subcommittee on Europe, Eurasia and Emerging Threats.

Speaking about Islam, he said during a hearing in April 2013, "I hope we all work together against a religion that will motivate people to murder children and other threats to us as a civilization."

In the wake of the 2016 Orlando nightclub shooting, Rohrabacher put out a press release stating that he felt "outrage" and a "renewed commitment to defeat and destroy the radical Islamic movement that fosters such mayhem." He stressed that Americans must "be sure not to label all Muslims as terrorist murderers." Rohrabacher met Seddique Mateen, the father of the shooter, in 2014 during routine meetings with constituents. He called Mateen an "estranged individual."

In a statement to clarify his position, Rohrabacher wrote that he opposes "the use of force against unarmed civilians no matter who is the victim or who is doing the killing" but he is also against "Iran's vicious Mullah monarchy" and "when it comes to Sunni terrorists or Shiite terrorists, I prefer them to target each other rather than any other victims, especially innocent civilians and Americans." He added that it will "require support for those proud Iranians who want to win their freedom and heritage from Mullahs and are willing to fight for it. That does not include Isis, but it may include a lot of Iranians who see blowing up Khomeini's mausoleum as an expression of freedom from the yolk [sic] of Islamic terror."

=== Defense of interrogation techniques and extraordinary rendition ===
On April 17, 2007, during a House hearing on trans-Atlantic relations, Rohrabacher defended the Bush administration's program of extraordinary rendition. He said that the unfair treatment of one innocent suspect is an acceptable "unfortunate consequence" of holding others who would otherwise be free to commit terror acts. After he received boos and groans from the gallery, Rohrabacher responded, "Well, I hope it's your families, I hope it's your families that suffer the consequences," and "I hope it's your family members that die." Rohrabacher was subsequently interrupted by protesters wearing orange jumpsuits who were removed from the gallery. For his comment that imprisoning and torturing one innocent person was a fair price to pay for locking up 50 terrorists who would "go out and plant a bomb and kill 20,000 people", on April 25 Rohrabacher was named Countdown with Keith Olbermann's "Worst Person in the World".

=== Afghanistan ===
Rohrabacher's interest in Afghanistan extends back at least to the late 1980s, before his time in office, when he entered the country in the company of Afghan mujahideen fighters who were fighting Soviet occupation forces. Reportedly, these fighters "actually engaged Soviet troops in combat near the city of Jalalabad during the two months Rohrabacher was with them." In the years after the Soviet–Afghan War (1979–1989), Rohrabacher said his "passion" was to bring back the country's exiled king, Muhammad Zahir Shah.

In 2003, Rohrabacher defended the new Afghan constitution against those who saw in it mainly empowerment of warlords, saying:

I've heard a lot of negative posturing about ... these people who happened to have been the guys who sided with the United States ... Dostam, Atta, Khan ... these were the people who defeated the Taliban ... Just keep that in mind if you're an American. They came to help us defeat people who slaughtered our own people [September 11, 2001]. And I'm grateful for that. And I'm not about to label them in these pejorative terms [as warlords], especially when the Taliban are still on the border. ... I would admonish [you] not to go so quickly in getting rid of people who helped us defeat the Taliban.

Rohrabacher has since become a proponent of withdrawing from Afghanistan. He protested against the troop build-up in Afghanistan by President Obama, saying "If the Taliban is going is be defeated, it's got to be by the Afghan people themselves, not by sending more U.S. troops, which could actually be counterproductive." When Congressman Jim McGovern offered an amendment in 2011 requiring the Pentagon to draw up an exit plan from Afghanistan, Rohrabacher was just one of six Republicans to sign on. Rohrabacher voted for McGovern's Amendment to the National Defense Authorization Act, requiring an exit plan from Afghanistan. The bill failed by a 204–215 margin.

Rohrabacher was against former President Obama's gradual drawdown of troops, instead supporting a full withdrawal. Saying "If we're going to leave, we should leave." Rohrabacher has said that "The centralized system of government foisted upon the Afghan people is not going to hold after we leave." And "So let's quit prolonging the agony and inevitable. Karzai's regime is corrupt and non representative of Afghanistan's tribal culture. This failed strategy is not worth one more drop of American blood. Under the current strategy, our military presence alienates more Afghans that it pacifies. So if you're going to pull the plug, then we need to get the hell out now." Rohrabacher has repeatedly raised high-level concerns in the US Congress and Washington, D.C., about the significant corruption in Afghanistan, including the Kabul Bank scandal, where hundreds of millions of U.S. taxpayers' dollars allegedly disappeared in a short period of time at the apparent hands of close Karzai family members, including brothers Mahmoud Karzai (a.k.a. Mahmood Karzai) and Ahmed Wali Karzai. Rohrabacher worked to bring attention to the systemic corruption in the Karzai government and cut U.S. taxpayers' funding for these wasteful projects and programs, involving corruption within the Hamid Karzai government.

In April 2012, CNN reported that "A top Republican on the House Foreign Affairs committee was asked by the State Department not to go to Afghanistan because President Hamid Karzai objected to the visit. ... Dana Rohrabacher, R-California, told Security Clearance he was readying to travel with five other Republicans from Dubai to Afghanistan's capital, Kabul, when the State Department requested he stay behind."

=== Bosnia and Kosovo independence ===
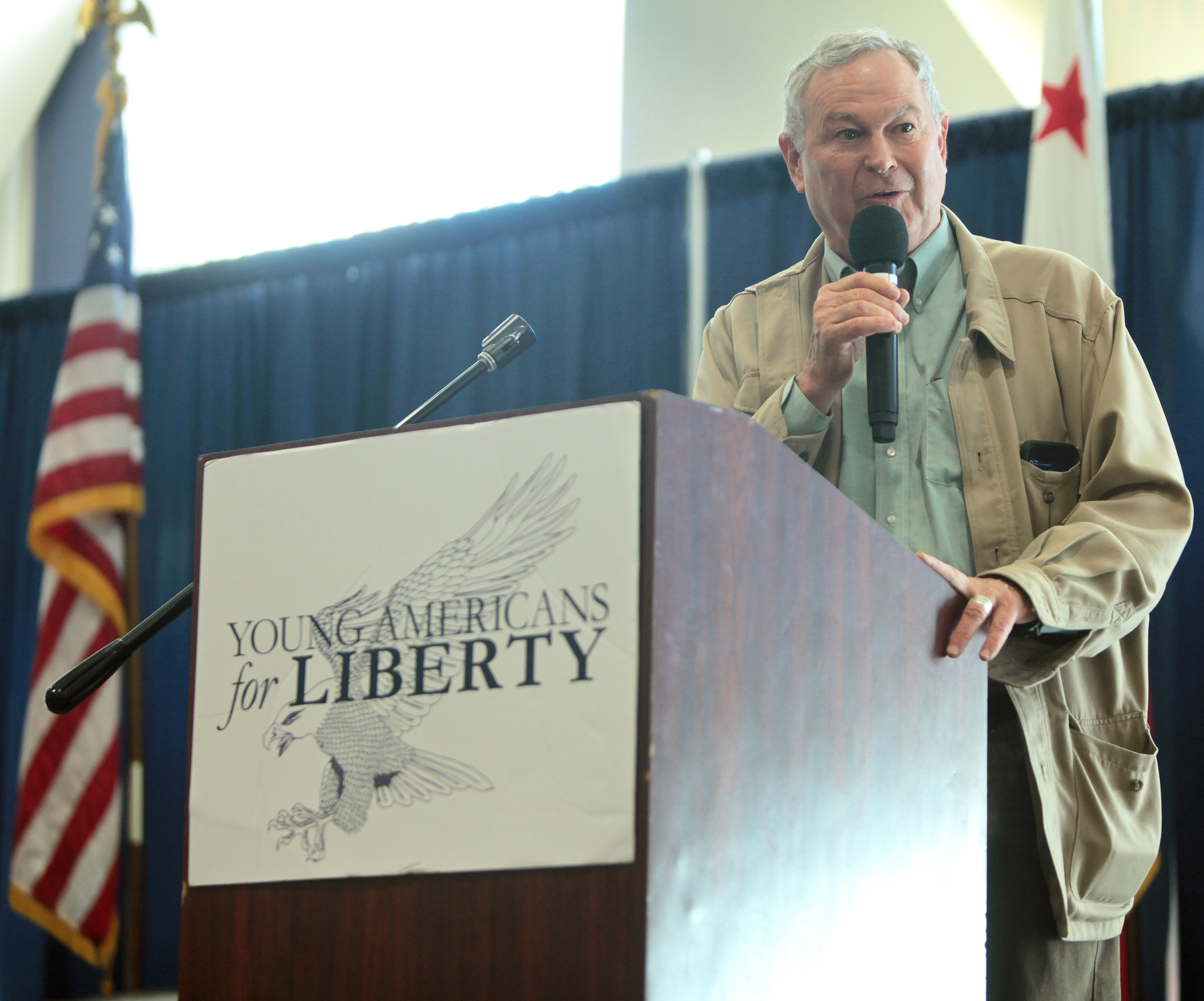
Rohrabacher speaking at the 2016 Young Americans for Liberty California State Convention

Rohrabacher was opposed to the involvement of American ground troops in the Yugoslav Wars. He advocated for the direct bombing of the military on Yugoslav soil, criticizing the ineffectiveness of western forces against the Bosnian Serbs. (NATO was limited to small fixed attacks, as these Serbs penetrated UN safe areas and attacked Bosniak forces.) Rohrabacher said they "should bomb Serbia's military infrastructure, in Serbia – get that, in Serbia – rather than dropping a couple of duds on tents, which only proves the West's gutlessness, and emboldens Serbian cutthroats." Rohrabacher considered the events in Bosnia to constitute genocide. In 1995, Rohrabacher personally visited Sarajevo in Bosnia, criticizing the devastation Serb forces inflicted on the city, saying "This is a loss to all mankind, not just to the people of Sarajevo." He also encountered vagabond children asking for money.

In 2001, the leader of the Albanian American Civic League ethnic lobby group, Joseph J. DioGuardi, praised Rohrabacher for his support to the Kosovo Liberation Army (KLA), a militia that was once labeled by Bill Clinton's special envoy to the Balkans Robert Gelbard as a terrorist organization, saying "He was the first member of Congress to insist that the United States arm the Kosova Liberation Army, and one of the few members who to this day publicly supports the independence of Kosova." Also in 2001, Rohrabacher gave a speech in support of American equipping the KLA with weaponry, comparing it to French support of America in the Revolutionary War, saying "Based on our own experience, the Kosova Liberation Army should have been armed. ... If the U.S. had armed the KLA in 1998, we would not be where we are today. The 'freedom fighters' would have secured their freedom and Kosova would be independent."

=== China ===
After a reconnaissance flight over the Spratly Islands in 1998, Rohrabacher said, "We can't ignore this bullying by the Communist Chinese in the Spratlys. The presence of the Chinese military troops...is not only a concern of the Philippines. It is also a concern of the U.S. and other democratic countries in the world."

In July 1999, Rohrabacher led the House floor in opposition to legislation normalizing trade ties between the United States and China. The following year, as the House weighed another China trade bill, Rohrabacher said the trade bill was a giveaway to a select number of American billionaires and the Beijing regime, adding that President Bill Clinton could call "communist China 'our strategic partner' until his face turns blue, but it won't make them any less red."

In 2011 interviews, Rohrabacher described the Chinese government under the leadership of Hu Jintao as "a gangster regime that murders its own people" and described the Chinese government as Nazis.

In December 2016, after President-elect Trump had a phone call with President of Taiwan Tsai Ing-wen, Rohrabacher said the call "showed the dictators in Beijing that he's not a pushover" and that China "has had an enormously aggressive foreign policy".

==== Organ harvesting in China ====
In 2012 Rohrabacher stated,

The CCP and its state security machine uses a wide range of repression techniques including, not only limited to, censorship, beatings, home imprisonment, forced labor camps, those labor camps called the Laogai of course. And the most ghoulish manifestation of this gangsterism is the forced harvesting of organs of the political prisoners and religious followers that it arrests, particularly of the Chinese religious movement known as the Falun Gong.

and

to rip open the body of someone who is simply involved in a religious or personal or political idea that is contrary to the wishes of the ruling elite, to rip a body open of someone like that especially if that person's religious or political beliefs are pacifistic and not a physical threat to the regime, this is about the most monstrous crime that I can conceive of.

=== Iraq War ===
Rohrabacher voted in support of the Authorization for the Use of Military Force Against Iraq in 2002, a position that he later said was "a mistake".

=== Iran ===
In August 2012, Rohrabacher noted on his official website that he had written a letter addressed to the U.S. State Department, noting his support of U.S. sponsorship of separatist movements in Iran. This elicited criticism from the Iranian-American community, which included challenging Rohrabacher's understanding of the historical background alluded to in his letter to the Department of State.

In June 2017, a day after an ISIL attack in Tehran, during a House Foreign Affairs Committee hearing, Rohrabacher stated: "Isn't it a good thing for us to have the United States finally backing up Sunnis who will attack Hezbollah and the Shiite threat to us, isn't that a good thing?" This comment was strongly criticized by the National Iranian American Council, which wrote, "Rohrabacher has a long history of bizarre and offensive statements on Iran, but his callousness toward the Iranian victims of ISIS terror might be his most callous and extreme thus far."

Rohrabacher supported removing the People's Mujahedin of Iran (MEK) from the United States State Department list of Foreign Terrorist Organizations; it was included on the list from 1997 to 2012.

=== Aid to Pakistan ===
In May 2011, in the wake of Osama Bin Laden's death, Rohrabacher introduced a bill to stop aid to Pakistan, stating that members of the government and of Pakistan's security force, the ISI, were either sheltering Bin Laden or completely incompetent. "We can no longer afford this foolishness. ... The time has come for us to stop subsidizing those who actively oppose us. Pakistan has shown itself not to be America's ally." Rohrabacher also demanded the return of the US helicopter that crashed in the operation to kill Bin Laden, stating "If this is not done immediately, it is probable, given Pakistan's history, that our technology has already found its way into the hands of the Communist Chinese military that is buying, building, and stealing the necessary military technology to challenge the United States."

In June 2017, while speaking to Assistant Secretary of State for Political-Military Affairs Tina Kaidanow, Rohrabacher said, "We need to go on the record here, in this part of our government, to say that we're not going to be providing weapons systems to Pakistan that we're afraid are going to shoot down our own people. And we know they're engaged in terrorism."

=== Support for Mohiuddin Ahmed ===
In 2007, Rohrabacher supported Mohiuddin Ahmed, a detainee in the U.S., who was said to be involved in an attempted coup in Bangladesh, during which several people were murdered. He was convicted of the assassination of Sheikh Mujibur Rahman, the first President of Bangladesh. Bangladesh's extradition request was halted as Rohrabacher voiced concern about his legal rights, saying that he should be sent somewhere with no death penalty. His support was applauded by both Amnesty International and the U.S. Conference of Catholic Bishops. Mohiuddin Ahmed was found guilty of being a participant in the assassinations and was executed on January 28, 2010.

=== Taiwan ===
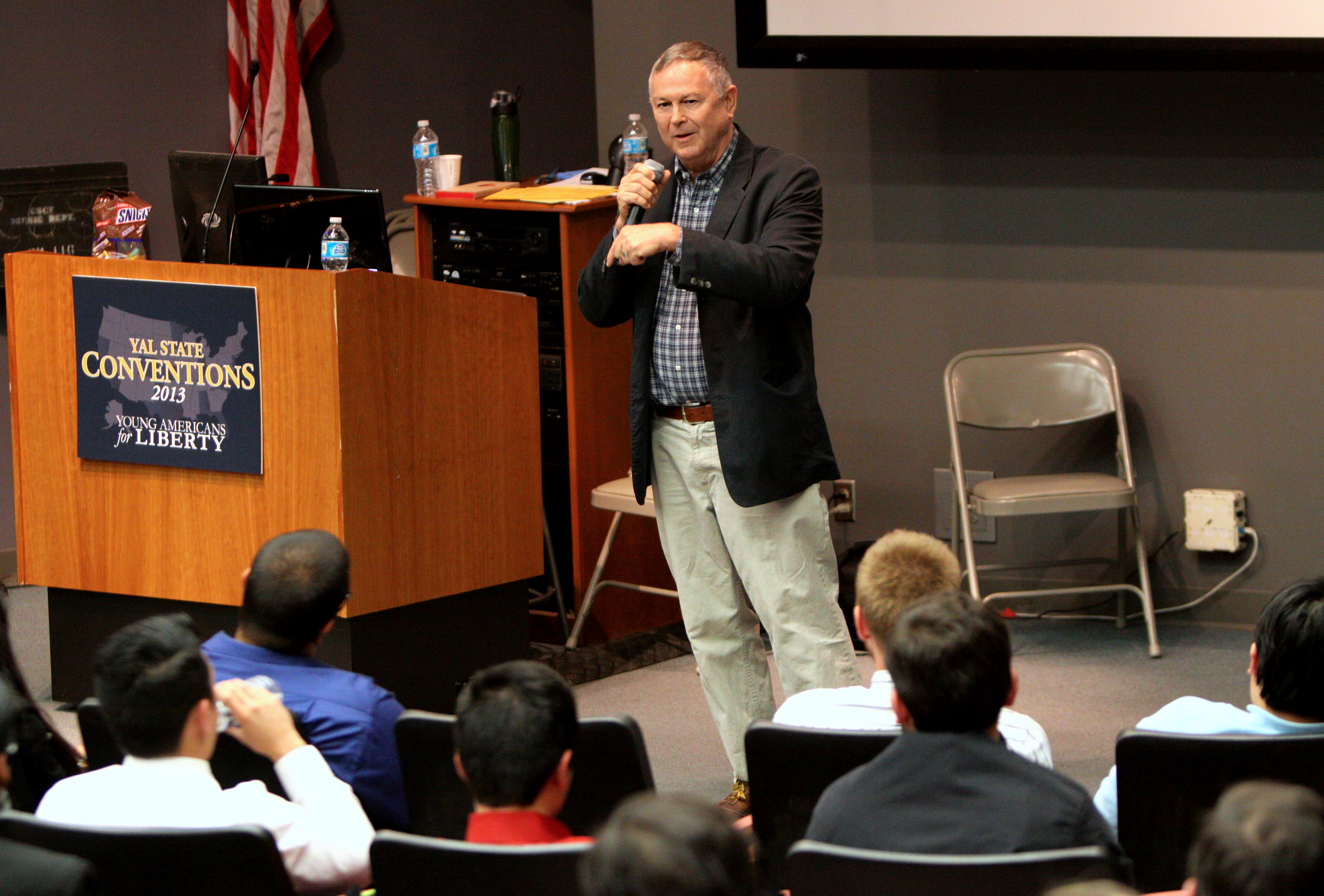
Rohrabacher speaking at the 2013 California Young Americans for Liberty State Convention

After President-elect Donald Trump answered a congratulatory phone call from democratically elected President of Taiwan Tsai Ing-wen on December 2, 2016, Rohrabacher said Trump's phone call with Taiwan's president was "terrific" because of the diplomatic warning it sent to China. "He showed the dictators in Beijing that he's not a pushover." He emphasized, "China has had an enormously aggressive foreign policy and by him actually going to Taiwan, he's showing the people in Beijing that they cannot have this aggressive foreign policy and expect to be treated just the same by an American president."

=== Ukraine ===
Rohrabacher gave a "qualified defense" of the annexation of Crimea by Russia in 2014. On March 6, 2014, he was one of 23 members of the House of Representatives to vote against a $1 billion loan guarantee to support the new government of Ukraine. On March 11, 2014, Rohrabacher voted "present", the only member to do so, on a resolution condemning Russian military actions in Ukraine; the resolution passed 402-7. Commenting on the issue, he stated, "Starting with our own American Revolution, groups of people have declared themselves, rightfully, to be under a different government or a government of their choosing. People forget that's what our Declaration of Independence is all about." He also said, "The sanctions are an abomination of hypocrisy. This is ridiculous: What we were doing with the violence and military action we took to secure the Kosovars' right to self-determination was far more destructive and had far more loss of life than what Putin's done trying to ensure the people of Crimea are not cut off from what they would choose as their destiny with Russia."

=== Uzbekistan ===
During a US Congressional delegation's visit to Uzbekistan in February 2013, Rohrabacher made several controversial statements. The chief among those statements was that the United States should treat Uzbekistan like Saudi Arabia by disregarding the former's human rights abuses in achieving America's national interests, particularly in selling armaments and drones to Uzbekistan.

=== North Macedonia ===
In 2017, in an interview for an Albanian TV channel Vizion Plus Rohrabacher suggested that Macedonia "is not a country" and that the "Kosovars and Albanians from Macedonia should be part of Kosovo and the rest of Macedonia should be part of Bulgaria or any other country to which they believe they are related", which provoked a response from the Macedonian foreign ministry which accused him of inflaming "nationalistic rhetoric".

=== Turkey ===
In the wake of the clashes at the Turkish Ambassador's Residence in May 2017, Rohrabacher called for Donald Trump to never invite Turkish President Recep Tayyip Erdoğan again to the United States, and to bar Americans from purchasing Turkish government debt.

=== Eritrea ===
In August 2017, Rohrabacher proposed amending the Department of Defense budget whereby the United States would establish military ties with Eritrea. Rohrabacher suggested that the two countries should cooperate in fighting the war on terror, curbing Iranian influence in the Yemeni Civil War, and securing the Red Sea region. At the time of Rohrabacher's proposal, Eritrea was subject to international sanctions due to its alleged support of Al-Shabaab in Somalia, and to U.S. sanctions against the Eritrean Navy following an alleged shipment of North Korean military hardware to Eritrea.

=== Julian Assange ===
In August 2017, Rohrabacher attended a meeting in London with Julian Assange organized and attended by right-wing political activist Charles C. Johnson. Rohrabacher said that the discussion was about the possibility of a presidential pardon in exchange for Assange supplying information on the theft of emails from the Democratic National Committee, which were published by WikiLeaks before the 2016 presidential election. In October 2017, Rohrabacher and Johnson met with Senator Rand Paul (R-Kentucky) to discuss Assange supplying information about the source of leaked emails. However, Assange responded to news accounts of the meeting, tweeting, "WikiLeaks never has and never will reveal a source. Offers have been made to me—not the other way around. I do not speak to the public through third parties."

=== Other foreign policy ===
In March 2005, Rohrabacher introduced HR 1061, the American Property Claims Against Ethiopia Act, which would "prohibit United States assistance to the Federal Democratic Republic of Ethiopia until the Ethiopian government returns all property of United States citizens". The bill was introduced by Rohrabacher at the behest of Gebremedhin Berhane, a former Eritrean national and friend of the Rohrabacher family, after his business was expropriated by the Ethiopian government.

On March 7, 2006, Rohrabacher introduced HR 4895, an amendment to the Foreign Assistance Act of 1961, "to limit the provision of the United States military assistance and the sale, transfer, or licensing of United States military equipment or technology to Ethiopia".

During an appearance on MSNBC's The Ed Show, Rohrabacher accused Barack Obama of allowing violence in Iran to get out of hand because he did not speak forcefully enough against the country's leadership. He also said that Gorbachev tore down the Berlin Wall because Reagan told him to ("Tear down this wall").

In early 2010, he went to Honduras to commend the election of the new president. His entourage included a group of Californian property investors and businessmen, a dealer in rare coins, and CEOs from San Diego biofuels corporation (which is headed by a family friend).

== Domestic political positions ==
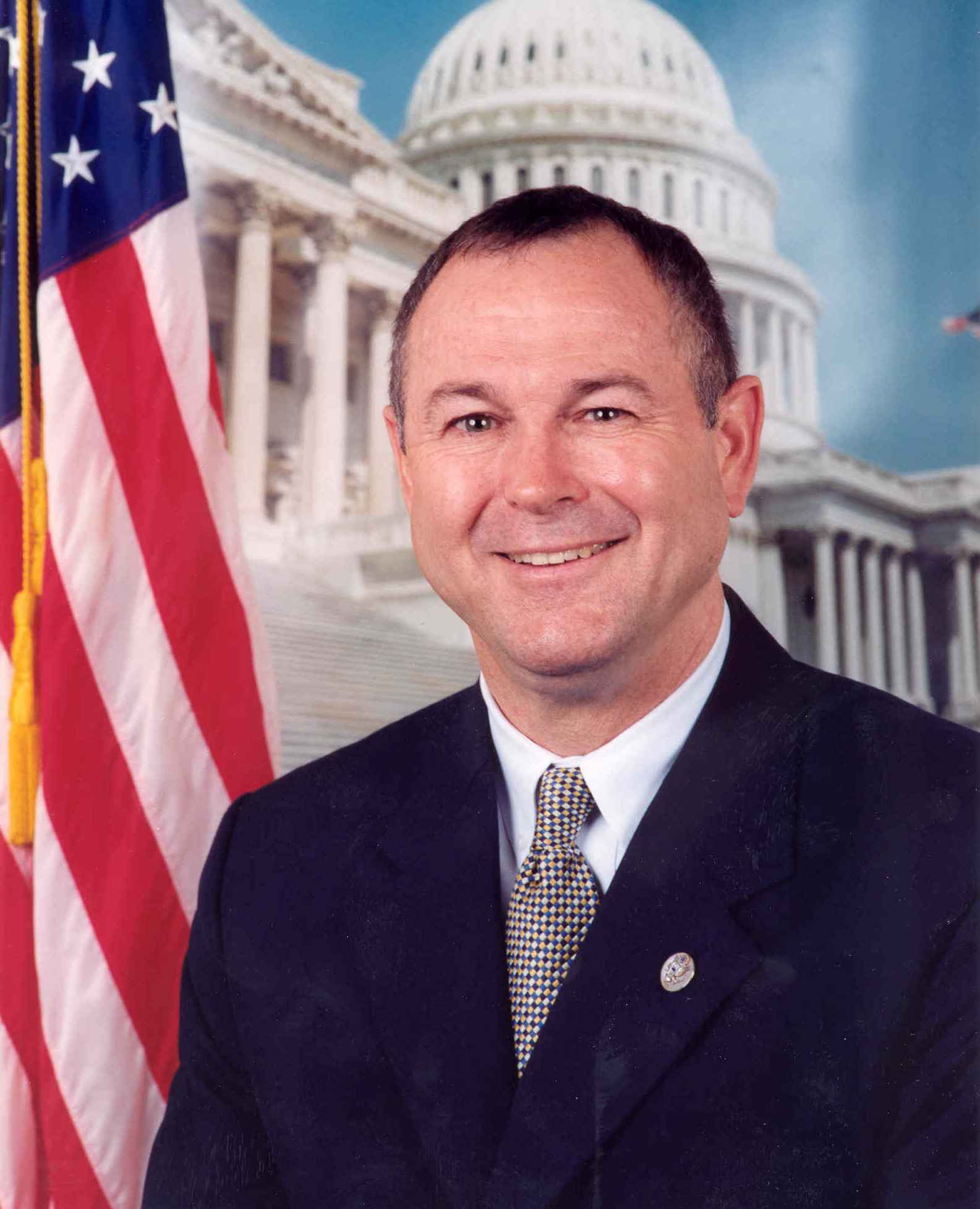
Rohrabacher in 108th Congress, 2003–2004 (age 56).

Rohrabacher voted to repeal Obamacare, disputed evidence of man-made global warming, was a staunch opponent of illegal immigration, and favored the legalization of cannabis.

Rohrabacher had drawn public criticism for some of his positions. His controversial statements included the conspiracy theory, first promoted by the politically-biased conspiracy theory website InfoWars, that Democrats secretly organized the Unite the Right Rally in Charlottesville to provoke violence by the alt-right to discredit President Trump.

He had been a staunch supporter of Donald Trump.

=== National Endowment for the Arts ===
In 1990, Rohrabacher opposed the National Endowment of the Arts and joined Mel Hancock in demanding its abolition. In a February letter to other members of Congress, Rohrabacher sent a photograph by artist and AIDS activist David Wojnarowicz.

In April, liberal constitutional rights group People for the American Way announced its intent to launch a newspaper advert campaign against Rohrabacher. Western vice president of the organization Michael Hudson stated, "'Americans overwhelmingly reject censorship of the arts and support the NEA'". Rohrabacher welcomed the announcement, stating that his constituents "don't want federal dollars to go to sacrilegious or obscene art'" and that it would help voters to understand the issue. Explaining his position, Rohrabacher stated that he did not believe "'anyone should be prevented from seeing what they want to see or painting what they want to paint...on their own time and their own dime. But if you get a government subsidy, that's another question'".

In October, the House passed a bill to reauthorize funds for the NEA with the directive that the organization could not fund obscene art. Rohrabacher introduced an amendment that would include specific guidelines on the kind of art projects that could not be funded, such as works that were sexually explicit or denigrated the American flag or religions; the amendment was rejected by a vote of 249-175. Rohrabacher stated his amendment was supposed to ensure that the federal government was ""not subsidizing obscenity, child pornography, attacks on religion, desecration of the American flag or any other of the outrages we have seen in the past'". By the time the House passed the bill, Rohrabacher had become known as " the House's most outspoken critic of the NEA".

=== Race quotas ===
In October 1991, Rohrabacher wrote a letter to the civil rights division of the Education Department after seven Filipino students complained to the media that they were denied admission to the University of California, San Diego (UCSD). Rohrabacher requested the department conduct a federal civil rights investigation on what seemed to be "a quota based upon race that illegally discriminates against Filipino-Americans and possibly applicants of other races". UCSD vice chancellor for undergraduate affairs Joseph Watson refuted the letter, dismissing Rohrabacher as "wrong when he says that 40% of admissions are reserved for certain races". He stated that the school ranks all applicants using a grade-based formula. Watson charged Rohrabacher with fanning hysteria over discrimination: "The Rohrabacher approach is to play to public fears that something fishy is going on. We don't want anyone to feel we're not giving everyone a fair and equitable review that can stand up to any scrutiny."

=== Impeachment of Bill Clinton ===
In November 1997, Rohrabacher was one of eighteen Republicans in the House to co-sponsor a resolution by Bob Barr that sought to launch an impeachment inquiry against President Bill Clinton. The resolution did not specify any charges or allegations. This was an early effort to impeach Clinton, predating the eruption of the Clinton–Lewinsky scandal. The eruption of that scandal would ultimately lead to a more serious effort to impeach Clinton in 1998. On October 8, 1998, Rohrabacher voted in favor of legislation that was passed to open an impeachment inquiry. On December 19, 1998, Rohrabacher voted in favor of all four proposed articles of impeachment against Clinton (only two of which received the majority of votes needed to be adopted).

=== Firearms ===
In 2018, Sacha Baron Cohen's television program Who Is America? premiered, showing Rohrabacher supporting a hoax "kinderguardians program" which supported training toddlers with firearms. Rohrabacher claims that he never spoke to Cohen, that he was taken out of context, and that he spoke, "broadly of making sure young people could get training in self-defense".

=== Global warming ===
Rohrabacher rejects the scientific consensus that global warming is caused by humans. During a congressional hearing on climate change on February 8, 2007, Rohrabacher mused that previous warming cycles may have been caused by carbon dioxide released into the atmosphere by "dinosaur flatulence": Politico and The New York Times reported that on May 25, 2011, Rohrabacher expressed further skepticism regarding the existence of man-made global warming and suggested that, if global warming is an issue, a possible solution could be clear-cutting rain forests, and replanting. These reports sparked strong criticism by some scientists, including Oliver Phillips, a geography professor at the University of Leeds. They noted the consensus that intact forests act as net absorbers of carbon, reducing global warming.

Rohrabacher does not believe that global warming is a problem. At a town hall meeting with the Newport Mesa Tea Party in August 2013, Rohrabacher said "global warming is a total fraud" and part of a "game plan" by liberals to "create global government".

=== Healthcare ===
On May 4, 2017, Rohrabacher voted in favor of repealing the Patient Protection and Affordable Care Act (Obamacare) and passing the American Health Care Act. During his 2018 re-election campaign, Rohrabacher pledged to protect protections for individuals with preexisting conditions. Rohrabacher voted for his party's Obamacare replacement bill that included state waivers from rules that prohibit charging higher prices to people with pre-existing conditions.

=== Immigration ===
Rohrabacher was an advocate for the state of California's Proposition 187, which prohibited illegal immigrants from acquiring government services. In 2004, he sponsored an amendment that would have prohibited federal reimbursement of hospital-provided emergency care and certain transportation services to undocumented aliens unless the hospital provided information about the aliens' citizenship, immigration status, financial data, and employer to the Secretary of Homeland Security. Aliens who were in the country illegally would receive reimbursement only after they were deported. The proposed bill was defeated, 331–88.

In 2005, Rohrabacher opined that the Republican Party was split on the issue of immigration: "There are those of us who identify with the national wing and patriotic wing of the party who have always been adamant on the illegal immigration issues. And, on the other side, you have those people who believe in the business and global marketplace concept. So, you have a party with two different views on one of the major issues of the day."

In early 2008, Rohrabacher endorsed Mitt Romney in the Republican presidential primary, citing his positions on stemming illegal immigration and criticizing John McCain. About McCain, he said: "He's been the enemy of those of us who have stemmed the flow of illegals into our country, whereas Romney has made some very tough commitments."

In 2011, Rohrabacher proposed the bill H.R. 787 known as the "No Social Security for Illegal Immigrants Act of 2011". The bill: "Amends title II of the Social Security Act to exclude from creditable wages and self-employment income any wages earned for services by aliens performed in the United States, and self-employment income derived from a trade or business conducted in the United States, while the alien was not authorized to be so employed or to perform a function or service in such a trade or business."

In 2013, an 18-year-old student visited Rohrabacher's office to discuss immigration reform. At some point their conversation became disagreeable, and the student said the congressman yelled at her: "I hate illegals!" He also allegedly threatened to deport her family. Rohrabacher's spokesperson has disputed both statements, averring that it was actually the student who started the confrontation by yelling at the spokesperson and telling her to "butt out".

In September 2017, Rohrabacher supported the Trump administration's rescinding of the Deferred Action for Childhood Arrivals program, saying that those "in Congress must work to prevent such cynical loopholes from being created again by executive fiat" despite their possible empathy for the immigrants.

The organization NumbersUSA has given Rep. Rohrabacher an A+ rating in accordance to his stance on illegal immigration.

=== LGBT rights ===
Rohrabacher has drawn controversy over his views on LGBT rights. He opposed same-sex marriage and endorsed Proposition 8, the ballot initiative in 2008 that would have prohibited same-sex marriage in California, during a debate at Orange Coast College, stating he "would suggest not changing the definition of marriage in our society to make a small number of people feel more comfortable".

Rohrabacher voted in favor of the Federal Marriage Amendment in both 2004 and 2006, a proposed amendment to the U.S. Constitution that would have defined marriage as between a man and a woman and forbade states from recognizing or legalizing same-sex marriage. After the Supreme Court issued its decision in Hollingsworth v. Perry in 2013, that legalized same-sex marriage in California, Rohrabacher criticized the decision, stating that the decision was "not based on the merits of the issue but on a technicality". However, Rohrabacher has appeared to have endorsed the idea of leaving marriage to religious institutions only, stating on Twitter that churches should be solely responsible for conducting marriages but that the government should only recognize them.

In May 2018, Rohrabacher provoked severe criticism after telling a meeting of the Orange County Association of Realtors that homeowners "should be able to make a decision not to sell their home to someone (if) they don't agree with their lifestyle." Though the statement did not explicitly refer to LGBT people, it was widely interpreted as such. LGBT groups denounced Rohrabacher for the remarks, and the National Association of Realtors, which had previously donated to Rohrabacher's re-election campaigns, condemned Rohrabacher, halted all of its financial support for him and repudiated its past donations to him. After Rohrabacher's constituents unseated him in favor of Harley Rouda, The Advocate praised the results and condemned Rohrabacher.

Despite criticism from the LGBT community later in his career, early in his political career, Rohrabacher supported a proposal by gays to move to a rural California county and take leadership roles. Rohrabacher's "California Libertarian Alliance endorsed the project. 'Your main resources are the freedom you offer plus the environment you are locating in,' Dana Rohrabacher, one of the libertarian group’s founders and later speechwriter to then-President Reagan, wrote in a letter to GLF. 'The economic goods are perfect for some kind of a combination ski gambling resort.'"

=== Cannabis ===
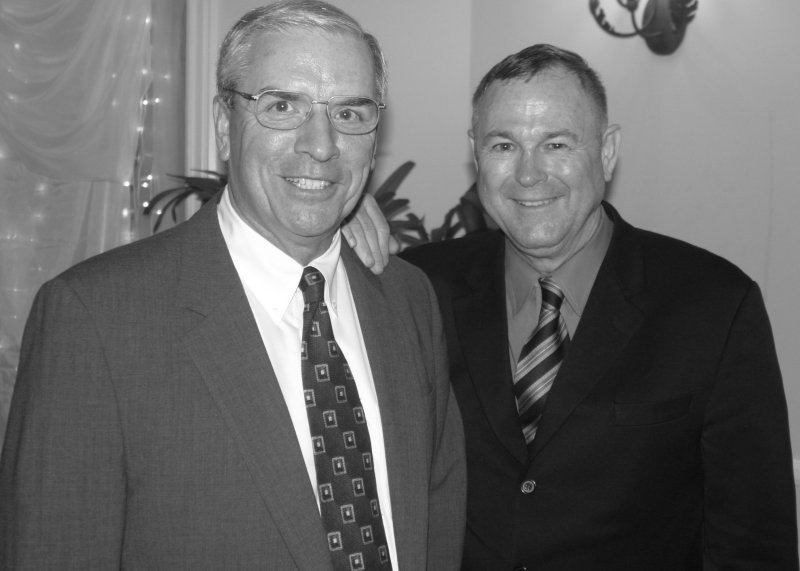
Dana Rohrabacher (right) with Steven T. Kuykendall

Rohrabacher supported the legalization of cannabis for both medical and recreational purposes. He spoke against the policy of cannabis prohibition as early as May 2013, calling it a "colossal failure" in an op-ed penned for the Orange County Register. He further outlined his views in a May 2014 op-ed in National Review, arguing that the prohibition of cannabis has incurred a number of undesirable costs upon free society, such as an increase in gang violence, soaring incarceration rates, unconstitutional seizure of private property through civil forfeiture, corruption and militarization of police forces, and negative impacts on minority communities and relationships with Latin-American countries. Rohrabacher has called on fellow Republicans to reconsider their stance towards cannabis, citing core conservative principles such as limited government, individual liberty, respect for the Tenth Amendment, and respect for the doctor–patient relationship that Rohrabacher says lend support to loosening current laws. He also notes conservative leaders such as Milton Friedman, William F. Buckley Jr., and Grover Norquist that have espoused similar drug policy views. In April 2016, Rohrabacher announced his endorsement of California's Proposition 64, the Adult Use of Marijuana Act.

Rohrabacher is a strong proponent of states' rights when it comes to cannabis policy. He has introduced the Rohrabacher–Farr amendment for a number of years beginning in 2003, to prohibit the Justice Department from spending funds to interfere with the implementation of state medical cannabis laws. The amendment passed the House for the first time in May 2014, becoming law in December 2014 as part of an omnibus spending bill. Additional legislation that Rohrabacher has introduced includes the Respect State Marijuana Laws Act and the Veterans Equal Access Act. Rohrabacher has called on the DEA / DOJ to remove cannabis from the list of Schedule I drugs. In February 2017, Rohrabacher co-founded the Congressional Cannabis Caucus – along with Reps. Don Young (R–AK), Jared Polis (D–CO), and Earl Blumenauer (D–OR) – to help advance policy change regarding cannabis at the federal level.

=== Patent reform ===
Rohrabacher was an opponent of the America Invents Act, a bill that is attempting to change the current Patent System. Rohrabacher opposes changing from a "first to invent system" to a "first to file system" saying it "hurts the little guy". Rohrabacher commented: "Make no mistake, 'first to file' weakens patent protection. It is likely to make vulnerable individual and small inventors, who don't have an army of lawyers on retainer. These 'little guys' have been the lifeblood of American progress and competitiveness for more than 200 years. Our system was designed to protect individual rights, and it has worked for all – not just the corporate elite." Rohrabacher went on to comment in a Politico op-ed: "We're told this is necessary to harmonize with Japanese and European patent law. But those systems were established by elitists and economic shoguns interested in corporate power, not individual rights."

=== Space ===
Rohrabacher was chairman of the Subcommittee on Space and Aeronautics from 1997 to January 2005 and has been active on space-related issues. In 2000, Space.com described Rohrabacher as "a strident advocate for supremacy in space, a philosophy shaped along a winding road from libertarian activist to White House speech writer in the Reagan administration". In 2007, Rohrabacher introduced a bill that would direct NASA to develop a strategy "for deflecting and mitigating potentially hazardous near-Earth objects". Rohrabacher has applauded the Apollo astronauts, calling them unofficial ambassadors. Rohrabacher stated "I applaud their efforts and accomplishments over the past fifty years. And I encourage all Americans to join with me in thanking them for their accomplishments and for the international role they have played in serving as unofficial Ambassadors to the world on our behalf."

On July 18, 2017, Rohrabacher asked a panel of space experts testifying before the House Committee on Science, Space, and Technology if civilizations could have existed on Mars in the past. Kenneth Farley, a project scientist on NASA's Mars Rover 2020 Project, said: "I would say that is extremely unlikely."

=== Tax reform ===
Rohrabacher voted against the Tax Cuts and Jobs Act of 2017. Despite efforts made by Republicans to change the bill to be more generous regarding cap deductions on new home mortgages, Rohrabacher remained staunch at voting nay on the bill, as the more than half of the new mortgages in his district are above the $750,000 cap. He stated on his Facebook page that "Due to the pressure of several members like me, the bill was improved, but not enough for my constituents."

=== 2020 presidential election ===
After leaving office, Rohrabacher participated in "Stop the Steal" rallies in support of Donald Trump. On January 6, 2021, Rohrabacher was filmed breaching a United States Capitol Police barricade during the January 6 United States Capitol attack, although he was not charged with an offense.

== Post-congressional endeavors ==
In May 2019, Rohrabacher announced his appointment to the advisory board of BudTrader.com, a company that provides cannabis-related advertising services.

In December 2018, a month after losing his bid for re-election, Rohrabacher announced that he intended to move to Maine and to write film scripts. In June 2019, he bought a house in York, and announced in a Facebook post on December 25 that he and his family had officially moved to the state, and praised the city's "traditional lifestyle with its colonial/patriot culture and raw natural beauty still intact."

In May 2021, Rohrabacher and his wife hosted an informal gathering of conservative candidates for municipal office in York at their home. In 2022, Rohrabacher endorsed state Rep. Tim Baxter for the Republican nomination for New Hampshire's 1st congressional district. Baxter placed fifth, receiving 9.3% of the vote, losing to Karoline Leavitt. In 2025, Rohrabacher spoke about marijuana legalization at an event hosted by the libertarian-aligned group Free State Project.

== Personal life ==
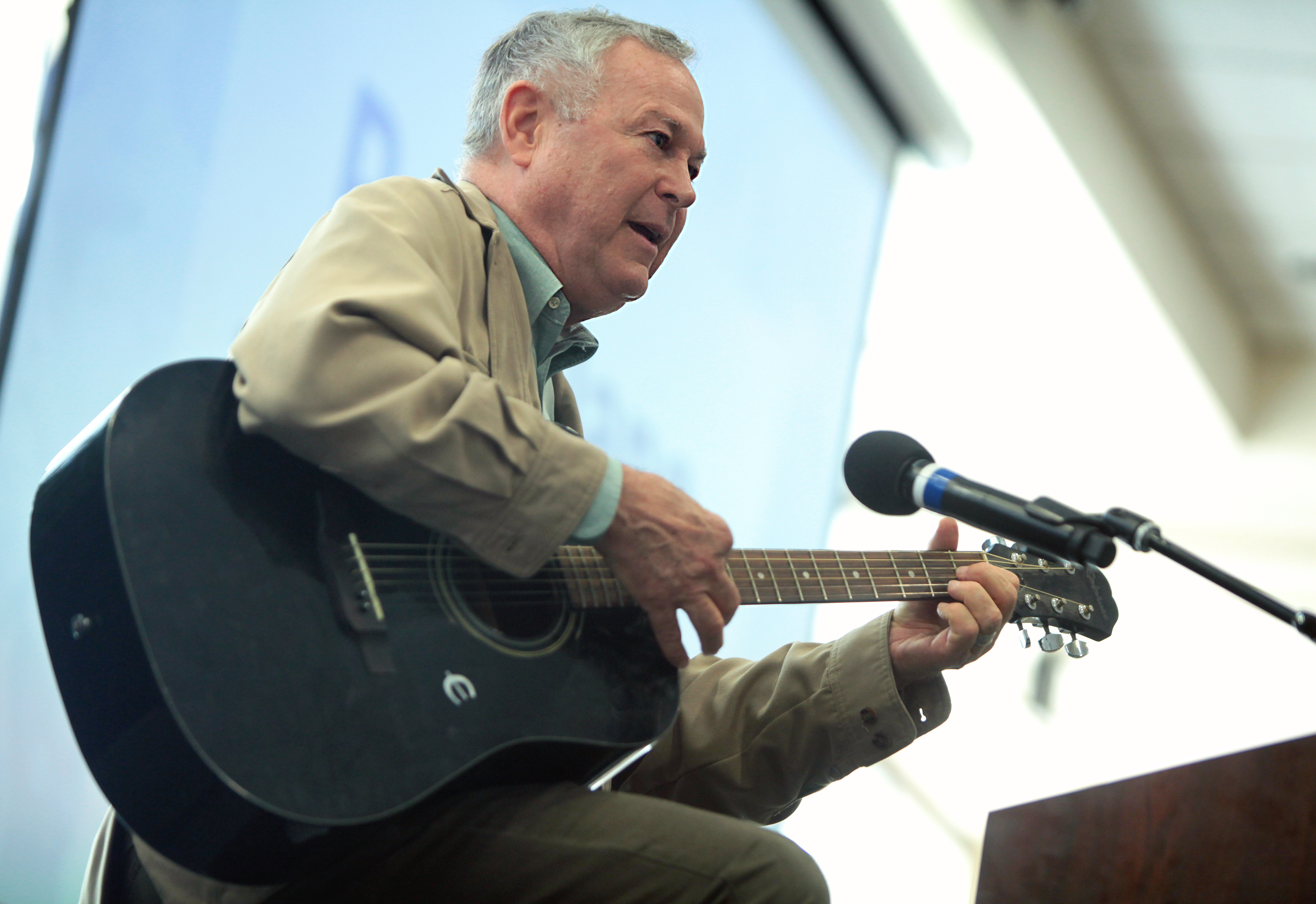
Rohrabacher plays guitar for attendees at the 2016 Young Americans for Liberty California State Convention

Rohrabacher has been married to his wife, Rhonda Carmony, since 1997. In 2004, they became parents of triplets.

Rohrabacher is Protestant. He was described by the Los Angeles Times as "an avid surfer".

Rohrabacher revealed in May 2016 that he uses a cannabis-infused topical rub to treat his arthritis pain, allowing him to sleep through the night.

== Electoral history ==
California's 46th congressional district election, 2008
Party	Candidate	Votes	%
Republican	Dana Rohrabacher (incumbent)	149,818	52.5
Democratic	Debbie Cook	122,891	43.1
Green	Thomas Lash	8,257	2.9
Libertarian	Ernst Gasteiger	4,311	1.5
Total votes		285,277	100
Turnout			70.1
Republican hold			

California's 46th congressional district election, 2010
Party	Candidate	Votes	%
Republican	Dana Rohrabacher (incumbent)	139,822	62.3
Democratic	Ken Arnold	84,940	37.7
Democratic	Jay Shah (write-in)	20	<0.1
Total votes		224,782	100
Republican hold			

California's 48th congressional district election, 2012
Primary election
Party	Candidate	Votes	%
Republican	Dana Rohrabacher (incumbent)	73,302	66.3
Democratic	Ron Varasteh	31,912	28.9
No party preference	Alan Schlar	5,355	4.8
Total votes		110,569	100
General election
Republican	Dana Rohrabacher (incumbent)	177,144	61.0
Democratic	Ron Varasteh	113,358	39.0
Total votes		290,502	100
Republican hold			

California's 48th congressional district election, 2014
Primary election
Party	Candidate	Votes	%
Republican	Dana Rohrabacher (incumbent)	52,431	56.1
Democratic	Suzanne Joyce Savary	18,242	19.5
Republican	Wendy Brooks Leece	11,082	11.9
Democratic	David Burns	6,142	6.6
Democratic	Robert John Banuelos	5,591	6.0
Total votes		93,488	100
General election
Republican	Dana Rohrabacher (incumbent)	112,082	64.1
Democratic	Suzanne Joyce Savary	62,713	35.9
Total votes		174,795	100
Republican hold			

California's 48th congressional district election, 2016
Primary election
Party	Candidate	Votes	%
Republican	Dana Rohrabacher (incumbent)	92,815	56.6
Democratic	Suzanne Savary	47,395	28.9
Democratic	Robert John Banuelos	23,867	14.5
Total votes		164,077	100
General election
Republican	Dana Rohrabacher (incumbent)	178,701	58.5
Democratic	Suzanne Savary	127,715	41.5
Total votes		306,416	100
Republican hold			

California's 48th congressional district election, 2018
Primary election
Party	Candidate	Votes	%
Republican	Dana Rohrabacher (incumbent)	52,737	30.3
Democratic	Harley Rouda	30,099	17.3
Democratic	Hans Keirstead	29,974	17.2
Republican	Scott Baugh	27,514	15.8
Democratic	Omar Siddiqui	8,658	5.0
Republican	John Gabbard	5,664	3.3
Democratic	Rachel Payne (withdrawn)	3,598	2.1
Republican	Paul Martin	2,893	1.7
Republican	Shastina Sandman	2,762	1.6
Democratic	Michael Kotick (withdrawn)	2,606	1.5
Democratic	Laura Oatman (withdrawn)	2,412	1.4
Democratic	Deanie Schaarsmith	1,433	0.8
Democratic	Tony Zarkades	1,281	0.7
Libertarian	Brandon Reiser	964	0.6
Republican	Stelian Onufrei (withdrawn)	739	0.4
No party preference	Kevin Kensinger	690	0.4
Total votes		174,024	100
General election
Democratic	Harley Rouda	157,837	53.6
Republican	Dana Rohrabacher (incumbent)	136,899	46.4
Total votes		294,736	100
Democratic gain from Republican			

== See also ==
- List of federal political scandals in the United States
- Timeline of Russian interference in the 2016 United States elections

U.S. House of Representatives
Preceded by Dan Lungren	Member of the U.S. House of Representatives from California's 42nd congressional district 1989–1993	Succeeded by George Brown
Preceded by Duncan Hunter	Member of the U.S. House of Representatives from California's 45th congressional district 1993–2003	Succeeded by Mary Bono
Preceded by Loretta Sanchez	Member of the U.S. House of Representatives from California's 46th congressional district 2003–2013	Succeeded by Loretta Sanchez
Preceded by John Campbell	Member of the U.S. House of Representatives from California's 48th congressional district 2013–2019	Succeeded by Harley Rouda
U.S. order of precedence (ceremonial)
Preceded by Howard Berman as Former U.S. Representative	Order of precedence of the United States as Former U.S. Representative	Succeeded by Lucille Roybal-Allard as Former U.S. Representative
