= Debbie Cook =

American politician

Deborah Cook
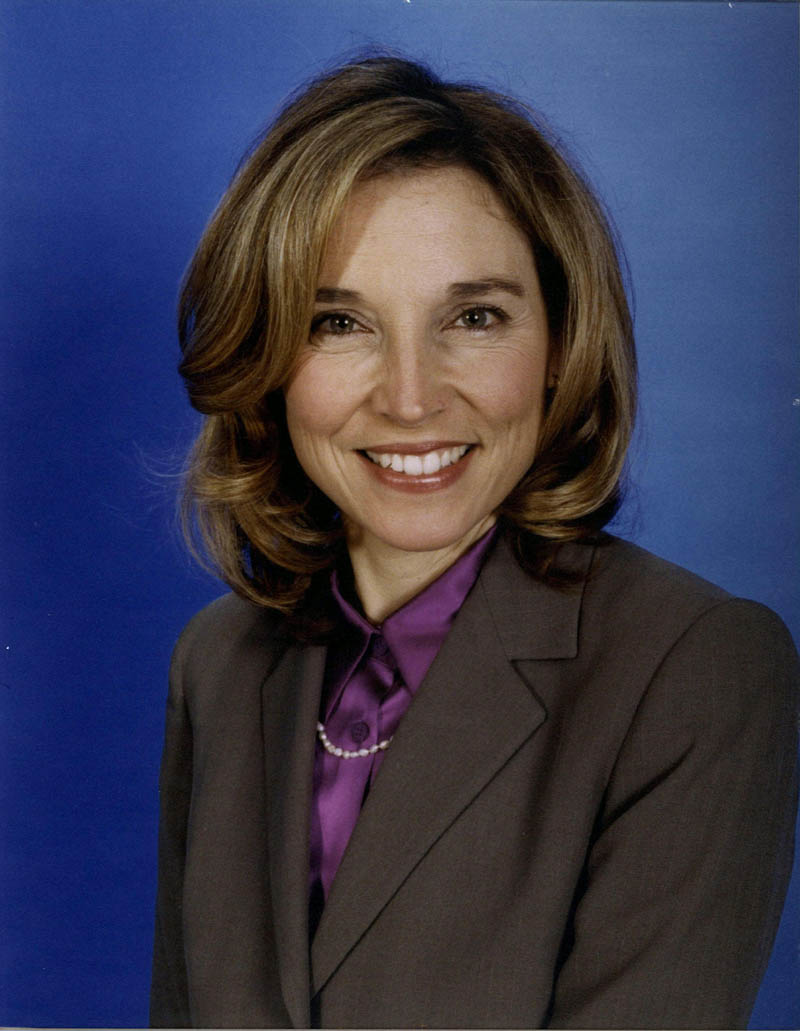
- Cook's official Huntington Beach Council photo, circa 2000-2008

Mayor of Huntington Beach
- In office 2007–2008
- Preceded by: Gil Coerper
- Succeeded by: Keith Bohr
- In office 2001–2002
- Preceded by: Pam Julien-Houchen
- Succeeded by: Connie Boardman

Member of the Huntington Beach City Council
- In office December 1, 2000 – December 1, 2008
- Succeeded by: Devin Dwyer

Personal details
- Born: Deborah Ann Cook; January 22, 1954 (age 72) Corpus Christi, Texas, U.S.
- Party: Democratic
- Spouse: John Fisher
- Education: California State University, Long Beach (BS); Westcliff University (JD)

Deborah Ann Cook (born January 22, 1954) is an American politician and lawyer from California. She is the former mayor of Huntington Beach, California, and was the Democratic nominee for California's 46th congressional district in 2008. Cook was elected to the Huntington Beach City Council in 2000 and re-elected in 2004. She is president of the board of directors of the Post Carbon Institute.

== Early life ==
On January 22, 1954, Cook was born in Corpus Christi, Texas. Cook's father served in the United States Navy in both World War II and the Korean War. Cook's grandfather was an Episcopal minister. Cook was baptized into the Episcopal Church by her grandfather. After Cook's father retired from the Navy, the family moved to Cincinnati, Ohio.

In 1966, Cook and her family moved to California. Cook attended Corona del Mar High School in Newport Beach.

While attending high school, Cook was a runner-up in the Miss Newport Beach contest, earned a student pilot's license, completed an Outward Bound course and successfully climbed Mount Whitney.

== Education ==
Cook graduated from California State University, Long Beach where she studied earth science. She also has a J.D. from Western State University College of Law.

In May 2005, Cook received an honorary Associate of Arts degree from Orange Coast College.

== Career ==
Cook coached and taught volleyball in Huntington Beach, and served as P.T.A. president for Vista View School in Fountain Valley. In 1978 Debbie and her husband John Fisher purchased a small office-equipment business which they ran for 14 years. During those years Cook obtained a patent for the business's shelving system.

As a political novice in 1990, Cook was the main force behind the Huntington Beach city voter initiative Measure C, a pro-environment City Charter amendment that forbids sale or lease of park or beach land without a citywide vote. Despite the city council majority's opposition to the initiative, voters approved it.

In December 1994, Cook was admitted to the California bar. She served as attorney for the Bolsa Chica Land Trust, and took part in the efforts to preserve the Bolsa Chica Wetlands from development.

In 2000, Cook was elected to the Huntington Beach city council. In 2001 she became mayor of Huntington Beach; this office is a rotating position within the city council. Cook was re-elected to the council in 2004.

She also has served as President of the Orange County Division of the League of California Cities, Chair of the League of California Cities Administrative Policy Committee and Chair of the Orange County Parks Commission. Cook helped lead the fight to prevent the Orange County Sanitation District from massive dumping of partially treated wastewater into the ocean. In 2007, Huntington Beach joined the U.S. Mayor's Agreement on Global Warming.

=== 2008 campaign for Congress ===
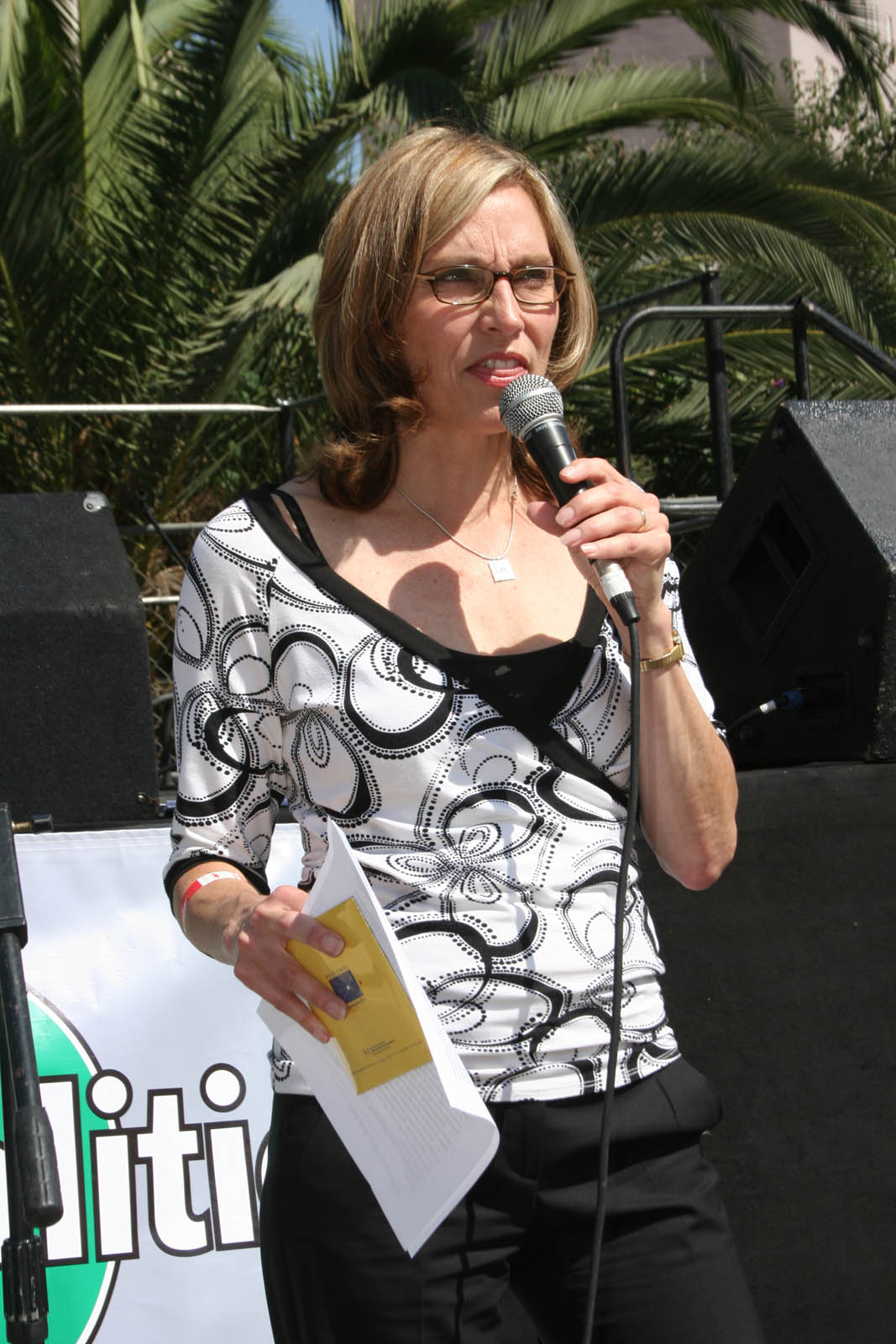
Huntington Beach Mayor and 2008 Democratic candidate for California's 46th congressional district Debbie Cook speaks at the Beer & Politics event at University by the Sea on October 5, 2008.

On February 2, 2008, Debbie Cook announced her candidacy for the Democratic nomination in California's 46th congressional district against incumbent Republican Dana Rohrabacher. Cook defeated Huntington Beach business owner Dan Kalmick in the June 3, 2008 primary.

The Treasurer of the California Republican Party filed suit against Cook and the Orange County Registrar regarding Cook's ballot designation. It was dismissed by California's Fourth District Court of Appeal as frivolous and politically motivated.

According to FEC reports, Cook outraised Rohrabacher in the first and second quarters of 2008, although Rohrabacher in total had raised $323,966 compared to Cook's $157,269 by the end of the second quarter 2008. In the end, Cook failed to oust the incumbent, winning only 42.4% of the vote to Rohrabacher's 53.2%.

== Personal life ==
In 1975, Cook married John Fisher. They have one son. In 1986, Cook and her family moved to Huntington Beach.
