= California's 46th congressional district =

U.S. House district for California

Coordinates: 33.72°N 118.04°W

- Interactive map of district boundaries
- Representative: Lou Correa; D–Santa Ana
- Population (2025): 748,469
- Median household income: $97,960
- Ethnicity: 65.2% Hispanic; 15.4% Asian; 14.8% White; 1.9% Two or more races; 1.8% Black; 0.9% other
- Cook PVI: D+11

California's 46th congressional district is a congressional district in the U.S. state of California.

It has been represented by Democrat Lou Correa since 2017, when he succeeded Loretta Sanchez, who retired to run for the U.S. Senate. The district is based in Orange County and includes the communities of Anaheim, Santa Ana, and Stanton, as well as parts of Orange and Fullerton. It is both the most Democratic-leaning and most Latino congressional district in Orange County.

The congressional district contains the theme park Disneyland and Angel Stadium.

From 2003 to 2013 the district covered part of Los Angeles County and Orange County. It included Huntington Beach, Costa Mesa and Rancho Palos Verdes.

== Recent election results from statewide races ==
=== 2023–2027 boundaries ===
Year	Office	Results
2008	President	Obama 60% - 40%
2010	Governor	Brown 52% - 40%
2010	Lt. Governor	Newsom 46% - 39%
2010	Secretary of State	Bowen 51% - 38%
2010	Attorney General	Harris 44.3% - 43.8%
2010	Treasurer	Lockyer 54% - 36%
2010	Controller	Chiang 48% - 38%
2012	President	Obama 64% - 36%
2014	Governor	Brown 60% - 40%
2016	President	Clinton 67% - 27%
2018	Governor	Newsom 65% - 35%
2018	Attorney General	Becerra 67% - 33%
2020	President	Biden 64% - 34%
2022	Senate (Reg.)	Padilla 61% - 39%
2022	Governor	Newsom 60% - 40%
2022	Lt. Governor	Kounalakis 60% - 40%
2022	Secretary of State	Weber 60% - 40%
2022	Attorney General	Bonta 59% - 41%
2022	Treasurer	Ma 57% - 43%
2022	Controller	Cohen 58% - 42%
2024	President	Harris 57% - 40%
2024	Senate (Reg.)	Schiff 59% - 41%

=== 2027–2033 boundaries ===
Year	Office	Results
2008	President	Obama 60% - 40%
2010	Governor	Brown 52% - 40%
2010	Lt. Governor	Newsom 46% - 39%
2010	Secretary of State	Bowen 51% - 38%
2010	Attorney General	Harris 44.3% - 43.8%
2010	Treasurer	Lockyer 54% - 36%
2010	Controller	Chiang 48% - 38%
2012	President	Obama 64% - 36%
2014	Governor	Brown 60% - 40%
2016	President	Clinton 67% - 27%
2018	Governor	Newsom 65% - 35%
2018	Attorney General	Becerra 67% - 33%
2020	President	Biden 64% - 34%
2022	Senate (Reg.)	Padilla 61% - 39%
2022	Governor	Newsom 60% - 40%
2022	Lt. Governor	Kounalakis 60% - 40%
2022	Secretary of State	Weber 60% - 40%
2022	Attorney General	Bonta 59% - 41%
2022	Treasurer	Ma 57% - 43%
2022	Controller	Cohen 58% - 42%
2024	President	Harris 57% - 40%
2024	Senate (Reg.)	Schiff 59% - 41%

== Composition ==
FIPS County Code	County	Seat	Population
59	Orange	Santa Ana	3,135,755

Under the 2020 redistricting, California's 38th congressional district is located entirely within western Orange County in Southern California. It includes the cities of Santa Ana, Stanton, most of Anaheim, southern Fullerton, and western Orange.

Orange County is split between this district, the 40th district, the 45th district, and the 47th district. The 46th and 40th are partitioned by E La Palma Ave, E Jackson Ave, E Frontera St, Santa Ana River, Riverside Freeway, Costa Mesa Freeway, N Tustin St, E Meats Ave, N Orange Olive Rd, Garden Grove Freeway, 16909 Donwest-16791 E Main St, E Chestnut Ave, 16282 E Main St-717 S Lyon St, E McFadden Ave, Warner Ave, and Red Hill Ave.

The 46th, 45th, and 47th are partitioned by Red Hill Ave, E Alton Parkway, Costa Mesa Freeway, Sunflower Ave, Harbor Blvd, MacArthur Blvd, Santa Ana River, W Lehnhardt Ave, Gloxinia Ave, Lilac Way, Edinger Ave, Pebble Ct, 10744 W Lehnhardt Ave-10726 Kedge Ave, 724 S Sail St-5641 W Barbette Ave-407 S Starboard St, Starboard St/S Cooper St, Taft St, Hazard Ave, N Euclid St, Westminster Ave, Clinton St, 14300 Clinton St-1001 Mar Les Dr, Mar Les Dr, 2729 Huckleberry Rd, N Fairview St, Fairview St, 13462 Garden Grove Blvd-13252 Marty Ln, Townley St/Siemon Ave, W Garden Grove Blvd, S Lewis St, W Chapman Ave, E Simmons Ave, S Haster St, Ascot Dr, W Orangewood Ave, S 9th St, 2209 S Waverly Dr-11751 S Waverly Dr, Euclid St, Haven Ln, W Dudley Ave, S Euclid St, Katella Ave, Dale St, Rancho Alamitos High School, Orangewood Ave, Barber City Channel, Arrowhead St, Del Rey Dr, Westcliff Dr, Lampson Ave, Fern St, Garden Glove Blvd, Union Pacific Railroad, 7772 W Chapman Ave-Bently Ave, Highway 39, Western Ave, Stanton Storm Channel, Knott Ave, 6970 Via Kannela-6555 Katella Ave, Cerritos Ave, 10490 Carlotta Ave-Ball Rd, John Beat Park, S Knott Ave, Solano Dr, Monterra Way, Campesina Dr, Holder Elementary School, W Orange Ave, 6698 Via Riverside Way-Orangeview Junior High School, W Lincoln Ave, 195 N Western Ave-298 N Western Ave, 3181 W Coolidge Ave-405 N Dale St, W Crescent Ave, N La Reina St, W La Palma Ave, Boisseranc Park, I-5 HOV Lane, Orangethorpe Ave, Fullerton Creek, Whitaker St, Commonwealth Ave, Los Angeles County Metro, W Malvern Ave, W Chapman Ave, E Chapman Ave, S Placentia Ave, Kimberly Ave, E Orangethorpe Ave, and 2500 E Terrace St-Highway 57.

=== Cities and CDPs with 10,000 or more people ===
- Anaheim - 346,824
- Santa Ana - 306,457
- Fullerton - 143,617
- Orange - 139,911
- Stanton - 37,962

== List of members representing the district ==
Member	Party	Dates	Cong ress(es)	Electoral history	Counties
District created January 3, 1993
Bob Dornan (Garden Grove)	Republican	January 3, 1993 – January 3, 1997	103rd 104th	Redistricted from the 38th district and re-elected in 1992. Re-elected in 1994. Lost re-election.	1993–2003; Orange (Garden Grove, Santa Ana)
Loretta Sanchez (Anaheim)	Democratic	January 3, 1997 – January 3, 2003	105th 106th 107th	Elected in 1996. Re-elected in 1998. Re-elected in 2000. Redistricted to the 47th district.	1993–2003; Orange (Garden Grove, Santa Ana)
Dana Rohrabacher (Costa Mesa)	Republican	January 3, 2003 – January 3, 2013	108th 109th 110th 111th 112th	Redistricted from the 45th district and re-elected in 2002. Re-elected in 2004. Re-elected in 2006. Re-elected in 2008. Re-elected in 2010. Redistricted to the 48th district.	2003–2013 Los Angeles (Long Beach, Palos Verdes), Orange (Huntington Beach)
Loretta Sanchez (Santa Ana)	Democratic	January 3, 2013 – January 3, 2017	113th 114th	Redistricted from the 47th district and re-elected in 2012. Re-elected in 2014. Retired to run for U.S. Senator.	2013–2023 Orange County (Anaheim and Santa Ana)
Lou Correa (Santa Ana)	Democratic	January 3, 2017 – present	115th 116th 117th 118th 119th	Elected in 2016. Re-elected in 2018. Re-elected in 2020. Re-elected in 2022. Re-elected in 2024. Re-elected in 2026.	2013–2023 Orange County (Anaheim and Santa Ana)
Lou Correa (Santa Ana)	Democratic	January 3, 2017 – present	115th 116th 117th 118th 119th	Elected in 2016. Re-elected in 2018. Re-elected in 2020. Re-elected in 2022. Re-elected in 2024. Re-elected in 2026.	2023–present Orange County (Anaheim and Santa Ana)

== Election results ==
=== 1992 ===
1992 United States House of Representatives elections in California
Party	Candidate	Votes	%
Republican	Bob Dornan (Incumbent)	55,659	50.2
Democratic	Robert John Banuelos	45,435	41.0
Libertarian	Richard G. Newhouse	9,712	8.8
Total votes		110,806	100.0
Republican hold			

=== 1994 ===
1994 United States House of Representatives elections in California
Party	Candidate	Votes	%
Republican	Bob Dornan (Incumbent)	50,616	57.1
Democratic	Michael P. "Mike" Farber	33,004	37.2
Libertarian	Richard G. Newhouse	5,077	5.7
Total votes		88,697	100.0
Republican hold			

=== 1996 ===
1996 United States House of Representatives elections in California
Party	Candidate	Votes	%
Democratic	Loretta Sanchez	47,964	46.9
Republican	Bob Dornan (Incumbent)	46,980	45.9
Reform	Lawrence Stafford	3,235	3.1
Libertarian	Thomas Reimer	2,333	2.2
Natural Law	J. Aguirre	1,972	1.9
Total votes		102,484	100.0
Democratic gain from Republican			

=== 1998 ===
1998 United States House of Representatives elections in California
Party	Candidate	Votes	%
Democratic	Loretta Sanchez (Incumbent)	47,964	56.4
Republican	Bob Dornan	33,388	39.3
Libertarian	Thomas E. Reimer	2,316	2.7
Natural Law	Larry G. Engwall	1,334	1.6
Total votes		85,002	100.0
Democratic hold			

=== 2000 ===
2000 United States House of Representatives elections in California
Party	Candidate	Votes	%
Democratic	Loretta Sanchez (Incumbent)	70,381	60.3
Republican	Gloria Matta Tuchman	40,928	35.0
Libertarian	Richard B. Boddie	3,159	2.7
Natural Law	Larry Engwall	2,440	2.0
Total votes		116,908	100.0
Democratic hold			

=== 2002 ===
2002 United States House of Representatives elections in California
Party	Candidate	Votes	%
Republican	Dana Rohrabacher (Incumbent)	108,807	61.8
Democratic	Gerrie Schipske	60,890	34.6
Libertarian	Keith Gann	6,488	3.6
Independent	Thomas Lash (write-in)	80	0.0
Total votes		176,165	100.0
Republican hold			

=== 2004 ===
2004 United States House of Representatives elections in California
Party	Candidate	Votes	%
Republican	Dana Rohrabacher (Incumbent)	171,318	62.0
Democratic	Jim Brandt	90,129	32.5
Green	Tom Lash	10,238	3.7
Total votes		271,685	100.0
Republican hold			

=== 2006 ===
2006 United States House of Representatives elections in California
Party	Candidate	Votes	%
Republican	Dana Rohrabacher (Incumbent)	116,176	59.6
Democratic	Jim Brandt	71,573	36.7
Libertarian	Dennis Chang	7,303	3.7
Total votes		195,052	100.0
Republican hold			

=== 2008 ===
2008 United States House of Representatives elections in California
Party	Candidate	Votes	%
Republican	Dana Rohrabacher (Incumbent)	149,818	52.5
Democratic	Debbie Cook	122,891	43.1
Green	Thomas Lash	8,257	2.9
Libertarian	Ernst P. Gasteiger	4,311	1.5
Total votes		285,277	100.0
Republican hold			

=== 2010 ===
2010 United States House of Representatives elections in California
Party	Candidate	Votes	%
Republican	Dana Rohrabacher (Incumbent)	139,822	62.2
Democratic	Ken Arnold	84,940	37.8
Total votes		224,762	100.0
Republican hold			

=== 2012 ===
2012 United States House of Representatives elections in California
Party	Candidate	Votes	%
Democratic	Loretta Sanchez (Incumbent)	95,694	63.9
Republican	Jerry Hayden	54,121	36.1
Total votes		149,815	100.0
Democratic hold			

=== 2014 ===
2014 United States House of Representatives elections in California
Party	Candidate	Votes	%
Democratic	Loretta Sanchez (Incumbent)	49,738	59.7
Republican	Adam Nick	33,577	40.3
Total votes		83,315	100.0
Democratic hold			

=== 2016 ===
2016 United States House of Representatives elections in California
Party	Candidate	Votes	%
Democratic	Lou Correa	115,248	70.0
Democratic	Bao Nguyen	49,345	30.0
Total votes		164,593	100.0
Democratic hold			

=== 2018 ===
2018 United States House of Representatives elections in California
Party	Candidate	Votes	%
Democratic	Lou Correa (Incumbent)	102,278	69.1
Republican	Russell Rene Lambert	45,638	30.9
Total votes		147,916	100.0
Democratic hold			

=== 2020 ===
2020 United States House of Representatives elections in California
Party	Candidate	Votes	%
Democratic	Lou Correa (incumbent)	157,803	68.8
Republican	James S. Waters	71,716	31.2
Total votes		229,519	100.0
Democratic hold			

=== 2022 ===
2022 United States House of Representatives elections in California
Party	Candidate	Votes	%
Democratic	Lou Correa (incumbent)	78,041	61.8
Republican	Christopher Gonzales	48,257	38.2
Total votes		126,298	100.0
Democratic hold			

=== 2024 ===
2024 United States House of Representatives elections in California
Party	Candidate	Votes	%
Democratic	Lou Correa (incumbent)	134,103	63.4
Republican	David Pan	77,279	36.6
Total votes		211,292	100.0
Democratic hold			

== Historical district boundaries ==
=== 2003-13 ===
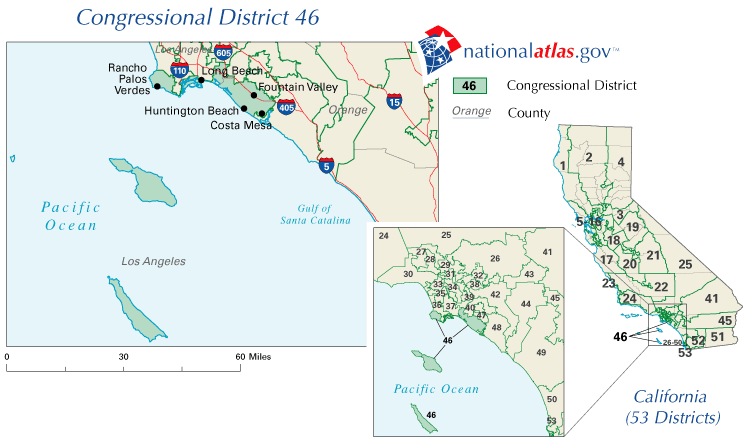
The 2003–2013 iteration of the district was commonly considered to be typical of gerrymandering. It covered some or all of the following cities in Orange County: Costa Mesa, Fountain Valley, Huntington Beach, Los Alamitos, Seal Beach, and Westminster. In Los Angeles County, the district covered Rancho Palos Verdes, Rolling Hills, Rolling Hills Estates, Palos Verdes Estates part of Long Beach, and a very small portion of the San Pedro neighborhood of the City of Los Angeles, and Santa Catalina Island, on which Avalon was the only city. The district also included the whole of the Port of Los Angeles and Long Beach.

=== 2013-23 ===
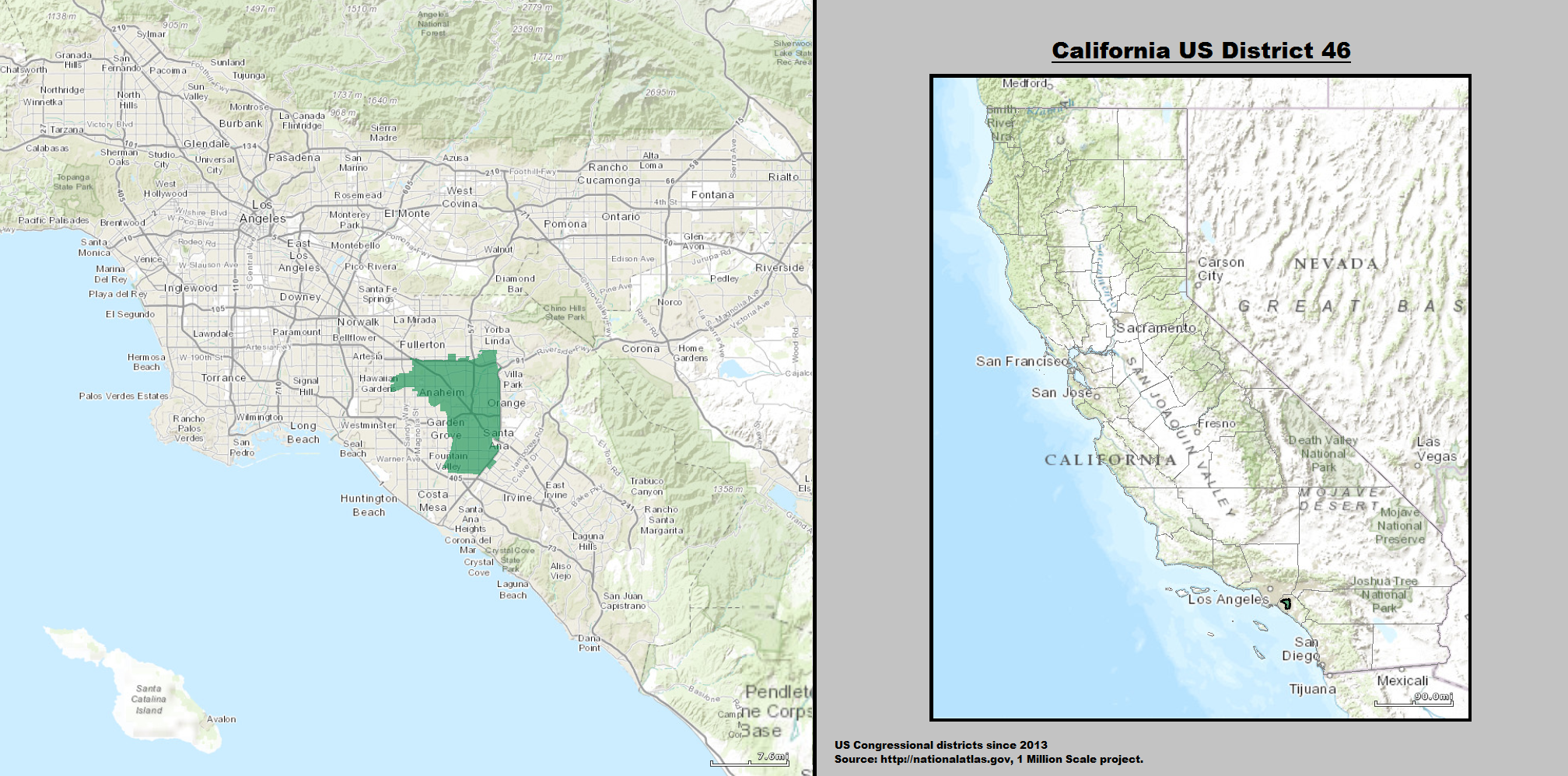
Due to redistricting after the 2010 United States census, the district moved East to parts of Orange County such as Anaheim and Santa Ana.

== See also ==
- List of United States congressional districts
- California's congressional districts
