= Muhammad Zahir Shah =

Pakistani politician

Provincial Minister of Khyber Pakhtunkhwa for Food
- In office 6 March 2024 – 13 October 2025
- Chief Minister: Ali Amin Gandapur

Member of the Provincial Assembly of Khyber Pakhtunkhwa
- Incumbent
- Assumed office 29 February 2024
- Constituency: PK-57 Mardan-IV
- In office 13 August 2018 – 18 January 2023
- Constituency: PK-52 (Mardan-V)

Personal details
- Born: 14 February 1962 (age 64)
- Party: PTI (2018-present)

Muhammad Zahir Shah Toru (born 14 February 1962) is a Pakistani politician who served as the Provincial Minister of Khyber Pakhtunkhwa for Food from 6 March 2024 to 13 October 2025. A member of the Provincial Assembly of Khyber Pakhtunkhwa since 28 February 2024, he was elected as a Pakistan Tehreek-e-Insaf (PTI)-backed independent candidate from PK-57 Mardan-IV in the 2024 Pakistani general election.

== Early life and education ==
Toru was born on 14 February 1962. He earned his M.Sc. in Agriculture from University of Agriculture, Peshawar in 1990.

== Political career ==
Toru was elected to the Provincial Assembly of Khyber Pakhtunkhwa as a candidate of Pakistan Tehreek-e-Insaf (PTI) from Constituency PK-52 (Mardan-V) in the 2018 Pakistani general election.

He was re-elected to the Provincial Assembly of Khyber Pakhtunkhwa as a PTI-backed independent candidate from Constituency PK-57 Mardan-IV in the 2024 Pakistani general election. He received 34,437 votes and defeleated Ahmad Khan, a candidate of Awami National Party who secured 16,237 votes.

On 6 March 2024, he was appointed as the Provincial Minister of Khyber Pakhtunkhwa for Food in the Khyber Pakhtunkhwa provincial cabinet of Chief Minister Ali Amin Gandapur. His tenure as food minister ended on 8 October 2025 following the resignation of Chief Minister Ali Amin Gandapur, which led to the dissolution of the provincial cabinet.
