= 2020 United States House of Representatives elections in California =

- November 3, 2020

All 53 California seats to the United States House of Representatives
- Turnout: 75.85% ▲
	Majority party	Minority party
Party	Democratic	Republican
Last election	46	7
Seats before	45	8
Seats won	42	11
Seat change	▼3	▲3
Popular vote	11,083,766	5,640,188
Percentage	66.27%	33.73%
Swing	▲0.53%	▲1.12%

Democratic hold
Republican hold Republican gain
Democratic
50–60%
60–70%
70–80%
80–90%
90–100%
Republican
50–60%
60–70%
70–80%

The 2020 United States House of Representatives elections in California were held on November 3, 2020, to elect the 53 U.S. representatives from the state of California, one from each of the state's 53 congressional districts. The elections coincided with the 2020 U.S. presidential election, as well as other elections to the United States House of Representatives, elections to the United States Senate, and various state and local elections.

This is the first general election since 1994 in which a Republican defeated an incumbent House Democrat in California. This year, despite the statewide dominance by Democratic presidential nominee Joe Biden, a record-breaking number of Republicans defeated Democratic House incumbents: Young Kim defeated Gil Cisneros in District 39, Michelle Park Steel defeated Harley Rouda in District 48, and David Valadao defeated TJ Cox in District 21 to reclaim his old seat. This happened even as Democrats won the statewide combined House vote by a wider margin than Biden. Mike Garcia also defeated Christy Smith in District 25 to retain the seat he flipped in the May 12 special election to fill the seat vacated by Katie Hill.

== Overview ==
United States House of Representatives elections in California, 2020 Primary election — March 3, 2020
Party	Votes	Percentage	Candidates	Advancing to general	Seats contesting
Democratic	5,989,781	65.65	124	60	53
Republican	2,973,937	32.60	96	46	46
No party preference	99,842	1.09	22	0	0
Green	38,524	0.42	4	0	0
American Independent	11,271	0.12	3	0	0
Libertarian	7,985	0.09	2	0	0
Peace and Freedom	1,821	0.02	1	0	0
Totals	9,123,161	100.00	252	106	—

District	Democratic		Republican		Total		Result
District	Votes	%	Votes	%	Votes	%	Result
District 1	154,073	43.01%	204,190	56.99%	358,263	100.0%	Republican hold
District 2	294,435	75.74%	94,320	24.26%	388,755	100.0%	Democratic hold
District 3	176,036	54.67%	145,941	45.33%	321,977	100.0%	Democratic hold
District 4	194,731	44.05%	247,291	55.95%	442,022	100.0%	Republican hold
District 5	271,233	76.09%	85,227	23.91%	356,460	100.0%	Democratic hold
District 6	229,648	73.34%	83,466	26.66%	313,114	100.0%	Democratic hold
District 7	217,416	56.62%	166,549	43.38%	383,965	100.0%	Democratic hold
District 8	124,400	43.94%	158,711	56.06%	283,111	100.0%	Republican hold
District 9	174,252	57.58%	128,358	42.42%	302,610	100.0%	Democratic hold
District 10	166,865	55.16%	135,629	44.84%	302,494	100.0%	Democratic hold
District 11	271,063	72.99%	100,293	27.01%	371,356	100.0%	Democratic hold
District 12	362,950	100.00%	0	0.00%	362,950	100.0%	Democratic hold
District 13	327,863	90.37%	34,955	9.63%	362,818	100.0%	Democratic hold
District 14	278,227	79.29%	72,684	20.71%	350,911	100.0%	Democratic hold
District 15	242,991	70.90%	99,710	29.10%	342,701	100.0%	Democratic hold
District 16	128,690	59.38%	88,039	40.62%	216,729	100.0%	Democratic hold
District 17	212,137	71.35%	85,199	28.65%	297,336	100.0%	Democratic hold
District 18	344,127	100.00%	0	0.00%	344,127	100.0%	Democratic hold
District 19	224,385	71.68%	88,642	28.32%	313,027	100.0%	Democratic hold
District 20	236,896	76.78%	71,658	23.22%	308,554	100.0%	Democratic hold
District 21	84,406	49.55%	85,928	50.45%	170,334	100.0%	Republican gain
District 22	144,251	45.77%	170,888	54.23%	315,139	100.0%	Republican hold
District 23	115,896	37.86%	190,222	62.14%	306,118	100.0%	Republican hold
District 24	212,564	58.66%	149,781	41.34%	362,345	100.0%	Democratic hold
District 25	169,305	49.95%	169,638	50.05%	338,943	100.0%	Republican hold
District 26	208,856	60.58%	135,877	39.42%	344,733	100.0%	Democratic hold
District 27	221,411	69.78%	95,907	30.22%	317,318	100.0%	Democratic hold
District 28	244,471	72.67%	91,928	27.33%	336,399	100.0%	Democratic hold
District 29	210,944	100.00%	0	0.00%	210,944	100.0%	Democratic hold
District 30	240,038	69.48%	105,426	30.52%	345,464	100.0%	Democratic hold
District 31	175,315	61.29%	110,735	38.71%	286,050	100.0%	Democratic hold
District 32	172,942	66.58%	86,818	33.42%	259,760	100.0%	Democratic hold
District 33	257,094	67.58%	123,334	32.42%	380,428	100.0%	Democratic hold
District 34	205,346	100.00%	0	0.00%	205,346	100.0%	Democratic hold
District 35	169,405	69.33%	74,941	30.67%	244,346	100.0%	Democratic hold
District 36	185,051	60.34%	121,640	39.66%	306,691	100.0%	Democratic hold
District 37	254,916	85.94%	41,705	14.06%	296,621	100.0%	Democratic hold
District 38	256,206	100.00%	0	0.00%	256,206	100.0%	Democratic hold
District 39	169,837	49.40%	173,946	50.60%	343,783	100.0%	Republican gain
District 40	135,572	72.74%	50,809	27.26%	186,381	100.0%	Democratic hold
District 41	167,938	64.04%	94,289	35.96%	262,227	100.0%	Democratic hold
District 42	157,773	42.87%	210,274	57.13%	368,047	100.0%	Republican hold
District 43	199,210	71.68%	78,688	28.32%	277,898	100.0%	Democratic hold
District 44	206,036	100.00%	0	0.00%	206,036	100.0%	Democratic hold
District 45	221,843	53.46%	193,096	46.54%	414,939	100.0%	Democratic hold
District 46	157,803	68.75%	71,716	31.25%	229,519	100.0%	Democratic hold
District 47	197,028	63.27%	114,371	36.73%	311,399	100.0%	Democratic hold
District 48	193,362	48.94%	201,738	51.06%	395,100	100.0%	Republican gain
District 49	205,349	53.13%	181,157	46.87%	386,506	100.0%	Democratic hold
District 50	166,859	46.05%	195,510	53.95%	362,369	100.0%	Republican hold
District 51	165,596	68.30%	76,841	31.70%	242,437	100.0%	Democratic hold
District 52	244,145	61.58%	152,350	38.42%	396,495	100.0%	Democratic hold
District 53	199,244	100.00%	0	0.00%	199,244	100.0%	Democratic hold
Total	11,083,766	66.27%	5,640,188	33.73%	16,723,954	100.0%	

Popular vote
Democratic	66.27%
Republican	33.73%

House seats
Democratic	79.25%
Republican	20.75%

== District 1 ==
2020 California's 1st congressional district election
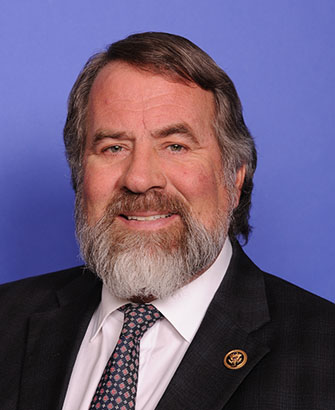

Candidate	Doug LaMalfa	Audrey Denney
Party	Republican	Democratic
Popular vote	204,190	154,073
Percentage	57.0%	43.0%
- County results LaMalfa: 50–60% 60–70% 70–80% Denney: 50–60%
U.S. Representative before election
Doug LaMalfa
Republican
Elected U.S. Representative
Doug LaMalfa
Republican

The 1st district covers the northeastern part of the state bordering Nevada and Oregon. Incumbent Republican Doug LaMalfa, who had represented the district since 2013, ran for re-election. He was re-elected with 54.9% of the vote in 2018. The district had a PVI of R+11.

=== Primary election ===
==== Advanced to general ====
- Doug LaMalfa, incumbent U.S. representative

==== Democratic candidates ====
===== Advanced to general =====
- Audrey Denney, educator, farmer and general election candidate for this seat in 2018

===== Eliminated in primary =====
- Rob Lydon, veterinarian

==== Independent candidates ====
===== Eliminated in primary =====
- Gregory Edward Cheadle, perennial candidate
- Joseph LeTourneau IV, leadership developer

==== Results ====
2020 California's 1st congressional district primary results by county Map legend: LaMalfa—50–60%; LaMalfa—60–70%; LaMalfa—80–90%; Denney—40–50%

Nonpartisan blanket primary results
Party	Candidate	Votes	%
Republican	Doug LaMalfa (incumbent)	128,613	54.6
Democratic	Audrey Denney	92,655	39.4
Democratic	Rob Lydon	8,745	3.7
No party preference	Joseph LeTourneau IV	2,769	1.2
No party preference	Gregory Edward Cheadle	2,596	1.1
Republican	Kenneth E. Swanson (write-in)	13	0.0
Total votes		235,391	100.0

=== General election ===
==== Endorsements ====
Doug LaMalfa (R)

Organizations

- National Right to Life Committee
Audrey Denney (D)

U.S. senators

- Kamala Harris, U.S. senator (CA); 2020 vice presidential nominee
- Bernie Sanders, U.S. senator (I-VT), 2016 and 2020 presidential candidate

Labor unions

- Brotherhood of Locomotive Engineers and Trainmen
- California Teachers Association
- International Association of Bridge, Structural, Ornamental and Reinforcing Iron Workers – Local 118
- International Association of Machinists and Aerospace Workers
- International Brotherhood of Electrical Workers – Local 340
- International Brotherhood of Teamsters – Joint Council 7
- International Union of Operating Engineers – Local 3
- National Education Association
- Service Employees International Union
- United Association
- United Brotherhood of Carpenters and Joiners of America

Organizations

- California Democratic Party
- California League of Conservation Voters
- College Democrats of America – California State University, Chico
- EMILY's List
- End Citizens United
- Equality California
- Indivisible movement
- People for the American Way
- Planned Parenthood
- Sierra Club
- Sunrise Movement
- Young Democrats of America – California

==== Polling ====
Poll source	Date(s) administered	Sample size (Note: Key: A – all adults RV – registered voters LV – likely voters V – unclear)	Margin of error	Doug LaMalfa (R)	Audrey Denney (D)	Undecided
Lake Research Partners (D) (Note: Poll sponsored by Denney's campaign)	October 1–4, 2020	400 (LV)	± 4.9%	49%	45%	5%
Lake Research Partners (D)	June 10–14, 2020	500 (LV)	± 4.4%	46%	41%	11%

==== Predictions ====
Source	Ranking	As of
The Cook Political Report	Safe R	November 2, 2020
Inside Elections	Safe R	October 28, 2020
Sabato's Crystal Ball	Likely R	November 2, 2020
Daily Kos	Safe R	November 2, 2020
RCP	Likely R	November 2, 2020
Decision Desk HQ	Likely R	November 3, 2020
538	Safe R	November 3, 2020
Elections Daily	Likely R	November 1, 2020
CNN	Safe R	November 1, 2020
Politico	Likely R	November 2, 2020
Niskanen	Safe R	June 7, 2020

==== Results ====
California's 1st congressional district, 2020
Party	Candidate	Votes	%
Republican	Doug LaMalfa (incumbent)	204,190	57.0
Democratic	Audrey Denney	154,073	43.0
Total votes		358,263	100.0
Republican hold			

== District 2 ==
2020 California's 2nd congressional district election
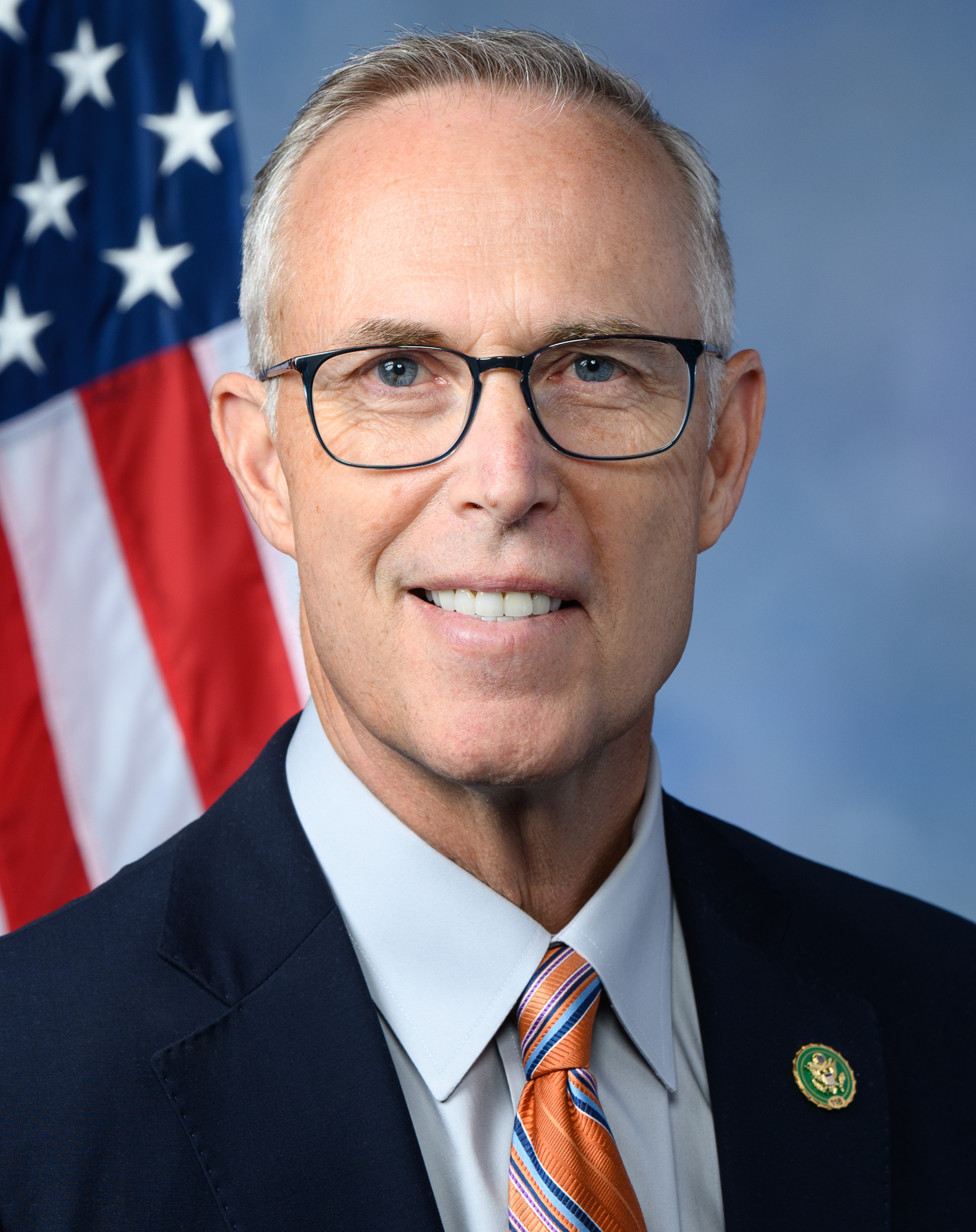

Candidate	Jared Huffman	Dale K. Mensing
Party	Democratic	Republican
Popular vote	294,435	94,320
Percentage	75.7%	24.3%
- County results Huffman: 60–70% 70–80% 80–90% Mensing: 50–60%
U.S. Representative before election
Jared Huffman
Democratic
Elected U.S. Representative
Jared Huffman
Democratic

The 2nd district encompasses the North Coast, stretching from the Golden Gate Bridge to the Oregon border, taking in San Rafael, Petaluma, Novato, Windsor, Healdsburg, Ukiah, Fort Bragg, Fortuna, Eureka, Arcata, McKinleyville, and Crescent City. Incumbent Democrat Jared Huffman, who had represented the district since 2013, ran for re-election. He was re-elected with 77.0% of the vote in 2018. The district had a PVI of D+22.

=== Primary election ===
==== Democratic candidates ====
===== Advanced to general =====
- Jared Huffman, incumbent U.S. representative

===== Eliminated in primary =====
- Rachel Moniz, operations officer

==== Republican candidates ====
===== Advanced to general =====
- Dale K. Mensing, cashier and general election candidate for this seat in 2014, 2016, and 2018

==== Green candidates ====
===== Eliminated in primary =====
- Melissa Bradley, businesswoman

==== American Independent candidates ====
===== Eliminated in primary =====
- Charles "Wally" Coppock

==== Results ====
2020 California's 2nd congressional district primary results by county Map legend: Huffman—50–60%; Huffman—60–70%; Huffman—70–80%; Mensing—40–50%

Nonpartisan blanket primary results
Party	Candidate	Votes	%
Democratic	Jared Huffman (incumbent)	184,155	67.7
Republican	Dale K. Mensing	51,287	18.9
Democratic	Rachel Moniz	20,609	7.6
Green	Melissa Bradley	12,412	4.6
American Independent	Charles "Wally" Coppock	3,600	1.3
Total votes		272,063	100.0

=== General election ===
==== Predictions ====
Source	Ranking	As of
The Cook Political Report	Safe D	November 2, 2020
Inside Elections	Safe D	October 28, 2020
Sabato's Crystal Ball	Safe D	November 2, 2020
Daily Kos	Safe D	November 2, 2020
RCP	Safe D	November 2, 2020
Decision Desk HQ	Safe D	November 3, 2020
538	Safe D	November 3, 2020
Elections Daily	Safe D	November 1, 2020
CNN	Safe D	November 1, 2020
Politico	Safe D	November 2, 2020
Niskanen	Safe D	June 7, 2020

==== Results ====
California's 2nd congressional district, 2020
Party	Candidate	Votes	%
Democratic	Jared Huffman (incumbent)	294,435	75.7
Republican	Dale K. Mensing	94,320	24.3
Total votes		388,755	100.0
Democratic hold			

== District 3 ==
2020 California's 3rd congressional district election
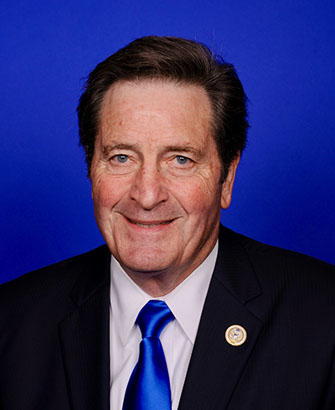

Candidate	John Garamendi	Tamika Hamilton
Party	Democratic	Republican
Popular vote	176,036	145,941
Percentage	54.7%	45.3%
- County results Garamendi: 50–60% 70–80% Hamilton: 50–60% 60–70%
U.S. Representative before election
John Garamendi
Democratic
Elected U.S. Representative
John Garamendi
Democratic

The 3rd district takes in areas north and west of Sacramento. It consists of Colusa, Sutter, and Yuba counties plus portions of Glenn, Lake, Sacramento, Solano, and Yolo counties. Incumbent Democrat John Garamendi, who had represented the 3rd district since 2013 and had previously represented the 10th district from 2009 to 2013, ran for re-election. He was re-elected with 58.1% of the vote in 2018. The district had a PVI of D+5.

=== Primary election ===
==== Democratic candidates ====
===== Advanced to general =====
- John Garamendi, incumbent U.S. representative

==== Republican candidates ====
===== Advanced to general =====
- Tamika Hamilton, U.S. Air Force veteran

===== Eliminated in primary =====
- Sean Feucht, gospel singer

==== Results ====
2020 California's 3rd congressional district primary results by county Map legend: Garamendi—40–50%; Garamendi—50–60%; Garamendi—70–80%; Hamilton—40–50%

Nonpartisan blanket primary results
Party	Candidate	Votes	%
Democratic	John Garamendi (incumbent)	110,504	59.2
Republican	Tamika Hamilton	50,925	27.3
Republican	Sean Feucht	25,243	13.5
Total votes		186,672	100.0

=== General election ===
==== Endorsements ====
John Garamendi (D)

U.S. executive branch officials

- Bill Clinton, former president of the United States (1993–2001); former governor of Arkansas (1979–1981) and (1983–1992); former attorney general of Arkansas (1977–1979)
- Barack Obama, former president of the United States (2009–2017); former U.S. senator from Illinois (2005–2008)
- Richard Rominger, former U.S. Deputy Secretary of Agriculture (1993–2001); former Secretary of Food and Agriculture of California (1977–1982)

U.S. senators

- Dianne Feinstein, U.S. senator from California (1992–present); former mayor of San Francisco (1978–1988); ranking member of the Senate Judiciary Committee (2017–present)

U.S. representatives

- Vic Fazio, former U.S. representative from CA-03 (1993–1999) and CA-04 (1979–1993)
- Jared Huffman, U.S. representative from CA-02 (2013–present)
- Doris Matsui, U.S. representative from CA-06 (2013–present) and CA-05 (2005–2013)
- George Miller, former U.S. representative from CA-11 (2013–2015) and CA-07 (1975–2013)
- Mike Thompson, U.S. representative from CA-05 (2013–present) and CA-01 (1999–2013)

State officials

- Delaine Eastin, former superintendent of Public Instruction of California (1995–2003); candidate for governor of California in 2018

State legislators

- Cecilia Aguiar-Curry, California State Assemblywoman from District 4 (2016–present)
- Roger Dickinson, former California State Assemblyman from District 7 (2012–2014) and District 9 (2010–2012)
- Jim Frazier, California State Assemblyman from District 11 (2012–present)
- Lois Wolk, former California State Senator from District 3 (2012–2016) and District 5 (2008–2012)
- Mariko Yamada, former California State Assemblywoman from District 4 (2012–2014) and District 8 (2008–2012)

Labor unions

- Air Line Pilots Association, International
- Amalgamated Transit Union
- American Federation of Government Employees
- American Federation of State, County and Municipal Employees
- American Federation of Teachers
- American Maritime Officers
- American Postal Workers Union
- California Teachers Association
- Communications Workers of America
- International Association of Fire Fighters
- International Association of Machinists and Aerospace Workers
- International Brotherhood of Boilermakers, Iron Ship Builders, Blacksmiths, Forgers and Helpers
- International Brotherhood of Electrical Workers
- International Brotherhood of Teamsters
- International Longshore and Warehouse Union
- International Union of Painters and Allied Trades
- Laborers' International Union of North America
- Marine Engineers' Beneficial Association
- National Air Traffic Controllers Association
- National Association of Letter Carriers
- National Education Association
- National Nurses United
- National Rural Letter Carriers' Association
- National Union of Healthcare Workers
- Office and Professional Employees International Union
- Seafarers International Union of North America
- Service Employees International Union
- Transport Workers Union of America
- United Association
- United Auto Workers
- United Brotherhood of Carpenters and Joiners of America
- United Food and Commercial Workers
- United Steelworkers
- United Transportation Union

Organizations

- California Democratic Party
- Human Rights Campaign
- J Street
- League of Conservation Voters
- National Organization for Women
- Ocean Champions
- Sierra Club
- Young Democrats of America – California

Newspapers

- Daily Democrat
- Daily Republic
- The Reporter
- The Sacramento Bee
Tamika Hamilton (R)

Organizations

- Maggie's List

==== Predictions ====
Source	Ranking	As of
The Cook Political Report	Safe D	November 2, 2020
Inside Elections	Safe D	October 28, 2020
Sabato's Crystal Ball	Safe D	November 2, 2020
Daily Kos	Safe D	November 2, 2020
RCP	Safe D	November 2, 2020
Decision Desk HQ	Safe D	November 3, 2020
538	Safe D	November 3, 2020
Elections Daily	Safe D	November 1, 2020
CNN	Safe D	November 1, 2020
Politico	Safe D	November 2, 2020
Niskanen	Safe D	June 7, 2020

==== Results ====
California's 3rd congressional district, 2020
Party	Candidate	Votes	%
Democratic	John Garamendi (incumbent)	176,043	54.7
Republican	Tamika Hamilton	145,945	45.3
Total votes		321,988	100.0
Democratic hold			

== District 4 ==
2020 California's 4th congressional district election
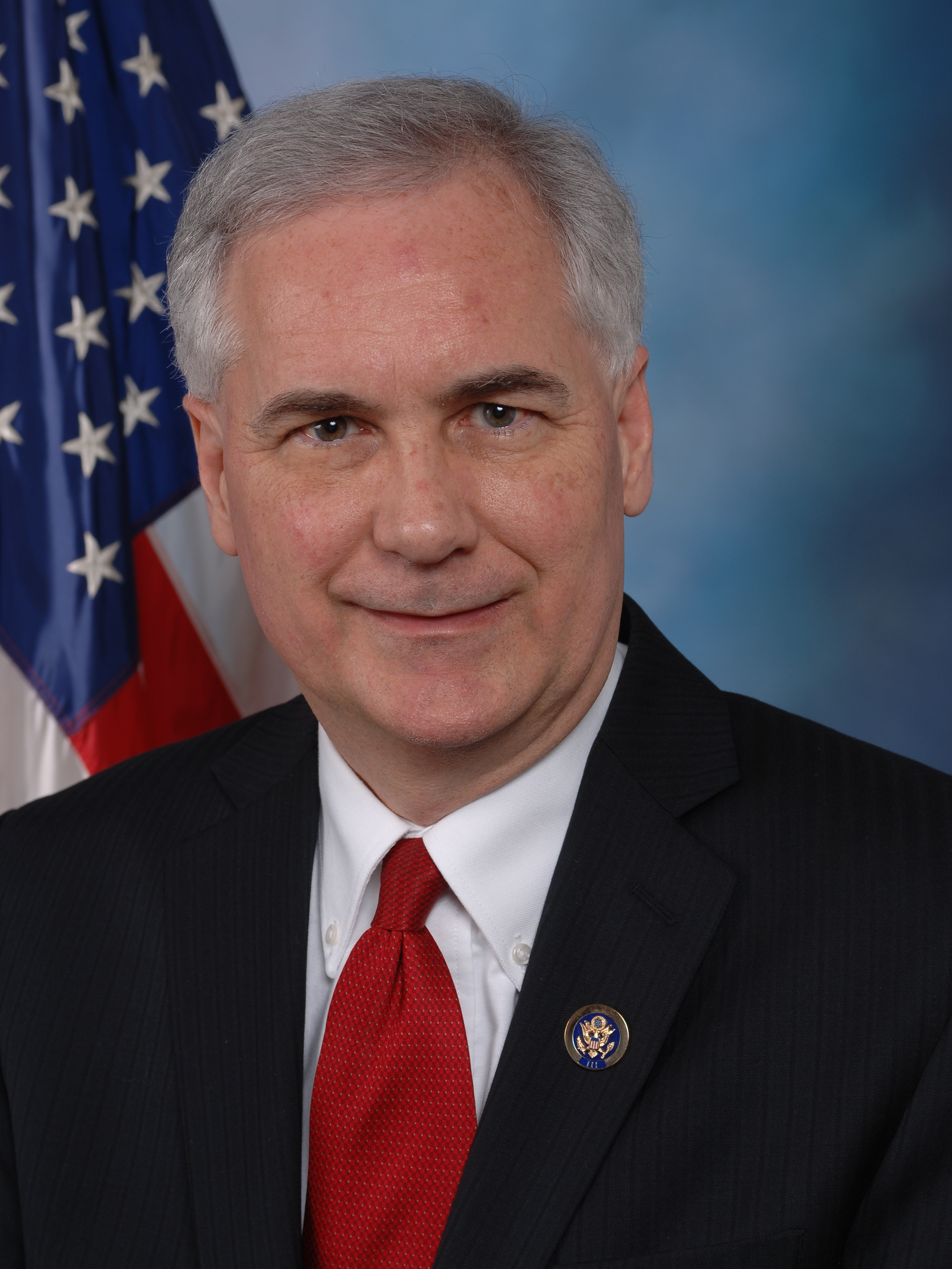

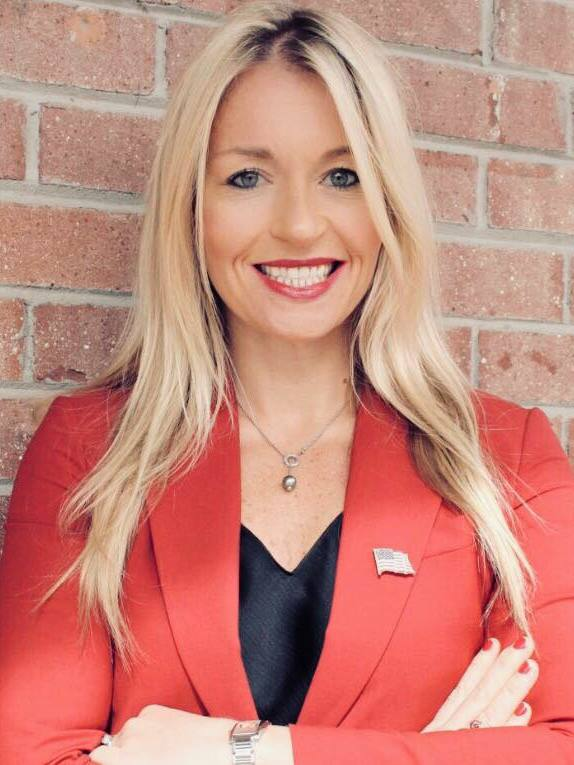
Candidate	Tom McClintock	Brynne S. Kennedy
Party	Republican	Democratic
Popular vote	247,291	194,731
Percentage	55.9%	44.1%
- County results McClintock: 50–60% 60–70% 70–80% Kennedy: 60–70% 70–80%
U.S. Representative before election
Tom McClintock
Republican
Elected U.S. Representative
Tom McClintock
Republican

The 4th district encompasses the suburbs of Sacramento and the Sierra Nevada. Incumbent Republican Tom McClintock, who had represented the district since 2009, ran for re-election. He was re-elected with 54.1% of the vote in 2018. The district had a PVI of R+10.

=== Primary election ===
==== Republican candidates ====
===== Advanced to general =====
- Tom McClintock, incumbent U.S. representative

===== Eliminated in primary =====
- Julianne Benzel, history teacher
- Jamie Byers, state parole agent
- Jacob Thomas, businessman

==== Democratic candidates ====
===== Advanced to general =====
- Brynne S. Kennedy, businesswoman

==== Withdrawn ====
- Sean Frame, Placerville Union school board member

==== Independent candidates ====
===== Eliminated in primary =====
- Robert Lawton, businessman and Democratic candidate for this seat in 2018

==== Declined ====
- Jessica Morse, deputy secretary of forest resources management at the California Natural Resources Agency and general election candidate for this seat in 2018

==== Results ====
2020 California's 4th congressional district primary results by county Map legend: McClintock—40–50%; McClintock—50–60%; McClintock—60–70%; Kennedy—60–70%; Kennedy—70–80%

Nonpartisan blanket primary results
Party	Candidate	Votes	%
Republican	Tom McClintock (incumbent)	141,244	50.7
Democratic	Brynne S. Kennedy	110,771	39.8
Republican	Julianne Benzel	12,138	4.4
No party preference	Robert Lawton	4,848	1.7
Republican	Jamie Byers	4,822	1.7
Republican	Jacob Thomas	4,527	1.6
Total votes		278,350	100.0

=== General election ===
==== Endorsements ====
Tom McClintock (R)

Organizations

- Fresno County Republican Party
Brynne Kennedy (D)

U.S. senators

- Kamala Harris, U.S. senator (D-CA); 2020 vice presidential nominee

State officials

- Eleni Kounalakis, lieutenant governor of California

Labor unions

- AFL-CIO
- American Federation of State, County and Municipal Employees
- California Federation of Teachers
- California School Employees Association
- California Teachers Association

Organizations

- Blue Dog Coalition
- California League of Conservation Voters
- EMILY's List
- Humanity Forward
- Indivisible
- Sierra Club

Individuals

- Meg Whitman, 2010 Republican nominee for governor

==== Polling ====
Poll source	Date(s) administered	Sample size	Margin of error	Tom McClintock (R)	Brynne Kennedy (D)	Undecided
Lake Research Partners (D) (Note: Poll sponsored by Kennedy's campaign)	October 12–14, 2020	958 (LV)	± 4.14%	49%	45%	6%
Lake Research Partners (D)	July 22–25, 2020	650 (LV)	–	45%	42%	13%
Lake Research Partners (D)	April 26 – May 4, 2020	2,196 (LV)	–	46%	40%	14%

Hypothetical polling

with Generic Opponent

Poll source	Date(s) administered	Sample size	Margin of error	Tom McClintock (R)	Generic Opponent	Undecided
Lake Research Partners (D)	April 26 – May 4, 2020	2,196 (LV)	–	36%	36% (Note: "Definitely vote for someone else" with 36% as opposed to definitely voting to reelect McClintock)	28%

==== Predictions ====
Source	Ranking	As of
The Cook Political Report	Safe R	November 2, 2020
Inside Elections	Safe R	October 28, 2020
Sabato's Crystal Ball	Likely R	November 2, 2020
Daily Kos	Safe R	November 2, 2020
RCP	Likely R	November 2, 2020
Decision Desk HQ	Likely R	November 3, 2020
538	Safe R	November 3, 2020
Elections Daily	Likely R	November 1, 2020
CNN	Safe R	November 1, 2020
Politico	Likely R	November 2, 2020
Niskanen	Safe R	June 7, 2020

==== Results ====
California's 4th congressional district, 2020
Party	Candidate	Votes	%
Republican	Tom McClintock (incumbent)	247,291	55.9
Democratic	Brynne S. Kennedy	194,731	44.1
Total votes		442,022	100.0
Republican hold			

== District 5 ==
2020 California's 5th congressional district election
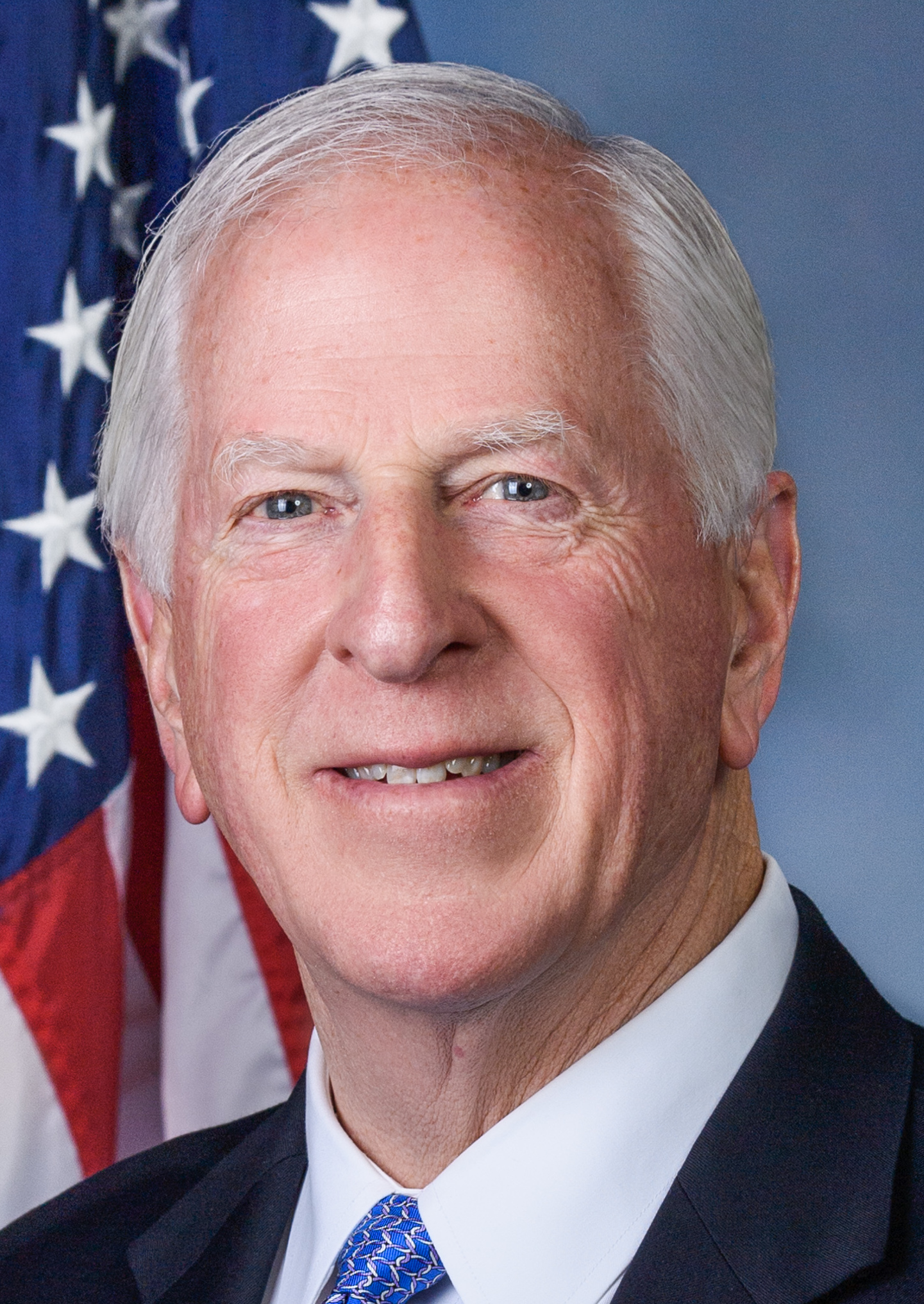

Candidate	Mike Thompson	Scott Giblin
Party	Democratic	Republican
Popular vote	271,233	85,277
Percentage	76.1%	23.9%
- County results Thompson: 50–60% 70–80%
U.S. Representative before election
Mike Thompson
Democratic
Elected U.S. Representative
Mike Thompson
Democratic

The 5th district encompasses much of California's wine country. It includes Cotati, Rohnert Park, Santa Rosa, Sonoma, Napa, American Canyon, Vallejo, Benicia, Hercules, and part of Martinez. Incumbent Democrat Mike Thompson, who had represented the district since 1999, ran for re-election. He was re-elected with 78.9% of the vote in 2018. The district had a PVI of D+21.

=== Primary election ===
==== Democratic candidates ====
===== Advanced to general =====
- Mike Thompson, incumbent U.S. representative

===== Eliminated in primary =====
- Jason Kishineff, activist
- Josh Wesley Tyler, teacher

==== Republican candidates ====
===== Advanced to general =====
- Scott Giblin, information services technician

==== Results ====
2020 California's 5th congressional district primary results by county Map legend: Thompson—50–60%; Thompson—60–70%

Nonpartisan blanket primary results
Party	Candidate	Votes	%
Democratic	Mike Thompson (incumbent)	146,980	67.5
Republican	Scott Giblin	43,987	20.2
Democratic	John Wesley Tyler	20,725	9.5
Democratic	Jason Kishineff	5,928	2.7
Total votes		217,620	100.0

=== General election ===
==== Endorsements ====
Mike Thompson (D)

Labor unions

- California Teachers Association

Organizations

- Brady Campaign
- California League of Conservation Voters
- Human Rights Campaign
- J Street PAC
- Planned Parenthood Action Fund
- Sierra Club

==== Predictions ====
Source	Ranking	As of
The Cook Political Report	Safe D	November 2, 2020
Inside Elections	Safe D	October 28, 2020
Sabato's Crystal Ball	Safe D	November 2, 2020
Daily Kos	Safe D	November 2, 2020
RCP	Safe D	November 2, 2020
Decision Desk HQ	Safe D	November 3, 2020
538	Safe D	November 3, 2020
Elections Daily	Safe D	November 1, 2020
CNN	Safe D	November 1, 2020
Politico	Safe D	November 2, 2020
Niskanen	Safe D	June 7, 2020

==== Results ====
California's 5th congressional district, 2020
Party	Candidate	Votes	%
Democratic	Mike Thompson (incumbent)	271,233	76.1
Republican	Scott Giblin	85,227	23.9
Total votes		356,460	100.0
Democratic hold			

== District 6 ==
2020 California's 6th congressional district election
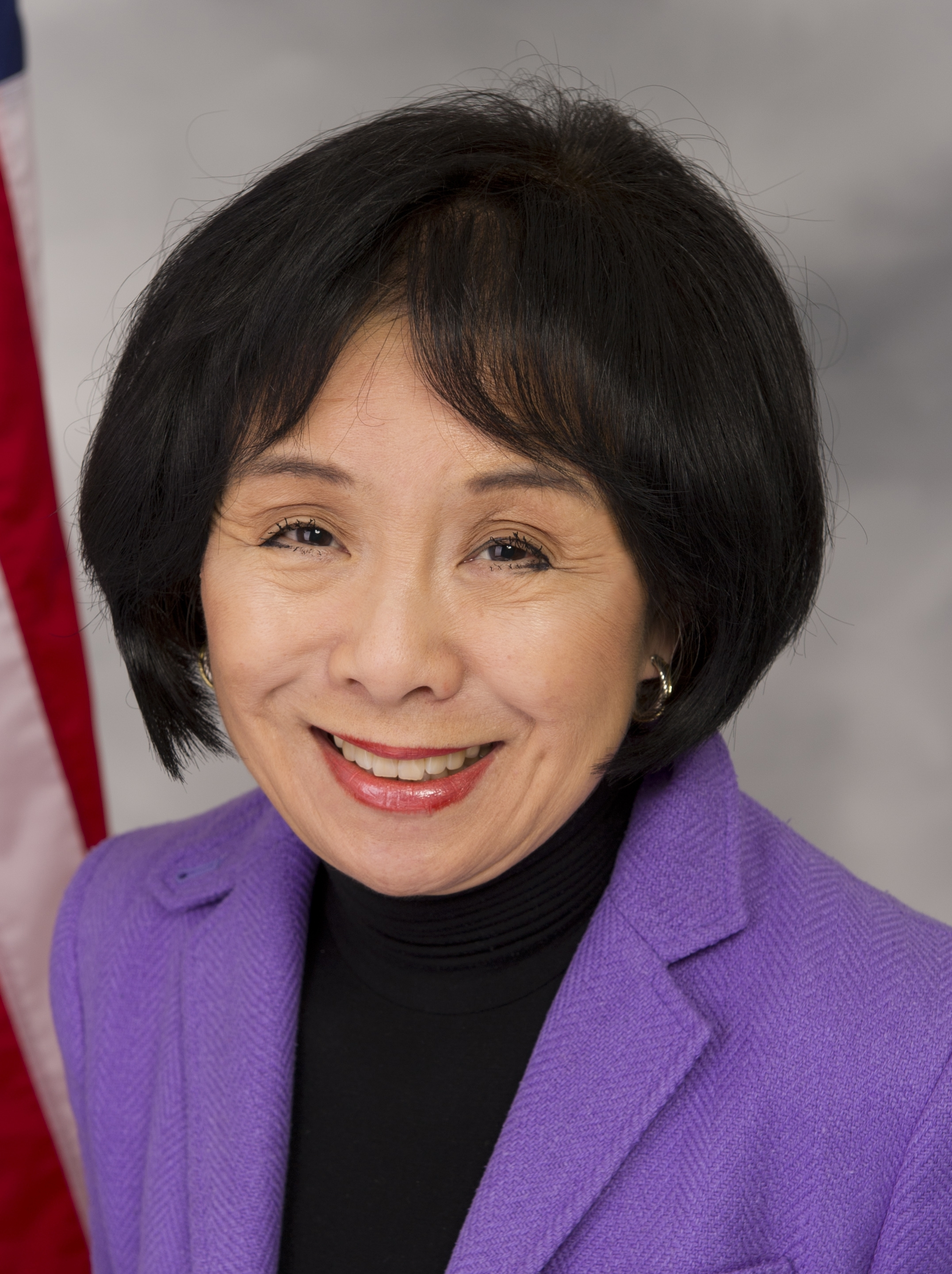

Candidate	Doris Matsui	Chris Bish
Party	Democratic	Republican
Popular vote	229,648	83,466
Percentage	73.3	26.7
- County results Matsui: 60–70% 70–80%
U.S. Representative before election
Doris Matsui
Democratic
Elected U.S. Representative
Doris Matsui
Democratic

The 6th district takes in Sacramento and its surrounding suburbs, including West Sacramento and North Highlands. Incumbent Democrat Doris Matsui, who had represented the district since 2005, ran for re-election. He was re-elected with 80.4% of the vote in 2018. The district had a PVI of D+21.

=== Primary election ===
==== Democratic candidates ====
===== Advanced to general =====
- Doris Matsui, incumbent U.S. representative

===== Eliminated in primary =====
- Benjamin Emard, attorney

==== Republican candidates ====
===== Advanced to general =====
- Chris Bish, realtor

===== Eliminated in primary =====
- Sherwood Ellsworth Haisty Jr., minister

==== Results ====
2020 California's 6th congressional district primary results by county Map legend: Matsui—60–70%; Matsui—70–80%

Nonpartisan blanket primary results
Party	Candidate	Votes	%
Democratic	Doris Matsui (incumbent)	119,408	70.2
Republican	Chris Bish	24,321	14.3
Democratic	Benjamin Emard	13,253	7.8
Republican	Sherwood Ellsworth Haisty Jr.	13,137	7.7
Total votes		170,119	100.0

=== General election ===
==== Endorsements ====
Doris Matsui (D)

Labor unions

- California Teachers Association
- National Union of Healthcare Workers

Organizations

- California League of Conservation Voters
- Human Rights Campaign
- Planned Parenthood Action Fund
- Sierra Club

==== Predictions ====
Source	Ranking	As of
The Cook Political Report	Safe D	November 2, 2020
Inside Elections	Safe D	October 28, 2020
Sabato's Crystal Ball	Safe D	November 2, 2020
Daily Kos	Safe D	November 2, 2020
RCP	Safe D	November 2, 2020
Decision Desk HQ	Safe D	November 3, 2020
538	Safe D	November 3, 2020
Elections Daily	Safe D	November 1, 2020
CNN	Safe D	November 1, 2020
Politico	Safe D	November 2, 2020
Niskanen	Safe D	June 7, 2020

==== Results ====
California's 6th congressional district, 2020
Party	Candidate	Votes	%
Democratic	Doris Matsui (incumbent)	229,648	73.3
Republican	Chris Bish	83,466	26.7
Total votes		313,114	100.0
Democratic hold			

== District 7 ==
2020 California's 7th congressional district election
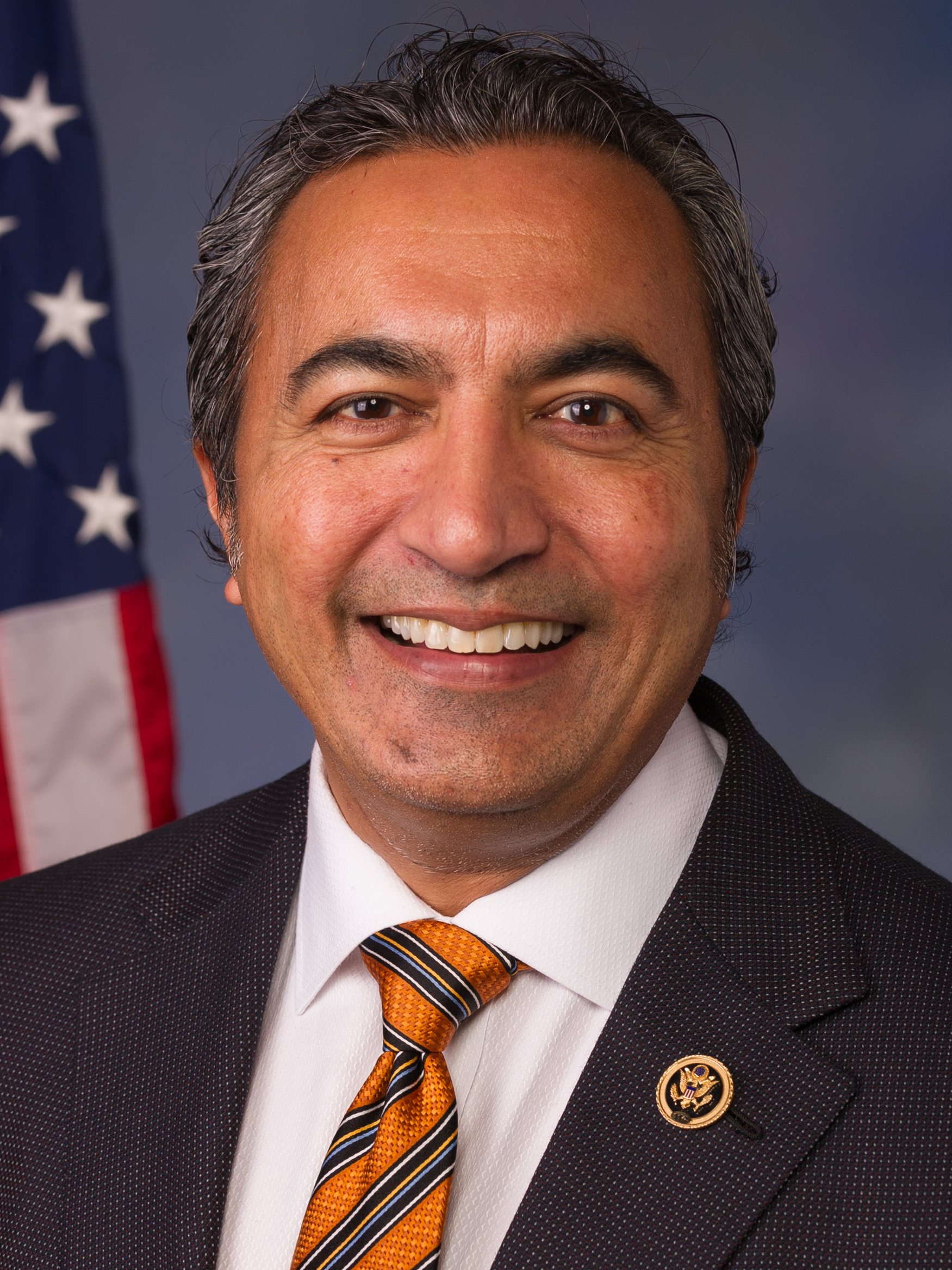

Candidate	Ami Bera	Buzz Patterson
Party	Democratic	Republican
Popular vote	217,416	166,549
Percentage	56.6%	43.4%
- County results Bera: 50–60%
U.S. Representative before election
Ami Bera
Democratic
Elected U.S. Representative
Ami Bera
Democratic

The 7th district is located in southern and eastern Sacramento County, including the cities of Elk Grove, Folsom, and Rancho Cordova. Incumbent Democrat Ami Bera, who had represented the district since 213, ran for re-election. He was re-elected with 55.0% of the vote in 2018. The district had a PVI of D+3.

=== Candidates ===
==== Advanced to general ====
- Ami Bera (Democratic), incumbent U.S. representative
- Buzz Patterson (Republican), retired United States Air Force lieutenant colonel

==== Eliminated in primary ====
- Jeff Burdick (Democratic), public affairs specialist
- Jon Ivy (Republican), voting rights activist
- Chris Richardson (Green), engineer

==== Results ====
Nonpartisan blanket primary results
Party	Candidate	Votes	%
Democratic	Ami Bera (incumbent)	106,124	50.3
Republican	Buzz Patterson	70,803	33.6
Democratic	Jeff Burdick	15,114	7.2
Republican	Jon Ivy	14,017	6.6
Green	Chris Richardson	4,837	2.3
Total votes		210,895	100.0

=== General election ===
==== Endorsements ====
Ami Bera (D)

Labor unions

- California Teachers Association

Organizations

- 314 Action
- California League of Conservation Voters
- End Citizens United
- Human Rights Campaign
- J Street PAC
- NARAL Pro-Choice America
- Planned Parenthood Action Fund
- Population Connection
- Sierra Club
Buzz Patterson (R)

Organizations

- National Right to Life Committee

==== Predictions ====
Source	Ranking	As of
The Cook Political Report	Safe D	November 2, 2020
Inside Elections	Safe D	October 28, 2020
Sabato's Crystal Ball	Safe D	November 2, 2020
Daily Kos	Safe D	November 2, 2020
RCP	Likely D	November 2, 2020
Decision Desk HQ	Safe D	November 3, 2020
538	Safe D	November 3, 2020
Elections Daily	Safe D	November 1, 2020
CNN	Safe D	November 1, 2020
Politico	Likely D	November 2, 2020
Niskanen	Safe D	June 7, 2020

==== Results ====
California's 7th congressional district, 2020
Party	Candidate	Votes	%
Democratic	Ami Bera (incumbent)	217,416	56.6
Republican	Buzz Patterson	166,549	43.4
Total votes		383,965	100.0
Democratic hold			

== District 8 ==
2020 California's 8th congressional district election
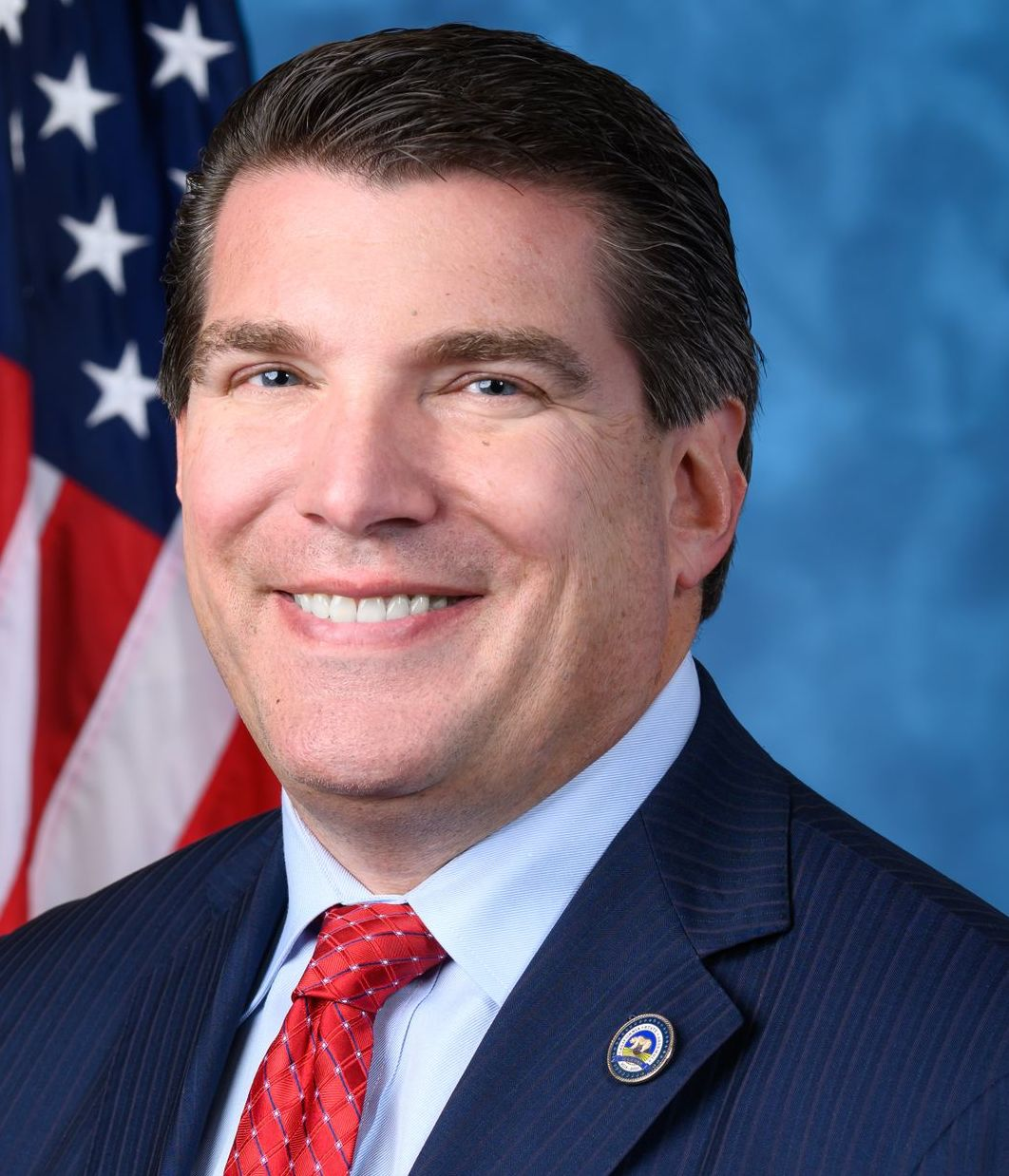

Candidate	Jay Obernolte	Christine Bubser
Party	Republican	Democratic
Popular vote	158,711	124,400
Percentage	56.1%	43.9%
- County results Obernolte: 50–60% Bubser: 60–70%
U.S. Representative before election
Paul Cook
Republican
Elected U.S. Representative
Jay Obernolte
Republican

The 8th district includes most of the eastern desert regions of the state. It stretches from Mono Lake to Twentynine Palms and consists of Inyo and Mono counties plus most of San Bernardino County. Incumbent Republican Paul Cook, who had represented the district since 2013, announced on September 17, 2019, that he would not seek re-election, instead planning to run for an open seat on the San Bernardino County Board of Supervisors. He was re-elected with 60.0%% of the vote in 2018. The district had a PVI of R+9.

=== Primary election ===
==== Republican candidates ====
===== Advanced to general =====
- Jay Obernolte, state assembly member

===== Eliminated in primary =====
- Tim Donnelly, former state assembly member, candidate for governor in 2014, for this seat in 2016 and general election candidate in 2018
- Jerry Laws, candidate for U.S. Senate in 2016 and 2018
- Jeremy Staat, U.S. Marine veteran and former NFL player
- Justin David Whitehead, realtor

===== Declined =====
- Paul Cook, incumbent U.S. representative

==== Democratic candidates ====
===== Advanced to general =====
- Christine Bubser, engineer and biotechnology advisor

===== Eliminated in primary =====
- Bob Conaway, attorney and general election candidate for this seat in 2014
- James Ellars, energy consultant

==== Independent candidates ====
===== Eliminated in primary =====
- Jeff Esmus, teacher

===== Declined =====
- Chad Mayes, state assembly member and former minority leader of the California Assembly

==== Endorsements ====
Jeremy Staat (R)

Organizations

- War Veterans Fund

==== Results ====
2020 California's 8th congressional district primary results by county Map legend: Obernolte—30–40%; Bubser—30–40%; Bubser—40–50%

Nonpartisan blanket primary results
Party	Candidate	Votes	%
Republican	Jay Obernolte	50,677	35.0
Democratic	Christine Bubser	41,595	28.7
Republican	Tim Donnelly	30,079	20.7
Democratic	Bob Conaway	9,053	6.2
No party preference	Jeff Esmus	4,042	2.8
Democratic	James Ellars	3,948	2.7
Republican	Jeremy Staat	2,288	1.6
Republican	Jerry Laws	2,010	1.4
Republican	Justin David Whitehead	1,305	0.9
No party preference	J. Green (write-in)	11	0.0
Total votes		145,008	100.0

=== General election ===
==== Endorsements ====
Christine Bubser (D)

U.S. senators

- Kamala Harris, U.S. senator (D-CA); 2020 vice presidential nominee

U.S. representatives

- Julia Brownley, U.S. representative (CA-26)
- Judy Chu, U.S. representative (CA-27)
- Gil Cisneros, U.S. representative (CA-39)
- Mike Levin, U.S. representative (CA-49)
- Ted Lieu, U.S. representative (CA-33)
- Katie Porter, U.S. representative (CA-45)
- Raul Ruiz, U.S. representative (CA-36)
- Linda T. Sánchez, U.S. representative (CA-38)

State legislators

- Connie Leyva, state senator (SD-20)

Labor unions

- California Labor Federation

Organizations

- California League of Conservation Voters
- Demand Universal Healthcare
- EMILY's List
- End Citizens United
- Equality California
- Sierra Club

==== Polling ====
Poll source	Date(s) administered	Sample size	Margin of error	Jay Obernolte (R)	Christine Bubser (D)	Undecided
Global Strategy Group (D) (Note: Poll conducted for Christine Bubser.)	August 1–5, 2020	400 (LV)	± 4.9%	48%	38%	13%

==== Predictions ====
Source	Ranking	As of
The Cook Political Report	Safe R	November 2, 2020
Inside Elections	Safe R	October 28, 2020
Sabato's Crystal Ball	Safe R	November 2, 2020
Daily Kos	Safe R	November 2, 2020
RCP	Likely R	November 2, 2020
Decision Desk HQ	Likely R	November 3, 2020
538	Safe R	November 3, 2020
Elections Daily	Safe R	November 1, 2020
CNN	Safe R	November 1, 2020
Politico	Safe R	November 2, 2020
Niskanen	Safe R	June 7, 2020

==== Results ====
California's 8th congressional district, 2020
Party	Candidate	Votes	%
Republican	Jay Obernolte	158,711	56.1
Democratic	Christine Bubser	124,400	43.9
Total votes		283,111	100.0
Republican hold			

== District 9 ==
2020 California's 9th congressional district election

Candidate	Jerry McNerney	Tony Amador
Party	Democratic	Republican
Popular vote	174,252	128,358
Percentage	57.6%	42.4%
- County results
U.S. Representative before election
Jerry McNerney
Democratic
Elected U.S. Representative
Jerry McNerney
Democratic

The 9th district is centered around the San Joaquin Delta, taking in Stockton, Antioch, Galt, Oakley, Lathrop, and Lodi. Incumbent Democrat Jerry McNerney, who had represented the district since, ran for re-election. He was re-elected with 56.5% of the vote in 2018. The district had a PVI of D+8.

=== Primary election ===
==== Democratic candidates ====
===== Advanced to general =====
- Jerry McNerney, incumbent U.S. representative

==== Republican candidates ====
===== Advanced to general =====
- Antonio C. "Tony" Amador, retired U.S. marshal and general election candidate for this seat in 2014 and 2016

===== Eliminated in primary =====
- William Martinek, financial advisor

==== Results ====
2020 California's 9th congressional district primary results by county Map legend: McNerney—60–70%; McNerney—50–60%; Amador—40–50%

Nonpartisan blanket primary results
Party	Candidate	Votes	%
Democratic	Jerry McNerney (incumbent)	86,556	57.0
Republican	Antonio C. "Tony" Amador	45,962	30.3
Republican	William Martinek	19,255	12.7
Democratic	Crystal Sawyer White (write-in)	22	0.0
Total votes		151,795	100.0

=== General election ===
==== Predictions ====
Source	Ranking	As of
The Cook Political Report	Safe D	November 2, 2020
Inside Elections	Safe D	October 28, 2020
Sabato's Crystal Ball	Safe D	November 2, 2020
Daily Kos	Safe D	November 2, 2020
RCP	Safe D	November 2, 2020
Decision Desk HQ	Safe D	November 3, 2020
538	Safe D	November 3, 2020
Elections Daily	Safe D	November 1, 2020
CNN	Safe D	November 1, 2020
Politico	Likely D	November 2, 2020
Niskanen	Safe D	June 7, 2020

==== Results ====
California's 9th congressional district, 2020
Party	Candidate	Votes	%
Democratic	Jerry McNerney (incumbent)	174,252	57.6
Republican	Antonio C. "Tony" Amador	128,358	42.4
Total votes		302,610	100.0
Democratic hold			

== District 10 ==
2020 California's 10th congressional district election
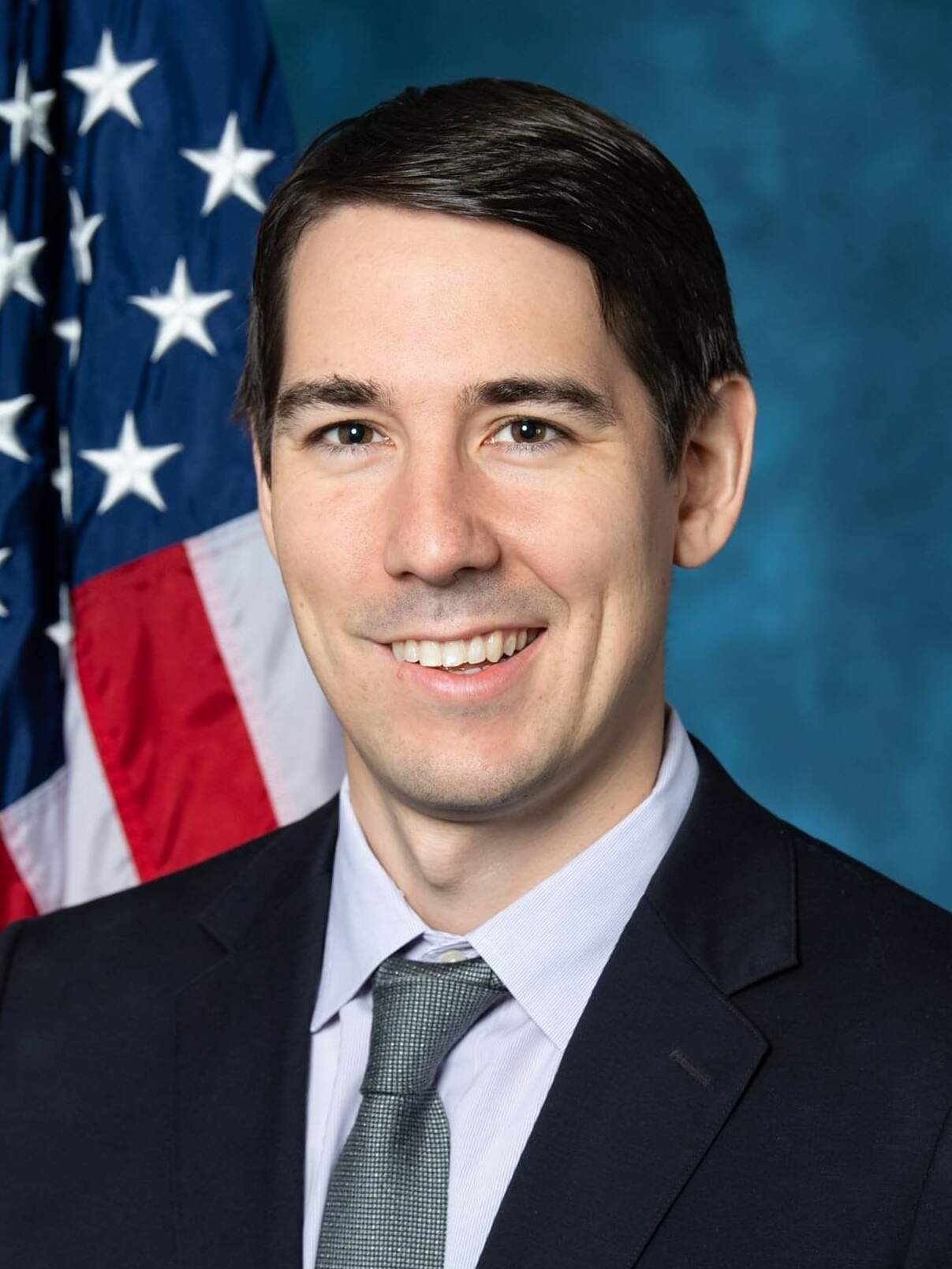

Candidate	Josh Harder	Ted Howze
Party	Democratic	Republican
Popular vote	161,745	131,447
Percentage	55.2%	44.8%
- County results Harder: 50–60%
U.S. Representative before election
Josh Harder
Democratic
Elected U.S. Representative
Josh Harder
Democratic

The 10th district covers San Joaquin Valley, including the cities of Oakdale, Manteca, Modesto, Tracy, and Turlock. Incumbent Democrat Josh Harder, who had represented the district since 2018, ran for re-election. He was elected with 52.3% of the vote in 2018. The district had a PVI of EVEN.

=== Primary election ===
==== Democratic candidates ====
===== Advanced to general =====
- Josh Harder, incumbent U.S. representative

===== Eliminated in primary =====
- Michael J. "Mike" Barkley, accountant and perennial candidate
- Ryan Blevins, robotics engineer

==== Republican candidates ====
===== Advanced to general =====
- Ted Howze, veterinarian, former Turlock city council member and candidate for this seat in 2018

===== Eliminated in primary =====
- Bob Elliott, San Joaquin County supervisor
- Marla Sousa Livengood, businesswoman and general election candidate for the 9th district in 2018

===== Withdrawn =====
- Charles Dossett, U.S. Army veteran

===== Declined =====
- Jeff Denham, former U.S. representative

==== Endorsements ====
Bob Elliott (R)

Organizations

- Combat Veterans for Congress

==== Results ====
2020 California's 10th congressional district primary results by county Map legend: Harder—40–50%

Nonpartisan blanket primary results
Party	Candidate	Votes	%
Democratic	Josh Harder (incumbent)	69,668	44.1
Republican	Ted Howze	53,574	33.9
Republican	Bob Elliott	20,481	13.0
Democratic	Michael J. "Mike" Barkley	5,561	3.5
Republican	Marla Sousa Livengood	5,270	3.3
Democratic	Ryan Blevins	3,536	2.2
Total votes		158,090	100.0

=== General election ===
==== Endorsements ====
Josh Harder (D)

U.S. executive branch officials

- Barack Obama, former president of the United States (2009–2017, former senator from Illinois (2005–2008)

U.S. senators

- Kamala Harris, U.S. senator (D-CA); 2020 vice presidential nominee

Labor unions

- Service Employees International Union

Organizations

- Council for a Livable World
- End Citizens United
- Human Rights Campaign
- League of Conservation Voters Action Fund
- Planned Parenthood Action Fund
- Sierra Club

==== Predictions ====
Source	Ranking	As of
The Cook Political Report	Likely D	November 2, 2020
Inside Elections	Safe D	October 28, 2020
Sabato's Crystal Ball	Safe D	November 2, 2020
Daily Kos	Safe D	November 2, 2020
RCP	Lean D	November 2, 2020
Decision Desk HQ	Likely D	November 3, 2020
538	Likely D	November 3, 2020
Elections Daily	Safe D	November 1, 2020
CNN	Safe D	November 1, 2020
Politico	Likely D	November 2, 2020
Niskanen	Safe D	June 7, 2020

==== Results ====
California's 10th congressional district, 2020
Party	Candidate	Votes	%
Democratic	Josh Harder (incumbent)	166,865	55.2
Republican	Ted Howze	135,629	44.8
Total votes		302,494	100.0
Democratic hold			

== District 11 ==
2020 California's 11th congressional district election
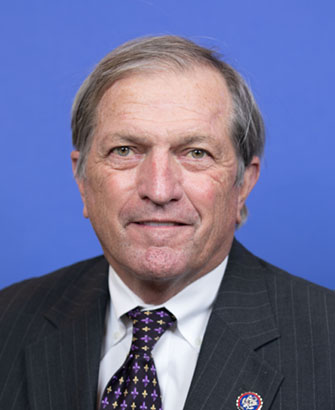

Candidate	Mark DeSaulnier	Nisha Sharma
Party	Democratic	Republican
Popular vote	271,063	100,293
Percentage	73.0%	27.0%
- County results Desaulnier: 70–80%
U.S. Representative before election
Mark DeSaulnier
Democratic
Elected U.S. Representative
Mark DeSaulnier
Democratic

The 11th district encompasses parts of the East Bay, including Alamo, Antioch, Bay Point, Blackhawk, Clayton, Concord, Danville, Diablo, El Cerrito, El Sobrante, Kensington, Lafayette, Moraga, Orinda, Pittsburg, Pleasant Hill, San Pablo, Richmond and Walnut Creek. The incumbent was Democrat Mark DeSaulnier, who was re-elected with 74.1% of the vote in 2018.

=== Candidates ===
==== Advanced to general ====
- Mark DeSaulnier (Democratic), incumbent U.S. representative
- Nisha Sharma (Republican), realtor

==== Eliminated in primary ====
- Michael Ernest Kerr (Green), social justice advocate

=== Predictions ===
Source	Ranking	As of
The Cook Political Report	Safe D	July 2, 2020
Inside Elections	Safe D	June 2, 2020
Sabato's Crystal Ball	Safe D	July 2, 2020
Politico	Safe D	April 19, 2020
Daily Kos	Safe D	June 3, 2020
RCP	Safe D	June 9, 2020
Niskanen	Safe D	June 7, 2020

=== Results ===
California's 11th congressional district, 2020
Primary election
Party	Candidate	Votes	%
Democratic	Mark DeSaulnier (incumbent)	151,544	71.2
Republican	Nisha Sharma	45,606	21.4
Green	Michael Ernest Kerr	15,697	7.4
Total votes		212,847	100.0
General election
Democratic	Mark DeSaulnier (incumbent)	271,063	73.0
Republican	Nisha Sharma	100,293	27.0
Total votes		371,356	100.0
Democratic hold			

== District 12 ==
2020 California's 12th congressional district election
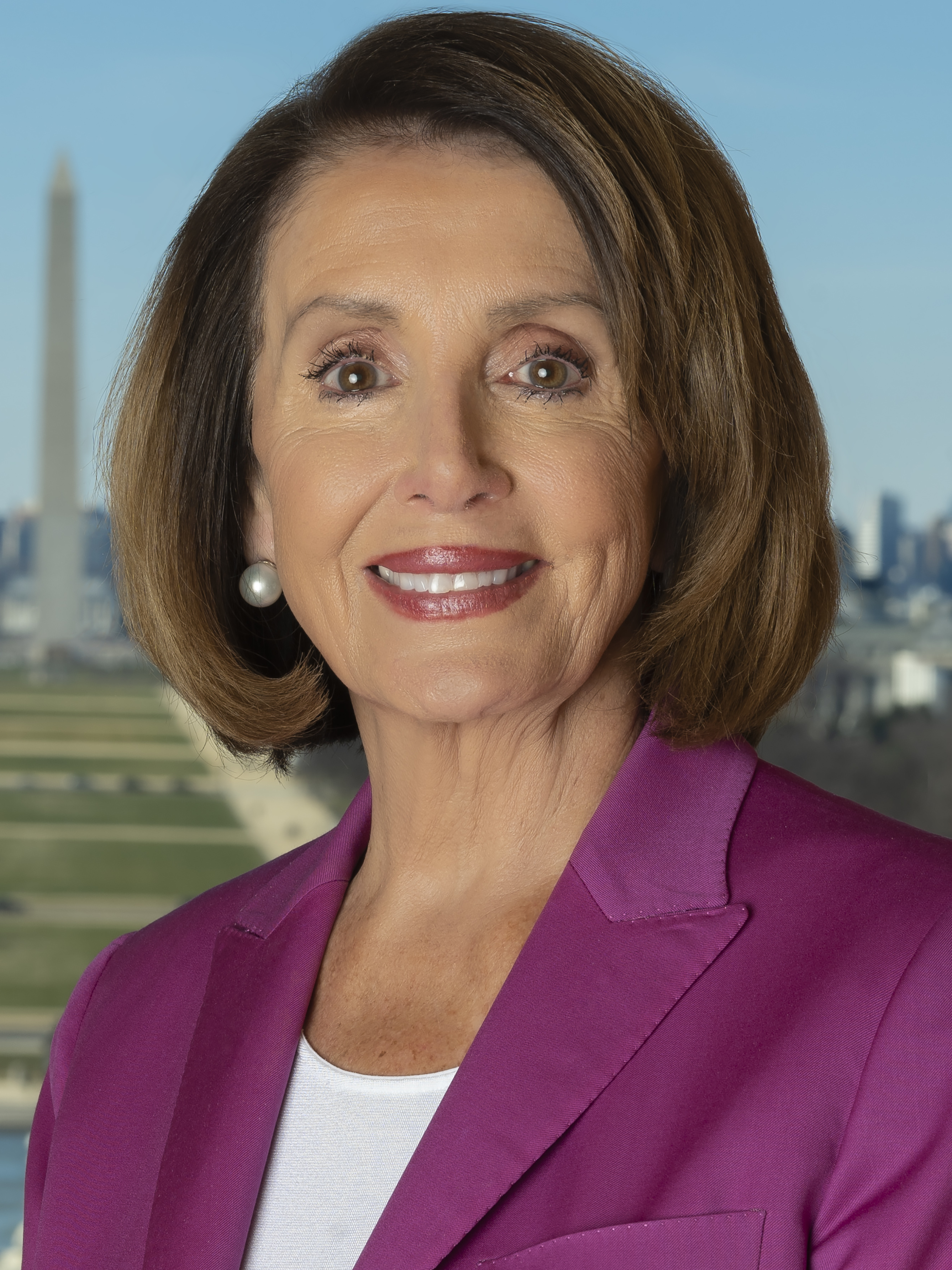

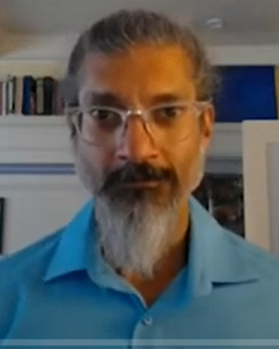
Candidate	Nancy Pelosi	Shahid Buttar
Party	Democratic	Democratic
Popular vote	281,776	81,174
Percentage	77.6%	22.4%
U.S. Representative before election
Nancy Pelosi
Democratic
Elected U.S. Representative
Nancy Pelosi
Democratic

The 12th district is based entirely within San Francisco. The incumbent was Speaker of the House Nancy Pelosi (Democratic).

=== Candidates ===
==== Advanced to general ====
- Shahid Buttar (Democratic), attorney and democratic socialist activist
- Nancy Pelosi (Democratic), incumbent U.S. representative

==== Eliminated in primary ====
- Agatha Bacelar (Democratic), documentary filmmaker and engineer
- John Dennis (Republican), businessman and perennial candidate
- Deanna Lorraine (Republican), political commentator

==== Withdrawn ====
- Tom Gallagher (Democratic), former Massachusetts state representative (1980–1986)

=== Endorsements ===
Shahid Buttar (D)

Local officials

- Matt Gonzalez, former president of the San Francisco Board of Supervisors
- Eric Mar, former member of the San Francisco Board of Supervisors from District 1
- ~~Dean Preston, member of the San Francisco Board of Supervisors from District 5~~ (withdrawn)
- Jason West, former mayor of New Paltz, New York

Individuals

- Medea Benjamin
- Mike Gravel, Alaska politician and former Democratic presidential primary candidate
- Ana Kasparian, political commentator
- Shaun King, activist
- Lawrence Lessig
- Susan Sarandon, actress and activist
- Linda Sarsour
- Richard Stallman
- Cornel West
- Marianne Williamson, author and 2020 Democratic Party presidential primaries candidate

Unions

- San Francisco Tenants Union

Organizations

- ~~Democratic Socialists of America – San Francisco chapter~~ (withdrawn)
- ~~Democratic Socialists of America – Silicon Valley chapter~~ (withdrawn)
- Our Revolution – Contra Costa chapter
- Our Revolution – East Bay chapter
- San Francisco League of Young Voters
- Veterans for Bernie Sanders

Publications

- Current Affairs
Nancy Pelosi (D)

Unions

- California Teachers Association
- Service Employees International Union California

Organizations

- End Citizens United
- Human Rights Campaign
- League of Conservation Voters
- Planned Parenthood Action Fund
- Sierra Club

Individuals

- James L. Brooks, director, producer and writer
- Gregg Henry, actor and musician
- William Hurt, actor, director, producer and screenwriter
- Kristen Johnston, actress and comedian
- Wendie Malick, actress and activist
- Alyssa Milano, actress and activist
- Alexandra Neil, actress
- James Sie, actor and voice actor
- Alice Wetterlund, actress, comedian and podcast host

=== Predictions ===
Source	Ranking	As of
The Cook Political Report	Safe D	July 2, 2020
Inside Elections	Safe D	June 2, 2020
Sabato's Crystal Ball	Safe D	July 2, 2020
Politico	Safe D	April 19, 2020
Daily Kos	Safe D	June 3, 2020
RCP	Safe D	June 9, 2020
Niskanen	Safe D	June 7, 2020

=== Results ===
California's 12th congressional district, 2020
Primary election
Party	Candidate	Votes	%
Democratic	Nancy Pelosi (incumbent)	190,590	74.0
Democratic	Shahid Buttar	33,344	13.0
Republican	John Dennis	19,883	7.7
Democratic	Tom Gallagher (withdrawn)	5,094	2.0
Republican	Deanna Lorraine	4,635	1.8
Democratic	Agatha Bacelar	3,890	1.5
Total votes		257,436	100.0
General election
Democratic	Nancy Pelosi (incumbent)	281,776	77.6
Democratic	Shahid Buttar	81,174	22.4
Total votes		362,950	100.0
Democratic hold			

== District 13 ==
2020 California's 13th congressional district election
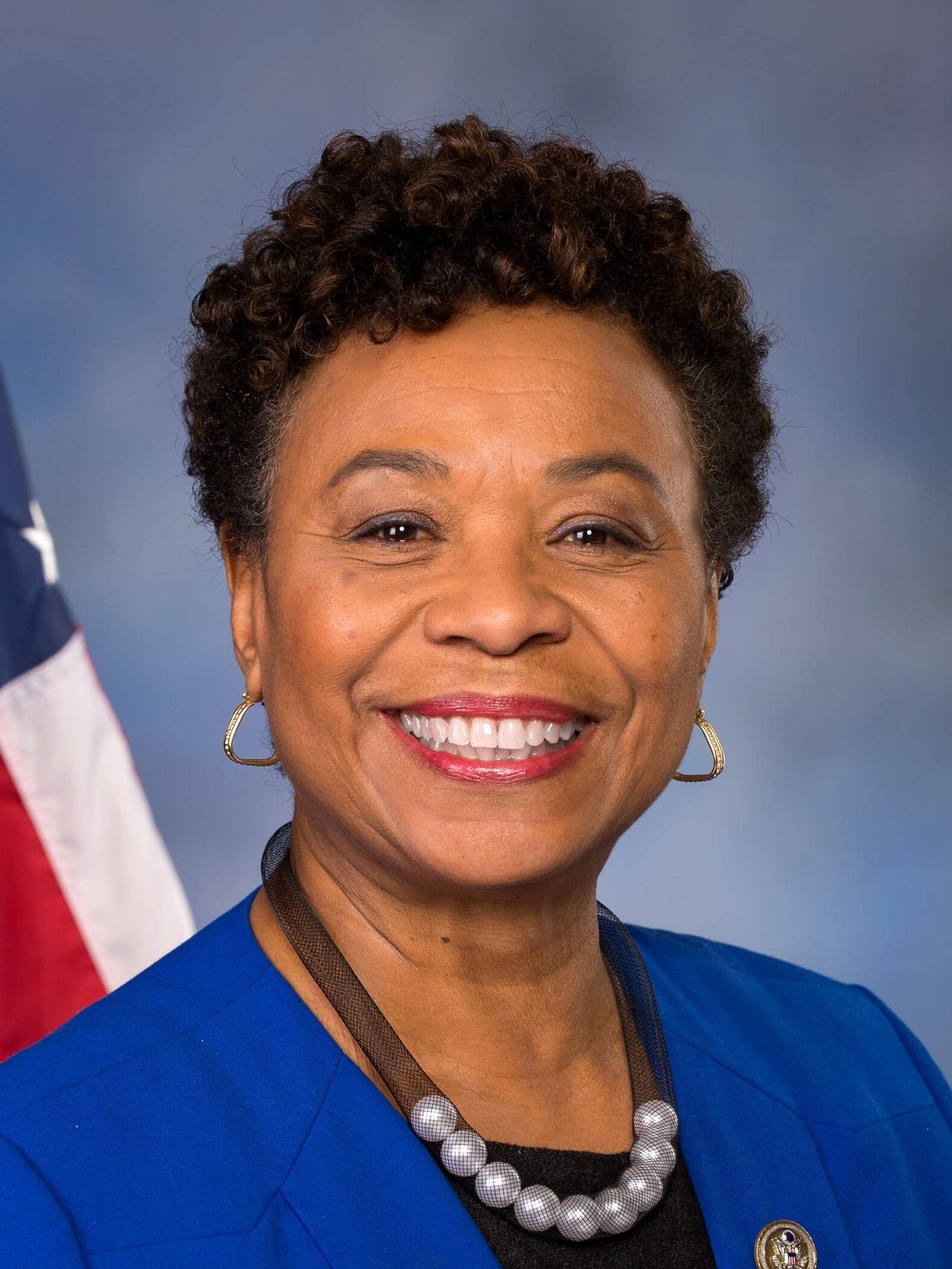

Candidate	Barbara Lee	Nikka Piterman
Party	Democratic	Republican
Popular vote	327,863	34,955
Percentage	90.4%	9.6%
- County results Lee: 90–100%
U.S. Representative before election
Barbara Lee
Democratic
Elected U.S. Representative
Barbara Lee
Democratic

The 13th district takes in northern Alameda County, encompassing Alameda, Albany, Berkeley, Emeryville, Oakland, Piedmont, and San Leandro. The incumbent was Democrat Barbara Lee, who was re-elected with 88.4% of the vote in 2018.

=== Candidates ===
==== Advanced to general ====
- Barbara Lee (Democratic), incumbent U.S. representative
- Nikka Piterman (Republican), software engineer

=== Predictions ===
Source	Ranking	As of
The Cook Political Report	Safe D	July 2, 2020
Inside Elections	Safe D	June 2, 2020
Sabato's Crystal Ball	Safe D	July 2, 2020
Politico	Safe D	April 19, 2020
Daily Kos	Safe D	June 3, 2020
RCP	Safe D	June 9, 2020
Niskanen	Safe D	June 7, 2020

=== Results ===
California's 13th congressional district, 2020
Primary election
Party	Candidate	Votes	%
Democratic	Barbara Lee (incumbent)	230,482	92.6
Republican	Nikka Piterman	18,553	7.4
Total votes		249,035	100.0
General election
Democratic	Barbara Lee (incumbent)	327,863	90.4
Republican	Nikka Piterman	34,955	9.6
Total votes		362,818	100.0
Democratic hold			

== District 14 ==
2020 California's 14th congressional district election
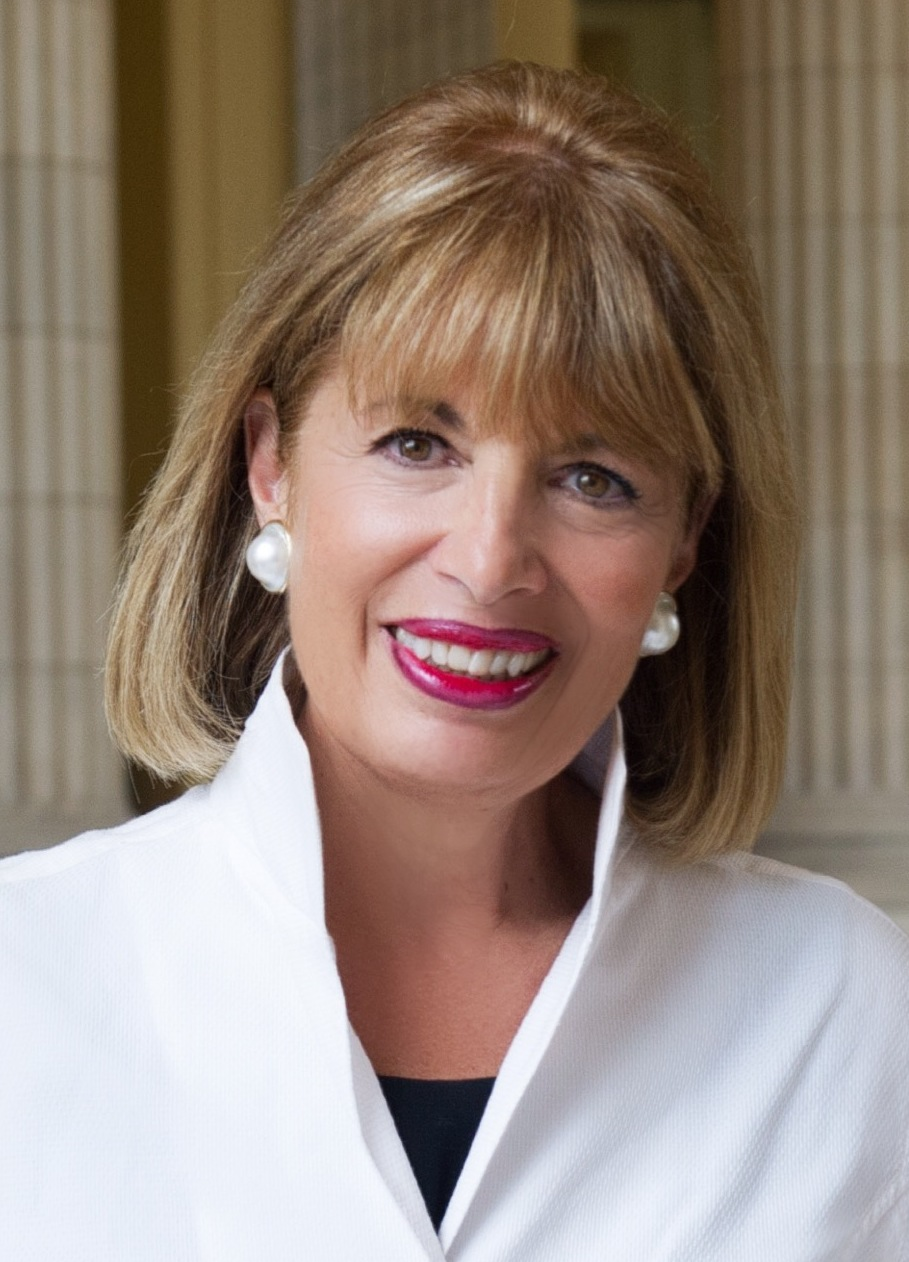

Candidate	Jackie Speier	Ran Petel
Party	Democratic	Republican
Popular vote	278,227	72,684
Percentage	79.3	20.7
- County results Speier: 70–80% 80–90%
U.S. Representative before election
Jackie Speier
Democratic
Elected U.S. Representative
Jackie Speier
Democratic

The 14th district is located on the San Francisco Peninsula, taking in most of San Mateo County and a small part of southwestern San Francisco. The incumbent was Democrat Jackie Speier, who was re-elected with 79.2% of the vote in 2018.

=== Candidates ===
==== Advanced to general ====
- Ran Petel (Republican), financial executive
- Jackie Speier (Democratic), incumbent U.S. representative

==== Eliminated in primary ====
- Cristos Goodrow (Democratic), technology executive
- Eric Taylor (no party preference), research manager

=== Predictions ===
Source	Ranking	As of
The Cook Political Report	Safe D	July 2, 2020
Inside Elections	Safe D	June 2, 2020
Sabato's Crystal Ball	Safe D	July 2, 2020
Politico	Safe D	April 19, 2020
Daily Kos	Safe D	June 3, 2020
RCP	Safe D	June 9, 2020
Niskanen	Safe D	June 7, 2020

=== Results ===
2020 California's 14th congressional district primary results by county Map legend: Speier—70–80%

California's 14th congressional district, 2020
Primary election
Party	Candidate	Votes	%
Democratic	Jackie Speier (incumbent)	158,158	77.3
Republican	Ran Petel	32,447	15.9
Democratic	Cristos Goodrow	7,843	3.8
No party preference	Eric Taylor	6,081	3.0
Total votes		204,529	100.0
General election
Democratic	Jackie Speier (incumbent)	278,300	79.3
Republican	Ran Petel	72,705	20.7
Total votes		351,005	100.0
Democratic hold			

== District 15 ==
2020 California's 15th congressional district election
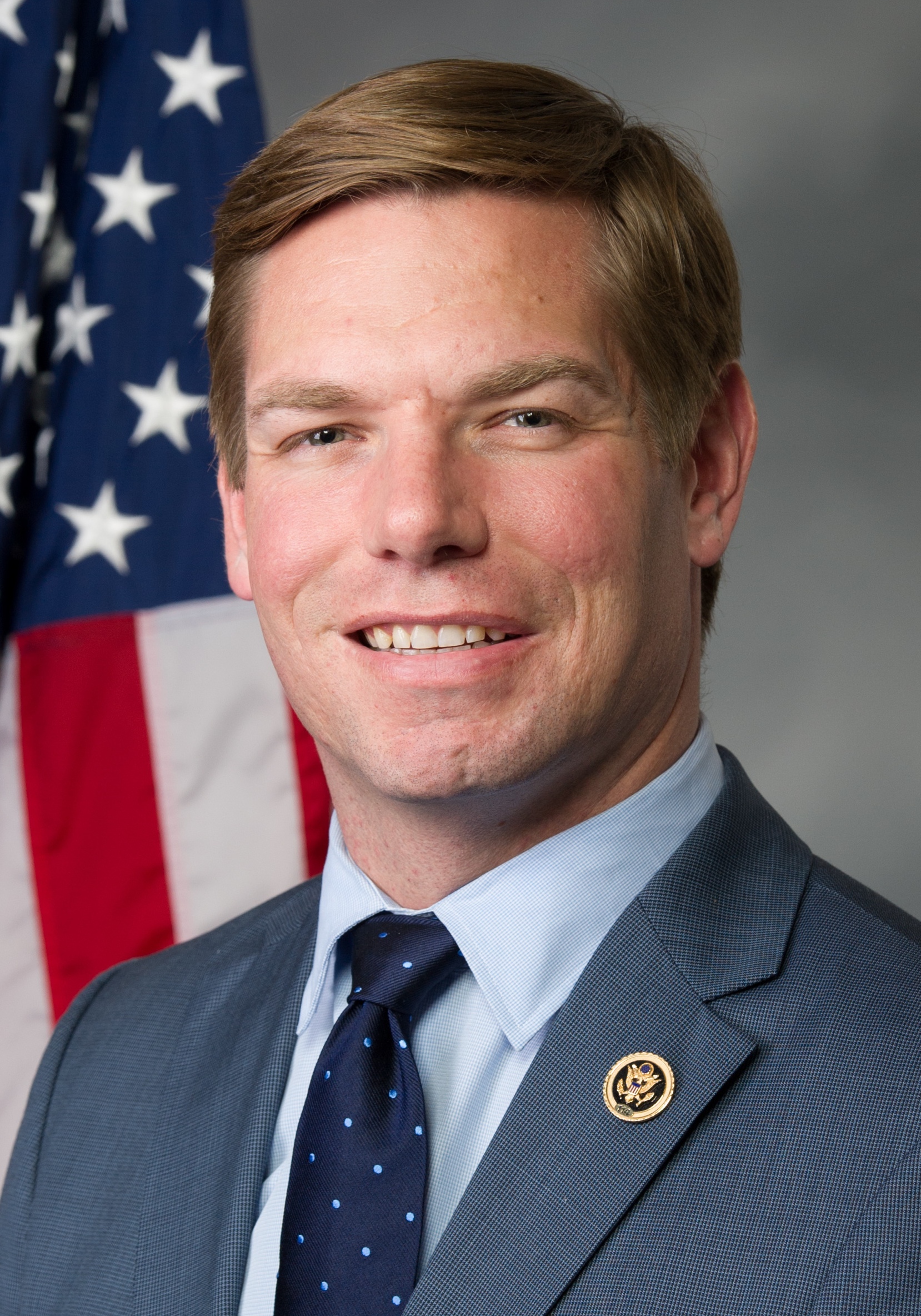

Candidate	Eric Swalwell	Alison Hayden
Party	Democratic	Republican
Popular vote	242,991	99,710
Percentage	70.9	29.1
- County results Swalwell: 60–70% 70–80%
U.S. Representative before election
Eric Swalwell
Democratic
Elected U.S. Representative
Eric Swalwell
Democratic

The 15th district encompasses eastern Alameda County, including Castro Valley, Dublin, Fremont, Hayward, Livermore, Pleasanton, Sunol, Union City, and parts of Contra Costa County, including San Ramon and part of Danville. The incumbent was Democrat Eric Swalwell, who was re-elected with 73.0% of the vote in 2018, and ran in the 2020 presidential race. Swalwell joined the House race after ending his presidential campaign.

=== Candidates ===
==== Advanced to general ====
- Alison Hayden (Republican), special education teacher
- Eric Swalwell (Democratic), incumbent U.S. representative

==== Eliminated in primary ====
- Samantha Campbell (Democratic), college student
- Don J. Grundmann (no party preference), chiropractor (Constitution) (Note: Note: The Constitution party does not have ballot access in California. Don J. Grundmann (C-district 15) appears on the ballot as "No party preference.")
- Austin E. Intal (Democratic), sales and real estate agent
- Peter Yuan Liu (Republican), candidate for governor of California in 2018
- Tuan Phan (Democratic), biochemist

==== Withdrawn ====
- Aisha Wahab (Democratic), Hayward city councilwoman
- Bob Wieckowski (Democratic), state senator

==== Declined ====
- Catharine Baker (Republican), former state assemblywoman
- Rob Bonta (Democratic), state assemblyman (running for re-election)
- Ellen Corbett (Democratic), former majority leader of the California State Senate
- Scott Haggerty (Democratic), Alameda County supervisor
- Nancy O'Malley (Democratic), Alameda County district attorney
- Bill Quirk (Democratic), state assemblyman
- Tim Sbranti (Democratic), former mayor of Dublin

=== Predictions ===
Source	Ranking	As of
The Cook Political Report	Safe D	July 2, 2020
Inside Elections	Safe D	June 2, 2020
Sabato's Crystal Ball	Safe D	July 2, 2020
Politico	Safe D	April 19, 2020
Daily Kos	Safe D	June 3, 2020
RCP	Safe D	June 9, 2020
Niskanen	Safe D	June 7, 2020

=== Results ===
2020 California's 15th congressional district primary results by county Map legend: Swalwell—60–70%; Swalwell—50–60%

California's 15th congressional district, 2020
Primary election
Party	Candidate	Votes	%
Democratic	Eric Swalwell (incumbent)	103,826	59.0
Republican	Alison Hayden	29,864	17.0
Democratic	Samantha Campbell	17,286	9.8
Republican	Peter Liu	13,634	7.8
Democratic	Tuan Phan	6,509	3.7
Democratic	Austin E. Intal	2,548	1.4
No party preference	Don J. Grundmann	2,194	1.2
Total votes		175,861	100.0
General election
Democratic	Eric Swalwell (incumbent)	242,991	70.9
Republican	Alison Hayden	99,710	29.1
Total votes		342,701	100.0
Democratic hold			

== District 16 ==
2020 California's 16th congressional district election
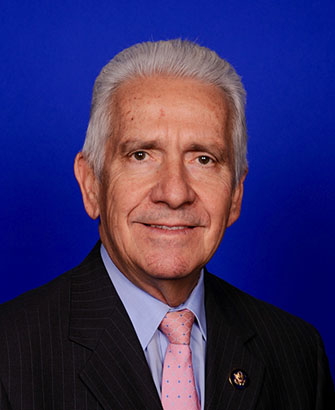

Candidate	Jim Costa	Kevin Cookingham
Party	Democratic	Republican
Popular vote	128,690	88,039
Percentage	59.4%	40.6%
- County results Costa: 50–60% 60–70% Cookingham: 50–60%
U.S. Representative before election
Jim Costa
Democratic
Elected U.S. Representative
Jim Costa
Democratic

The 16th district is located in central San Joaquin Valley, including the cities of Madera, Merced, and the western half of Fresno. The incumbent was Democrat Jim Costa, who was re-elected with 57.5% of the vote in 2018.

=== Candidates ===
==== Advanced to general ====
- Kevin Cookingham (Republican), former Clovis Unified School District educator
- Jim Costa (Democratic), incumbent U.S. representative

==== Eliminated in primary ====
- Esmeralda Soria (Democratic), Fresno city councilwoman
- Kimberly Elizabeth Williams (Democratic), former U.S. diplomat and college professor

==== Declined ====
- Mike Murphy (Republican), mayor of Merced

=== Endorsements ===
Kevin Cookingham (R)

Organizations

- Fresno County Republican Party
Jim Costa (D)

Federal politicians

- Kamala Harris, U.S. senator (D-CA); 2020 vice presidential nominee

Organizations

- Blue Dog Coalition
- Equality California
- Human Rights Campaign
- Humane Society of the United States Legislative Fund
- Planned Parenthood

Unions

- California Teachers Association
- National Education Association
Esmeralda Soria (D)

State politicians

- Anna Caballero, state senator

Individuals

- Dolores Huerta, labor activist and civil rights leader

Labor unions

- International Association of Fire Fighters Local 753
- International Brotherhood of Electrical Workers Local 100
- International Brotherhood of Teamsters Local 431
- Service Employees International Union California State Council
- Sheet Metal Workers' International Association Local 162
- United Brotherhood of Carpenters and Joiners of America Local 701

Organizations

- California Young Democrats
- Courage California
Kimberly Williams (D)

Organizations

- Brand New Congress

=== Predictions ===
Source	Ranking	As of
The Cook Political Report	Safe D	July 2, 2020
Inside Elections	Safe D	June 2, 2020
Sabato's Crystal Ball	Safe D	July 2, 2020
Politico	Likely D	April 19, 2020
Daily Kos	Safe D	June 3, 2020
RCP	Safe D	June 9, 2020
Niskanen	Safe D	June 7, 2020

=== Results ===
2020 California's 16th congressional district primary results by county Map legend: Costa—40–50%; Cookingham—30–40%; Cookingham—50–60%

California's 16th congressional district, 2020
Primary election
Party	Candidate	Votes	%
Democratic	Jim Costa (incumbent)	41,228	37.5
Republican	Kevin Cookingham	38,652	35.2
Democratic	Esmeralda Soria	23,484	21.4
Democratic	Kimberly Elizabeth Williams	6,458	5.9
Total votes		109,822	100.0
General election
Democratic	Jim Costa (incumbent)	128,690	59.4
Republican	Kevin Cookingham	88,039	40.6
Total votes		216,729	100.0
Democratic hold			

== District 17 ==
2020 California's 17th congressional district election
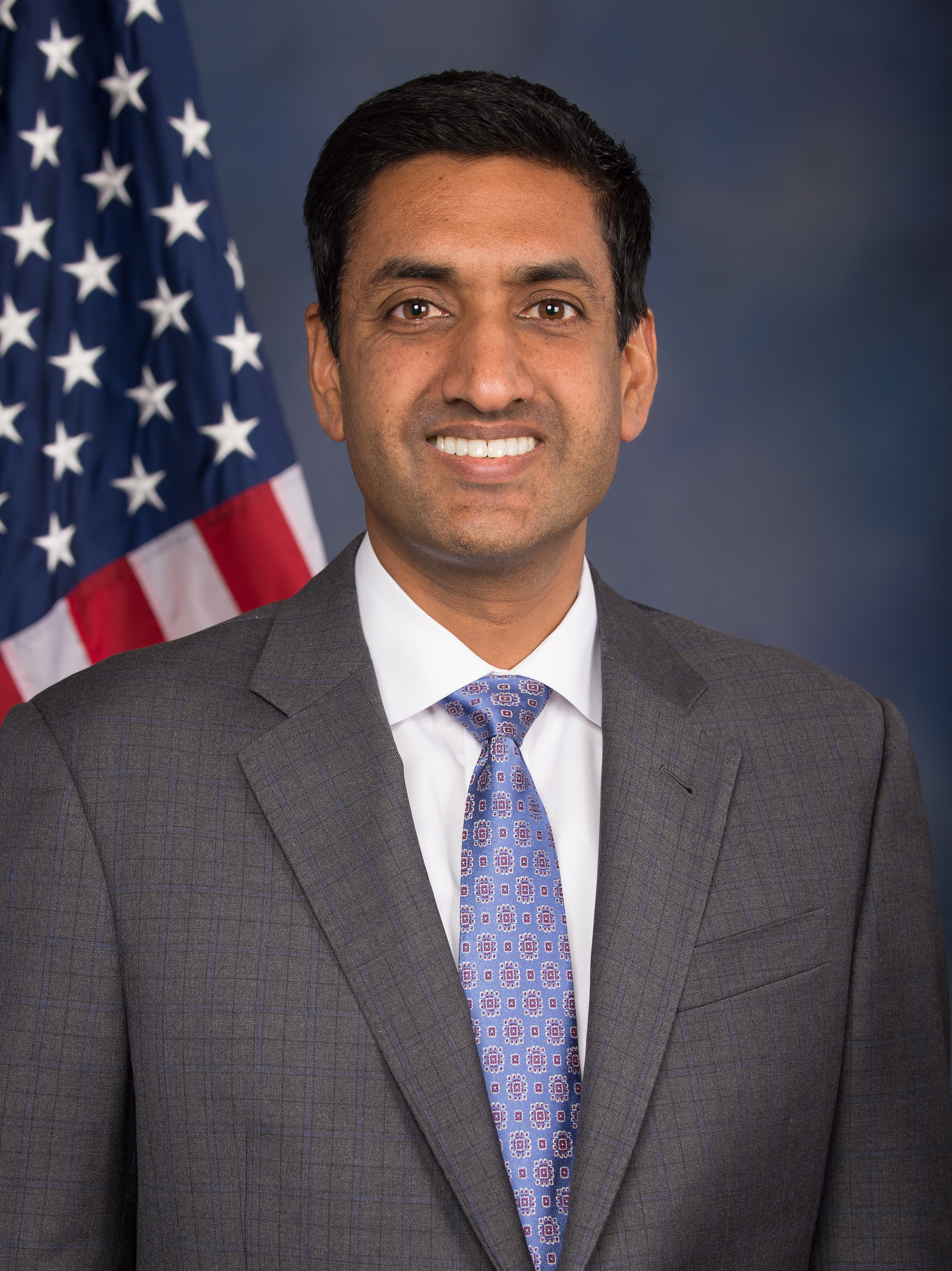

Candidate	Ro Khanna	Ritesh Tandon
Party	Democratic	Republican
Popular vote	212,137	85,199
Percentage	71.3	28.7
- County results Khanna: 70–80%
U.S. Representative before election
Ro Khanna
Democratic
Elected U.S. Representative
Ro Khanna
Democratic

The 17th district encompasses parts of the Silicon Valley, taking in Sunnyvale, Cupertino, Santa Clara, Milpitas, Newark, most of Fremont, and a small part of northern San Jose. The incumbent was Democrat Ro Khanna, who was re-elected with 75.3% of the vote in 2018.

=== Candidates ===
==== Advanced to general ====
- Ro Khanna (Democratic), incumbent U.S. representative
- Ritesh Tandon (Republican), businessman

==== Eliminated in primary ====
- Joe Dehn (Libertarian), square dance caller
- Stephen Forbes (Democratic), business analyst and candidate for California's 17th congressional district in 2018

=== Endorsements ===
Ro Khanna (D)

U.S. senators

- Bernie Sanders (I-VT), 2020 Democratic presidential candidate

Organizations

- California League of Conservation Voters
- Democratic Socialists of America Silicon Valley
- Human Rights Campaign
- Justice Democrats
- National Iranian American Council
- Planned Parenthood Action Fund
- Sierra Club

=== Predictions ===
Source	Ranking	As of
The Cook Political Report	Safe D	July 2, 2020
Inside Elections	Safe D	June 2, 2020
Sabato's Crystal Ball	Safe D	July 2, 2020
Politico	Safe D	April 19, 2020
Daily Kos	Safe D	June 3, 2020
RCP	Safe D	June 9, 2020
Niskanen	Safe D	June 7, 2020

=== Results ===
2020 California's 17th congressional district primary results by county Map legend: Khanna—60–70%

California's 17th congressional district, 2020
Primary election
Party	Candidate	Votes	%
Democratic	Ro Khanna (incumbent)	107,638	68.6
Republican	Ritesh Tandon	33,527	21.4
Democratic	Stephen Forbes	12,110	7.7
Libertarian	Joe Dehn	3,523	2.2
Total votes		156,798	100.0
General election
Democratic	Ro Khanna (incumbent)	212,137	71.3
Republican	Ritesh Tandon	85,199	28.7
Total votes		297,336	100.0
Democratic hold			

== District 18 ==
2020 California's 18th congressional district election
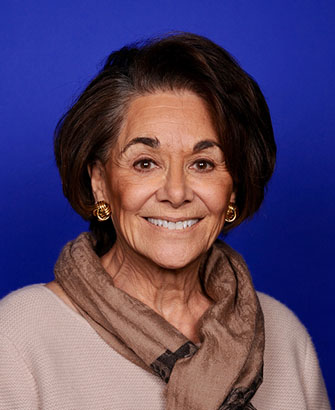

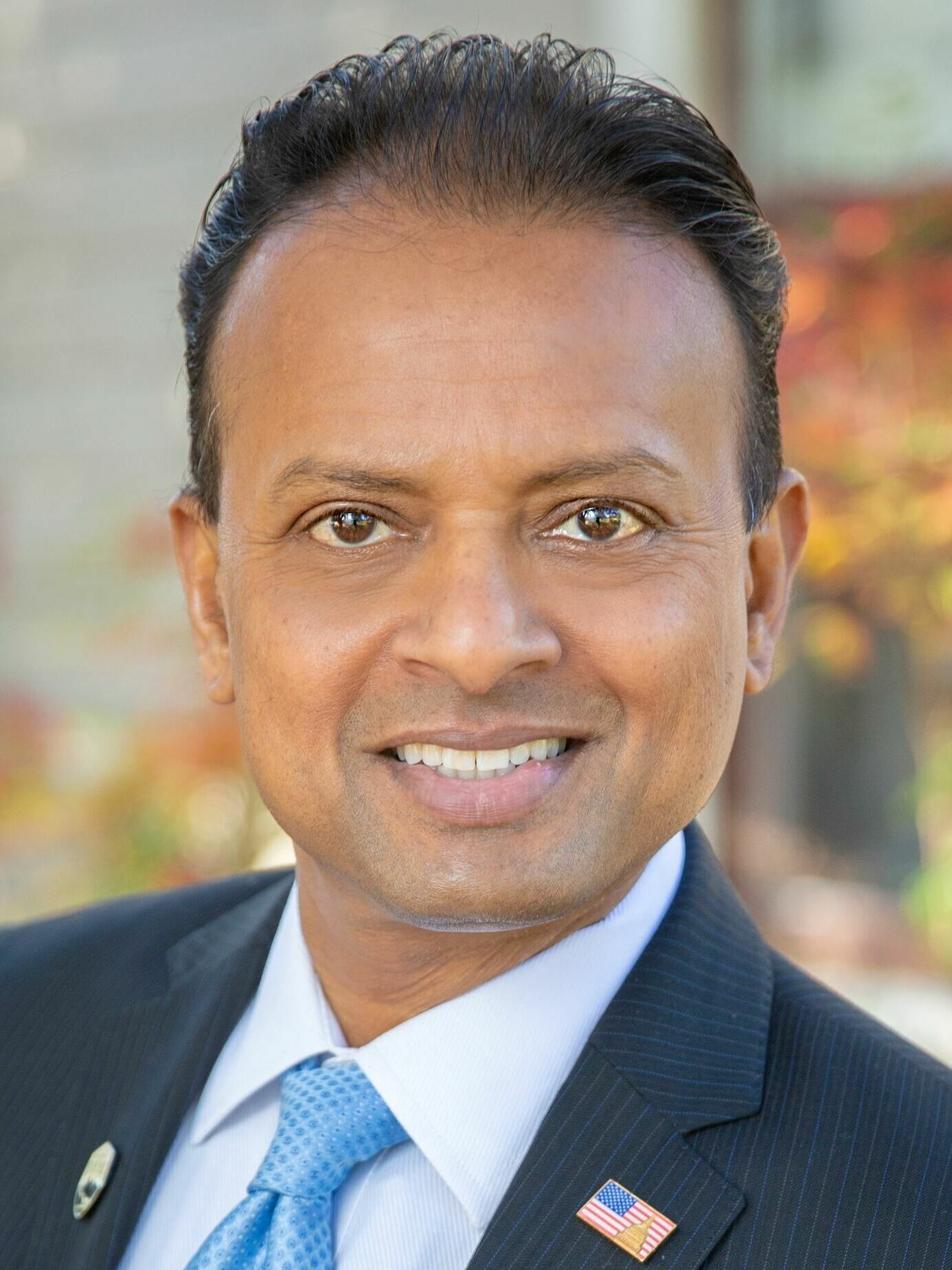
Candidate	Anna Eshoo	Rishi Kumar
Party	Democratic	Democratic
Popular vote	217,377	126,750
Percentage	63.2	36.8
U.S. Representative before election
Anna Eshoo
Democratic
Elected U.S. Representative
Anna Eshoo
Democratic

The 18th district encompasses the western San Francisco South Bay and includes the cities of Palo Alto, Redwood City, Menlo Park, Stanford, Los Altos, Mountain View, Campbell, Saratoga, and Los Gatos, as well as part of San Jose. The incumbent was Democrat Anna Eshoo, who was re-elected with 74.5% of the vote in 2018.

=== Candidates ===
==== Advanced to general ====
- Anna Eshoo (Democratic), incumbent U.S. representative
- Rishi Kumar (Democratic), Saratoga city councilman

==== Eliminated in primary ====
- Richard B. Fox (Republican), physician
- Bob Goodwyn (Libertarian), pilot
- Phil Reynolds (Republican), engineer

=== Predictions ===
Source	Ranking	As of
The Cook Political Report	Safe D	July 2, 2020
Inside Elections	Safe D	June 2, 2020
Sabato's Crystal Ball	Safe D	July 2, 2020
Politico	Safe D	April 19, 2020
Daily Kos	Safe D	June 3, 2020
RCP	Safe D	June 9, 2020
Niskanen	Safe D	June 7, 2020

=== Results ===
2020 California's 18th congressional district primary results by county Map legend: Eshoo—70–80%; Eshoo—60–70%; Eshoo—50–60%

California's 18th congressional district, 2020
Primary election
Party	Candidate	Votes	%
Democratic	Anna Eshoo (incumbent)	146,225	61.7
Democratic	Rishi Kumar	38,826	16.4
Republican	Richard B. Fox	28,863	12.2
Republican	Phil Reynolds	18,600	7.9
Libertarian	Bob Goodwyn	4,462	1.9
Total votes		236,976	100.0
General election
Democratic	Anna Eshoo (incumbent)	217,388	63.2
Democratic	Rishi Kumar	126,751	36.8
Total votes		344,139	100.0
Democratic hold			

== District 19 ==
2020 California's 19th congressional district election
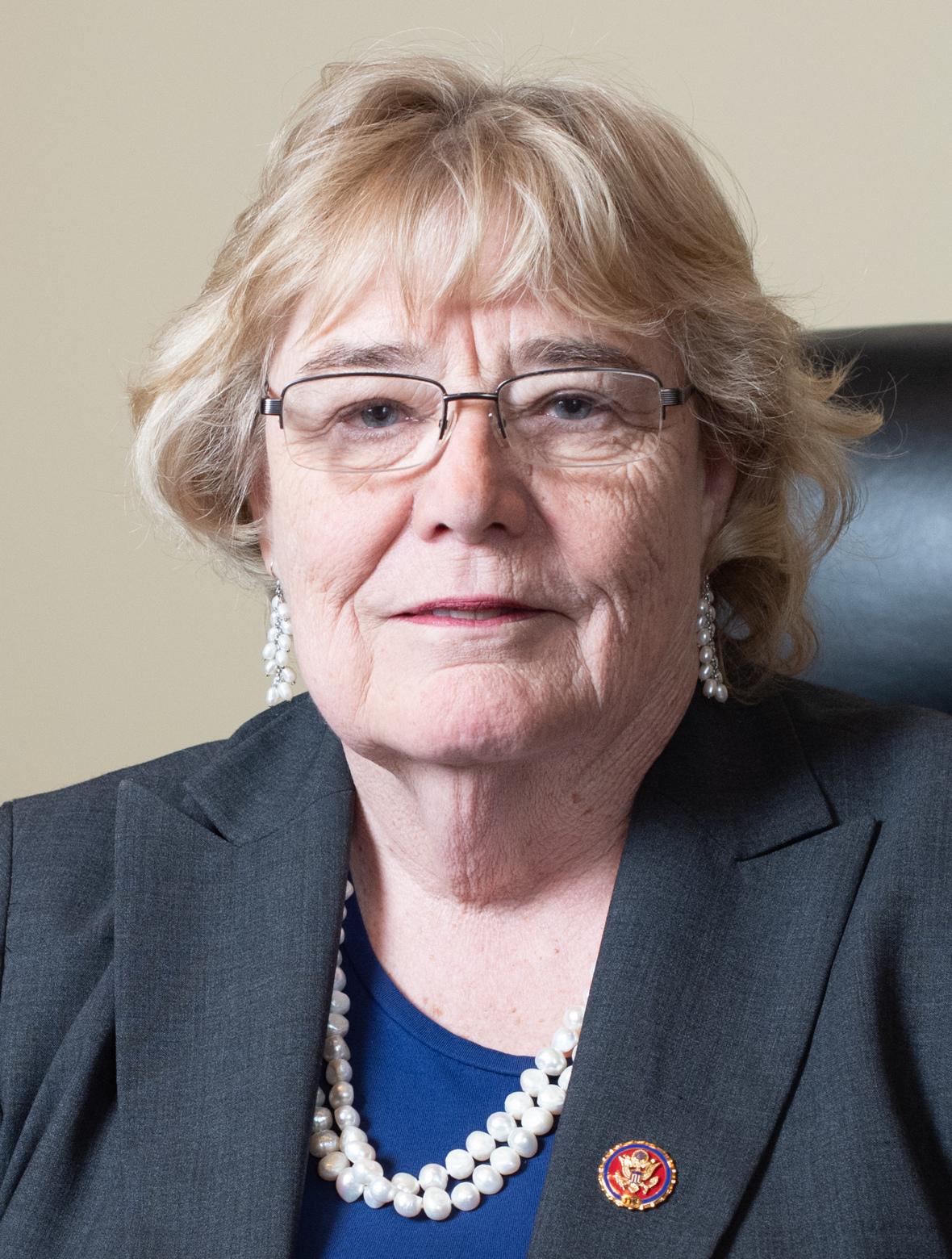

Candidate	Zoe Lofgren	Justin Aguilera
Party	Democratic	Republican
Popular vote	224,385	88,642
Percentage	71.7%	28.3%
- County results Lofgren: 70–80%
U.S. Representative before election
Zoe Lofgren
Democratic
Elected U.S. Representative
Zoe Lofgren
Democratic

The 19th district is based in the eastern San Francisco South Bay centering on San Jose, as well as taking in Morgan Hill. The incumbent was Democrat Zoe Lofgren, who was re-elected with 73.8% of the vote in 2018.

=== Candidates ===
==== Advanced to general ====
- Justin Aguilera (Republican), businessman
- Zoe Lofgren (Democratic), incumbent U.S. representative

==== Eliminated in primary ====
- Ignacio Cruz (Republican), economic development director
- Jason Mallory (no party preference)
- Ivan Torres (Democratic), healthcare worker

=== Predictions ===
Source	Ranking	As of
The Cook Political Report	Safe D	July 2, 2020
Inside Elections	Safe D	June 2, 2020
Sabato's Crystal Ball	Safe D	July 2, 2020
Politico	Safe D	April 19, 2020
Daily Kos	Safe D	June 3, 2020
RCP	Safe D	June 9, 2020
Niskanen	Safe D	June 7, 2020

=== Results ===
California's 19th congressional district, 2020
Primary election
Party	Candidate	Votes	%
Democratic	Zoe Lofgren (incumbent)	104,456	62.7
Republican	Justin Aguilera	20,469	12.3
Republican	Ignacio Cruz	19,109	11.5
Democratic	Ivan Torres	18,916	11.4
No party preference	Jason Mallory	3,516	2.1
Total votes		166,466	100.0
General election
Democratic	Zoe Lofgren (incumbent)	224,385	71.7
Republican	Justin Aguilera	88,642	28.3
Total votes		313,027	100.0
Democratic hold			

== District 20 ==
2020 California's 20th congressional district election
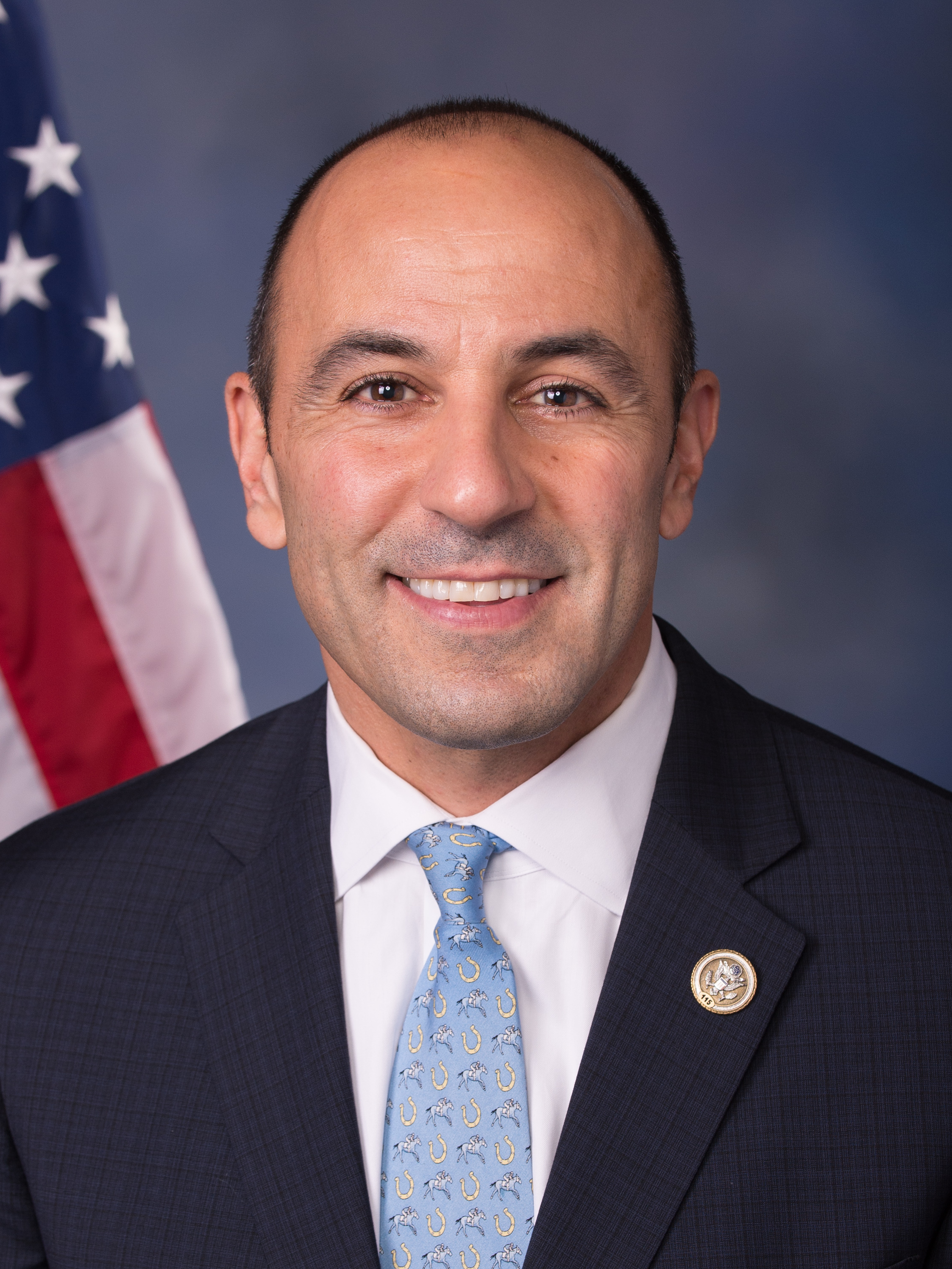

Candidate	Jimmy Panetta	Jeff Gorman
Party	Democratic	Republican
Popular vote	236,896	71,658
Percentage	76.8	23.2
- County results Panetta: 60–70% 70–80% 80–90%
U.S. Representative before election
Jimmy Panetta
Democratic
Elected U.S. Representative
Jimmy Panetta
Democratic

The 20th district encompasses the Monterey Bay Area, including Santa Cruz, Salinas, and Gilroy. The incumbent was Democrat Jimmy Panetta, who was re-elected with 81.4% of the vote in 2018.

=== Candidates ===
==== Advanced to general ====
- Jeff Gorman (Republican), financial adviser
- Jimmy Panetta (Democratic), incumbent U.S. representative

==== Eliminated in primary ====
- Adam Bolaños Scow (Democratic), environmental activist

=== Predictions ===
Source	Ranking	As of
The Cook Political Report	Safe D	July 2, 2020
Inside Elections	Safe D	June 2, 2020
Sabato's Crystal Ball	Safe D	July 2, 2020
Politico	Safe D	April 19, 2020
Daily Kos	Safe D	June 3, 2020
RCP	Safe D	June 9, 2020
Niskanen	Safe D	June 7, 2020

=== Results ===
2020 California's 20th congressional district primary results by county Map legend: Panetta—60–70%

California's 20th congressional district, 2020
Primary election
Party	Candidate	Votes	%
Democratic	Jimmy Panetta (incumbent)	123,615	66.2
Republican	Jeff Gorman	38,001	20.3
Democratic	Adam Bolaños Scow	25,172	13.5
Total votes		186,788	100.0
General election
Democratic	Jimmy Panetta (incumbent)	236,896	76.8
Republican	Jeff Gorman	71,658	23.2
Total votes		308,554	100.0
Democratic hold			

== District 21 ==
2020 California's 21st congressional district election
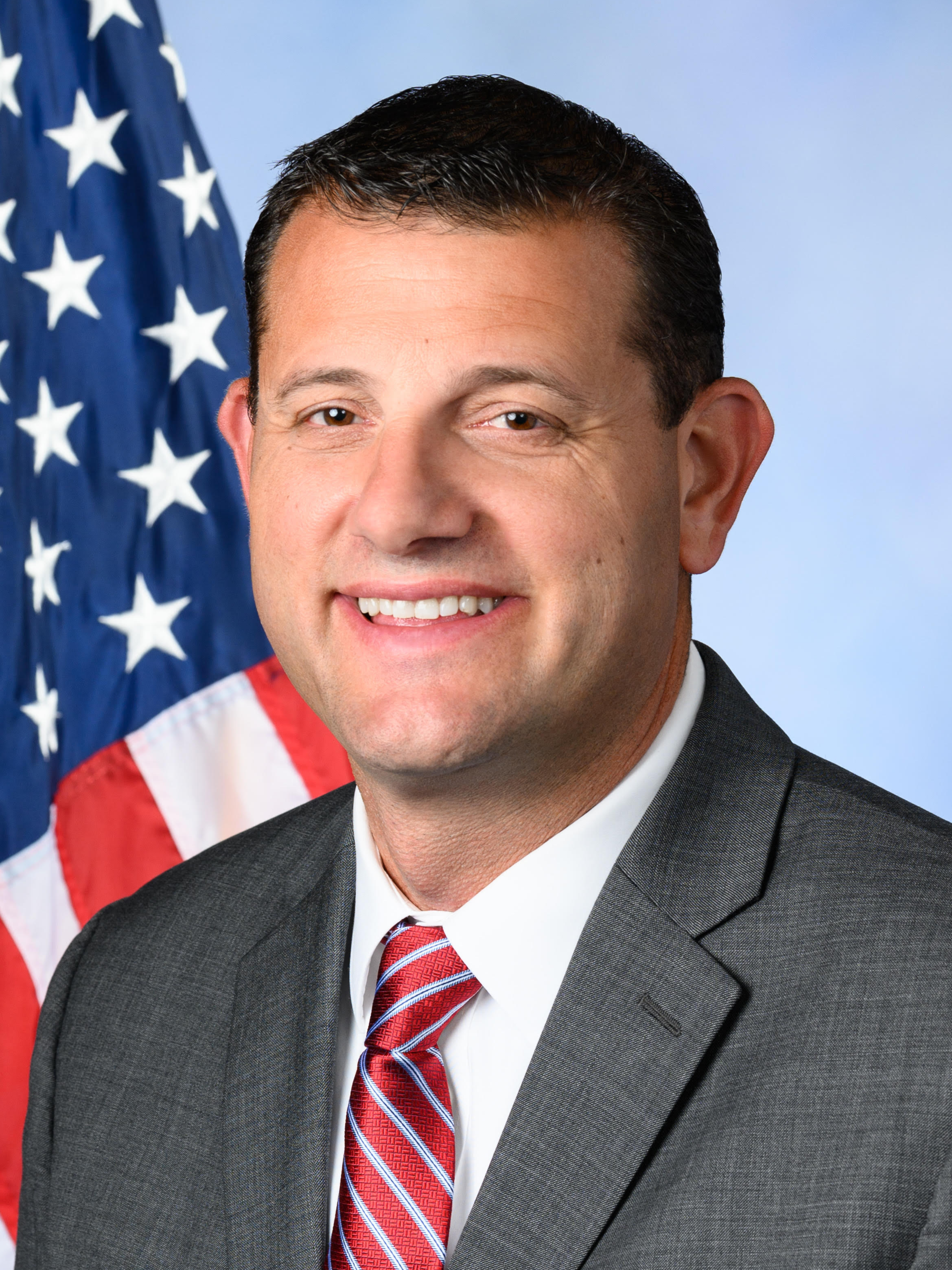

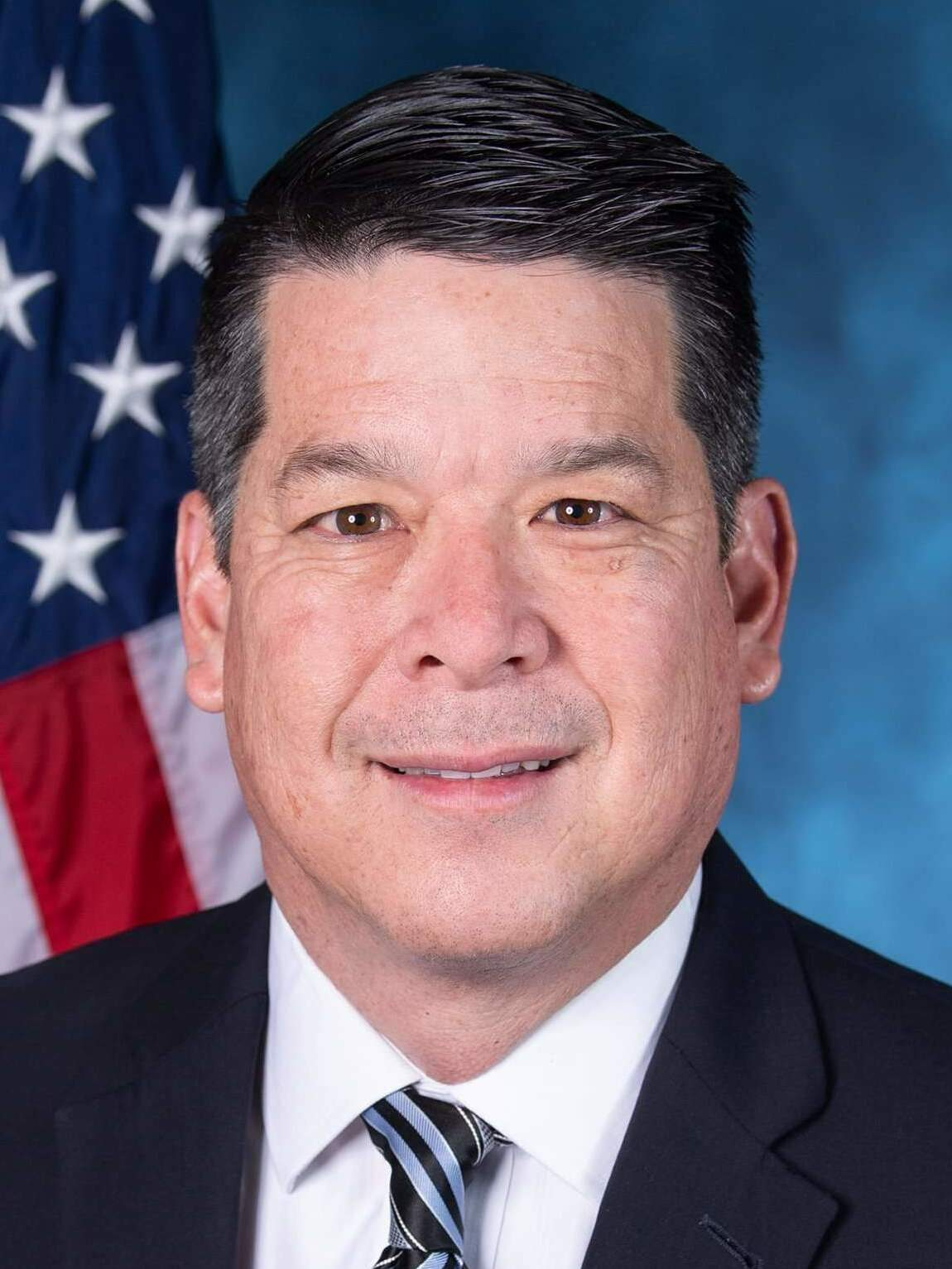
Candidate	David Valadao	TJ Cox
Party	Republican	Democratic
Popular vote	85,928	84,406
Percentage	50.5%	49.5%
- County results Valadao: 50–60% 60–70% Cox: 50–60%
U.S. Representative before election
TJ Cox
Democratic
Elected U.S. Representative
David Valadao
Republican

The 21st district covers San Joaquin Valley, including Coalinga, Delano, Hanford, and parts of Bakersfield, specifically East Bakersfield and Downtown Bakersfield. The incumbent was Democrat TJ Cox, who flipped the district and was elected in 2018 with 50.4% of the vote.

=== Candidates ===
==== Advanced to general ====
- TJ Cox (Democratic), incumbent U.S. representative
- David Valadao (Republican), former U.S. representative

==== Eliminated in primary ====
- Ricardo De La Fuente (Democratic), businessman and son of Rocky De La Fuente
- Rocky De La Fuente (Republican), candidate for U.S. president in 2016 and 2020, and perennial candidate

==== Declined ====
- Ruben Macareno (no party preference), Farmersville city councilman and former chair of the Tulare County Democratic Party

=== Endorsements ===
TJ Cox (D)

Executive branch officials

- Barack Obama, former president of the United States (2009–2017)

Labor unions

- California Labor Federation
- Service Employees International Union California
- United Farm Workers

Organizations

- 314 Action
- Asian American Action Fund
- California Teachers Association
- End Citizens United
- Equality California
- Giffords
- Human Rights Campaign
- Humane Society of the United States Legislative Fund
- Indivisible 435
- J Street PAC
- League of Conservation Voters Action Fund
- NARAL Pro-Choice America
- New Democrat Coalition
- Planned Parenthood Action Fund
- Sierra Club
- Stonewall Democrats
David Valadao (R)

Organizations

- Fresno County Republican Party

Publications

- The Fresno Bee

=== Predictions ===
Source	Ranking	As of
The Cook Political Report	Tossup	July 2, 2020
Inside Elections	Tossup	October 1, 2020
Sabato's Crystal Ball	Lean D	November 2, 2020
Politico	Tossup	April 19, 2020
Daily Kos	Tossup	October 19, 2020
RCP	Tossup	June 9, 2020
Niskanen	Likely D	June 7, 2020

=== Polling ===
==== General election ====
Poll source	Date(s) administered	Sample size	Margin of error	TJ Cox (D)	David Valadao (R)	Undecided
American Viewpoint (R) (Note: Poll sponsored by the CLF, which endorsed Valadao prior to this poll's sampling period.)	September 8–10, 2020	400 (LV)	± 4.9%	38%	49%	9%
NRCC (R)	June 30 – July 2, 2019	400 (LV)	–	36%	52%	11%

=== Results ===
2020 California's 21st congressional district primary results by county Map legend: Valadao—60–70%; Valadao—50–60%; Cox—40–50%

California's 21st congressional district, 2020
Primary election
Party	Candidate	Votes	%
Republican	David Valadao	39,488	49.7
Democratic	TJ Cox (incumbent)	30,697	38.7
Democratic	Ricardo De La Fuente	7,309	9.2
Republican	Rocky De La Fuente	1,912	2.4
Total votes		79,406	100.0
General election
Republican	David Valadao	85,928	50.5
Democratic	TJ Cox (incumbent)	84,406	49.5
Total votes		170,334	100.0
Republican gain from Democratic			

== District 22 ==
2020 California's 22nd congressional district election
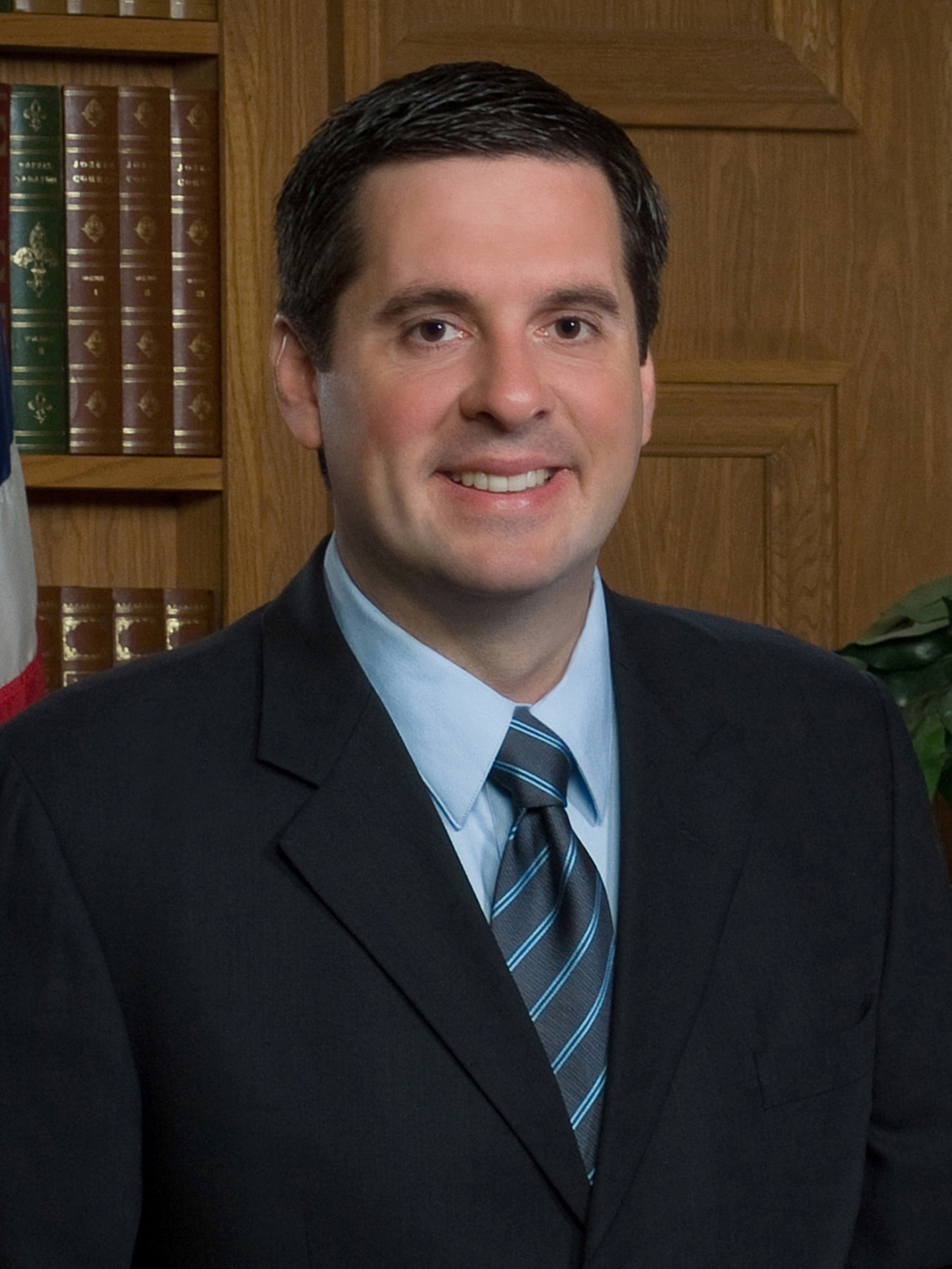

Candidate	Devin Nunes	Phil Arballo
Party	Republican	Democratic
Popular vote	170,888	144,251
Percentage	54.2%	45.8%
- County results Nunes: 50–60%
U.S. Representative before election
Devin Nunes
Republican
Elected U.S. Representative
Devin Nunes
Republican

The 22nd district covers San Joaquin Valley, including eastern Fresno, Clovis, Tulare, and Visalia. The incumbent was Republican Devin Nunes, who was re-elected with 52.7% of the vote in 2018.

=== Candidates ===
==== Advanced to general ====
- Phil Arballo (Democratic), financial adviser
- Devin Nunes (Republican), incumbent U.S. representative

==== Eliminated in primary ====
- Bobby Bliatout (Democratic), healthcare executive and candidate for California's 22nd congressional district in 2018
- Eric Garcia (no party preference), graduate student
- Dary Rezvani (Democratic), management consultant

==== Declined ====
- Ricardo Franco (Democratic), candidate for California's 22nd congressional district in 2018
- Andrew Janz (Democratic), Fresno County prosecutor and nominee for California's 22nd congressional district in 2018 (running for mayor of Fresno)

==== Endorsements ====
Phil Arballo (D)

Organizations

- California League of Conservation Voters

Labor unions

- California Teachers Association
Devin Nunes (R)

Organizations

- Fresno County Republican Party
Dary Rezvani (D)

Organizations

- National Iranian American Council

=== Predictions ===
Source	Ranking	As of
The Cook Political Report	Likely R	July 2, 2020
Inside Elections	Safe R	June 2, 2020
Sabato's Crystal Ball	Safe R	July 2, 2020
Politico	Likely R	April 19, 2020
Daily Kos	Safe R	June 3, 2020
RCP	Likely R	June 9, 2020
Niskanen	Likely R	June 7, 2020

=== Polling ===
==== General election ====
Poll source	Date(s) administered	Sample size	Margin of error	Devin Nunes (R)	Phil Arballo (D)	Undecided
Strategies 360 (D) (Note: Poll conducted for Arballo's campaign.)	September 29 – October 1, 2020	400 (LV)	± 4.9%	51%	46%	–
Strategies 360 (D)	June 23–29, 2020 (Note: Additional data sourced from FiveThirtyEight)	400 (LV)	–	51%	42%	–

=== Results ===
2020 California's 22nd congressional district primary results by county Map legend: Nunes—50–60%

California's 22nd congressional district, 2020
Primary election
Party	Candidate	Votes	%
Republican	Devin Nunes (incumbent)	94,686	56.1
Democratic	Phil Arballo	42,218	25.0
Democratic	Bobby Bliatout	22,078	13.1
Democratic	Dary Rezvani	5,273	3.1
No party preference	Eric Garcia	4,515	2.7
Total votes		168,770	100.0
General election
Republican	Devin Nunes (incumbent)	170,888	54.2
Democratic	Phil Arballo	144,251	45.8
Total votes		315,139	100.0
Republican hold			

== District 23 ==
2020 California's 23rd congressional district election
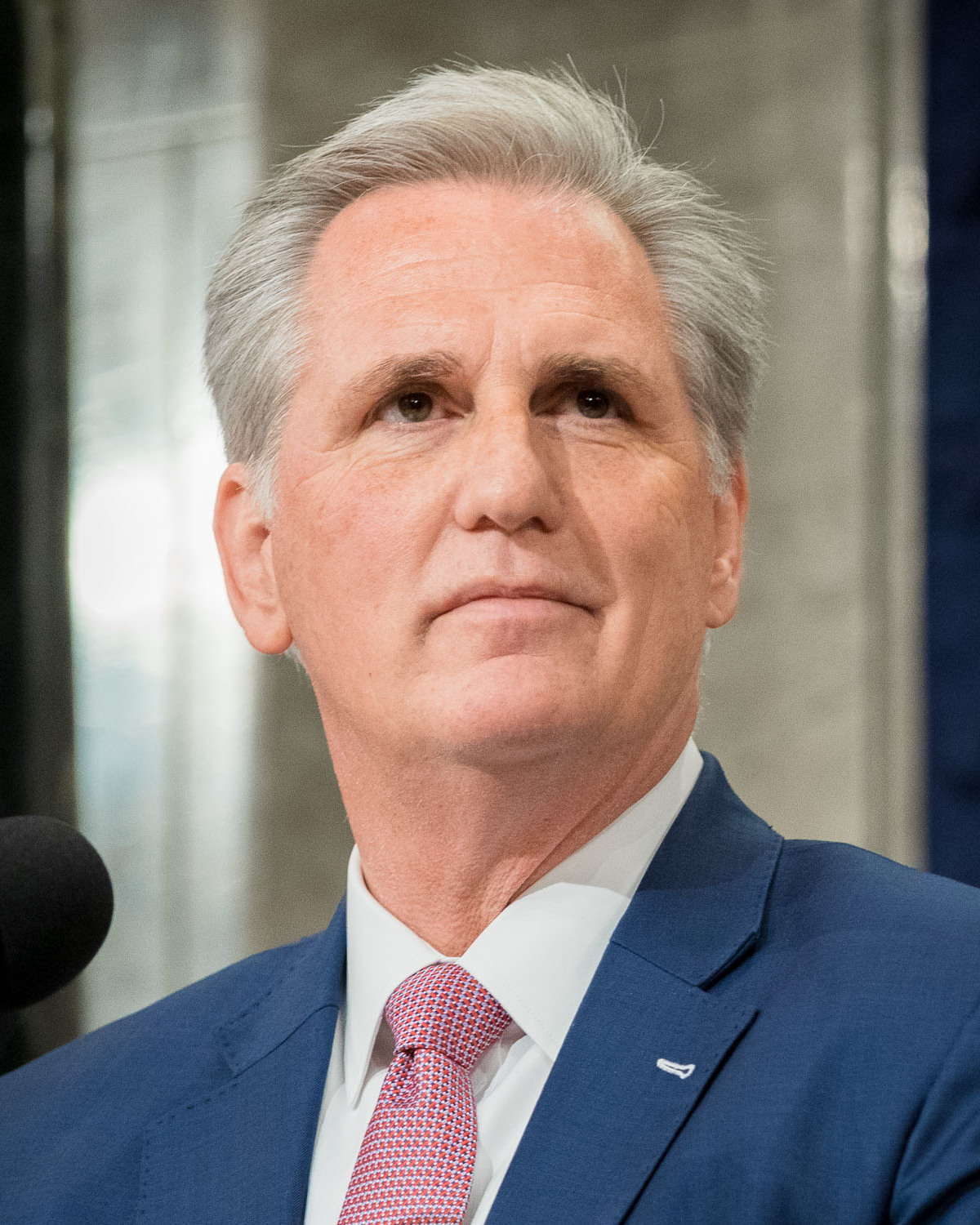

Candidate	Kevin McCarthy	Kim Mangone
Party	Republican	Democratic
Popular vote	190,222	115,896
Percentage	62.1%	37.9%
- County results Mccarthy: 50–60% 60–70%
U.S. Representative before election
Kevin McCarthy
Republican
Elected U.S. Representative
Kevin McCarthy
Republican

The 23rd district is based in the southern Central Valley, taking in parts of Bakersfield, Porterville, California City, Ridgecrest, western Lancaster, Rosamond, and Quartz Hill. The incumbent was House Minority Leader, Republican Kevin McCarthy, who was re-elected with 63.7% of the vote in 2018.

=== Candidates ===
==== Advanced to general ====
- Kim Mangone (Democratic), systems engineer and U.S. Air Force veteran
- Kevin McCarthy (Republican), incumbent U.S. representative

=== Predictions ===
Source	Ranking	As of
The Cook Political Report	Safe R	July 2, 2020
Inside Elections	Safe R	June 2, 2020
Sabato's Crystal Ball	Safe R	July 2, 2020
Politico	Safe R	April 19, 2020
Daily Kos	Safe R	June 3, 2020
RCP	Safe R	June 9, 2020
Niskanen	Safe R	June 7, 2020

=== Results ===
2020 California's 23rd congressional district primary results by county Map legend: McCarthy—60–70%; McCarthy—50–60%

California's 23rd congressional district, 2020
Primary election
Party	Candidate	Votes	%
Republican	Kevin McCarthy (incumbent)	107,897	66.5
Democratic	Kim Mangone	54,375	33.5
Total votes		162,272	100.0
General election
Republican	Kevin McCarthy (incumbent)	190,222	62.1
Democratic	Kim Mangone	115,896	37.9
Total votes		306,118	100.0
Republican hold			

== District 24 ==
2020 California's 24th congressional district election
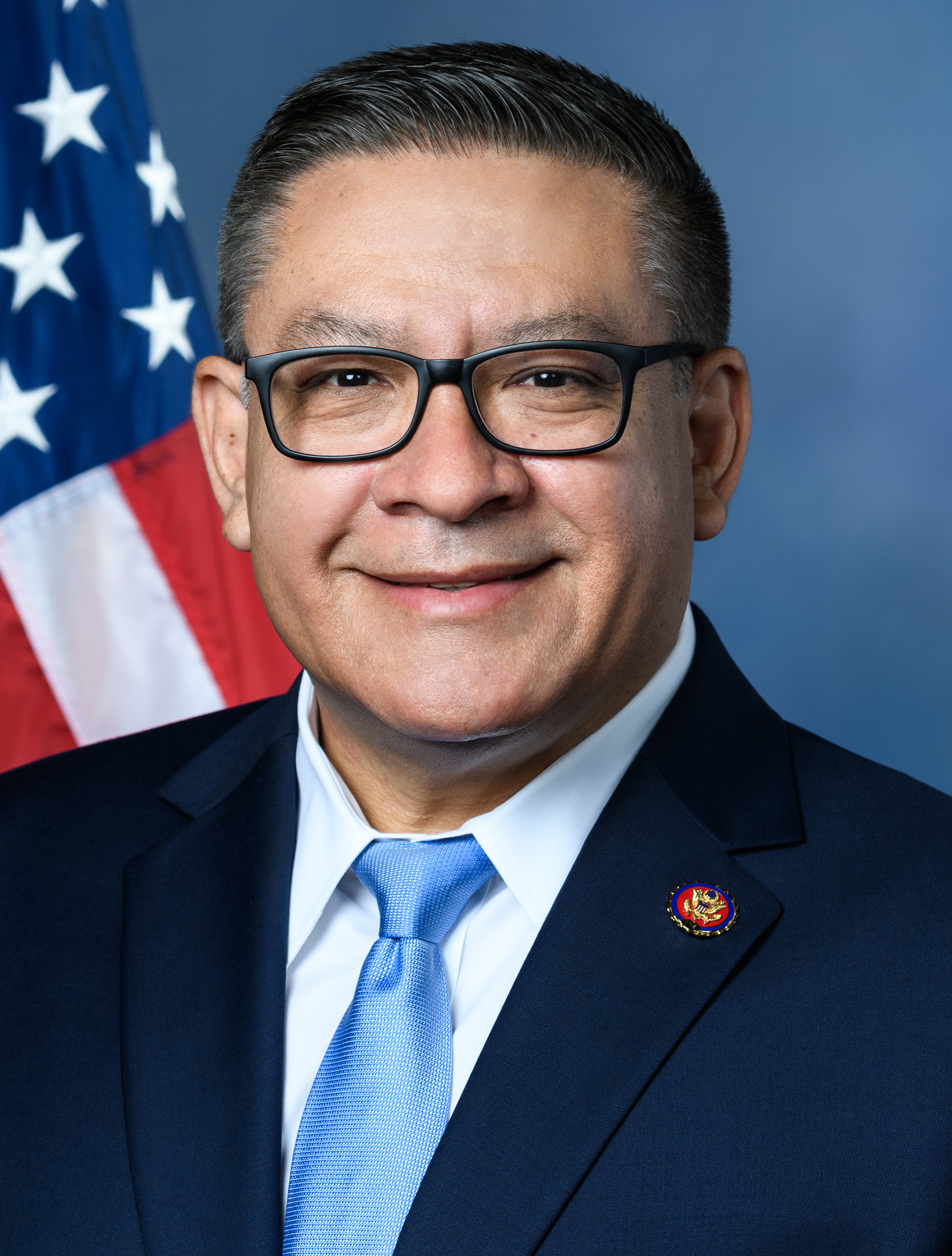

Candidate	Salud Carbajal	Andy Caldwell
Party	Democratic	Republican
Popular vote	212,564	149,781
Percentage	58.7%	41.3%
- County results Carbajal: 50–60% 60–70%
U.S. Representative before election
Salud Carbajal
Democratic
Elected U.S. Representative
Salud Carbajal
Democratic

The 24th district is based in the Central Coast and includes San Luis Obispo and Santa Barbara counties. The incumbent was Democrat Salud Carbajal, who was re-elected with 58.6% of the vote in 2018.

=== Candidates ===
==== Advanced to general ====
- Andy Caldwell (Republican), nonprofit executive
- Salud Carbajal (Democratic), incumbent U.S. representative

==== Eliminated in primary ====
- Kenneth Young (no party preference), civil engineer

=== Endorsements ===
Andy Caldwell (R)

State legislators

- Sam Blakeslee, former state assemblyman
- Brooks Firestone, former state assemblyman
Salud Carbajal (D)

Labor unions

- California Labor Federation
- California Teachers Association
- National Education Association
- National Union of Healthcare Workers
- Service Employees International Union California
- United Farm Workers

Organizations

- Brady Campaign
- California League of Conservation Voters
- Coalition to Stop Gun Violence
- Equality California
- Human Rights Campaign
- Humane Society of the United States Legislative Fund
- J Street
- Planned Parenthood
- Sierra Club
- VoteVets

=== Predictions ===
Source	Ranking	As of
The Cook Political Report	Safe D	July 2, 2020
Inside Elections	Safe D	June 2, 2020
Sabato's Crystal Ball	Safe D	July 2, 2020
Politico	Safe D	October 11, 2020
Daily Kos	Safe D	June 3, 2020
RCP	Safe D	June 9, 2020
Niskanen	Safe D	June 7, 2020

=== Results ===
2020 California's 24th congressional district primary results by county Map legend: Carbajal—60–70%; Carbajal—50–60%

California's 24th congressional district, 2020
Primary election
Party	Candidate	Votes	%
Democratic	Salud Carbajal (incumbent)	139,973	57.8
Republican	Andy Caldwell	92,537	38.2
No party preference	Kenneth Young	9,650	4.0
Total votes		242,160	100.0
General election
Democratic	Salud Carbajal (incumbent)	212,564	58.7
Republican	Andy Caldwell	149,781	41.3
Total votes		362,345	100.0
Democratic hold			

== District 25 ==
2020 California's 25th congressional district election
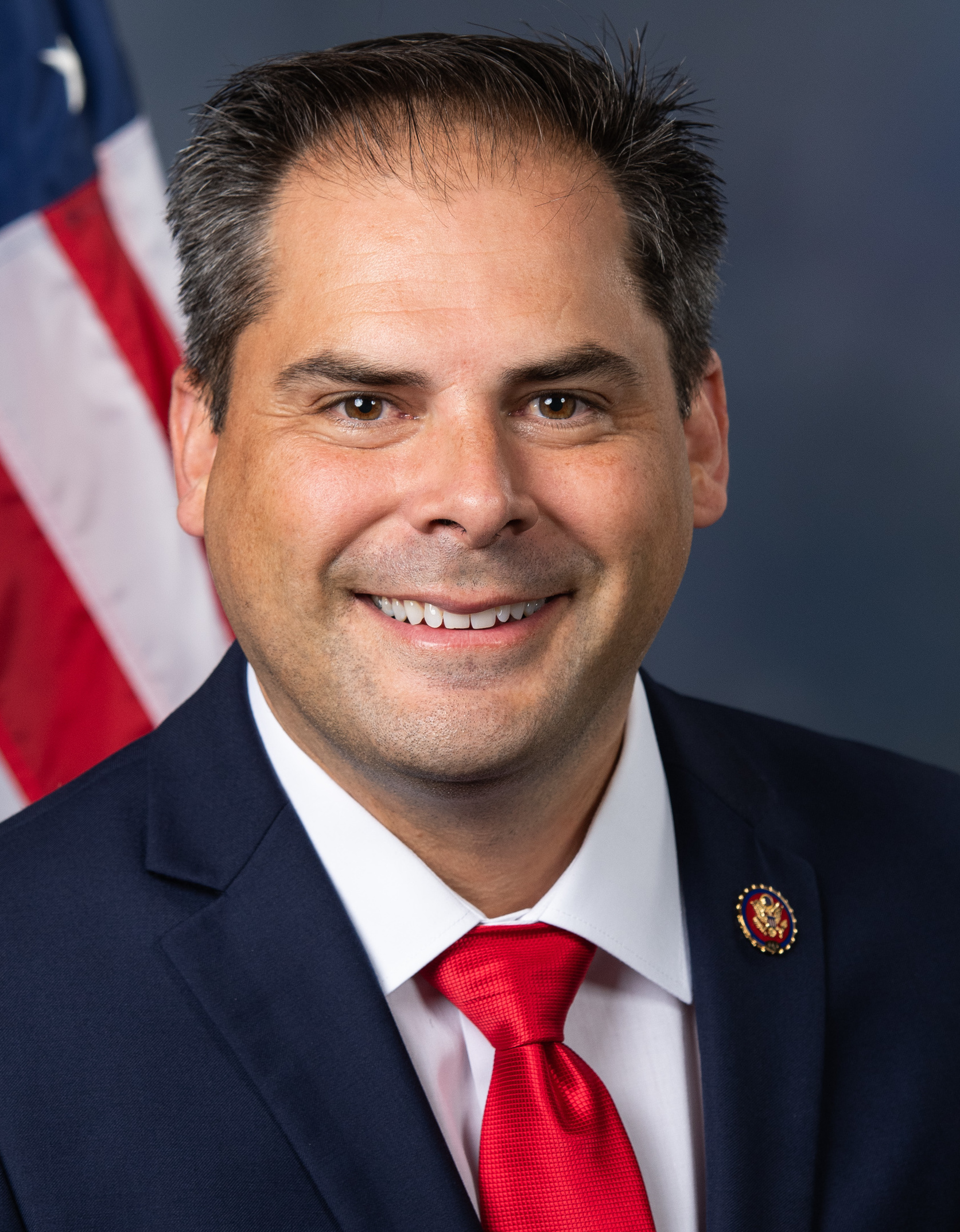

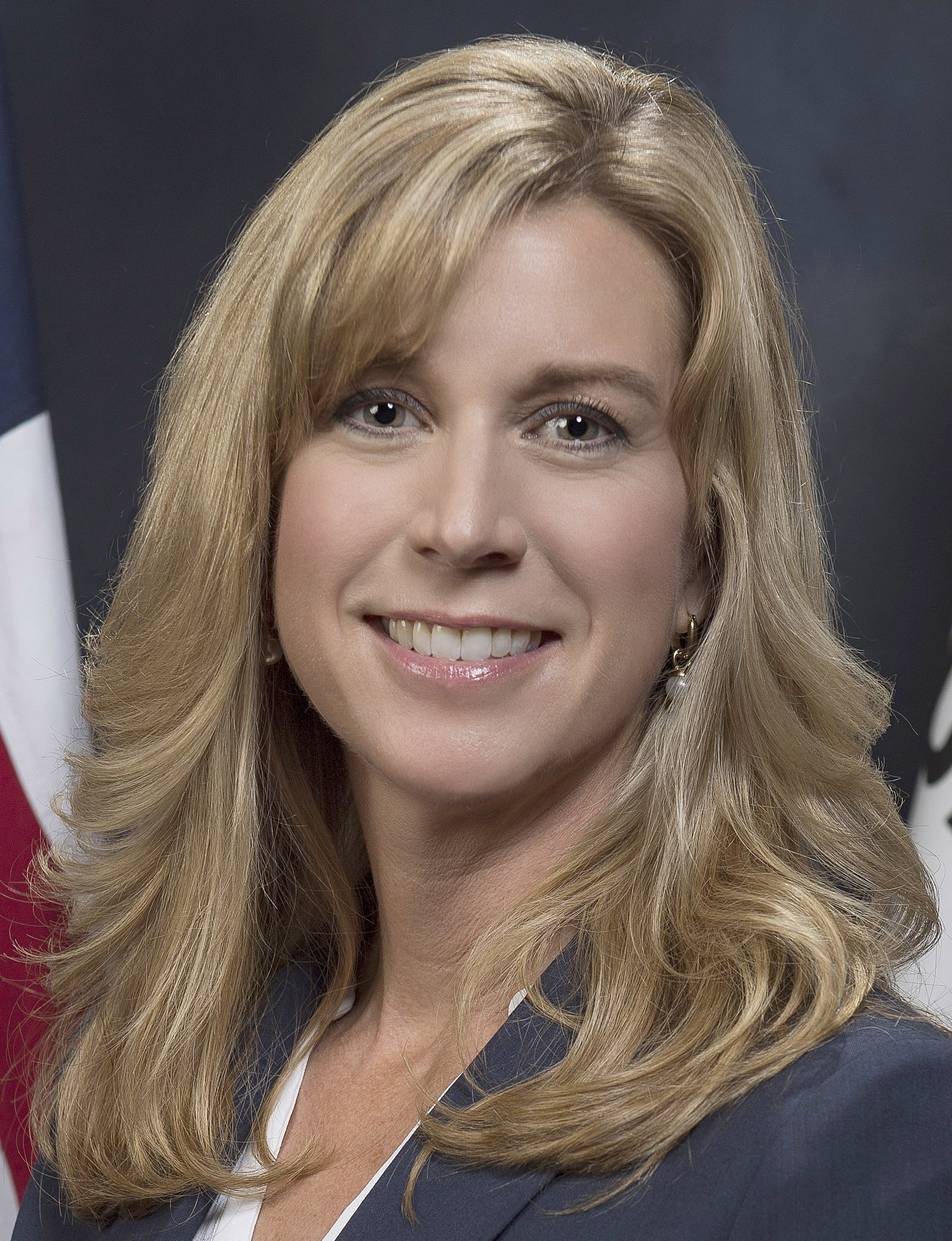
Candidate	Mike Garcia	Christy Smith
Party	Republican	Democratic
Popular vote	169,638	169,305
Percentage	50.05%	49.95%
- County results Garcia: 50–60% Smith: 50–60%
U.S. Representative before election
Mike Garcia
Republican
Elected U.S. Representative
Mike Garcia
Republican

The 25th district is based in northern Los Angeles County and eastern Ventura County, and includes the cities of Santa Clarita, Simi Valley, Palmdale, and eastern Lancaster. The seat was vacant from November 3, 2019, to May 19, 2020. Democrat Katie Hill resigned after she was alleged to have had inappropriate relations with one of her congressional staffers. Hill had flipped the district in 2018 and was elected with 54.4% of the vote. A special election to fill Hill's vacancy was held before the general election in 2020. Republican Mike Garcia won the special election with 54.9% of the vote, and was seated on May 19, 2020.

=== Candidates ===
==== Advanced to general ====
- Mike Garcia (Republican), incumbent U.S. representative
- Christy Smith (Democratic), state assemblywoman

==== Eliminated in primary ====
- Otis Lee Cooper (no party preference), legal defense investigator
- Robert Cooper III (Democratic), college professor
- Getro Franck Elize (Democratic), patient resource worker
- Kenneth Jenks (Republican), U.S. Marine Corps veteran and telecommunications executive
- Steve Knight (Republican), former U.S. representative
- David Lozano (Republican), attorney
- Daniel Mercuri (Republican), businessman
- George Papadopoulos (Republican), foreign policy adviser for Donald Trump's 2016 presidential campaign
- Cenk Uygur (Democratic), journalist and CEO and host of The Young Turks
- Aníbal Valdéz-Ortega (Democratic), attorney and community organizer

==== Withdrawn ====
- Mark Cripe (Republican), Los Angeles County deputy sheriff
- Christopher C. Smith (Democratic), documentary filmmaker
- Angela Underwood-Jacobs (Republican), Lancaster city councilwoman
- Suzette Valladares (Republican), businesswoman

=== Predictions ===
Source	Ranking	As of
The Cook Political Report	Tossup	July 2, 2020
Inside Elections	Tossup	September 18, 2020
Sabato's Crystal Ball	Lean R	September 2, 2020
Politico	Tossup	April 19, 2020
Daily Kos	Tossup	June 3, 2020
RCP	Tossup	June 9, 2020
Niskanen	Likely D (flip)	June 7, 2020

=== Polling ===
==== Primary election ====
Poll source	Date(s) administered	Sample size	Margin of error	Mike Garcia (R)	Steve Knight (R)	George Papadopoulos (R)	Christy Smith (D)	Cenk Uygur (D)
Tulchin Research (D) (Note: Poll sponsored by the Democratic Congressional Campaign Committee)	December 12–19, 2019	– (V) (Note: Not yet released)	–	13%	26%	3%	30%	5%

==== General election ====
Poll source	Date(s) administered	Sample size	Margin of error	Mike Garcia (R)	Christy Smith (D)	Undecided
Breakthrough Campaigns (D) (Note: Poll conducted for the Smith campaign.)	October 3–6, 2020	644 (LV)	± 3.9%	47%	49%	–
Normington, Petts & Associates (D) (Note: Poll sponsored by the House Majority PAC.)	September 21–23, 2020	400 (LV)	± 4.9%	45%	51%	4%
Global Strategy Group (D)	August 26–30, 2020	400 (LV)	± 4.9%	46%	45%	9%
American Viewpoint (R) (Note: Poll sponsored by the Congressional Leadership Fund, a pro-congressional Republican Super PAC)	July 26–28, 2020	400 (LV)	± 4.9%	48%	41%	8%
DCCC Targeting and Analytics Department (D)	May 6–10, 2020	675 (LV)	–	46%	48%	–

Hypothetical polling

Generic Republican v.s. Generic Democrat

Poll source	Date(s) administered	Sample size	Margin of error	Generic Republican	Generic Democrat
American Viewpoint (R)	July 26–28, 2020	400 (LV)	± 4.9%	38%	47%

=== Results ===
2020 California's 25th congressional district primary results by county Map legend: Smith—30–40%

California's 25th congressional district, 2020
Primary election
Party	Candidate	Votes	%
Democratic	Christy Smith	49,679	31.7
Republican	Mike Garcia	37,381	23.9
Republican	Steve Knight	29,645	18.9
Democratic	Cenk Uygur	9,246	5.9
Democratic	Getro Franck Elize	6,317	4.0
Republican	David Lozano	6,272	4.0
Democratic	Anibal Valdéz-Ortega	4,920	3.1
Democratic	Robert Cooper III	4,474	2.9
Republican	George Papadopoulos	2,749	1.8
No party preference	Otis Lee Cooper	2,183	1.4
Democratic	Christopher C. Smith (withdrawn)	2,089	1.3
Republican	Daniel Mercuri	913	0.6
Republican	Kenneth Jenks	682	0.4
Total votes		156,550	100.0
General election
Republican	Mike Garcia (incumbent)	169,638	50.05
Democratic	Christy Smith	169,305	49.95
Total votes		338,943	100.0
Republican hold			

== District 26 ==
2020 California's 26th congressional district election
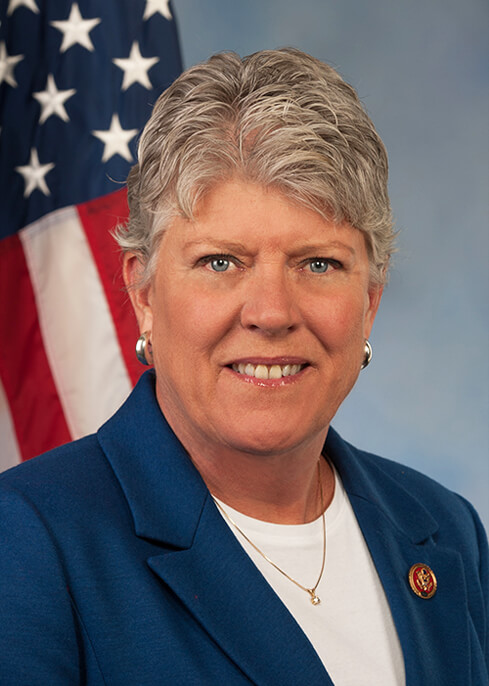

Candidate	Julia Brownley	Ronda Baldwin-Kennedy
Party	Democratic	Republican
Popular vote	208,856	135,877
Percentage	60.6%	39.4%
- County results Brownley: 50–60% 60–70%
U.S. Representative before election
Julia Brownley
Democratic
Elected U.S. Representative
Julia Brownley
Democratic

The 26th district is based in the southern Central Coast and is located entirely within Ventura County, taking in Camarillo, Oxnard, Ventura, Santa Paula, Thousand Oaks, Westlake Village, Moorpark, and parts of Simi Valley. The incumbent was Democrat Julia Brownley, who was re-elected with 61.9% of the vote in 2018.

=== Candidates ===
==== Advanced to general ====
- Ronda Baldwin-Kennedy (Republican), attorney and candidate for California State Assembly in 2018
- Julia Brownley (Democratic), incumbent U.S. representative

==== Eliminated in primary ====
- Enrique Petris (Democratic), contract administrator
- Robert Salas (Democratic), retired teacher

=== Endorsements ===
Julia Brownley (D)

Organizations

- California League of Conservation Voters
- Human Rights Campaign
- Sierra Club

=== Predictions ===
Source	Ranking	As of
The Cook Political Report	Safe D	July 2, 2020
Inside Elections	Safe D	June 2, 2020
Sabato's Crystal Ball	Safe D	July 2, 2020
Politico	Safe D	April 19, 2020
Daily Kos	Safe D	June 3, 2020
RCP	Safe D	June 9, 2020
Niskanen	Safe D	June 7, 2020

=== Results ===
2020 California's 26th congressional district primary results by county Map legend: Brownley—50–60%

California's 26th congressional district, 2020
Primary election
Party	Candidate	Votes	%
Democratic	Julia Brownley (incumbent)	106,141	55.8
Republican	Ronda Baldwin-Kennedy	67,579	35.6
Democratic	Robert L. Salas	12,717	6.7
Democratic	Enrique Petris	3,624	1.9
Total votes		190,061	100.0
General election
Democratic	Julia Brownley (incumbent)	208,856	60.6
Republican	Ronda Baldwin-Kennedy	135,877	39.4
Total votes		344,733	100.0

== District 27 ==
2020 California's 27th congressional district election
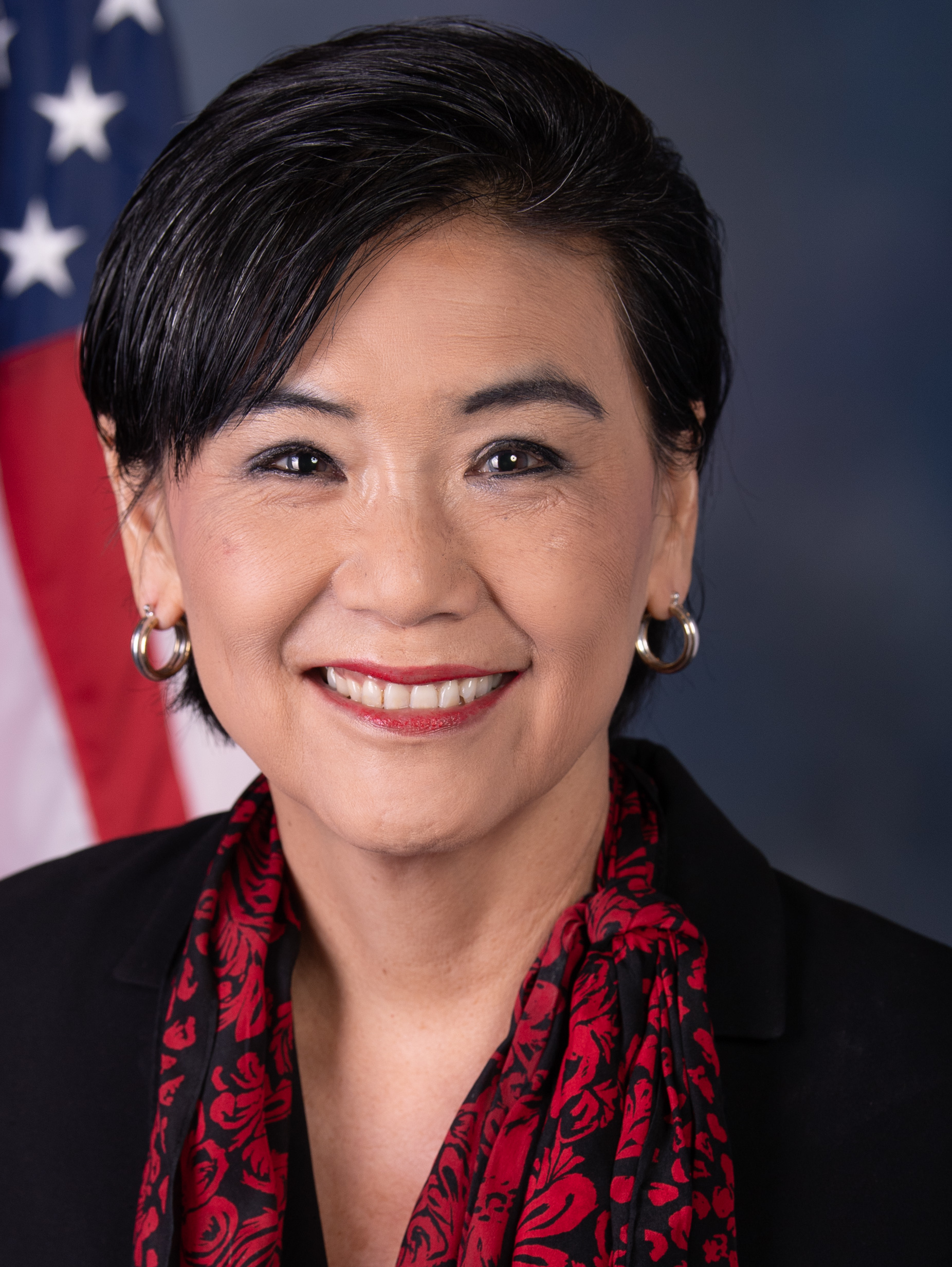

Candidate	Judy Chu	Johnny J. Nalbandian
Party	Democratic	Republican
Popular vote	221,411	95,907
Percentage	69.8%	30.2%
- County results Chu: 70–80% Nalbandian: 50–60%
U.S. Representative before election
Judy Chu
Democratic
Elected U.S. Representative
Judy Chu
Democratic

The 27 district encompasses the San Gabriel Valley, including Alhambra, Altadena, Arcadia, Bradbury, Claremont, East Pasadena, Glendora, Monrovia, Monterey Park, Pasadena, Rosemead, San Antonio Heights, San Gabriel, San Marino, Sierra Madre, South Pasadena, South San Gabriel, Temple City, and Upland. The incumbent was Democrat Judy Chu, who was re-elected with 79.2% of the vote in 2018.

=== Candidates ===
==== Advanced to general ====
- Judy Chu (Democratic), incumbent U.S. representative
- Johnny J. Nalbandian (Republican), entrepreneur and candidate for California's 28th congressional district in 2018

==== Eliminated in primary ====
- Beatrice Cardenas (Republican), loan officer
- Christian Daly (no party preference), former Duarte city manager intern

=== Predictions ===
Source	Ranking	As of
The Cook Political Report	Safe D	July 2, 2020
Inside Elections	Safe D	June 2, 2020
Sabato's Crystal Ball	Safe D	July 2, 2020
Politico	Safe D	April 19, 2020
Daily Kos	Safe D	June 3, 2020
RCP	Safe D	June 9, 2020
Niskanen	Safe D	June 7, 2020

=== Results ===
2020 California's 27th congressional district primary results by county Map legend: Chu—70–80%; Chu—40–50%

California's 27th congressional district, 2020
Primary election
Party	Candidate	Votes	%
Democratic	Judy Chu (incumbent)	117,724	70.9
Republican	Johnny J. Nalbandian	22,300	13.4
Republican	Beatrice Cardenas	19,449	11.7
No party preference	Christian Daly	6,504	3.9
Total votes		165,977	100.0
General election
Democratic	Judy Chu (incumbent)	221,411	69.8
Republican	Johnny J. Nalbandian	95,907	30.2
Total votes		317,318	100.0
Democratic hold			

== District 28 ==
2020 California's 28th congressional district election
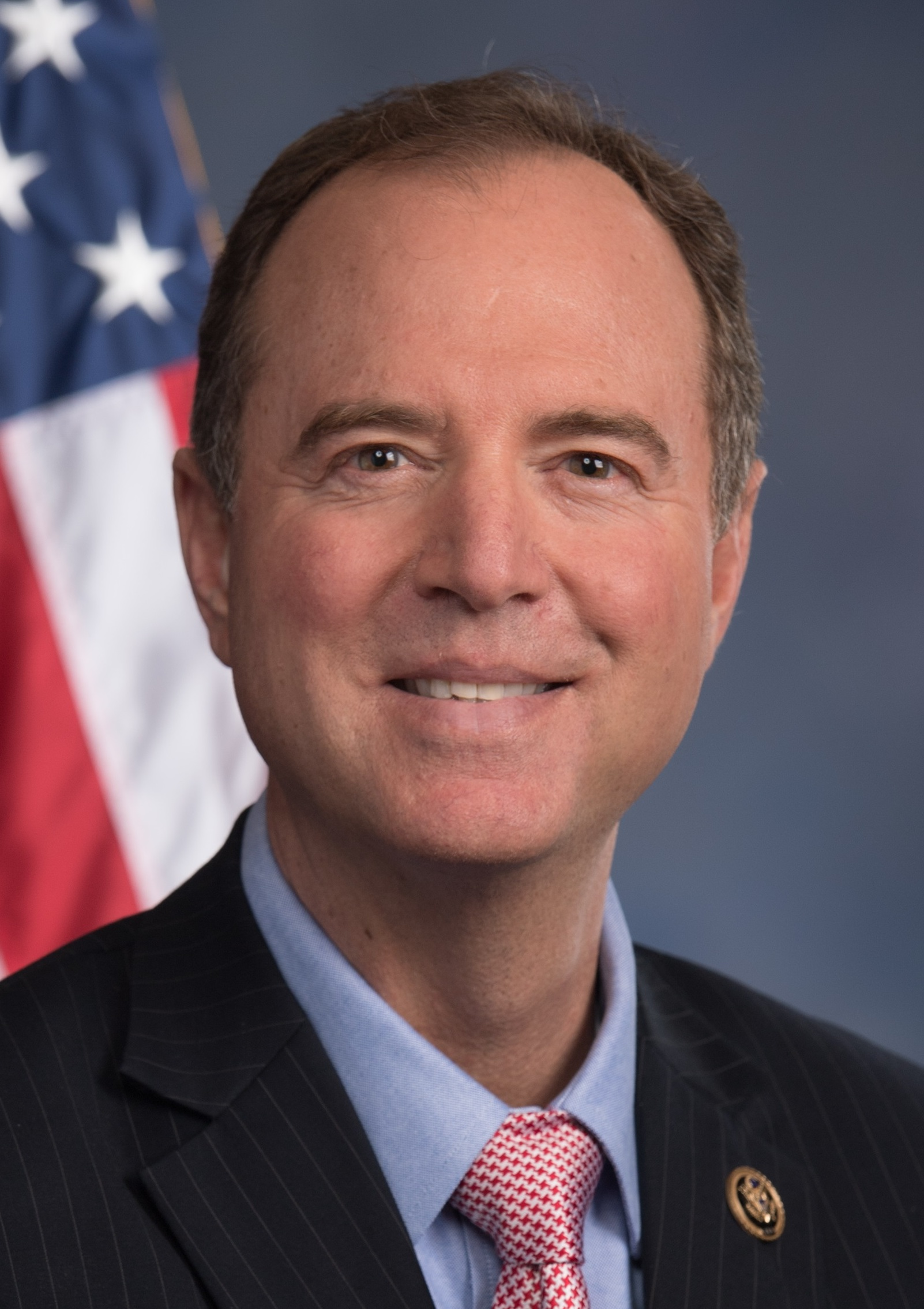

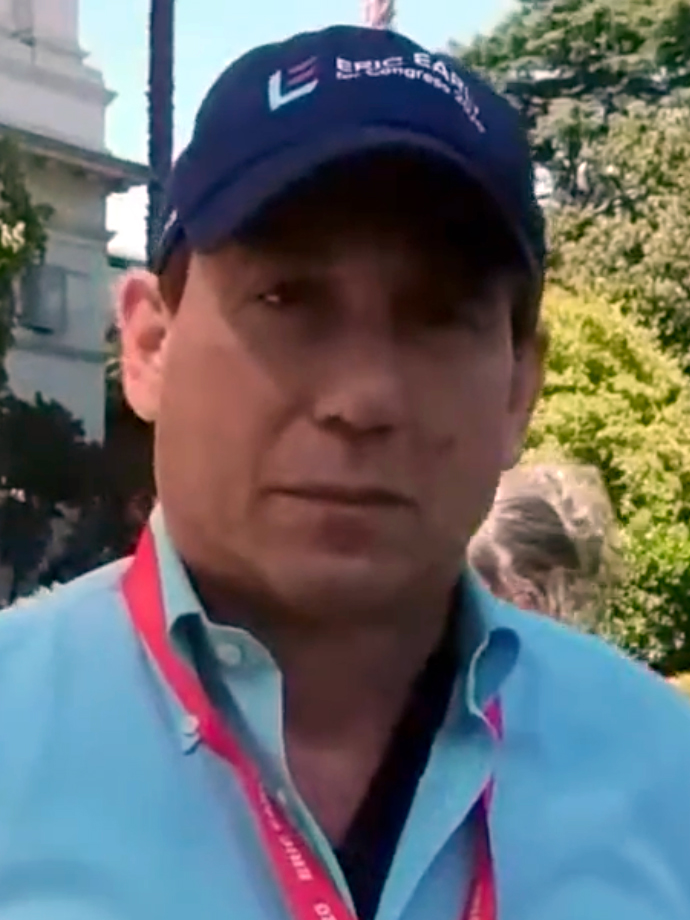
Candidate	Adam Schiff	Eric Early
Party	Democratic	Republican
Popular vote	244,471	91,928
Percentage	72.7%	27.3%
- County results Schiff: 70–80%
U.S. Representative before election
Adam Schiff
Democratic
Elected U.S. Representative
Adam Schiff
Democratic

The 28th district is based in the San Fernando Valley and includes West Hollywood, Burbank, parts of Pasadena, Glendale, the Verdugo Hills communities of Sunland and Tujunga, as well as parts of central Los Angeles including Hollywood, the Hollywood Hills, Echo Park, Silver Lake, and Los Feliz. The incumbent was Democrat Adam Schiff, who was re-elected with 78.4% of the vote in 2018.

=== Candidates ===
==== Advanced to general ====
- Eric Early (Republican), attorney and candidate for Attorney General of California in 2018
- Adam Schiff (Democratic), incumbent U.S. representative

==== Eliminated in primary ====
- Chad D. Anderson (Democratic), entrepreneur
- Jennifer Barbosa (no party preference), realtor and activist
- William Bodell (Republican), businessman
- Sal Genovese (Democratic), community services director
- Maebe A. Girl (Democratic), Silver Lake neighborhood councilwoman and drag queen
- Ara Khachig Manoogian (Democratic), security systems integrator

=== Endorsements ===
Adam Schiff (D)

Individuals

- David Slack, writer and activist

Organizations

- California League of Conservation Voters
- California Teachers Association
- Human Rights Campaign
- Planned Parenthood Action Fund
- Sierra Club
Maebe A. Girl (D)

Individuals

- Willam Belli, drag queen
- Grimes, musician
- HANA, musician
- Sarah Silverman, comedian and actress

Organizations

- Ground Game LA
- Our Revolution Los Angeles

=== Predictions ===
Source	Ranking	As of
The Cook Political Report	Safe D	July 2, 2020
Inside Elections	Safe D	June 2, 2020
Sabato's Crystal Ball	Safe D	July 2, 2020
Politico	Safe D	April 19, 2020
Daily Kos	Safe D	June 3, 2020
RCP	Safe D	June 9, 2020
Niskanen	Safe D	June 7, 2020

=== Results ===
California's 28th congressional district, 2020
Primary election
Party	Candidate	Votes	%
Democratic	Adam Schiff (incumbent)	110,251	59.6
Republican	Eric Early	23,243	12.6
Democratic	Maebe A. Girl	22,129	12.0
No party preference	Jennifer Barbosa	10,421	5.6
Republican	William Bodell	7,093	3.8
Democratic	Sal Genovese	6,294	3.4
Democratic	Ara Khachig Manoogian	3,290	1.9
Democratic	Chad D. Anderson	2,359	1.3
Total votes		185,080	100.0
General election
Democratic	Adam Schiff (incumbent)	244,271	72.7
Republican	Eric Early	91,928	27.3
Total votes		336,199	100.0
Democratic hold			

== District 29 ==
2020 California's 29th congressional district election
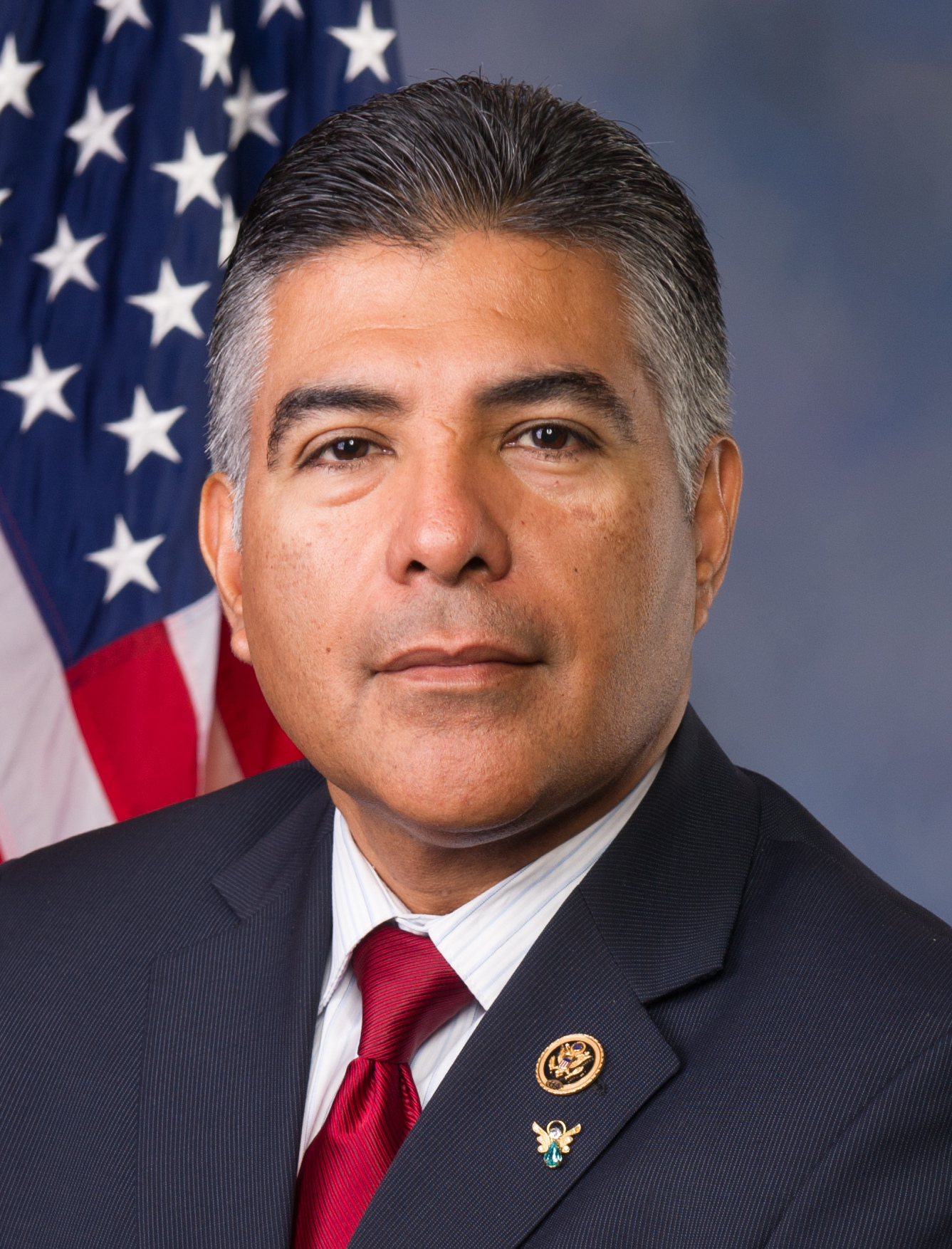

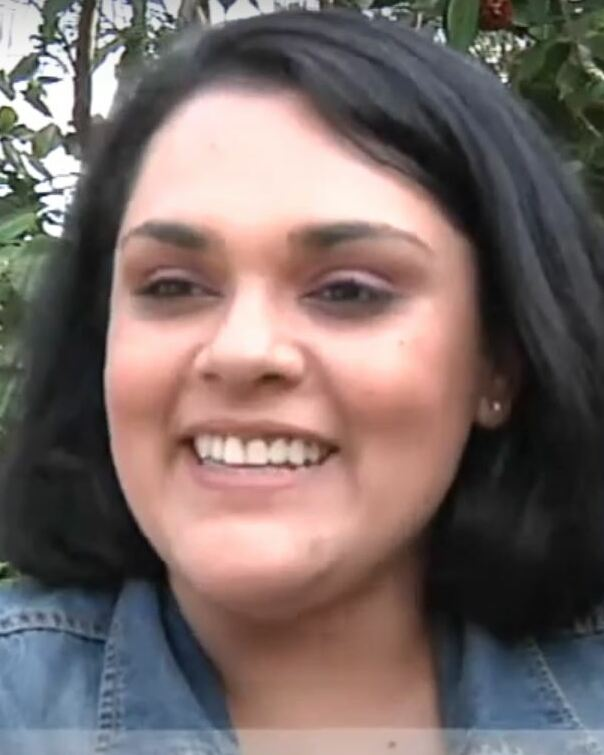
Candidate	Tony Cárdenas	Angélica Dueñas
Party	Democratic	Democratic
Popular vote	119,420	91,524
Percentage	56.6%	43.4%
U.S. Representative before election
Tony Cárdenas
Democratic
Elected U.S. Representative
Tony Cárdenas
Democratic

The 29th district is based in the eastern San Fernando Valley, taking in the city of San Fernando as well as the Los Angeles communities of Van Nuys, Pacoima, Arleta, Panorama City, Sylmar and parts of Sun Valley and North Hollywood. The incumbent was Democrat Tony Cárdenas, who was re-elected with 80.6% of the vote in 2018.

=== Candidates ===
==== Advanced to general ====
- Tony Cárdenas (Democratic), incumbent U.S. representative
- Angélica Dueñas (Democratic), member of the Sun Valley neighborhood council

==== Eliminated in primary ====
- Michael R. Guzik (Democratic), ride-share driver
- Brian Perras (Republican), U.S. Navy veteran

=== Endorsements ===
Tony Cárdenas (D)

Labor unions

- California Labor Federation
- California Teachers Association
- National Union of Healthcare Workers
- Service Employees International Union California
- United Farm Workers

Organizations

- California League of Conservation Voters
- Equality California
- Human Rights Campaign
- Humane Society of the United States Legislative Fund
- Planned Parenthood Action Fund
- Sierra Club
Angélica Dueñas (D)

Individuals

- Marianne Williamson, author, spiritual leader, and activist; candidate for president in 2020; Independent candidate for U.S. representative from CA-33 in 2014

Labor unions

- American Federation of Musicians – Local 47

Organizations

- Americans for Democratic Action
- Our Revolution – Los Angeles
- Our Revolution – Santa Clarita
- Progressive Democrats of America
- Sunrise Movement – Los Angeles

=== Predictions ===
Source	Ranking	As of
The Cook Political Report	Safe D	July 2, 2020
Inside Elections	Safe D	June 2, 2020
Sabato's Crystal Ball	Safe D	July 2, 2020
Politico	Safe D	April 19, 2020
Daily Kos	Safe D	June 3, 2020
RCP	Safe D	June 9, 2020
Niskanen	Safe D	June 7, 2020

=== Results ===
California's 29th congressional district, 2020
Primary election
Party	Candidate	Votes	%
Democratic	Tony Cárdenas (incumbent)	56,984	58.5
Democratic	Angélica Dueñas	22,423	23.0
Republican	Brian Perras	14,571	15.0
Democratic	Michael R. Guzik	3,373	3.5
Total votes		97,351	100.0
General election
Democratic	Tony Cárdenas (incumbent)	119,420	56.6
Democratic	Angélica Dueñas	91,524	43.4
Total votes		210,944	100.0
Democratic hold			

== District 30 ==
2020 California's 30th congressional district election
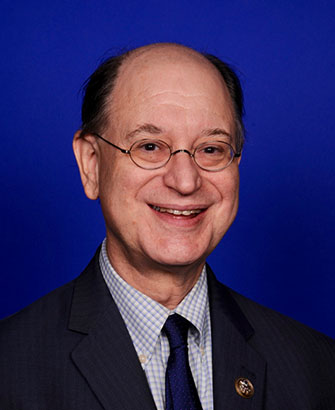

Candidate	Brad Sherman	Mark S. Reed
Party	Democratic	Republican
Popular vote	240,038	105,426
Percentage	69.5%	30.5%
- County results Sherman: 50–60% 60–70%
U.S. Representative before election
Brad Sherman
Democratic
Elected U.S. Representative
Brad Sherman
Democratic

The 30th district is based in the western San Fernando Valley, including the Los Angeles neighborhoods of Canoga Park, Chatsworth, Encino, Granada Hills, Northridge, Porter Ranch, Reseda, Sherman Oaks, Studio City, Tarzana, Toluca Lake, West Hills, Winnetka, and Woodland Hills, as well as Calabasas, Bell Canyon, and Hidden Hills. The incumbent was Democrat Brad Sherman, who was re-elected with 73.4% of the vote in 2018.

=== Candidates ===
==== Advanced to general ====
- Mark S. Reed (Republican), businessman and perennial candidate
- Brad Sherman (Democratic), incumbent U.S. Representative

==== Eliminated in primary ====
- Courtney "CJ" Berina (Democratic), marketing consultant
- Brian T. Carroll (Democratic)
- Raji Rab (Democratic), commercial pilot and candidate for California's 30th congressional district in 2018

=== Predictions ===
Source	Ranking	As of
The Cook Political Report	Safe D	July 2, 2020
Inside Elections	Safe D	June 2, 2020
Sabato's Crystal Ball	Safe D	July 2, 2020
Politico	Safe D	April 19, 2020
Daily Kos	Safe D	June 3, 2020
RCP	Safe D	June 9, 2020
Niskanen	Safe D	June 7, 2020

=== Results ===
2020 California's 30th congressional district primary results by county Map legend: Sherman—50–60%; Sherman—40–50%

California's 30th congressional district, 2020
Primary election
Party	Candidate	Votes	%
Democratic	Brad Sherman (incumbent)	99,282	58.1
Republican	Mark S. Reed	38,778	22.7
Democratic	Courtney "CJ" Berina	18,937	11.1
Democratic	Raji Rab	7,961	4.7
Democratic	Brian T. Carroll	5,984	3.5
Total votes		170,942	100.0
General election
Democratic	Brad Sherman (incumbent)	240,038	69.5
Republican	Mark S. Reed	105,426	30.5
Total votes		345,464	100.0
Democratic hold			

== District 31 ==
2020 California's 31st congressional district election
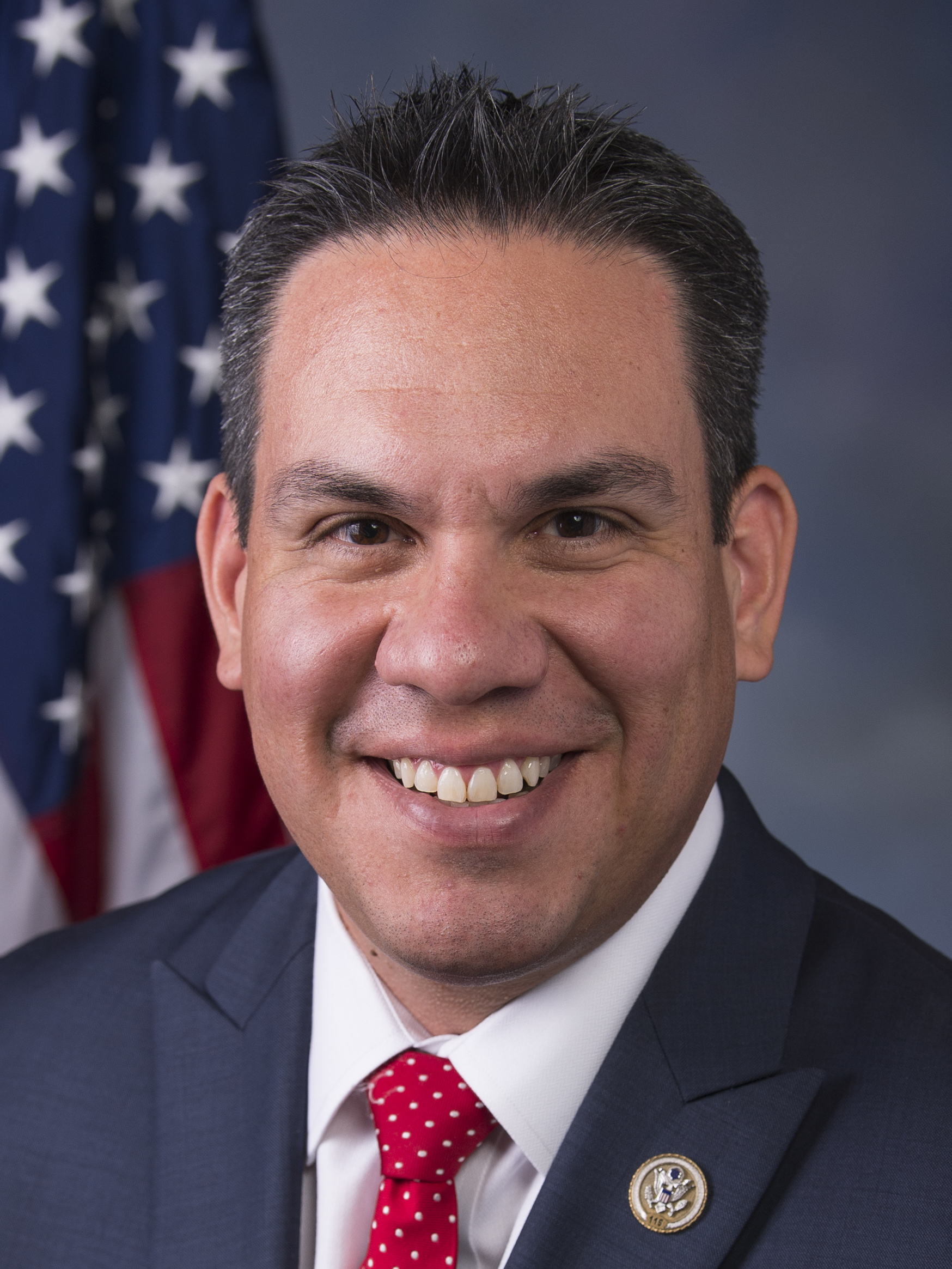

Candidate	Pete Aguilar	Agnes Gibboney
Party	Democratic	Republican
Popular vote	175,315	110,735
Percentage	61.3%	38.7%
- County results Aguilar: 60–70%
U.S. Representative before election
Pete Aguilar
Democratic
Elected U.S. Representative
Pete Aguilar
Democratic

The 31st district encompasses parts of the Inland Empire, including San Bernardino, Rancho Cucamonga, Redlands, and parts of Rialto. The incumbent was Democrat Pete Aguilar, who was re-elected with 58.7% of the vote in 2018.

=== Candidates ===
==== Advanced to general ====
- Pete Aguilar (Democratic), incumbent U.S. representative
- Agnes Gibboney (Republican), activist and angel mom

=== Predictions ===
Source	Ranking	As of
The Cook Political Report	Safe D	July 2, 2020
Inside Elections	Safe D	June 2, 2020
Sabato's Crystal Ball	Safe D	July 2, 2020
Politico	Safe D	October 11, 2020
Daily Kos	Safe D	June 3, 2020
RCP	Safe D	June 9, 2020
Niskanen	Safe D	June 7, 2020

=== Results ===
California's 31st congressional district, 2020
Primary election
Party	Candidate	Votes	%
Democratic	Pete Aguilar (incumbent)	81,994	62.2
Republican	Agnes Gibboney	49,889	37.8
No party preference	Eugene Weems (write-in)	51	0.0
Total votes		131,934	100.0
General election
Democratic	Pete Aguilar (incumbent)	175,315	61.3
Republican	Agnes Gibboney	110,735	38.7
Total votes		286,050	100.0
Democratic hold			

== District 32 ==
2020 California's 32nd congressional district election
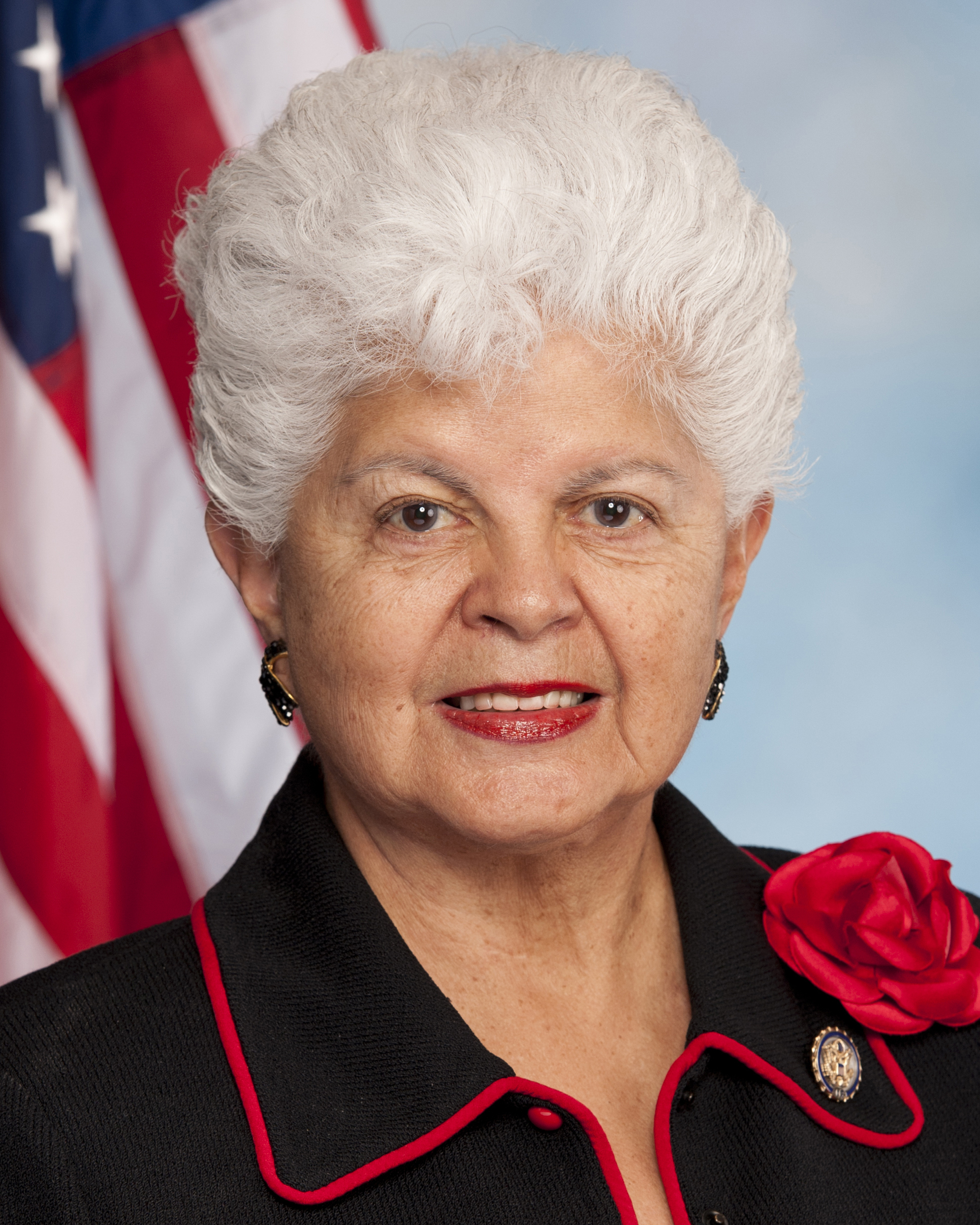

Candidate	Grace Napolitano	Joshua M. Scott
Party	Democratic	Republican
Popular vote	172,942	86,818
Percentage	66.6%	33.4%
- County results Napolitano: 60–70%
U.S. Representative before election
Grace Napolitano
Democratic
Elected U.S. Representative
Grace Napolitano
Democratic

The 32nd district takes in the eastern San Gabriel Valley, including Baldwin Park, El Monte, West Covina, San Dimas, Azusa, and southern Glendora. The incumbent was Democrat Grace Napolitano, who was re-elected with 68.8% of the vote in 2018.

=== Candidates ===
==== Advanced to general ====
- Grace Napolitano (Democratic), incumbent U.S. representative
- Joshua M. Scott (Republican), political strategist and candidate for California's 32nd congressional district in 2018

==== Eliminated in primary ====
- Emanuel Gonzales (Democratic), dialysis technician
- Meshal "Kash" Kashifalghita (Democratic), U.S. Army Reserve officer
- Raul Ali Madrigal (Democratic, write-in), USMC veteran

=== Predictions ===
Source	Ranking	As of
The Cook Political Report	Safe D	July 2, 2020
Inside Elections	Safe D	June 2, 2020
Sabato's Crystal Ball	Safe D	July 2, 2020
Politico	Safe D	April 19, 2020
Daily Kos	Safe D	June 3, 2020
RCP	Safe D	June 9, 2020
Niskanen	Safe D	June 7, 2020

=== Results ===
California's 32nd congressional district, 2020
Primary election
Party	Candidate	Votes	%
Democratic	Grace Napolitano (incumbent)	60,011	51.7
Republican	Joshua M. Scott	32,707	28.2
Democratic	Emanuel Gonzales	14,475	12.5
Democratic	Meshal "Kash" Kashifalghita	8,958	7.7
Total votes		116,151	100.0
General election
Democratic	Grace Napolitano (incumbent)	172,942	66.6
Republican	Joshua M. Scott	86,818	33.4
Total votes		259,760	100.0
Democratic hold			

== District 33 ==
2020 California's 33rd congressional district election
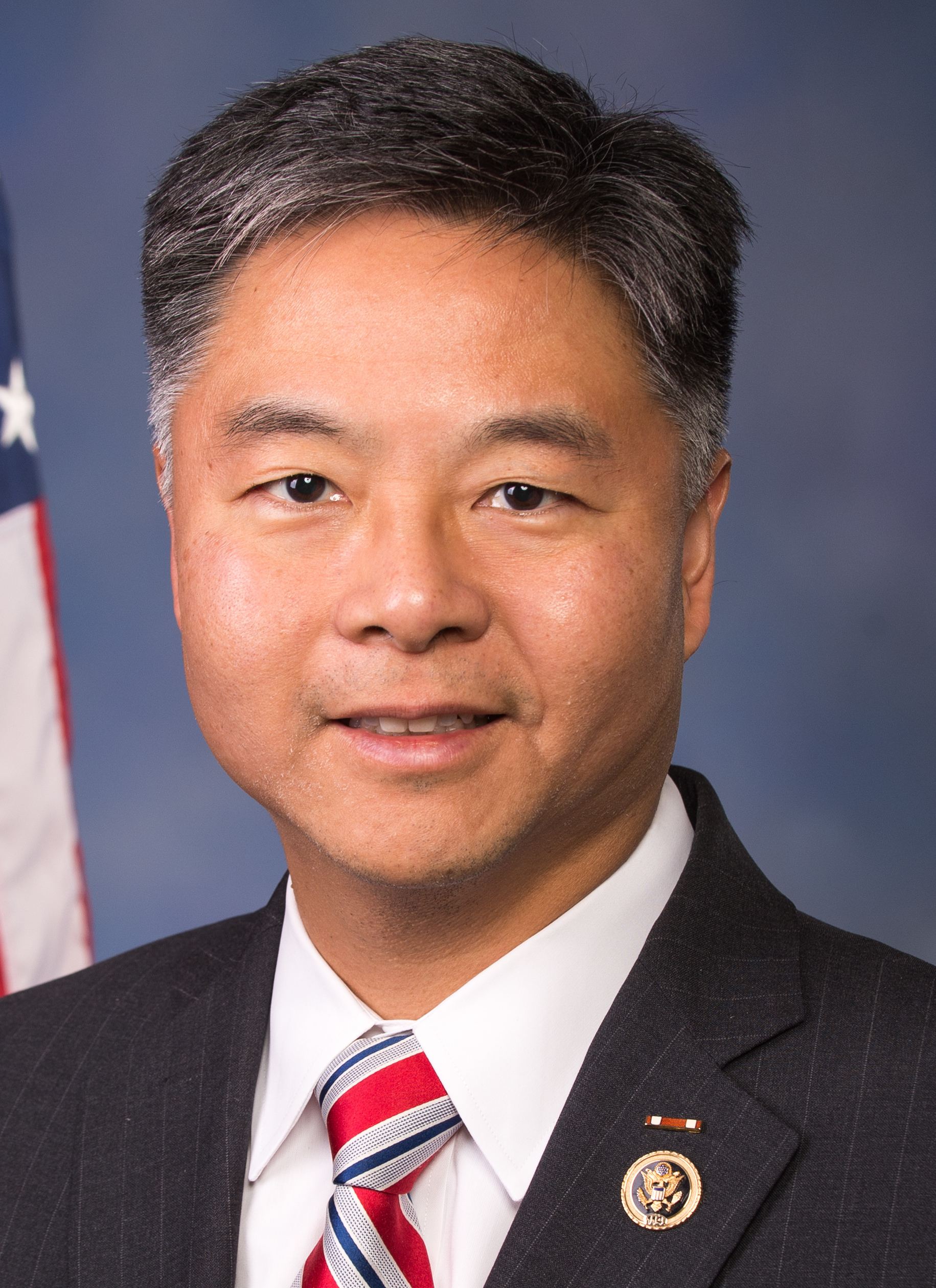

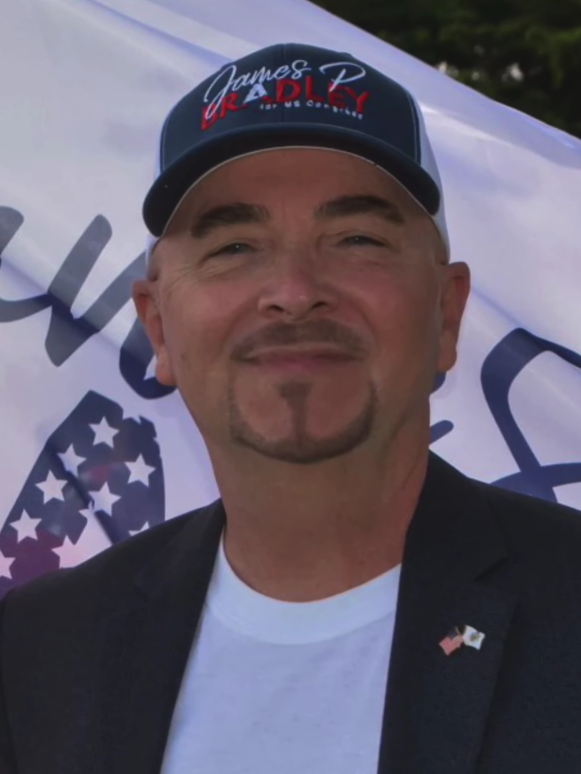
Candidate	Ted Lieu	James P. Bradley
Party	Democratic	Republican
Popular vote	257,094	123,334
Percentage	67.6%	32.4%
- County results Lieu: 60–70%
U.S. Representative before election
Ted Lieu
Democratic
Elected U.S. Representative
Ted Lieu
Democratic

The 33rd district spans the coastal region of Los Angeles County, including the Beach Cities, Westside Los Angeles, and the Palos Verdes Peninsula. The incumbent was Democrat Ted Lieu, who was re-elected with 70.0% of the vote in 2018.

=== Candidates ===
==== Advanced to general ====
- James P. Bradley (Republican), businessman and candidate for U.S. Senate in 2018
- Ted Lieu (Democratic), incumbent U.S. representative

==== Eliminated in primary ====
- Liz Barris (Democratic), nonprofit director
- Albert Maxwell Goldberg (Democratic), candidate for California's 26th congressional district in 2012
- Sarah Sun Liew (Republican), businesswoman
- Kenneth W. Wright (no party preference), ophthalmology surgeon

=== Endorsements ===
Ted Lieu (D)

Organizations

- California League of Conservation Voters
- California Teachers Association
- Human Rights Campaign
- Planned Parenthood Action Fund
- Sierra Club

=== Predictions ===
Source	Ranking	As of
The Cook Political Report	Safe D	July 2, 2020
Inside Elections	Safe D	June 2, 2020
Sabato's Crystal Ball	Safe D	July 2, 2020
Politico	Safe D	April 19, 2020
Daily Kos	Safe D	June 3, 2020
RCP	Safe D	June 9, 2020
Niskanen	Safe D	June 7, 2020

=== Results ===
California's 33rd congressional district, 2020
Primary election
Party	Candidate	Votes	%
Democratic	Ted Lieu (incumbent)	130,063	60.5
Republican	James P. Bradley	37,531	17.4
Democratic	Liz Barris	15,180	7.1
Republican	Sarah Sun Liew	13,601	6.3
No party preference	Kenneth W. Wright	9,673	4.5
Democratic	Albert Maxwell Goldberg	9,032	4.2
Total votes		215,080	100.0
General election
Democratic	Ted Lieu (incumbent)	257,094	67.6
Republican	James P. Bradley	123,334	32.4
Total votes		380,428	100.0
Democratic hold			

== District 34 ==
2020 California's 34th congressional district election
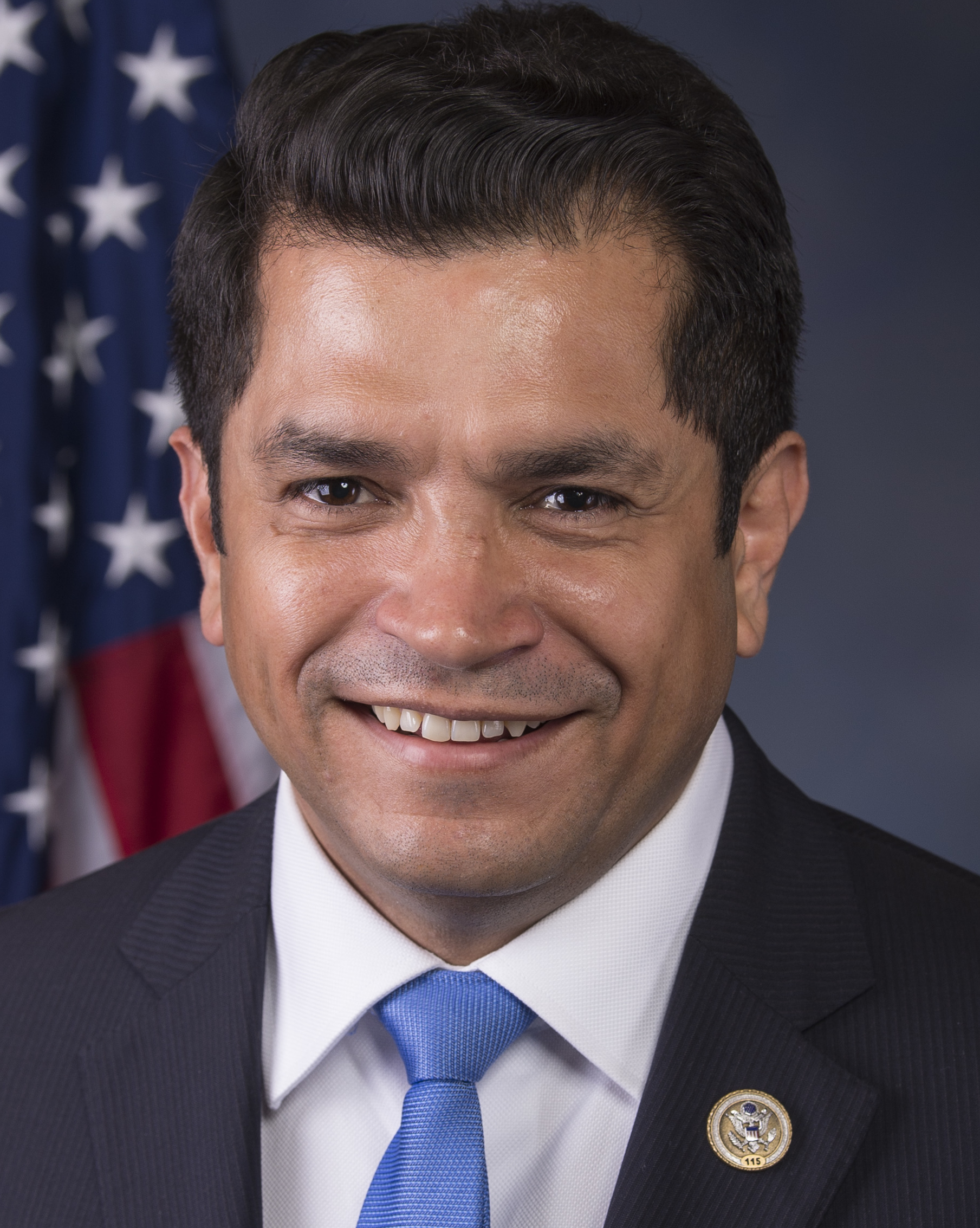

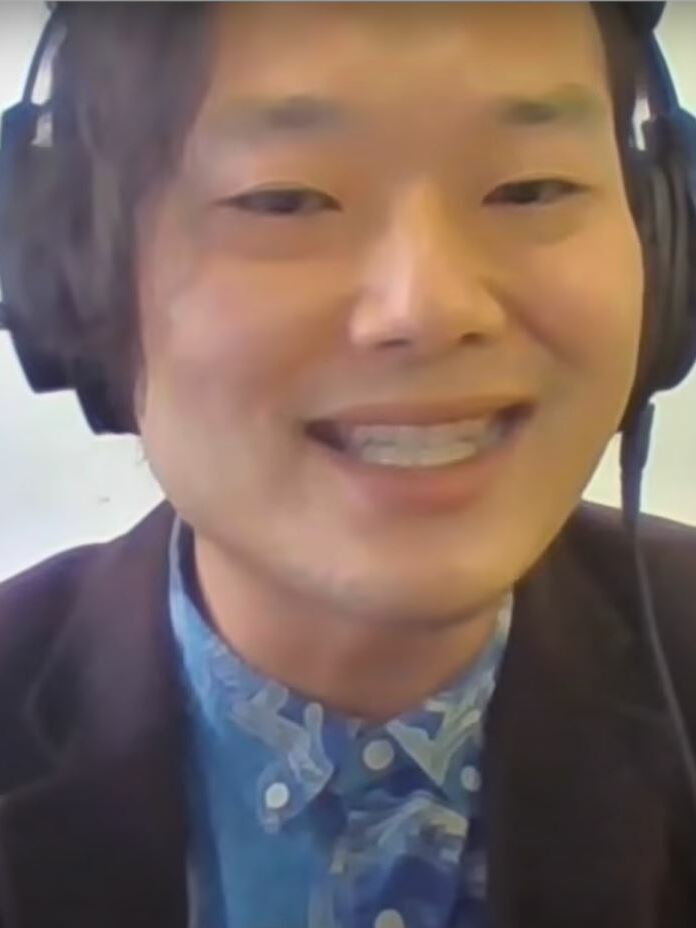
Candidate	Jimmy Gomez	David Kim
Party	Democratic	Democratic
Popular vote	108,792	96,554
Percentage	53.0%	47.0%
U.S. Representative before election
Jimmy Gomez
Democratic
Elected U.S. Representative
Jimmy Gomez
Democratic

The 34th district is located entirely in the city of Los Angeles and includes the Central, East, and Northeast neighborhoods, such as Chinatown, Downtown, Eagle Rock, and Koreatown. The incumbent was Democrat Jimmy Gomez, who was re-elected with 72.5% of the vote in 2018.

=== Candidates ===
==== Advanced to general ====
- Jimmy Gomez (Democratic), incumbent U.S. representative
- David Kim (Democratic), MacArthur Park neighborhood council board member

==== Eliminated in primary ====
- Frances Yasmeen Motiwalla (Democratic), activist (endorsed Kim)
- Keanakay Scott (Democratic), author
- Joanne L. Wright (Republican)

=== Endorsements ===
Jimmy Gomez (D)

Organizations

- California League of Conservation Voters
- Equality California
- Human Rights Campaign
- Humane Society of the United States Legislative Fund
- Planned Parenthood
- Progressive Action PAC (Congressional Progressive Caucus)
- Sierra Club

Unions

- California Labor Federation
- California Teachers Association
- Service Employees International Union California
David Kim (D)

Individuals

- Marianne Williamson, former 2020 Democratic presidential candidate, author and spiritual leader
- Andrew Yang, former 2020 Democratic presidential candidate and non-profit leader

Organizations

- Humanity Forward
- Our Revolution – Los Angeles chapter
- Sunrise Movement – Los Angeles chapter

=== Predictions ===
Source	Ranking	As of
The Cook Political Report	Safe D	July 2, 2020
Inside Elections	Safe D	June 2, 2020
Sabato's Crystal Ball	Safe D	July 2, 2020
Politico	Safe D	April 19, 2020
Daily Kos	Safe D	June 3, 2020
RCP	Safe D	June 9, 2020
Niskanen	Safe D	June 7, 2020

=== Results ===
2018 California's 34th congressional district primary results by county supervisorial district Map legend: Gomez—50–60%; Gomez—40–50%

California's 34th congressional district, 2020
Primary election
Party	Candidate	Votes	%
Democratic	Jimmy Gomez (incumbent)	57,066	52.0
Democratic	David Kim	23,055	21.0
Democratic	Frances Yasmeen Motiwalla	14,961	13.6
Republican	Joanne L. Wright	8,482	7.7
Democratic	Keanakay Scott	6,089	5.6
Total votes		109,653	100.0
General election
Democratic	Jimmy Gomez (incumbent)	108,792	53.0
Democratic	David Kim	96,554	47.0
Total votes		205,346	100.0
Democratic hold			

== District 35 ==
2020 California's 35th congressional district election
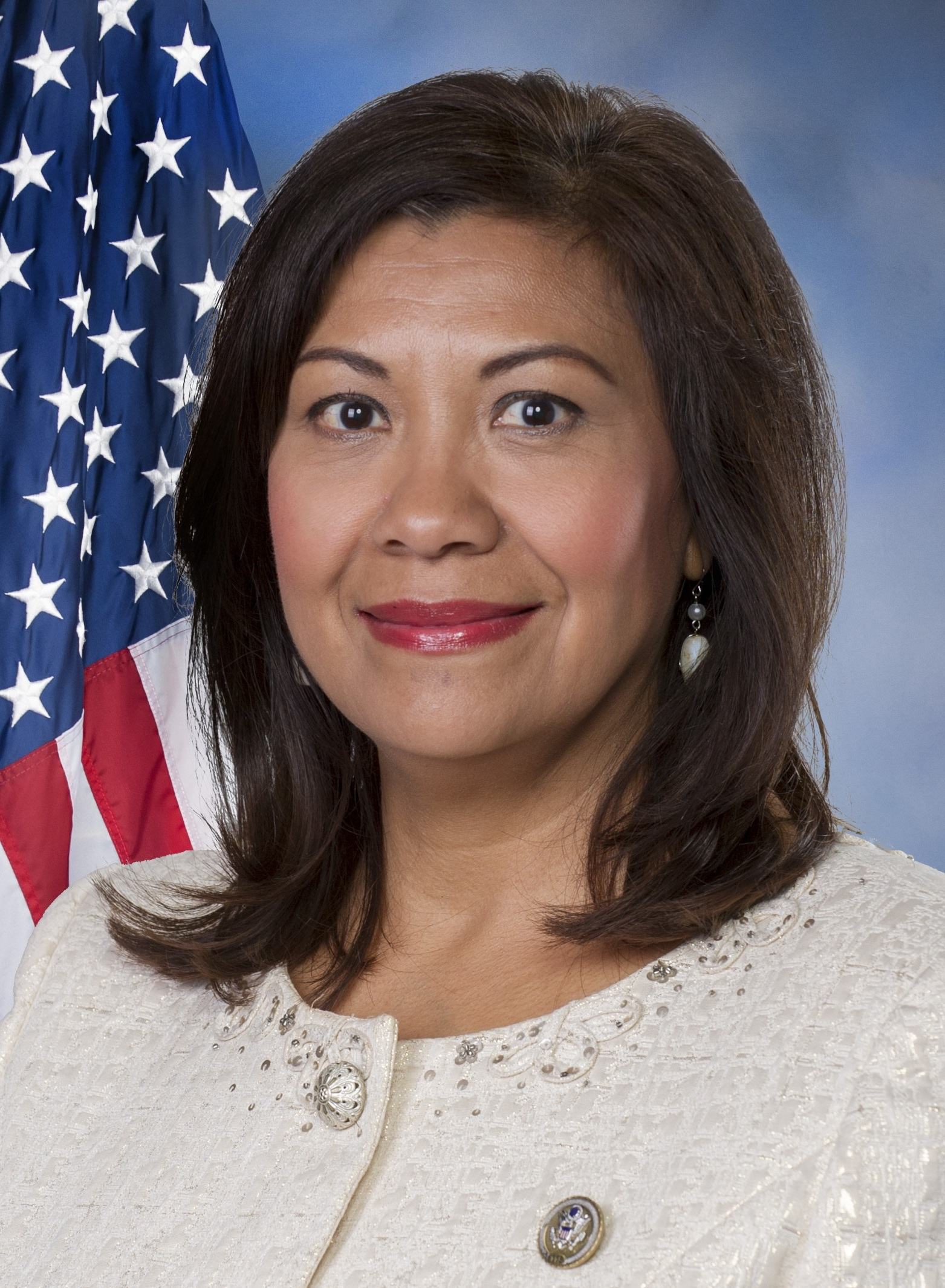

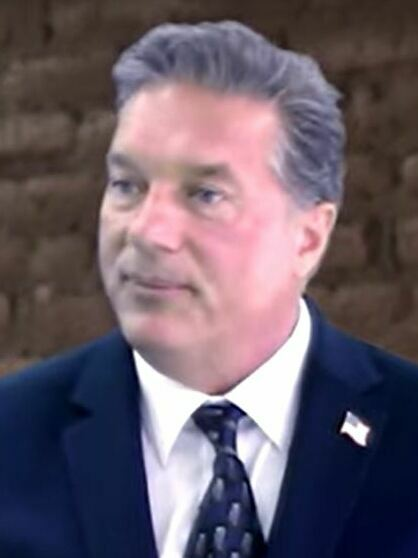
Candidate	Norma Torres	Mike Cargile
Party	Democratic	Republican
Popular vote	169,405	74,941
Percentage	69.3%	30.7%
- County results Torres: 60–70% 70–80%
U.S. Representative before election
Norma Torres
Democratic
Elected U.S. Representative
Norma Torres
Democratic

The 35th district takes in southwestern San Bernardino County, including Chino, Fontana, Montclair, Ontario, as well as Pomona. The incumbent was Democrat Norma Torres, who was re-elected with 69.4% of the vote in 2018.

=== Candidates ===
==== Advanced to general ====
- Mike Cargile (Republican), independent filmmaker
- Norma Torres (Democratic), incumbent U.S. representative

=== Predictions ===
Source	Ranking	As of
The Cook Political Report	Safe D	July 2, 2020
Inside Elections	Safe D	June 2, 2020
Sabato's Crystal Ball	Safe D	July 2, 2020
Politico	Safe D	April 19, 2020
Daily Kos	Safe D	June 3, 2020
RCP	Safe D	June 9, 2020
Niskanen	Safe D	June 7, 2020

=== Results ===
2020 2020 California's 35th congressional district primary results by county Map legend: Torres—70–80%; Torres—60–70%

California's 35th congressional district, 2020
Primary election
Party	Candidate	Votes	%
Democratic	Norma Torres (incumbent)	70,813	70.8
Republican	Mike Cargile	29,234	29.2
Total votes		100,047	100.0
General election
Democratic	Norma Torres (incumbent)	169,405	69.3
Republican	Mike Cargile	74,941	30.7
Total votes		244,346	100.0
Democratic hold			

== District 36 ==
2020 California's 36th congressional district election
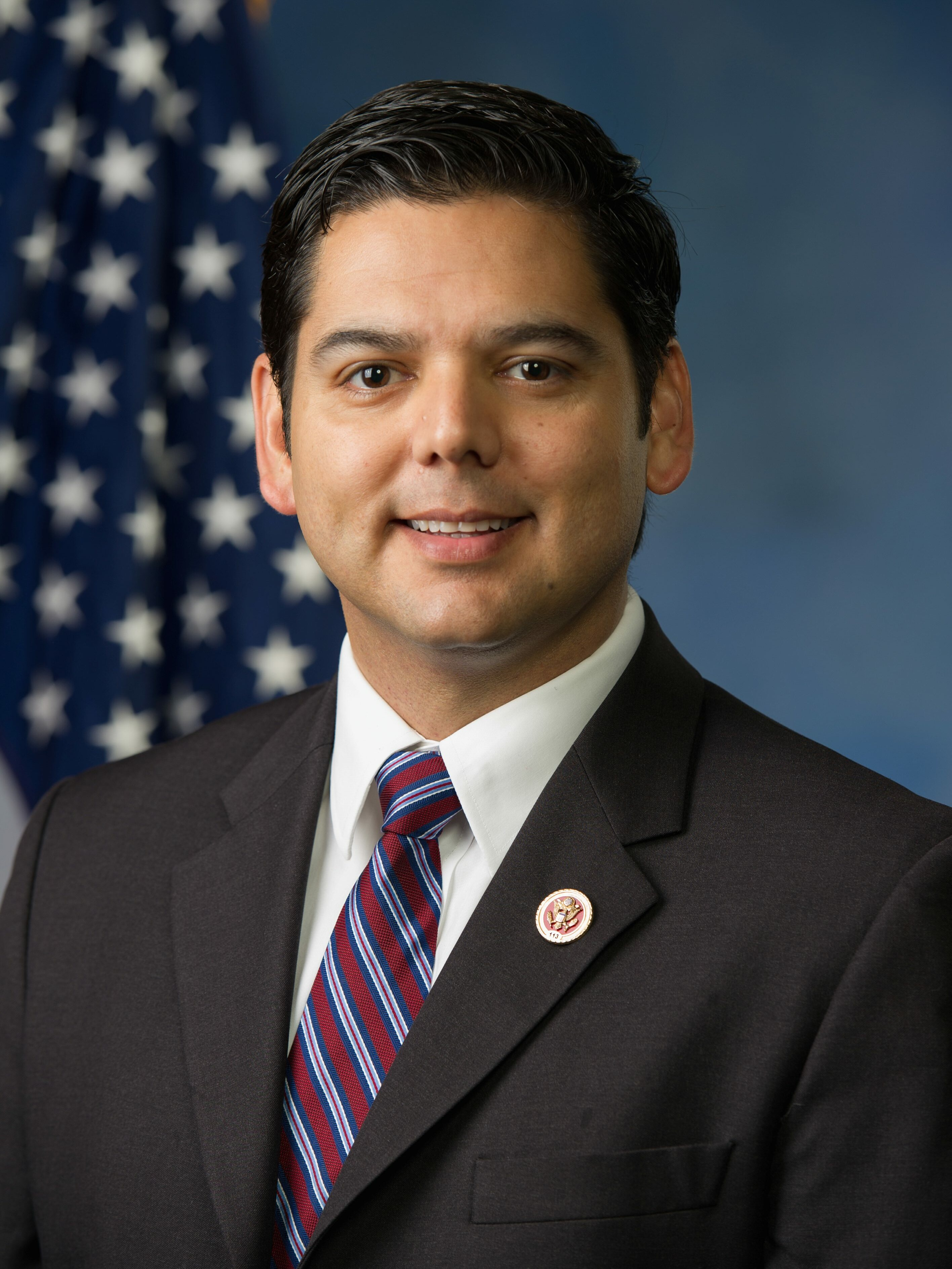

Candidate	Raul Ruiz	Erin Cruz
Party	Democratic	Republican
Popular vote	185,051	121,640
Percentage	60.3%	39.7%
- County results Ruiz: 60–70%
U.S. Representative before election
Raul Ruiz
Democratic
Elected U.S. Representative
Raul Ruiz
Democratic

The 36th district encompasses eastern Riverside County, including the desert communities of Palm Springs, Palm Desert, Indio, Coachella, Rancho Mirage, Desert Hot Springs, Indian Wells, and Cathedral City, as well as Calimesa, Banning, Beaumont, San Jacinto, and Hemet. The incumbent was Democrat Raul Ruiz, who was re-elected with 59.0% of the vote in 2018.

=== Candidates ===
==== Advanced to general ====
- Erin Cruz (Republican), author and candidate for U.S. Senate in 2018
- Raul Ruiz (Democratic), incumbent U.S. representative

==== Eliminated in primary ====
- Patrice Kimbler (Republican)
- Milo Stevanovich (Republican), attorney

===== Withdrawn =====
- Raul Ruiz (Republican)

=== Predictions ===
Source	Ranking	As of
The Cook Political Report	Safe D	July 2, 2020
Inside Elections	Safe D	June 2, 2020
Sabato's Crystal Ball	Safe D	July 2, 2020
Politico	Safe D	October 11, 2020
Daily Kos	Safe D	June 3, 2020
RCP	Safe D	June 9, 2020
Niskanen	Safe D	June 7, 2020

=== Results ===
California's 36th congressional district, 2020
Primary election
Party	Candidate	Votes	%
Democratic	Raul Ruiz (incumbent)	96,266	60.5
Republican	Erin Cruz	33,984	21.4
Republican	Milo Stevanovich	16,775	10.5
Republican	Patrice Kimbler	12,031	7.6
Democratic	Gina Chapa (write-in)	45	0.0
Total votes		159,101	100.0
General election
Democratic	Raul Ruiz (incumbent)	185,151	60.3
Republican	Erin Cruz	121,698	39.7
Total votes		306,849	100.0
Democratic hold			

== District 37 ==
2020 California's 37th congressional district election
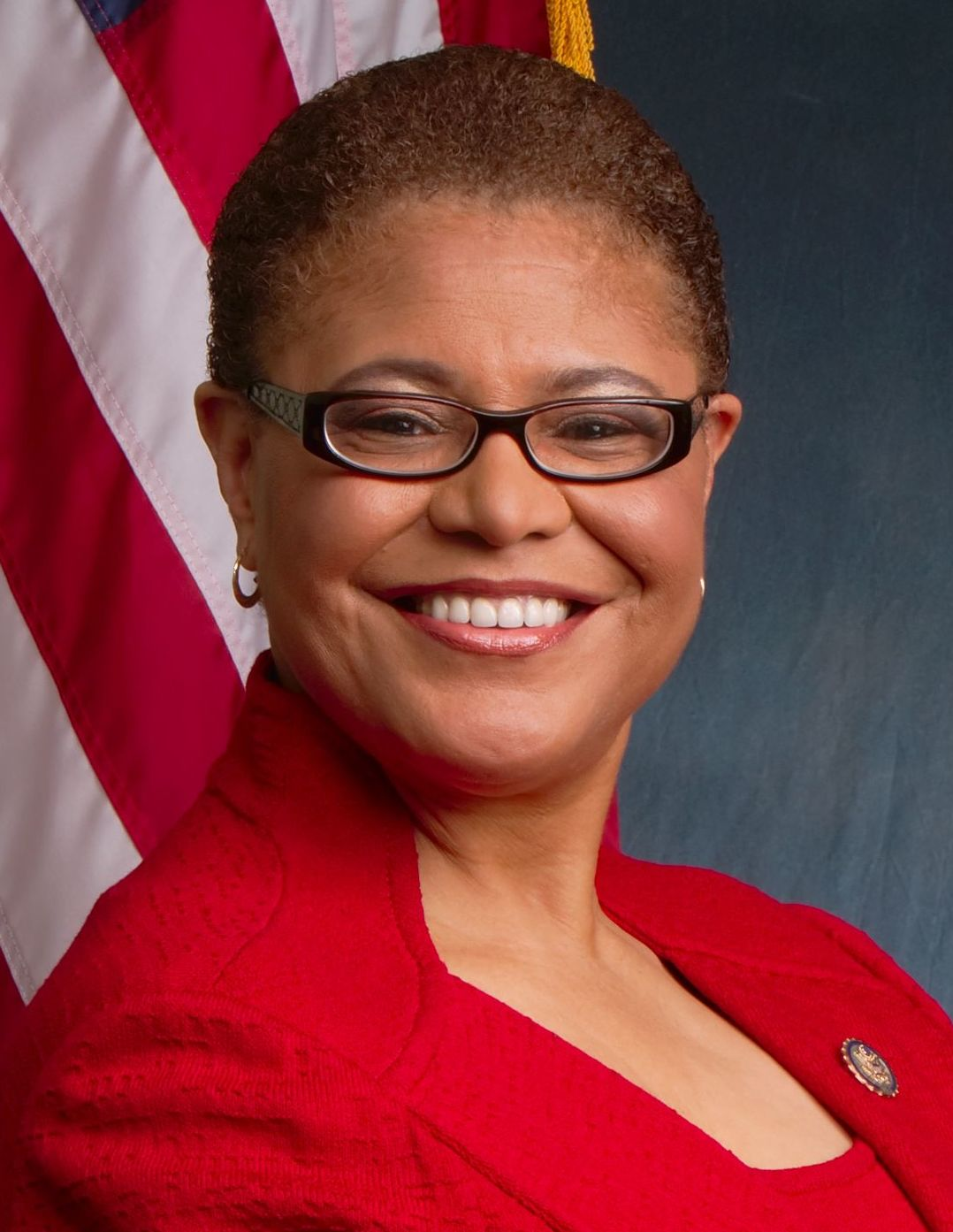

Candidate	Karen Bass	Errol Webber
Party	Democratic	Republican
Popular vote	254,916	41,705
Percentage	85.9%	14.1%
- County results Bass: 80–90%
U.S. Representative before election
Karen Bass
Democratic
Elected U.S. Representative
Karen Bass
Democratic

The 37th district encompasses west and southwest Los Angeles, as well as Culver City and Inglewood. The incumbent was Democrat Karen Bass, who was re-elected with 89.1% of the vote in 2018.

=== Candidates ===
==== Advanced to general ====
- Karen Bass (Democratic), incumbent U.S. representative
- Errol Webber (Republican), documentary film producer

==== Eliminated in primary ====
- Larry Thompson (no party preference), attorney

=== Predictions ===
Source	Ranking	As of
The Cook Political Report	Safe D	July 2, 2020
Inside Elections	Safe D	June 2, 2020
Sabato's Crystal Ball	Safe D	July 2, 2020
Politico	Safe D	April 19, 2020
Daily Kos	Safe D	June 3, 2020
RCP	Safe D	June 9, 2020
Niskanen	Safe D	June 7, 2020

=== Results ===
California's 37th congressional district, 2020
Primary election
Party	Candidate	Votes	%
Democratic	Karen Bass (incumbent)	140,425	88.1
Republican	Errol Webber	12,101	7.6
No party preference	Larry Thompson	6,796	4.3
Total votes		159,322	100.0
General election
Democratic	Karen Bass (incumbent)	254,916	85.9
Republican	Errol Webber	41,705	14.1
Total votes		296,621	100.0
Democratic hold			

== District 38 ==
2020 California's 38th congressional district election
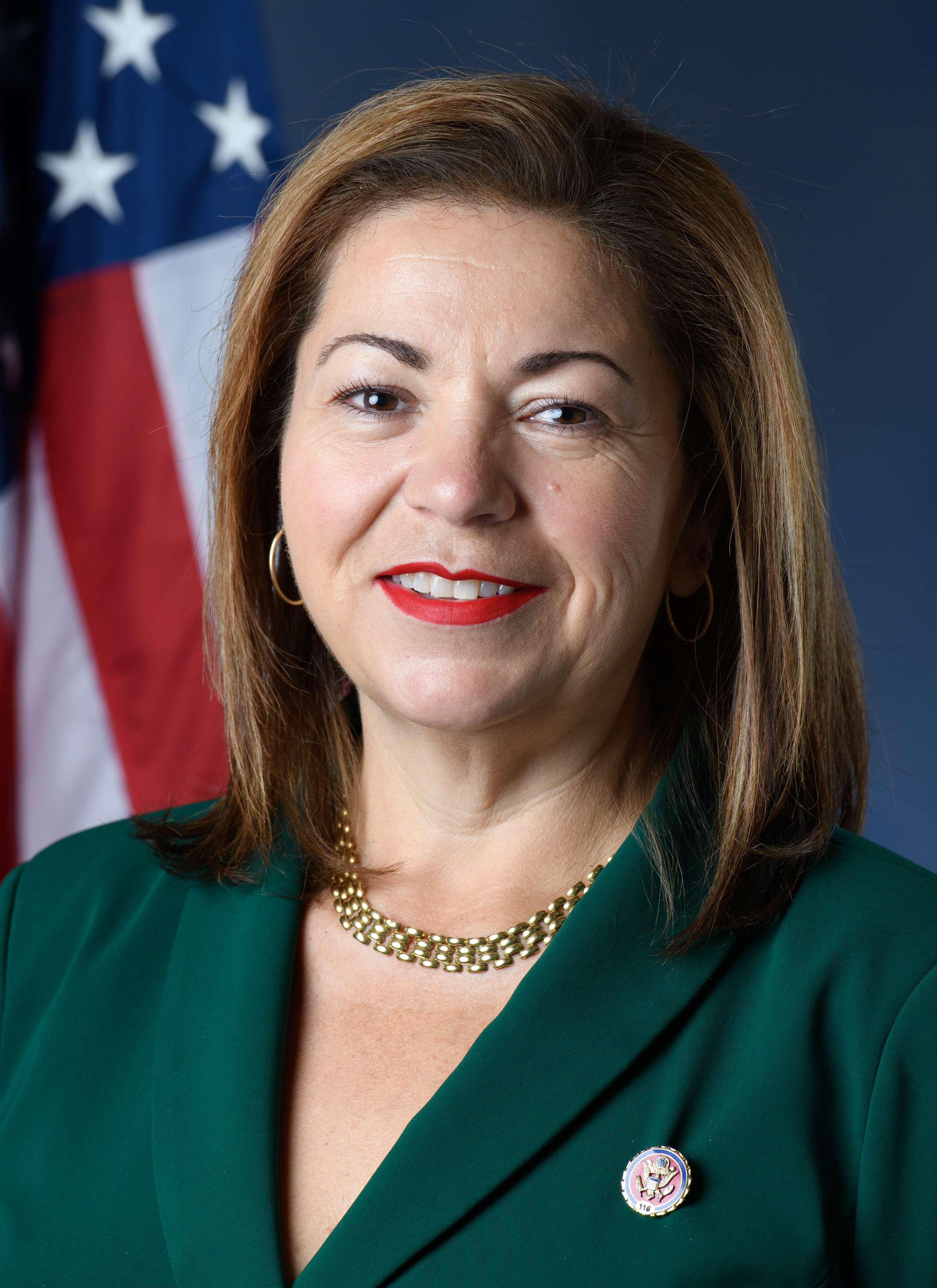

Candidate	Linda Sánchez	Michael Tolar
Party	Democratic	Democratic
Popular vote	190,467	65,739
Percentage	74.3%	25.7%
U.S. Representative before election
Linda Sánchez
Democratic
Elected U.S. Representative
Linda Sánchez
Democratic

The 38th district takes encompasses southeastern Los Angeles County, as well as a small sliver of Orange County, taking in La Palma. The incumbent was Democrat Linda Sánchez, who was re-elected with 68.9% of the vote in 2018.

=== Candidates ===
==== Advanced to general ====
- Linda Sánchez (Democratic), incumbent U.S. representative
- Michael Tolar (Democratic), retail store worker

=== Predictions ===
Source	Ranking	As of
The Cook Political Report	Safe D	July 2, 2020
Inside Elections	Safe D	June 2, 2020
Sabato's Crystal Ball	Safe D	July 2, 2020
Politico	Safe D	April 19, 2020
Daily Kos	Safe D	June 3, 2020
RCP	Safe D	June 9, 2020
Niskanen	Safe D	June 7, 2020

=== Results ===
2020 California's 38th congressional district primary results by county Map legend: Sánchez—70–80%

California's 38th congressional district, 2020
Primary election
Party	Candidate	Votes	%
Democratic	Linda Sánchez (incumbent)	90,872	77.7
Democratic	Michael Tolar	26,075	22.3
Total votes		116,947	100.0
General election
Democratic	Linda Sánchez (incumbent)	190,467	74.3
Democratic	Michael Tolar	65,739	25.7
Total votes		256,206	100.0
Democratic hold			

== District 39 ==
2020 California's 39th congressional district election
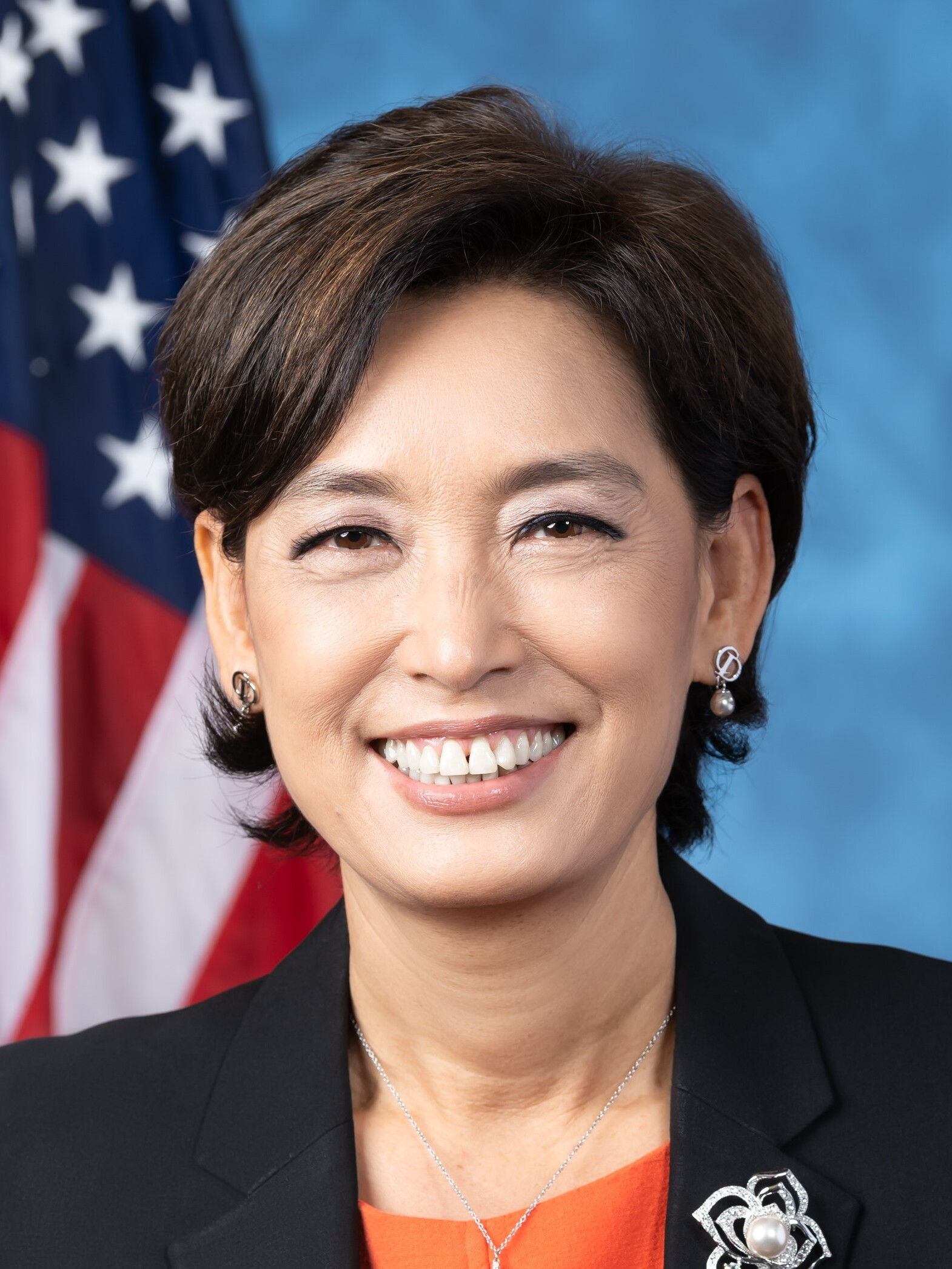

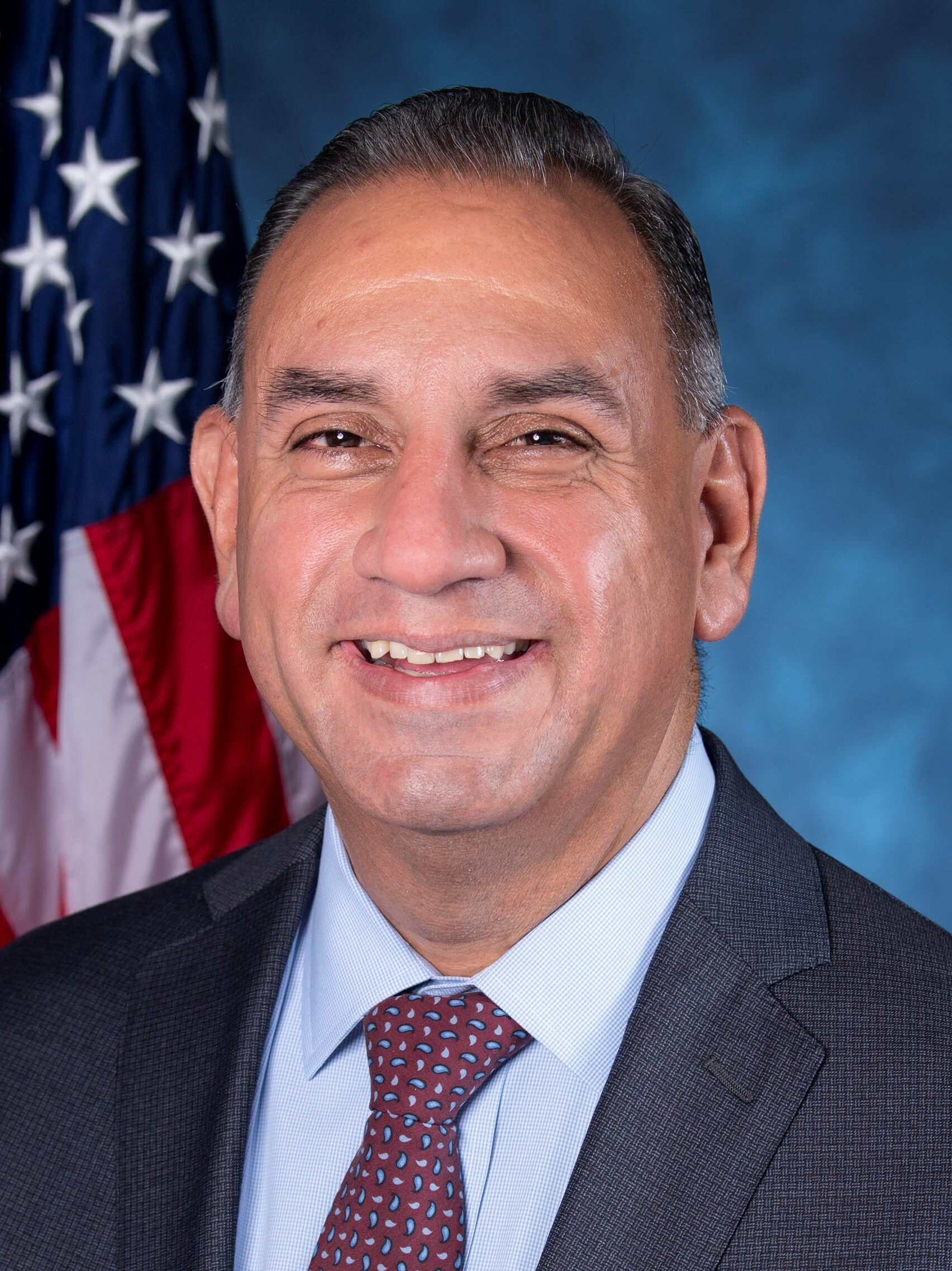
Candidate	Young Kim	Gil Cisneros
Party	Republican	Democratic
Popular vote	173,946	169,837
Percentage	50.6%	49.4%
- County results Cisneros: 50–60% Kim: 50–60%
U.S. Representative before election
Gil Cisneros
Democratic
Elected U.S. Representative
Young Kim
Republican

The 39th district encompasses parts of the San Gabriel Valley, taking in La Habra Heights, Diamond Bar, Walnut, Hacienda Heights and Rowland Heights, as well as northern Orange County, including Fullerton, La Habra, Brea, Buena Park, Placentia, and Yorba Linda (the hometown of Republican president Richard Nixon). The district also takes in a small portion of southwestern San Bernardino County, covering Chino Hills. The incumbent representative, Democrat Gil Cisneros, who flipped the district and was elected in 2018, lost reelection to Republican candidate Young Kim. Kim became one of the first three Korean-American women elected to Congress.

=== Candidates ===
==== Advanced to general ====
- Gil Cisneros (Democratic), incumbent U.S. representative
- Young Kim (Republican), former state assemblywoman and candidate for California's 39th congressional district in 2018

==== Eliminated in primary ====
- Steve Cox (no party preference), motorcycle journalist and candidate for California's 39th congressional district in 2018

=== Endorsements ===
Gil Cisneros (D)

Former U.S. executive branch officials

- Barack Obama, former president of the United States (2009–2017, former senator from Illinois (2005–2008)

Organizations

- Asian American Action Fund
- Brady Campaign
- California League of Conservation Voters
- Council for a Livable World
- End Citizens United
- Human Rights Campaign
- League of Conservation Voters Action Fund
- Planned Parenthood Action Fund
- Sierra Club
Young Kim (R)

U.S. representatives

- Kevin McCarthy, House minority leader, U.S. representative from CA-23 (2013–present), CA-22 (2007–2013)
- Gary Miller, former U.S. representative from CA-31 from (1999–2015)

Municipal officials

- Kathryn Barger, Los Angeles County supervisor (2016–present)

Organizations

- Howard Jarvis Taxpayers Association PAC
- Maggie's List
- Susan B. Anthony List
- Tea Party Express
- United States Chamber of Commerce

Newspapers

- Orange County Register

=== Predictions ===
Source	Ranking	As of
The Cook Political Report	Likely D	July 17, 2020
Inside Elections	Likely D	June 2, 2020
Sabato's Crystal Ball	Lean D	July 2, 2020
Politico	Lean D	October 11, 2020
Daily Kos	Lean D	June 3, 2020
RCP	Tossup	June 9, 2020
Niskanen	Safe D	June 7, 2020

=== Polling ===
==== General election ====
Poll source	Date(s) administered	Sample size	Margin of error	Gil Cisneros (D)	Young Kim (R)	Undecided
Public Opinion Strategies (R) (Note: Poll conducted for Kim's campaign.)	October 11–14, 2020	400 (LV)	± 4.9%	46%	47%	6%
Public Opinion Strategies (R)	July 27–30, 2020	400 (LV)	± 4.9%	47%	45%	8%

Hypothetical polling

with generic Republican

Poll source	Date(s) administered	Sample size	Margin of error	Gil Cisneros (D)	Generic Republican	Undecided
TargetPoint (R) (Note: Poll sponsored by the National Republican Congressional Committee)	June 30 – July 2, 2019	400 (LV)	± 4.9%	44%	46%	9%

=== Results ===
2020 California's 39th congressional district primary results by county Map legend: Kim—50–60%; Kim—40–50%; Cisneros—50–60%

California's 39th congressional district, 2020
Primary election
Party	Candidate	Votes	%
Republican	Young Kim	83,941	48.3
Democratic	Gil Cisneros (incumbent)	81,402	46.9
No party preference	Steve Cox	8,286	4.8
Total votes		173,629	100.0
General election
Republican	Young Kim	173,946	50.6
Democratic	Gil Cisneros (incumbent)	169,837	49.4
Total votes		343,783	100.0
Republican gain from Democratic			

== District 40 ==
2020 California's 40th congressional district election
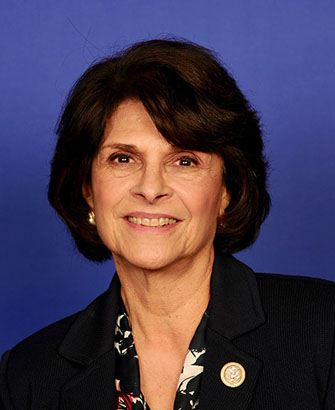

Candidate	Lucille Roybal-Allard	Antonio Delgado
Party	Democratic	Republican
Popular vote	135,572	50,809
Percentage	72.7%	27.3%
- County results Roybal-allard: 70–80%
U.S. Representative before election
Lucille Roybal-Allard
Democratic
Elected U.S. Representative
Lucille Roybal-Allard
Democratic

The 40th district is centered around East Los Angeles and also includes Downey, Bellflower, and Commerce. The incumbent was Democrat Lucille Roybal-Allard, who was re-elected with 77.3% of the vote in 2018.

=== Candidates ===
==== Advanced to general ====
- C. Antonio Delgado (Republican), immigration attorney
- Lucille Roybal-Allard (Democratic), incumbent U.S. representative

==== Eliminated in primary ====
- Rodolfo Cortes Barragan (Green), scientist and candidate for California's 40th congressional district in 2018
- Anthony Felix Jr. (Democratic), homeless services analyst
- Michael Donnell Graham Jr. (American Independent)
- David John Sanchez (Democratic), teacher, activist, and founding member of the Brown Berets

=== Predictions ===
Source	Ranking	As of
The Cook Political Report	Safe D	July 2, 2020
Inside Elections	Safe D	June 2, 2020
Sabato's Crystal Ball	Safe D	July 2, 2020
Politico	Safe D	April 19, 2020
Daily Kos	Safe D	June 3, 2020
RCP	Safe D	June 9, 2020
Niskanen	Safe D	June 7, 2020

=== Results ===
California's 40th congressional district, 2020
Primary election
Party	Candidate	Votes	%
Democratic	Lucille Roybal-Allard (incumbent)	38,837	50.7
Republican	C. Antonio Delgado	10,467	13.7
Democratic	David John Sanchez	10,256	13.4
Democratic	Anthony Felix Jr.	9,473	12.4
Green	Rodolfo Cortes Barragan	5,578	7.3
American Independent	Michael Donnell Graham Jr.	1,967	2.6
Total votes		76,578	100.0
General election
Democratic	Lucille Roybal-Allard (incumbent)	135,572	72.7
Republican	C. Antonio Delgado	50,809	27.3
Total votes		186,381	100.0
Democratic hold			

== District 41 ==
2020 California's 41st congressional district election
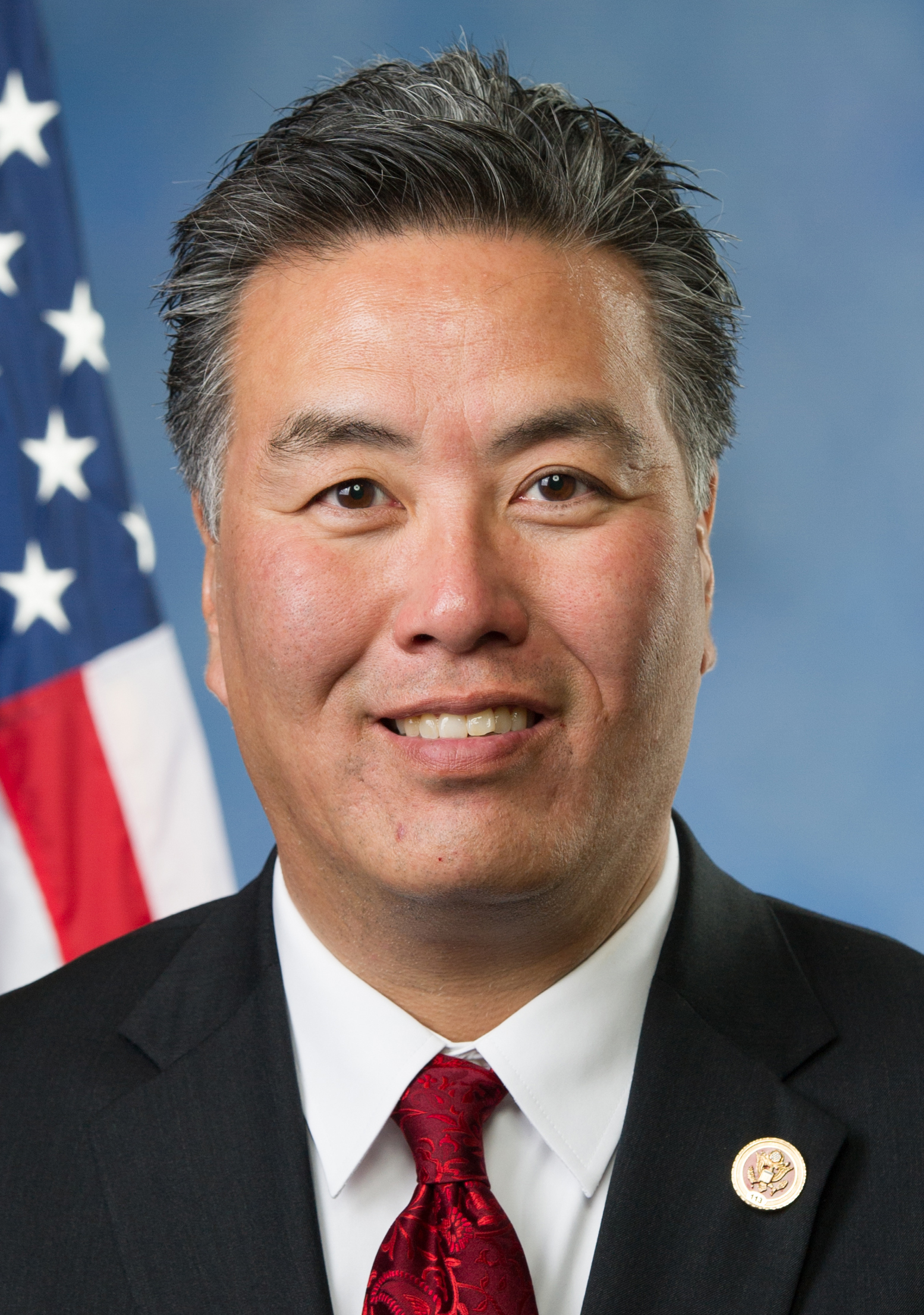

Candidate	Mark Takano	Aja Smith
Party	Democratic	Republican
Popular vote	167,938	94,289
Percentage	64.0%	36.0%
- County results Takano: 60–70%
U.S. Representative before election
Mark Takano
Democratic
Elected U.S. Representative
Mark Takano
Democratic

The 41st district is located in the Inland Empire and takes in western Riverside County, including Jurupa Valley, Moreno Valley, Perris, and Riverside. The incumbent was Democrat Mark Takano, who was re-elected with 65.1% of the vote in 2018.

=== Candidates ===
==== Advanced to general ====
- Aja Smith (Republican), U.S. Air Force veteran and candidate for California's 41st congressional district in 2018
- Mark Takano (Democratic), incumbent U.S. representative

==== Eliminated in primary ====
- Grace Williams (Democratic), former Perris city official

=== Endorsements ===
Mark Takano (D)

Organizations

- California League of Conservation Voters
- Human Rights Campaign
- LGBTQ Victory Fund
- Sierra Club

=== Predictions ===
Source	Ranking	As of
The Cook Political Report	Safe D	July 2, 2020
Inside Elections	Safe D	June 2, 2020
Sabato's Crystal Ball	Safe D	July 2, 2020
Politico	Safe D	April 19, 2020
Daily Kos	Safe D	June 3, 2020
RCP	Safe D	June 9, 2020
Niskanen	Safe D	June 7, 2020

=== Results ===
California's 41st congressional district, 2020
Primary election
Party	Candidate	Votes	%
Democratic	Mark Takano (incumbent)	58,723	50.8
Republican	Aja Smith	38,231	33.0
Democratic	Grace Williams	18,731	16.2
No party preference	Anza Akram (write-in)	2	0.0
Total votes		115,687	100.0
General election
Democratic	Mark Takano (incumbent)	168,126	64.0
Republican	Aja Smith	94,447	36.0
Total votes		262,573	100.0
Democratic hold			

== District 42 ==
2020 California's 42nd congressional district election
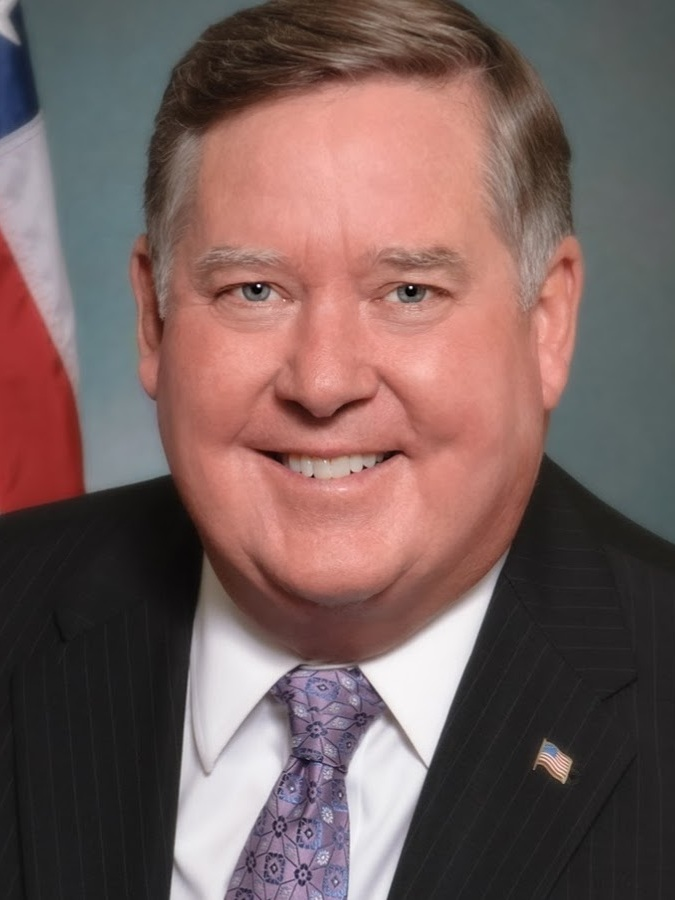

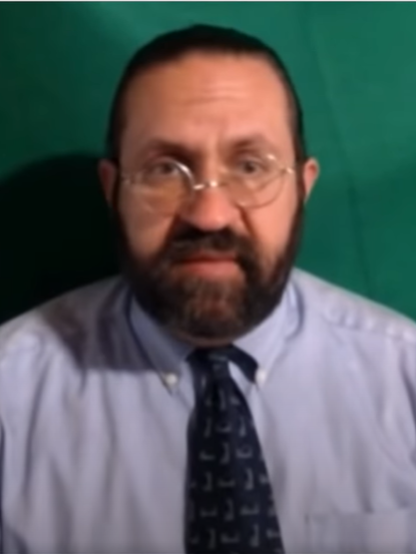
Candidate	Ken Calvert	Liam O'Mara
Party	Republican	Democratic
Popular vote	210,274	157,773
Percentage	57.1%	42.9%
- County results Calvert: 50–60%
U.S. Representative before election
Ken Calvert
Republican
Elected U.S. Representative
Ken Calvert
Republican

The 42nd district is encompasses western and southwestern Riverside County, and includes Eastvale, Norco, Corona, Temescal Valley, Lake Elsinore, Canyon Lake, Wildomar, north Temecula, Murrieta and Menifee. The incumbent was Republican Ken Calvert, who was re-elected with 56.5% of the vote in 2018.

=== Candidates ===
==== Advanced to general ====
- Ken Calvert (Republican), incumbent U.S. representative
- William "Liam" O'Mara (Democratic), historian and college professor

==== Eliminated in primary ====
- Regina Marston (Democratic), businesswoman

==== Withdrew ====
- Julia Peacock (Democratic), public high school teacher and candidate for California's 42nd congressional district in 2018

=== Predictions ===
Source	Ranking	As of
The Cook Political Report	Safe R	July 2, 2020
Inside Elections	Safe R	June 2, 2020
Sabato's Crystal Ball	Safe R	July 2, 2020
Politico	Likely R	April 19, 2020
Daily Kos	Safe R	June 3, 2020
RCP	Safe R	October 24, 2020
Niskanen	Safe R	June 7, 2020

=== Results ===
California's 42nd congressional district, 2020
Primary election
Party	Candidate	Votes	%
Republican	Ken Calvert (incumbent)	97,781	58.3
Democratic	William "Liam" O'Mara	38,506	22.9
Democratic	Regina Marston	31,587	18.8
Total votes		167,874	100.0
General election
Republican	Ken Calvert (incumbent)	210,274	57.1
Democratic	William "Liam" O'Mara	157,773	42.9
Total votes		368,047	100.0
Republican hold			

== District 43 ==
2020 California's 43rd congressional district election
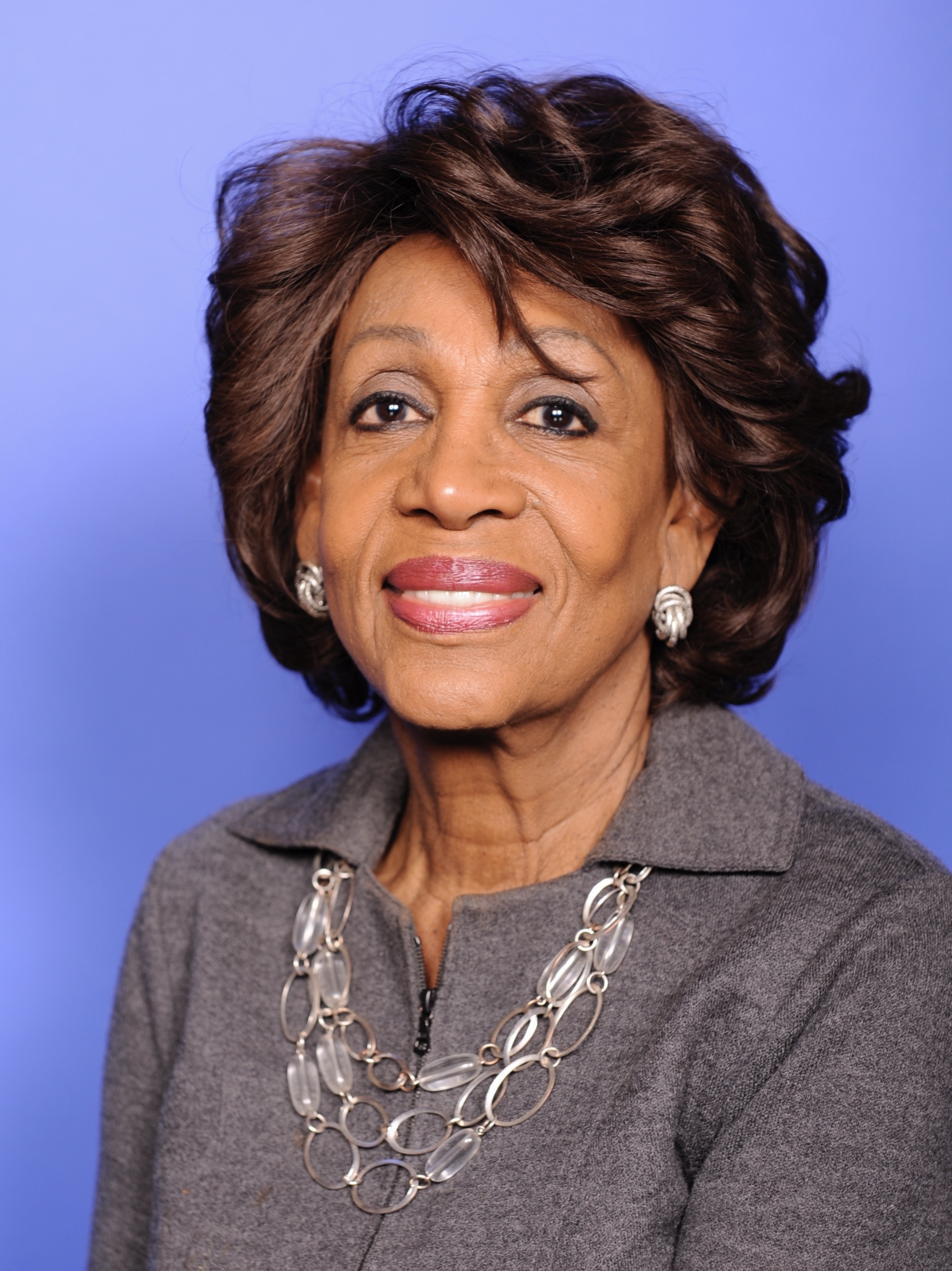

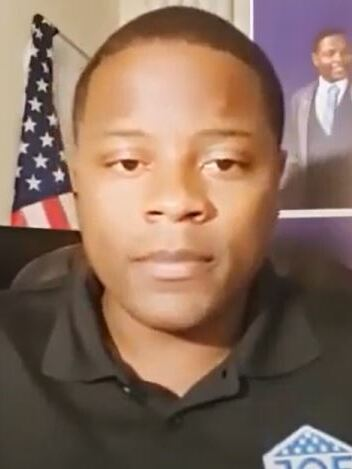
Candidate	Maxine Waters	Joe Collins
Party	Democratic	Republican
Popular vote	199,210	78,688
Percentage	71.7%	28.3%
- County results Waters: 70–80%
U.S. Representative before election
Maxine Waters
Democratic
Elected U.S. Representative
Maxine Waters
Democratic

The 43rd district is based in southern Los Angeles County and includes portions of Los Angeles and Torrance, as well as all of Hawthorne, Lawndale, Gardena, Inglewood and Lomita. The incumbent was Democrat Maxine Waters, who was re-elected with 77.7% of the vote in 2018.

=== Candidates ===
==== Advanced to general ====
- Joe Collins III (Republican), U.S. Navy veteran
- Maxine Waters (Democratic), incumbent U.S. representative

==== Eliminated in primary ====
- Omar Navarro (Republican), businessman and candidate for California's 43rd congressional district in 2016 and 2018

=== Endorsements ===
Joe Collins III

U.S. executive branch officials

- Donald Trump, 45th president of the United States

U.S. representatives

- Andy Biggs, U.S. representative from Arizona's 5th congressional district

State representatives

- Anthony Sabatini, Florida representative from the 32nd House district

=== Predictions ===
Source	Ranking	As of
The Cook Political Report	Safe D	July 2, 2020
Inside Elections	Safe D	June 2, 2020
Sabato's Crystal Ball	Safe D	July 2, 2020
Politico	Safe D	April 19, 2020
Daily Kos	Safe D	June 3, 2020
RCP	Safe D	June 9, 2020
Niskanen	Safe D	June 7, 2020

=== Results ===
California's 43rd congressional district, 2020
Primary election
Party	Candidate	Votes	%
Democratic	Maxine Waters (incumbent)	100,468	78.1
Republican	Joe E. Collins III	14,189	11.0
Republican	Omar Navarro	13,939	10.8
Total votes		128,596	100.0
General election
Democratic	Maxine Waters (incumbent)	199,210	71.7
Republican	Joe E. Collins III	78,688	28.3
Total votes		277,898	100.0
Democratic hold			

== District 44 ==
2020 California's 44th congressional district election
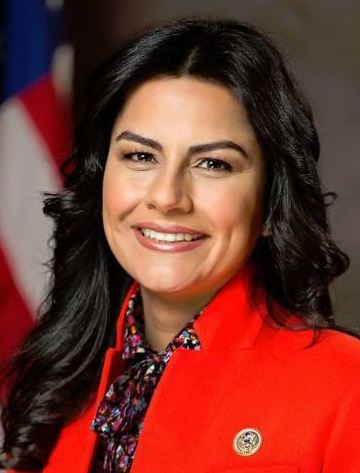

Candidate	Nanette Barragán	Analilia Joya
Party	Democratic	Democratic
Popular vote	139,661	66,375
Percentage	67.8%	32.2%
U.S. Representative before election
Nanette Barragán
Democratic
Elected U.S. Representative
Nanette Barragán
Democratic

The 44th district is based in southern Los Angeles County and includes Carson, Compton, Lynwood, North Long Beach, and San Pedro. The incumbent was Democrat Nanette Barragán, who was re-elected with 68.3% of the vote in 2018.

=== Candidates ===
==== Advanced to general ====
- Nanette Barragán (Democratic), incumbent U.S. representative
- Analilia Joya (Democratic), teacher and disability advocate

==== Eliminated in primary ====
- Billy Z. Earley (Republican), healthcare advocate
- Morris F. Griffin (Democratic), maintenance technician

=== Predictions ===
Source	Ranking	As of
The Cook Political Report	Safe D	July 2, 2020
Inside Elections	Safe D	June 2, 2020
Sabato's Crystal Ball	Safe D	July 2, 2020
Politico	Safe D	April 19, 2020
Daily Kos	Safe D	June 3, 2020
RCP	Safe D	June 9, 2020
Niskanen	Safe D	June 7, 2020

=== Results ===
California's 44th congressional district, 2020
Primary election
Party	Candidate	Votes	%
Democratic	Nanette Barragán (incumbent)	57,033	63.5
Democratic	Analilia Joya	13,032	14.5
Republican	Billy Z. Earley	11,846	13.2
Democratic	Morris F. Griffin	7,901	8.8
Total votes		89,812	100.0
General election
Democratic	Nanette Barragán (incumbent)	139,661	67.8
Democratic	Analilia Joya	66,375	32.2
Total votes		206,036	100.0
Democratic hold			

== District 45 ==
2020 California's 45th congressional district election
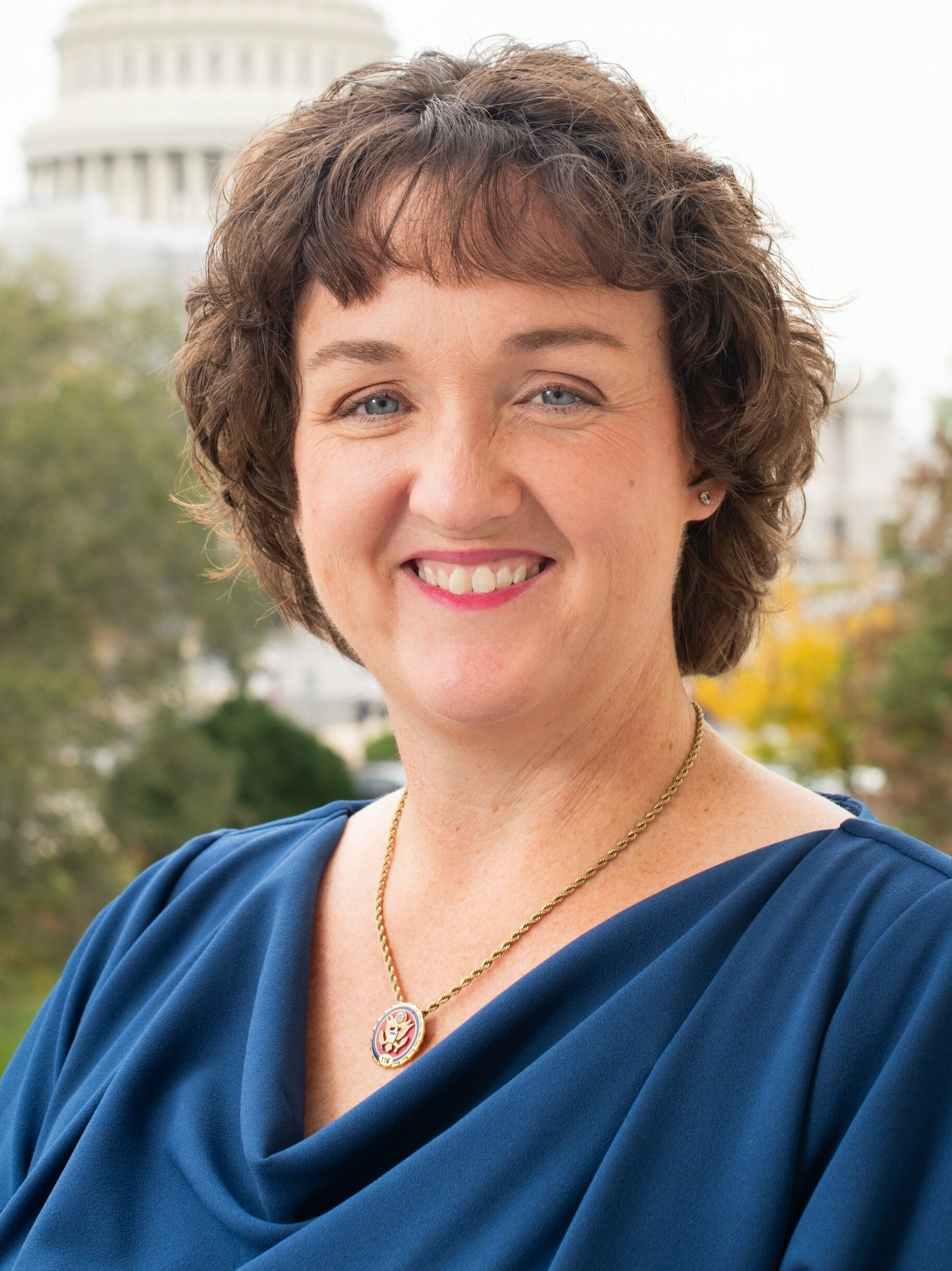

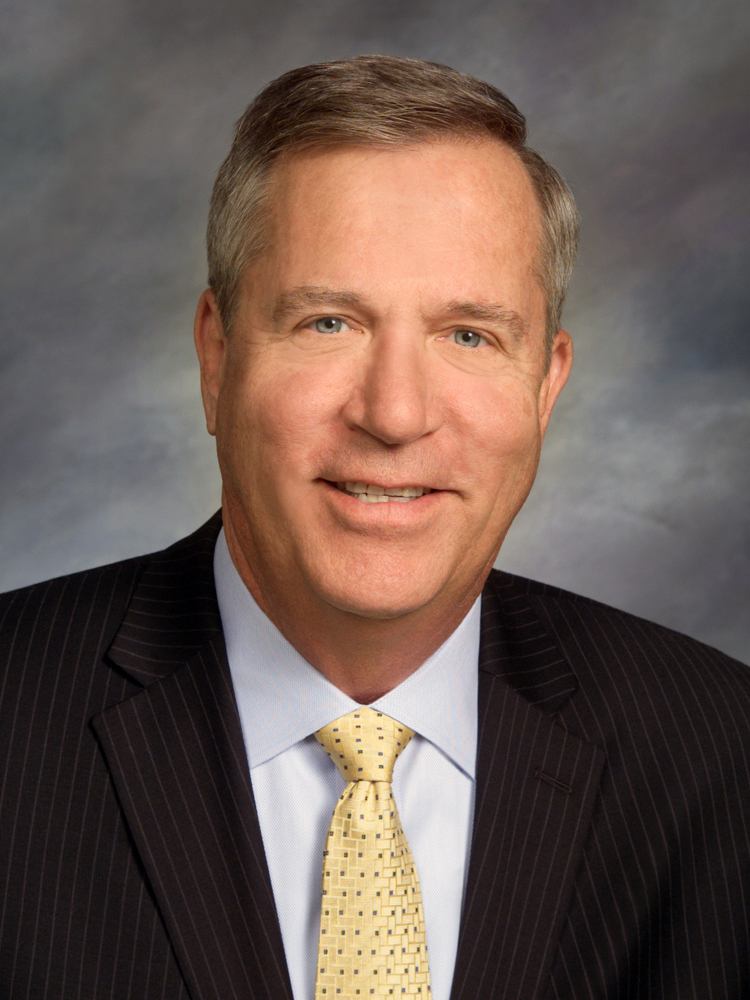
Candidate	Katie Porter	Greg Raths
Party	Democratic	Republican
Popular vote	221,843	193,096
Percentage	53.5%	46.5%
- Porter: 50–60% 60–70% 70–80% 80–90% >90% Raths: 50–60% 60–70% 70–80% 80–90% No votes
U.S. Representative before election
Katie Porter
Democratic
Elected U.S. Representative
Katie Porter
Democratic

The 45th district is based in central Orange County, encompassing Irvine, Tustin, North Tustin, Villa Park, Anaheim Hills, eastern Orange, Laguna Hills, Laguna Woods, Lake Forest, Rancho Santa Margarita, Coto de Caza and Mission Viejo. The incumbent was Democrat Katie Porter, who flipped the district and was elected with 52.1% of the vote in 2018.

=== Candidates ===
==== Advanced to general ====
- Katie Porter (Democratic), incumbent U.S. representative
- Greg Raths (Republican), retired United States Marine Corps Colonel, former mayor of Mission Viejo and candidate for California's 45th congressional district in 2014 and 2016

==== Eliminated in primary ====
- Rhonda Furin (Republican), special education teacher
- Christopher J. Gonzales (Republican), attorney and U.S. Army veteran
- Peggy Huang (Republican), Yorba Linda city councilwoman and former mayor of Yorba Linda
- Don Sedgwick (Republican), mayor of Laguna Hills
- Lisa Sparks (Republican), Orange County Department of Education trustee and Chapman University professor

==== Withdrew ====
- Ray Gennawey (Republican), Orange County prosecutor
- Brenton Woolworth (Republican), businessman

==== Declined ====
- Mimi Walters (Republican), former U.S. representative

=== Endorsements ===
Katie Porter (D)

Former U.S. executive branch officials

- Barack Obama, former president of the United States (2009–2017), former senator from Illinois (2005–2008)

Organizations

- California League of Conservation Voters
- California Teachers Association
- Democracy for America
- EMILY's List
- Human Rights Campaign
- League of Conservation Voters Action Fund
- National Iranian American Council
- Planned Parenthood Action Fund
- Sierra Club
Greg Raths (R)

U.S. Representatives

- Jack Bergman, U.S. representative (MI-1) and retired Marine lt. general
- Mary Bono, former U.S. representative (CA-44), (CA-45)
- Paul J. Cook, U.S. representative (CA-8) and retired Marine colonel
- Barry Goldwater Jr., former U.S. representative (CA-20), (CA-27)

State officials

- Travis Allen, former California State Assemblyman and candidate for Governor of California in 2018

County officials

- Donald P. Wagner, Orange County Supervisor and former California State Assemblyman

Local officials

- Brian Maryott, Mayor of San Juan Capistrano and candidate for California's 49th Congressional District

Retired military officers

- Michael J. Aguilar, retired United States Marine Corps brigadier general
- John K. Davis, retired United States Marine Corps four-star general
- Timothy F. Ghormley, retired United States Marine Corps major general
- Keith J. Stalder, retired United States Marine Corps general

Others

- Kelly Ernby, Orange County Deputy District Attorney and candidate for California State Assembly
- Ray Gennawey, former candidate for California's 45th Congressional District in 2020 and Orange County Deputy District Attorney

Organizations

- Combat Veterans for Congress
- Greater Irvine Republicans
- SEALPAC

=== Predictions ===
Source	Ranking	As of
The Cook Political Report	Safe D	August 14, 2020
Inside Elections	Safe D	June 2, 2020
Sabato's Crystal Ball	Safe D	July 2, 2020
Politico	Likely D	July 6, 2020
Daily Kos	Safe D	October 26, 2020
RCP	Likely D	October 24, 2020
Niskanen	Safe D	June 7, 2020

=== Polling ===
==== Primary election ====
Poll source	Date(s) administered	Sample size	Margin of error	Katie Porter (D)	Ray Gennawey (R)	Peggy Huang (R)	Greg Raths (R)	Don Sedgwick (R)	Lisa Sparks (R)	Undecided
Fabrizio, Lee & Associates (R) (Note: Poll sponsored by Greg Raths)	August 15–18, 2019	300 (LV)	± 5.7%	46%	2%	2%	10%	3%	1%	38%

=== Results ===
2020 California's 45th congressional district primary results by county supervisorial district Map legend: Porter—50–60%; Porter—40–50%; No votes

California's 45th congressional district, 2020
Primary election
Party	Candidate	Votes	%
Democratic	Katie Porter (incumbent)	112,986	50.8
Republican	Greg Raths	39,942	17.9
Republican	Don Sedgwick	28,465	12.8
Republican	Peggy Huang	24,780	11.1
Republican	Lisa Sparks	8,861	4.0
Republican	Christopher J. Gonzales	5,443	2.4
Republican	Rhonda Furin	2,140	1.0
Total votes		222,617	100.0
General election
Democratic	Katie Porter (incumbent)	221,843	53.5
Republican	Greg Raths	193,096	46.5
Total votes		414,939	100.0
Democratic hold			

== District 46 ==
2020 California's 46th congressional district election
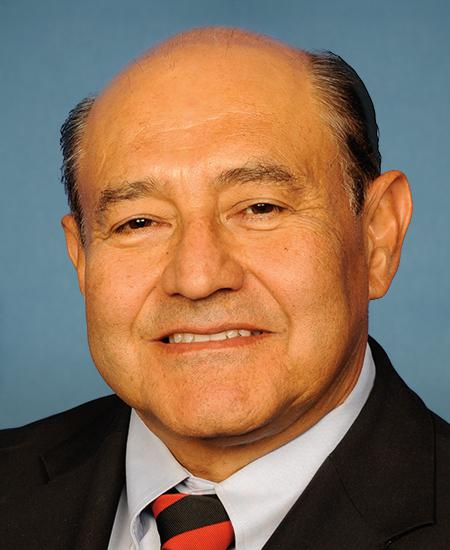

Candidate	Lou Correa	James S. Waters
Party	Democratic	Republican
Popular vote	157,803	71,716
Percentage	68.8%	31.2%
- County results Correa: 60–70%
U.S. Representative before election
Lou Correa
Democratic
Elected U.S. Representative
Lou Correa
Democratic

The 46th district is based in north-central Orange County, taking in Anaheim, Santa Ana, western Orange, and eastern Garden Grove. The incumbent was Democrat Lou Correa, who was reelected with 69.1% of the vote in 2018.

=== Candidates ===
==== Advanced to general ====
- Lou Correa (Democratic), incumbent U.S. representative
- James S. Waters (Republican), retired postman

==== Eliminated in primary ====
- Will Johnson (no party preference), caregiver
- Pablo Mendiolea (Democratic), businessman
- Ed Rushman (no party preference), IT project manager and candidate for California's 46th congressional district in 2018 (American Solidarity)

=== Predictions ===
Source	Ranking	As of
The Cook Political Report	Safe D	July 2, 2020
Inside Elections	Safe D	June 2, 2020
Sabato's Crystal Ball	Safe D	July 2, 2020
Politico	Safe D	April 19, 2020
Daily Kos	Safe D	June 3, 2020
RCP	Safe D	June 9, 2020
Niskanen	Safe D	June 7, 2020

=== Results ===
2020 California's 46th congressional district primary results by county supervisorial district Map legend: Correa—60–70%; Correa—50–60%

California's 46th congressional district, 2020
Primary election
Party	Candidate	Votes	%
Democratic	Lou Correa (incumbent)	60,095	58.2
Republican	James S. Waters	28,302	27.4
Democratic	Pablo Mendiolea	9,257	9.0
No party preference	Ed Rushman	3,288	3.2
No party preference	Will Johnson	2,380	2.3
Total votes		103,322	100.0
General election
Democratic	Lou Correa (incumbent)	157,803	68.8
Republican	James S. Waters	71,716	31.2
Total votes		229,519	100.0
Democratic hold			

== District 47 ==
2020 California's 47th congressional district election
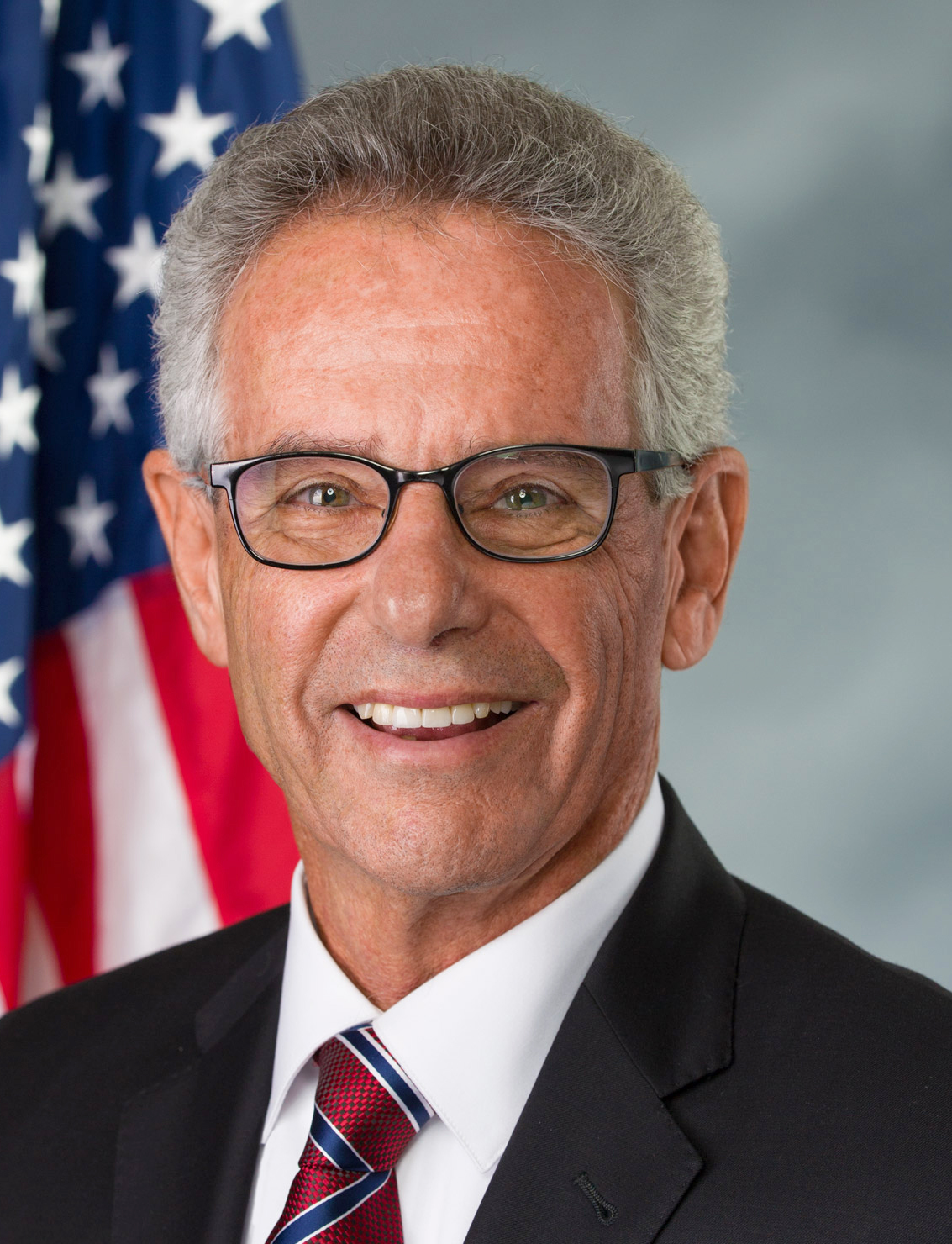

Candidate	Alan Lowenthal	John Briscoe
Party	Democratic	Republican
Popular vote	197,028	114,371
Percentage	63.3%	36.7%
- County results Lowenthal: 50–60% 70–80%
U.S. Representative before election
Alan Lowenthal
Democratic
Elected U.S. Representative
Alan Lowenthal
Democratic

The 47th district is centered in Long Beach and extends into northwestern Orange County, taking in parts of Garden Grove and Westminster, and taking all of Stanton, Los Alamitos, and Cypress. The incumbent was Democrat Alan Lowenthal, who was reelected with 64.9% of the vote in 2018.

=== Candidates ===
==== Advanced to general ====
- John Briscoe (Republican), Ocean View School District trustee and candidate for California's 47th congressional district in 2018
- Alan Lowenthal (Democratic), incumbent U.S. representative

==== Eliminated in primary ====
- Jalen Dupree McLeod (Democratic), teaching assistant
- Peter Mathews (Democratic), Cypress College political science professor
- Sou Moua (Republican), planning commissioner
- Amy Phan West (Republican), candidate for Westminster city council in 2018 and former member of Orange County Parks Commission

=== Endorsements ===
Alan Lowenthal (D)

Labor unions

- California Federation of Teachers
- California Labor Federation
- California Teachers Association
- National Education Association
- National Nurses United
- National Union of Healthcare Workers

Organizations

- Brady Campaign
- California League of Conservation Voters
- Equality California
- Human Rights Campaign
- Humane Society of the United States Legislative Fund
- J Street PAC
- National Organization for Women
- Peace Action
- Planned Parenthood Action Fund
- Sierra Club
- Stonewall Democrats
Peter Mathews (D)

Organizations

- Brand New Congress

=== Predictions ===
Source	Ranking	As of
The Cook Political Report	Safe D	July 2, 2020
Inside Elections	Safe D	June 2, 2020
Sabato's Crystal Ball	Safe D	July 2, 2020
Politico	Safe D	April 19, 2020
Daily Kos	Safe D	June 3, 2020
RCP	Safe D	June 9, 2020
Niskanen	Safe D	June 7, 2020

=== Results ===
2020 California's 47th congressional district primary results by county Map legend: Lowenthal—40–50%; Lowenthal—30–40%

California's 47th congressional district, 2020
Primary election
Party	Candidate	Votes	%
Democratic	Alan Lowenthal (incumbent)	72,759	45.4
Republican	John Briscoe	27,004	16.8
Republican	Amy Phan West	23,175	14.5
Democratic	Peter Mathews	17,616	11.0
Democratic	Jalen Dupree McLeod	13,955	8.7
Republican	Sou Moua	5,866	3.7
Total votes		160,375	100.0
General election
Democratic	Alan Lowenthal (incumbent)	197,028	63.3
Republican	John Briscoe	114,371	36.7
Total votes		311,399	100.0
Democratic hold			

== District 48 ==
2020 California's 48th congressional district election
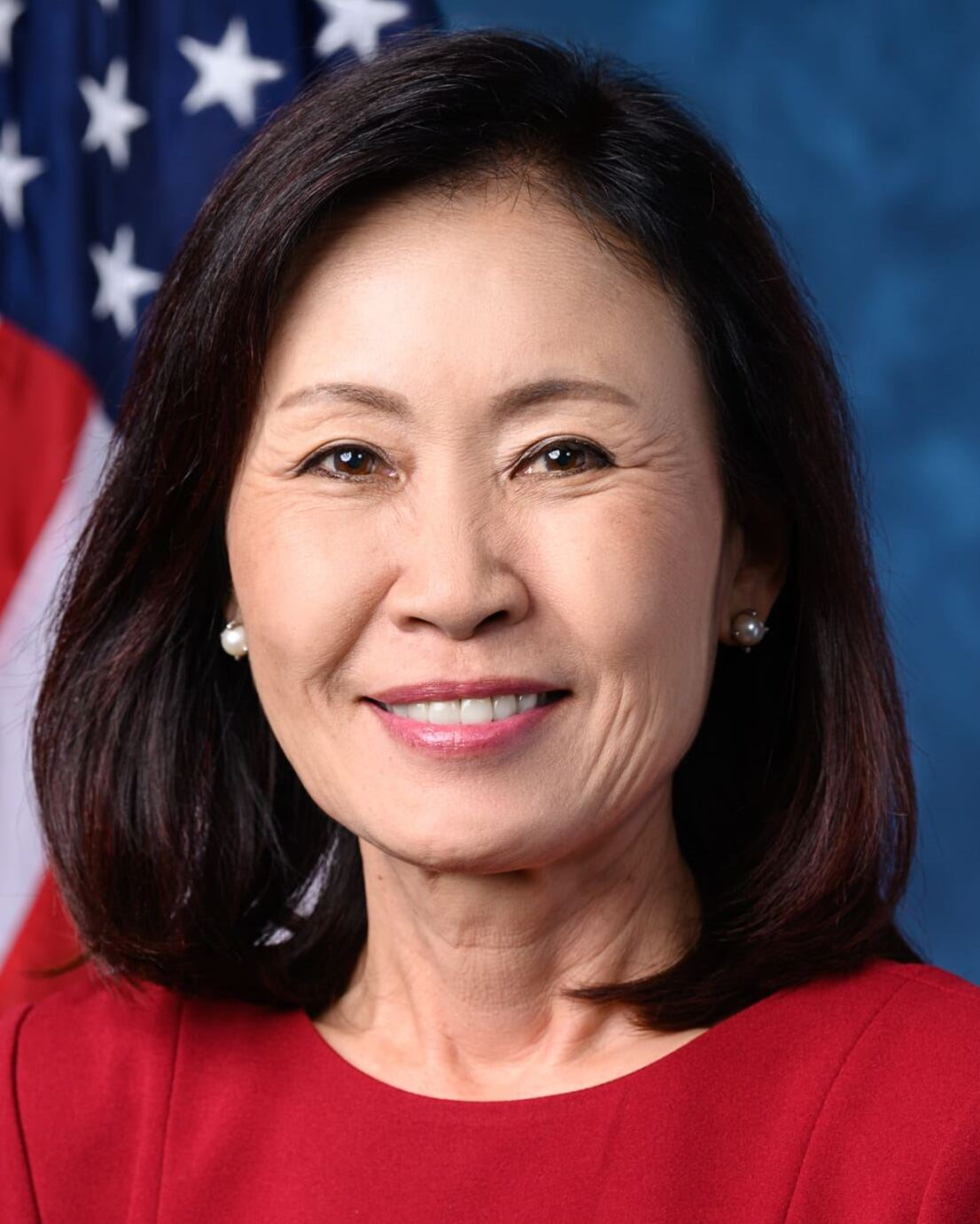

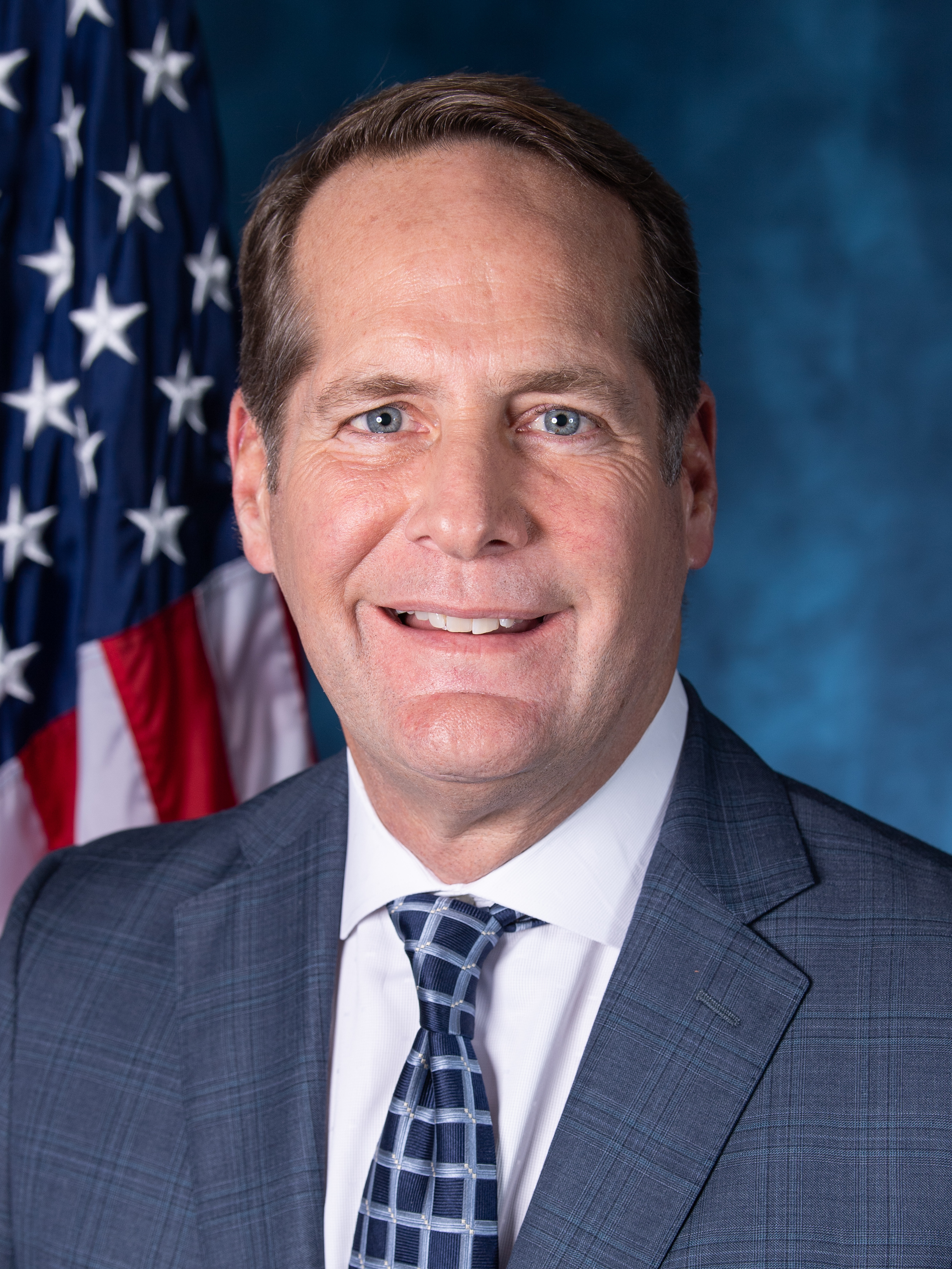
Candidate	Michelle Steel	Harley Rouda
Party	Republican	Democratic
Popular vote	201,738	193,362
Percentage	51.1%	48.9%
- County results Steel: 50–60%
U.S. Representative before election
Harley Rouda
Democratic
Elected U.S. Representative
Michelle Steel
Republican

The 48th district encompasses coastal Orange County, taking in Seal Beach, Sunset Beach, Huntington Beach, Midway City, Fountain Valley, Costa Mesa, Newport Beach, Laguna Beach, Aliso Viejo, and Laguna Niguel, as well as parts of Westminster and Garden Grove. The incumbent was Democrat Harley Rouda, who flipped the district and was elected with 53.6% of the vote in 2018.

=== Candidates ===
==== Advanced to general ====
- Harley Rouda (Democratic), incumbent U.S. representative
- Michelle Steel (Republican), Orange County Chair supervisor

==== Eliminated in primary ====
- Brian Burley (Republican), information technology entrepreneur
- Christopher Engels (Republican), businessman
- James Brian Griffin (Republican), real estate broker
- Richard Mata (American Independent), retired teacher
- John Thomas Schuesler (Republican), mortgage consultant

==== Withdrew ====
- James Bradley (Republican), businessman and candidate for U.S. Senate in 2018 (running for California's 33rd congressional district)

==== Declined ====
- Scott Baugh (Republican), former chair of the Orange County Republican Party and candidate for California's 48th congressional district in 2018
- Janet Nguyen (Republican), former state senator

=== Endorsements ===
Harley Rouda (D)

Former U.S. executive branch officials

- Barack Obama, former president of the United States (2009–2017), former senator from Illinois (2005–2008)

Labor unions

- Service Employees International Union California

Organizations

- Asian American Action Fund
- California League of Conservation Voters
- Council for a Livable World
- End Citizens United
- Human Rights Campaign
- League of Conservation Voters Action Fund
- Planned Parenthood Action Fund
- Sierra Club
Michelle Steel (R)

Politicians

- Newt Gingrich, former U.S. Representative (GA-6) and former Speaker of the House

Organizations

- Maggie's List
- New York Young Republican Club
- Susan B. Anthony List

=== Predictions ===
Source	Ranking	As of
The Cook Political Report	Lean D	July 2, 2020
Inside Elections	Lean D	June 2, 2020
Sabato's Crystal Ball	Lean D	July 2, 2020
Politico	Lean D	November 2, 2020
Daily Kos	Lean D	June 3, 2020
RCP	Lean D	June 9, 2020
Niskanen	Likely D	June 7, 2020

=== Polling ===
==== Primary election ====
Poll source	Date(s) administered	Sample size	Margin of error	Brian Burley (R)	Harley Rouda (D)	Michelle Steel (R)	Undecided
Point Blank Political (R) (Note: Poll sponsored by Burleys's campaign)	January 24, 2020	360 (LV)	± 5.3%	50%	23%	7%	20%
Point Blank Political (R)	December 17, 2019	474 (LV)	± 5.4%	54%	18%	7%	20%

==== General election ====
Poll source	Date(s) administered	Sample size	Margin of error	Harley Rouda (D)	Michelle Steel (R)	Undecided
TargetPoint (R)	September 4, 2019	336 (LV)	± 5.3%	42%	42%	16%

Hypothetical polling

with Brian Burley

Poll source	Date(s) administered	Sample size	Margin of error	Brian Burley (R)	Harley Rouda (D)	Undecided
Point Blank Political (R)	January 24, 2020	360 (LV)	± 5.3%	65%	23%	12%
Point Blank Political (R)	December 17, 2019	474 (LV)	± 5.4%	66%	19%	15%

with Generic Opponent

Poll source	Date(s) administered	Sample size	Margin of error	Harley Rouda (D)	Generic Opponent	Undecided
TargetPoint (R)	September 4, 2019	336 (LV)	± 5.3%	28%	42% (Note: "Want to give someone else a chance" with 42% as opposed to "want to re-elect Rouda")	–

=== Results ===
2020 California's 48th congressional district primary results by county supervisorial district Map legend: Rouda—50–60%; Rouda—40–50%

California's 48th congressional district, 2020
Primary election
Party	Candidate	Votes	%
Democratic	Harley Rouda (incumbent)	99,659	46.7
Republican	Michelle Steel	74,418	34.9
Republican	Brian Burley	25,884	12.1
American Independent	Richard Mata	5,704	2.7
Republican	John Thomas Schuesler	4,900	2.3
Republican	James Brian Griffin	2,714	1.3
Total votes		213,279	100.0
General election
Republican	Michelle Steel	201,738	51.1
Democratic	Harley Rouda (incumbent)	193,362	48.9
Total votes		395,100	100.0
Republican gain from Democratic			

== District 49 ==
2020 California's 49th congressional district election
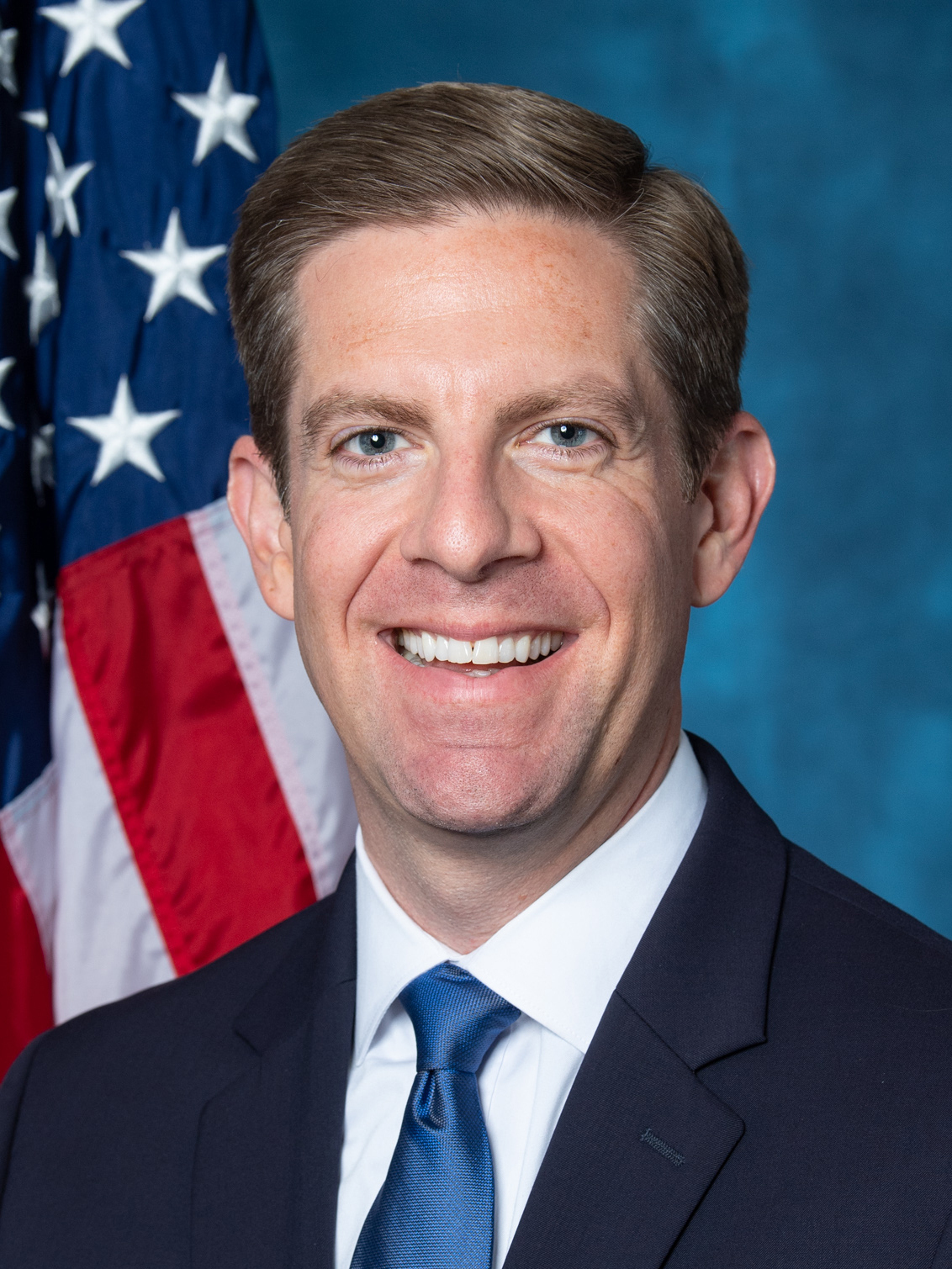

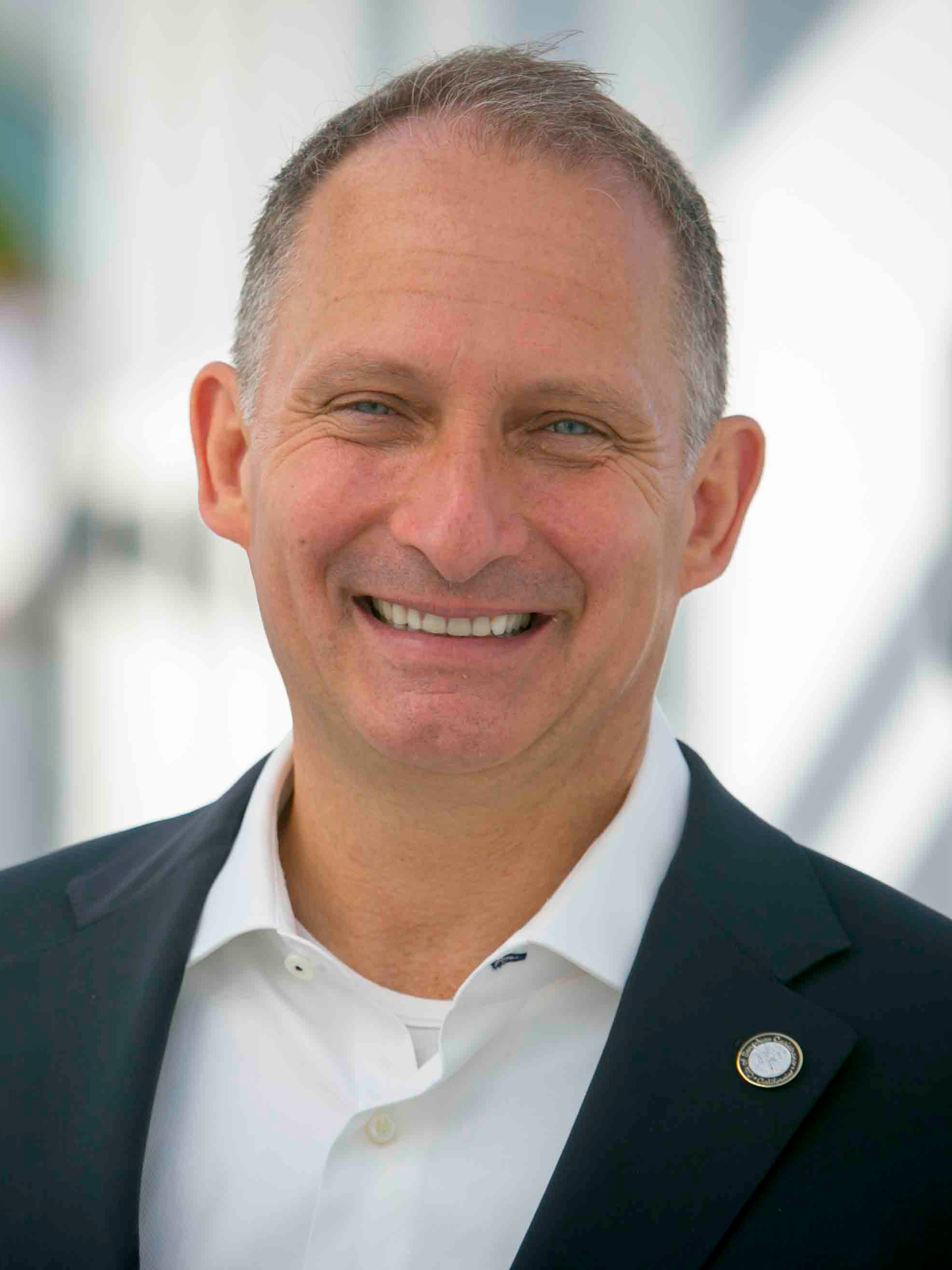
Candidate	Mike Levin	Brian Maryott
Party	Democratic	Republican
Popular vote	205,349	181,157
Percentage	53.1%	46.9%
- County results Levin: 50–60% Maryott: 50–60%
U.S. Representative before election
Mike Levin
Democratic
Elected U.S. Representative
Mike Levin
Democratic

The 49th district encompasses the northern coastal areas of San Diego County, including the cities of Oceanside, Vista, Carlsbad, and Encinitas, as well as a small part of southern Orange County, taking in Dana Point, Ladera Ranch, San Clemente, and San Juan Capistrano. The incumbent was Democrat Mike Levin, who flipped the district and was elected with 56.4% of the vote in 2018.

=== Candidates ===
==== Advanced to general ====
- Mike Levin (Democratic), incumbent U.S. representative
- Brian Maryott (Republican), San Juan Capistrano councilman, former mayor of San Juan Capistrano, and candidate for California's 49th congressional district in 2018

==== Declined ====
- Kristin Gaspar (Republican), San Diego County supervisor, former mayor of Encinitas, and candidate for California's 49th congressional district in 2018

=== Predictions ===
Source	Ranking	As of
The Cook Political Report	Safe D	July 2, 2020
Inside Elections	Safe D	June 2, 2020
Sabato's Crystal Ball	Safe D	July 2, 2020
Politico	Likely D	April 19, 2020
Daily Kos	Safe D	June 3, 2020
RCP	Safe D	June 9, 2020
Niskanen	Safe D	June 7, 2020

=== Polling ===
==== General election ====
Poll source	Date(s) administered	Sample size	Margin of error	Mike Levin (D)	Brian Maryott (R)	Undecided
SurveyUSA	October 8–12, 2020	514 (LV)	± 5.8%	56%	36%	7%
SurveyUSA	September 11–14, 2020	517 (LV)	± 5.8%	49%	37%	14%

=== Results ===
2020 California's 49th congressional district primary results by county Map legend: Levin—60–70%; Maryott—50–60%

California's 49th congressional district, 2020
Primary election
Party	Candidate	Votes	%
Democratic	Mike Levin (incumbent)	125,639	56.6
Republican	Brian Maryott	96,424	43.4
Total votes		222,063	100.0
General election
Democratic	Mike Levin (incumbent)	205,349	53.1
Republican	Brian Maryott	181,157	46.9
Total votes		386,506	100.0
Democratic hold			

== District 50 ==
2020 California's 50th congressional district election
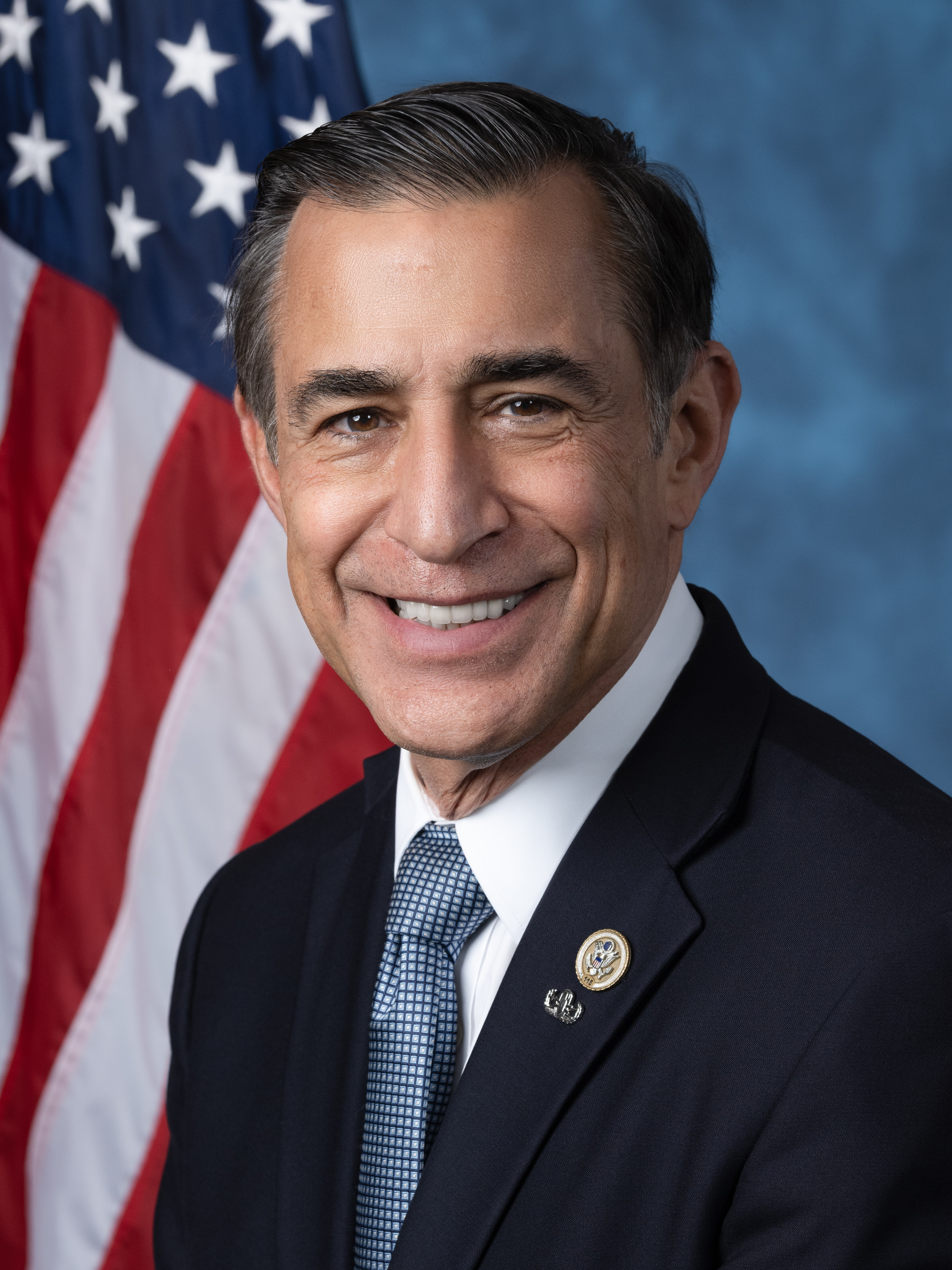

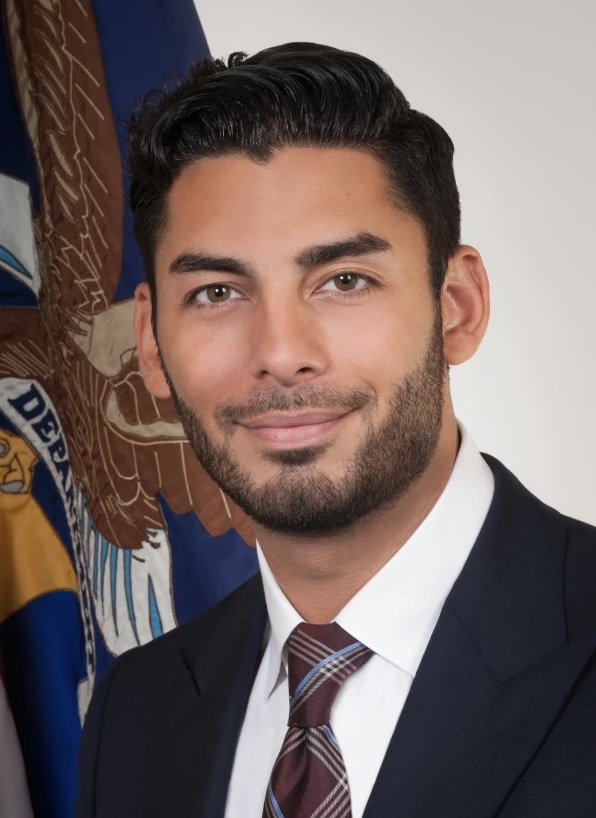
Candidate	Darrell Issa	Ammar Campa-Najjar
Party	Republican	Democratic
Popular vote	195,510	166,859
Percentage	54.0%	46.0%
- County results Issa: 50–60%
U.S. Representative before election
Duncan D. Hunter
Republican
Elected U.S. Representative
Darrell Issa
Republican

The 50th district covers inland San Diego County consisting of suburban and outlying areas of the county, including Fallbrook, San Marcos, Valley Center, Ramona, Escondido, Santee, Lakeside, parts of El Cajon and a slice of southwestern Riverside County, taking in parts of Temecula. The incumbent was Republican Duncan D. Hunter, who was re-elected with 51.7% of the vote in 2018. On December 3, 2019, Hunter pleaded to guilty to campaign finance violations and resigned from office effective January 13, 2020.

=== Candidates ===
==== Advanced to general ====
- Ammar Campa-Najjar (Democratic), former Department of Labor official and candidate for California's 50th congressional district in 2018
- Darrell Issa (Republican), former U.S. Representative for California's 49th congressional district

==== Eliminated in primary ====
- José Cortés (Peace and Freedom), community organizer
- Carl DeMaio (Republican), former San Diego city councilman and candidate for California's 52nd congressional district in 2014
- Helen L. Horvath (no party preference), psychologist
- Lucinda KWH Jahn (no party preference), entertainment industry professional
- Brian W. Jones (Republican), state senator
- Henry Alan Ota (no party preference), farmer
- Nathan "Nate" Wilkins (Republican), retired U.S. Navy SEAL

==== Withdrew ====
- Sam Abed (Republican), former mayor of Escondido
- Alex Balkin (Democratic), former U.S. Navy Inspector General
- Marisa Calderon (Democratic), executive director of the National Association of Hispanic Real Estate Professionals
- Duncan D. Hunter (Republican), former U.S. representative
- Bill Wells (Republican), mayor of El Cajon and candidate for California's 50th congressional district in 2018
- Larry Wilske (Republican), retired Navy SEAL

==== Declined ====
- Joel Anderson (Republican), former state senator
- Matt Rahn (Republican), Temecula city councilman and former mayor of Temecula

=== Endorsements ===
Ammar Campa-Najjar (Democratic)

Executive branch officials

- Joe Biden, 47th vice president of the United States; president of the United States
- John Howard Dalton, former U.S. secretary of the Navy 1993–1998
- Barack Obama, former president of the United States (2009–2017, former senator from Illinois (2005–2008)

Federal politicians

- Tony Cárdenas, U.S. representative from CA-29 since 2013
- Susan Davis, U.S. representative from CA-49 2001–2003 and CA-53 since 2003
- Katie Hill, former U.S. representative from CA-25 2019–2019
- Jared Huffman, U.S. representative from CA-02 since 2013
- Barbara Lee, U.S. representative from CA-09 1998–2013 and CA-13 since 2013
- Mike Levin, U.S. representative from CA-49 since 2019
- Scott Peters, U.S. representative from CA-52 since 2013
- Katie Porter, U.S. representative from CA-45 since 2019
- Adam Schiff, U.S. representative from CA-27 2001–2003, CA-29 2003–2013, and CA-28 since 2013; Chair of the House Intelligence Committee since 2019
- Eric Swalwell, U.S. representative from CA-15 since 2013; candidate for president in 2020
- Juan Vargas, U.S. representative from CA-51 since 2013

State politicians

- Lorena Gonzalez, California Assemblywoman from District 80 since 2013
- Betty Yee, Controller of California since 2015

Local politicians

- Nathan Fletcher, member of the San Diego County Board of Supervisors from District 4 since 2019
- Georgette Gomez, San Diego City Councilwoman from District 9 since 2016; President of the San Diego City Council since 2018

Organizations

- California Labor Federation
- California League of Conservation Voters
- California Teachers Association
- Democracy for America
- End Citizens United
- Equality California
- Planned Parenthood
- Service Employees International Union
- Sierra Club
Darrell Issa (Republican)

Federal politicians

- Ken Calvert, U.S. representative from CA-42 2013–present, CA-44 2003–2013, CA-43 1993–2003
- Paul Cook, U.S. representative from CA-8
- Newt Gingrich, former Speaker of the United States House of Representatives and U.S. representative from GA-6
- Mike Huckabee, former governor of Arkansas
- Duncan Hunter, former U.S. representative from CA-42 1981–1983, CA-45 1983–1993, and CA-52 1993–2009; candidate for president in 2008; father of incumbent Duncan D. Hunter
- Doug LaMalfa, U.S. representative from CA-1
- Kevin McCarthy, House minority leader, U.S. representative from CA-23 2013–present, CA-22 2007–2013
- Tom McClintock, U.S. representative from CA-4
- Devin Nunes, U.S. representative from CA-22 2013–present, CA-21 2003–2013
- Tim Scott, United States Senator from South Carolina
- Donald Trump, President of the United States

State and local politicians

- Kevin Faulconer, mayor of San Diego

=== Predictions ===
Source	Ranking	As of
The Cook Political Report	Lean R	October 21, 2020
Inside Elections	Likely R	October 16, 2020
Sabato's Crystal Ball	Likely R	September 2, 2020
Politico	Lean R	April 19, 2020
Daily Kos	Safe R	June 3, 2020
RCP	Likely R	June 9, 2020
Niskanen	Safe R	June 7, 2020

=== Polling ===
==== Primary election ====
Poll source	Date(s) administered	Sample size	Margin of error	Ammar Campa-Najjar (D)	Carl DeMaio (R)	Darrell Issa (R)	Brian Jones (R)	Other	Undecided
Remington Research Group (R) (Note: Poll sponsored by DeMaio's campaign)	February 22–23, 2020	1,009 (LV)	± 3%	44%	22%	17%	13%	1%	3%
SurveyUSA	February 20–23, 2020	552 (LV)	± 5.2%	35%	15%	21%	7%	9% (Note: Marisa Calderon with 5%; Nathan Wilkins with 3%; Helen Horvath with 1%; Jose Cortes, Lucinda Jahn and Henry Ota with 0%)	12%
SurveyUSA	January 9–12, 2020	512 (LV)	± 5.7%	26%	20%	21%	12%	5% (Note: Marisa Calderon (D) with 3%; Helen Horvath (NPP) and Nathan Wilkins (R) with 1% each; José Cortés (Peace and Freedom); Lucinda Jahn (NPP) and Henry Ota (NPP) with 0% each)	15%
TP Research	September 26 – October 2, 2019	692 (LV)	± 4%	21% (Note: Standard VI response)	33%	31%	–	–	15%
TP Research	September 26 – October 2, 2019	692 (LV)	± 4%	24% (Note: Response after pollsters address respondents with talking points about Campa-Najjar, DeMaio and Issa)	29%	37%	–	–	9%
Tarrance Group (R)	June 24–26, 2019	302 (LV)	± 5.8%	37%	34%	–	–	15% (Note: "Sam Abed, Joel Anderson, Brian Jones, Matt Rahn, Bill Wells and Larry Wilske" with 15%)	13%
Tarrance Group (R)	June 24–26, 2019	302 (LV)	± 5.8%	40% (Note: Response after pollsters address respondents with talking points about DeMaio and Issa)	41%	–	–	12% (Note: "Sam Abed, Joel Anderson, Brian Jones, Matt Rahn, Bill Wells and Larry Wilske" with 12%)	7%
Tarrance Group (R)	June 24–26, 2019	302 (LV)	± 5.8%	37%	28%	20%	–	4% (Note: "Sam Abed, Joel Anderson, Brian Jones, Matt Rahn, Bill Wells and Larry Wilske" with 4%)	11%
Tarrance Group (R)	June 24–26, 2019	302 (LV)	± 5.8%	39%	35%	13%	–	2% (Note: "Sam Abed, Joel Anderson, Brian Jones, Matt Rahn, Bill Wells and Larry Wilske" with 2%)	10%

Hypothetical polling

with Duncan Hunter

Poll source	Date(s) administered	Sample size	Margin of error	Ammar Campa-Najjar (D)	Carl DeMaio (R)	Duncan Hunter (R)	Darrell Issa (R)	Brian Jones (R)	Other	Undecided
Public Opinion Strategies (R) (Note: Poll sponsored by Darrell Issa's campaign)	November 18–20, 2019	400 (LV)	± 4.9%	31%	19%	9%	21%	–	–	12%
SurveyUSA/KGTV-TV	September 27 – October 2, 2019	592 (LV)	± 4.9%	31%	20%	11%	16%	4%	3% (Note: Helen Horvath (NPP) with 2%, David Edick Jr (NPP) with 1%)	15%
Tarrance Group (R)	June 24–26, 2020	302 (LV)	± 5.8%	36%	24%	27%	–	–	7% (Note: "Sam Abed, Joel Anderson, Brian Jones, Matt Rahn, Bill Wells and Larry Wilske" with 7%)	12%
Tarrance Group (R)	June 24–26, 2020	302 (LV)	± 5.8%	39%	36%	10%	–	–	6% (Note: "Sam Abed, Joel Anderson, Brian Jones, Matt Rahn, Bill Wells and Larry Wilske" with 6%)	9%

==== General election ====
Poll source	Date(s) administered	Sample size	Margin of error	Darrell Issa (R)	Ammar Campa-Najjar (D)	Other	Undecided
SurveyUSA	October 22–27, 2020	538 (LV)	± 5.7%	51%	40%	–	9%
Strategies 360 (D) (Note: Poll sponsored by Campa-Najjar's campaign)	October 10–13, 2020	401 (LV)	± 4.9%	42%	42%	3% (Note: "Refused" with 3%)	13%
Strategies 360 (D)	September, 2020	– (V)	–	49%	46%	– (Note: "Refused" with no voters)	5%
SurveyUSA	September 4–7, 2020	508 (LV)	± 5.4%	46%	45%	–	9%
Strategies 360 (D)	July 22–26, 2020	400 (LV)	± 4.9%	47%	43%	–	10%
Strategies 360 (D)	March 18–21, 2020	400 (LV)	± 4.9%	48%	45%	–	–

Hypothetical polling

with DeMaio and Issa

Poll source	Date(s) administered	Sample size	Margin of error	Carl DeMaio (R)	Darrell Issa (R)	Other	Undecided
TP Research	September 26 – October 2, 2019	692 (LV)	± 4%	29%	36%	–	35%

with Generic Republican and Generic Democrat

Poll source	Date(s) administered	Sample size	Margin of error	Generic Republican	Generic Democrat
Public Opinion Strategies	November 18–20, 2019	400 (LV)	± 4.9%	47%	37%

=== Results ===
2020 California's 50th congressional district primary results by county Map legend: Campa-Najjar—30–40%

California's 50th congressional district, 2020
Primary election
Party	Candidate	Votes	%
Democratic	Ammar Campa-Najjar	74,121	36.5
Republican	Darrell Issa	47,036	23.1
Republican	Carl DeMaio	40,347	19.9
Republican	Brian W. Jones	21,495	10.6
Democratic	Marisa Calderon	11,557	5.7
Republican	Nathan "Nate" Wilkins	4,276	2.1
Peace and Freedom	Jose Cortes	1,821	0.9
No Party Preference	Helen L. Horvath	1,249	0.6
No Party Preference	Henry Alan Ota	908	0.4
No Party Preference	Lucinda KWH Jahn	410	0.2
Total votes		203,220	100.0
General election
Republican	Darrell Issa	195,521	54.0
Democratic	Ammar Campa-Najjar	166,869	46.0
Total votes		362,390	100.0
Republican hold			

== District 51 ==
2020 California's 51st congressional district election
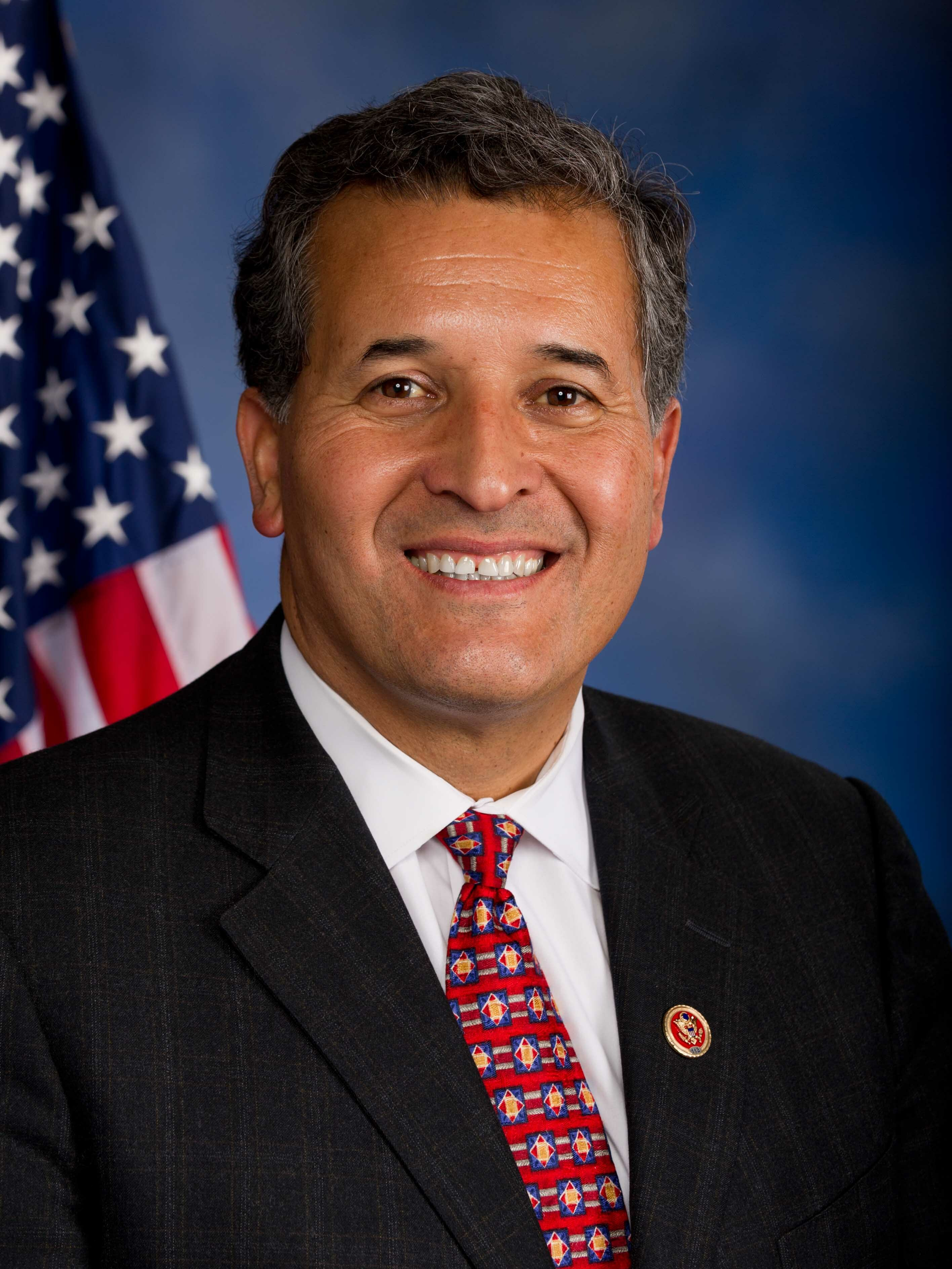

Candidate	Juan Vargas	Juan Hidalgo Jr.
Party	Democratic	Republican
Popular vote	165,596	76,841
Percentage	68.3%	31.7%
- County results Vargas: 60–70%
U.S. Representative before election
Juan Vargas
Democratic
Elected U.S. Representative
Juan Vargas
Democratic

The 51st district runs along the border with Mexico and includes Imperial County and southern San Diego, including western Chula Vista, Imperial Beach, and National City. The incumbent was Democrat Juan Vargas, who was re-elected with 71.2% of the vote in 2018.

=== Candidates ===
==== Advanced to general ====
- Juan Hidalgo Jr. (Republican), U.S. Marine Corps veteran and candidate for California's 51st congressional district in 2016 & 2018
- Juan Vargas (Democratic), incumbent U.S. representative

=== Endorsements ===
Juan Hidalgo Jr. (R)

Organizations

- Combat Veterans for Congress
Juan Vargas (D)

Organizations

- California League of Conservation Voters
- California Teachers Association
- Human Rights Campaign
- Planned Parenthood Action Fund
- Sierra Club

=== Predictions ===
Source	Ranking	As of
The Cook Political Report	Safe D	July 2, 2020
Inside Elections	Safe D	June 2, 2020
Sabato's Crystal Ball	Safe D	July 2, 2020
Politico	Safe D	April 19, 2020
Daily Kos	Safe D	June 3, 2020
RCP	Safe D	June 9, 2020
Niskanen	Safe D	June 7, 2020

=== Results ===
2020 California's 51st congressional district primary results by county Map legend: Vargas—70–80%; Vargas—60–70%

California's 51st congressional district, 2020
Primary election
Party	Candidate	Votes	%
Democratic	Juan C. Vargas (incumbent)	77,744	71.4
Republican	Juan M. Hidalgo Jr.	31,209	28.6
Total votes		108,953	100.0
General election
Democratic	Juan C. Vargas (incumbent)	165,596	68.3
Republican	Juan M. Hidalgo Jr.	76,841	31.7
Total votes		242,437	100.0
Democratic hold			

== District 52 ==
2020 California's 52nd congressional district election
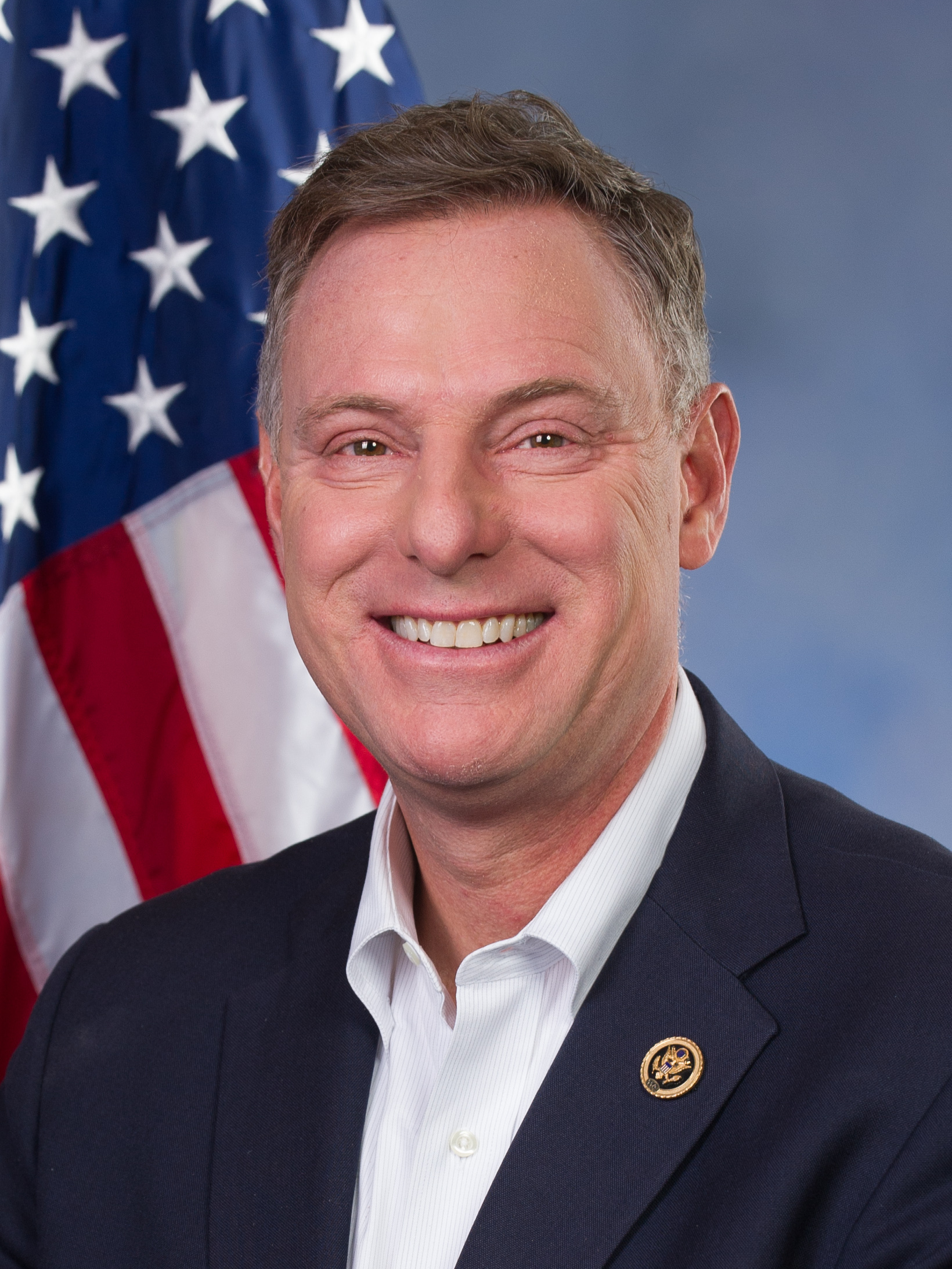

Candidate	Scott Peters	Jim DeBello
Party	Democratic	Republican
Popular vote	244,145	152,350
Percentage	61.6%	38.4%
- County results Peters: 60–70%
U.S. Representative before election
Scott Peters
Democratic
Elected U.S. Representative
Scott Peters
Democratic

The 52nd district is based in San Diego County, including coastal and central portions of the city of San Diego in addition to Carmel Valley, La Jolla, Point Loma, downtown San Diego, and the suburbs of Poway and Coronado. The incumbent was Democrat Scott Peters, who was re-elected with 63.8% of the vote in 2018.

=== Candidates ===
==== Advanced to general ====
- Jim DeBello (Republican), former CEO of Mitek Systems
- Scott Peters (Democratic), incumbent U.S. representative

==== Eliminated in primary ====
- Nancy L. Casady (Democratic), California Department of Food and Agriculture board member
- Ryan Cunningham (no party preference), public finance banker

=== Predictions ===
Source	Ranking	As of
The Cook Political Report	Safe D	July 2, 2020
Inside Elections	Safe D	June 2, 2020
Sabato's Crystal Ball	Safe D	July 2, 2020
Politico	Safe D	April 19, 2020
Daily Kos	Safe D	June 3, 2020
RCP	Safe D	June 9, 2020
Niskanen	Safe D	June 7, 2020

=== Results ===
California's 52nd congressional district, 2020
Primary election
Party	Candidate	Votes	%
Democratic	Scott Peters (incumbent)	111,897	49.1
Republican	Jim DeBello	73,779	32.4
Democratic	Nancy L. Casady	36,422	16.0
No party preference	Ryan Cunningham	5,701	2.5
Total votes		227,799	100.0
General election
Democratic	Scott Peters (incumbent)	244,145	61.6
Republican	Jim DeBello	152,350	38.4
Total votes		396,495	100.0
Democratic hold			

== District 53 ==
2020 California's 53rd congressional district election
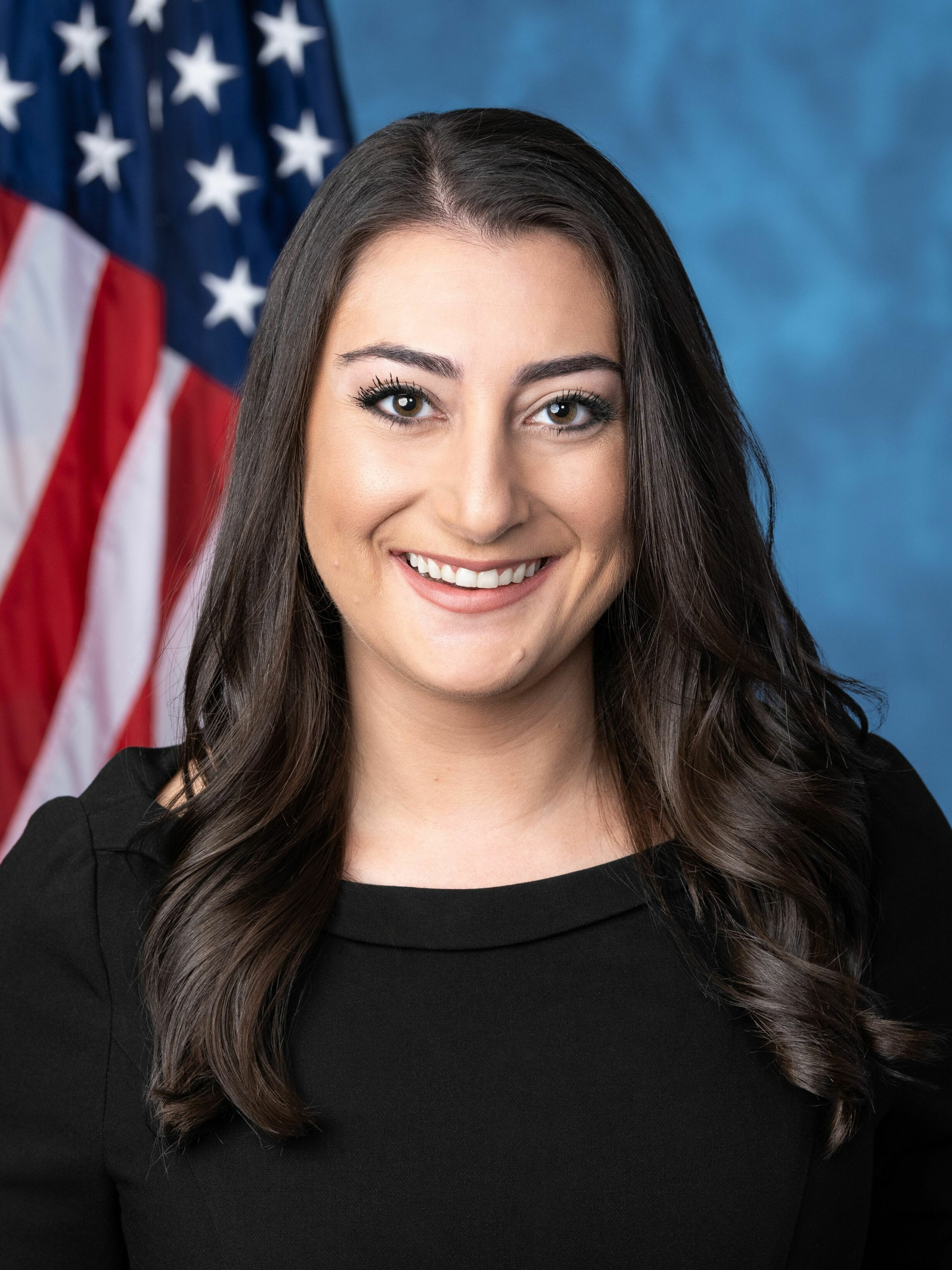

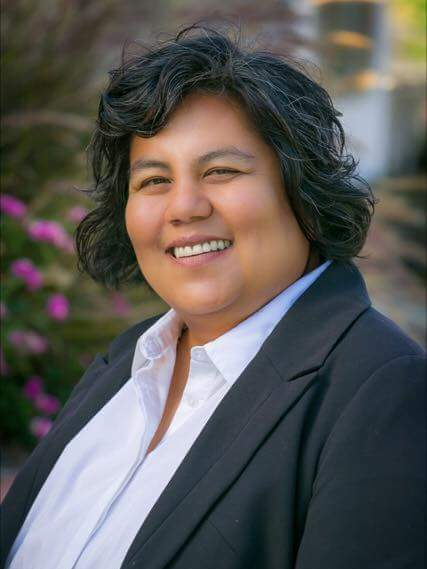
Candidate	Sara Jacobs	Georgette Gómez
Party	Democratic	Democratic
Popular vote	199,244	135,614
Percentage	59.5%	40.5%
U.S. Representative before election
Susan Davis
Democratic
Elected U.S. Representative
Sara Jacobs
Democratic

The 53rd district encompasses eastern San Diego and its eastern suburbs, including, eastern Chula Vista, western El Cajon, Bonita, La Mesa, Lemon Grove, and Spring Valley. The incumbent was Democrat Susan Davis, who was re-elected with 69.1% of the vote in 2018. On September 4, 2019, Davis announced she would not seek re-election.

=== Candidates ===
==== Advanced to general ====
- Georgette Gómez (Democratic), president of the San Diego City Council
- Sara Jacobs (Democratic), candidate for California's 49th congressional district in 2018, policy advisor for the Hillary Clinton 2016 presidential campaign, and granddaughter of Qualcomm founder Irwin Jacobs

==== Eliminated in primary ====
- John Brooks (Democratic), biologist
- Jose Caballero (Democratic), political consultant
- Joseph R. Fountain (Democratic), special education teacher
- Fernando Garcia (no party preference), businessman
- Janessa Goldbeck (Democratic), human rights activist and U.S. Marine veteran
- Eric Roger Kutner (Democratic), policy advisor
- Annette Meza (Democratic), educator
- Michael Patrick Oristian (Republican), software developer
- Famela Ramos (Republican), nurse
- Suzette Santori (Democratic), ride-share driver
- Chris Stoddard (Republican), realtor
- Joaquín Vazquez (Democratic), community advocate
- Tom Wong (Democratic), political science professor at UC San Diego

==== Declined ====
- Toni Atkins (Democratic), president pro tempore of the California State Senate (endorsed Gomez)
- Susan Davis (Democratic), incumbent U.S. representative
- Nathan Fletcher (Democratic), San Diego County supervisor and former state representative (endorsed Gomez)
- Todd Gloria (Democratic), state assemblyman (running for mayor of San Diego, endorsed Gomez)
- Lorena Gonzalez (Democratic), state assemblywoman (endorsed Gomez)
- Morgan Murtaugh (Republican), former OAN political commentator and candidate for California's 53rd congressional district in 2018 (endorsed Jacobs)

==== Endorsements ====
Georgette Gómez (D)

U.S. senators

- Catherine Cortez Masto (D-NV)
- Bernie Sanders (I-VT), 2020 Democratic presidential candidate
- Elizabeth Warren (D-MA), 2020 Democratic presidential candidate

U.S. representatives

- Pete Aguilar, Representative from CA-31
- Nanette Barragán, Representative from CA-44
- Salud Carbajal, Representative from CA-24
- Tony Cardenas, Representative from CA-29
- David Cicilline, Representative from RI-1
- Lou Correa, Representative from CA-46
- Pramila Jayapal, Representative from WA-7
- Ro Khanna, Representative from CA-17
- Alan Lowenthal, Representative from CA-47
- Alexandria Ocasio-Cortez, Representative from NY-14
- Mark Pocan, Representative from WI-2
- Jamie Raskin, Representative from MD-8
- Mark Takano, Representative from CA-41
- Juan Vargas, Representative from CA-51
- Maxine Waters, Representative from CA-43

State officials

- John Chiang, former California State Treasurer and former California State Controller
- Fiona Ma, current California State Treasurer
- Betty Yee, current California State Controller

State legislators

- Toni Atkins, President pro tempore of the California State Senate and state senator from SD-39
- Willie Brown, former Speaker of the California State Assembly and former mayor of San Francisco
- Kevin de León, former President pro tempore of the California State Senate
- Todd Gloria, State Assemblyman from SA-78
- Lorena Gonzalez, State Assemblywomen from SA-80
- Tasha Boerner Horvath, State Assemblywomen from SA-76
- Ben Hueso, state senator from SD-40
- Christine Kehoe, former state senator from SD-39
- Anthony Rendon, Speaker of the California State Assembly and State Assemblyman from SA-63
- Shirley Weber, State Assemblywomen from SA-79
- Scott Wiener, state senator from SD-11

Local officials

- David Alvarez, former member of the San Diego City Council
- Barbara Bry, member of the San Diego City Council
- Serge Dedina, current mayor of Imperial Beach
- Mara Elliott, San Diego City Attorney
- Nathan Fletcher, San Diego County Supervisor and former State Assemblyman
- Robert Garcia, current mayor of Long Beach
- Jim Madaffer, former member of the San Diego City Council, current chair of the San Diego County Water Authority, and current commissioner on the California Transportation Commission
- Monica Montgomery, member of the San Diego City Council
- Steve Padilla, former mayor of Chula Vista
- Mary Salas, current mayor of Chula Vista and former State Assemblywomen

Organizations

- BOLD PAC
- California Democratic Party
- California League of Conservation Voters
- Congressional Progressive Caucus
- Democratic Majority For Israel (DMFI PAC)
- Equality California
- Equality PAC
- Human Rights Campaign
- Justice Democrats
- LGBTQ Victory Fund
- Our Revolution
- Progressive Change Campaign Committee
- Sierra Club

Labor unions

- AFSCME
- AFT California
- Laborers' International Union of North America San Diego
- National Education Association
- National Union of Healthcare Workers
- Southwest Regional Council of Carpenters
- UNITE HERE

Others

- Dolores Huerta, labor leader and co-founder of the National Farm Workers Association
- Mondaire Jones, 2020 Democratic nominee for New York's 17th congressional district
Sara Jacobs (D)

U.S. representatives

- Colin Allred, representative from TX-32
- Ami Bera, representative from CA-07
- TJ Cox, representative from CA-21
- Abby Finkenauer, representative from IA-01
- Lois Frankel, representative from FL-21
- Andy Kim, representative from NJ-03
- Katie Porter, representative from CA-45
- Harley Rouda, representative from CA-48
- Eric Swalwell, representative from CA-15

State officials

- Eleni Kounalakis, Lieutenant Governor of California
- Jared Polis, Governor of Colorado

Newspapers

- San Diego Union-Tribune

Organizations

- Common Defense
- Council for a Livable World
- Foreign Policy for America

=== Predictions ===
Source	Ranking	As of
The Cook Political Report	Safe D	July 2, 2020
Inside Elections	Safe D	June 2, 2020
Sabato's Crystal Ball	Safe D	July 2, 2020
Politico	Safe D	April 19, 2020
Daily Kos	Safe D	June 3, 2020
RCP	Safe D	June 9, 2020
Niskanen	Safe D	June 7, 2020

=== Polling ===
==== Primary election ====
Poll source	Date(s) administered	Sample size	Margin of error	Georgette Gómez (D)	Sara Jacobs (D)	Famela Ramos (R)	Chris Stoddard (R)	Other / Undecided
SurveyUSA	January 30 – February 2, 2020	513 (LV)	± 5.7%	5%	23%	5%	10%	57% (Note: Joaquin Vazquez (D) with 4%; José Caballero (D) and Michael Oristian (R) with 3% each; Annette Meza (D), Suzette Santori (D), Jessica Goldbeck (D), Eric Kutner (D), and Fernando Garcia (NPP) with 2% each; John Brooks (D) and Joseph Fountain (D) with 1% each; Undecided with 35%)

==== General election ====
Poll source	Date(s) administered	Sample size	Margin of error	Georgette Gomez (D)	Sara Jacobs (D)	Undecided
SurveyUSA	October 15–18, 2020	511 (LV)	± 5.6%	27%	40%	33%
SurveyUSA	September 18–21, 2020	534 (LV)	± 5.8%	24%	38%	38%
RMG Research	July 27 – August 2, 2020	500 (RV)	± 4.5%	17%	32%	51%

=== Results ===
California's 53rd congressional district, 2020
Primary election
Party	Candidate	Votes	%
Democratic	Sara Jacobs	58,312	29.1
Democratic	Georgette Gómez	39,962	20.0
Republican	Chris Stoddard	25,962	13.0
Democratic	Janessa Goldbeck	17,041	8.5
Republican	Famela Ramos	15,005	7.5
Republican	Michael Patrick Oristian	14,807	7.4
Democratic	Tom Wong	7,265	3.6
Democratic	Annette Meza	4,446	2.2
Democratic	Joseph R. Fountain	4,041	2.0
Democratic	Jose Caballero	3,226	1.6
Democratic	Joaquín Vazquez	3,078	1.5
Democratic	John Brooks	2,820	1.4
No party preference	Fernando Garcia	1,832	0.9
Democratic	Suzette Santori	1,625	0.8
Democratic	Eric Roger Kutner	734	0.4
Total votes		200,156	100.0
General election
Democratic	Sara Jacobs	199,244	59.5
Democratic	Georgette Gómez	135,614	40.5
Total votes		334,858	100.0
Democratic hold			

== Notes ==
Party ballot access

Partisan clients

Additional candidates
