= 2020 United States House of Representatives election ratings =

Predictions for select races in the 2020 U.S. House elections

The 2020 United States House of Representatives elections were held November 3, 2020, to elect representatives from all 435 congressional districts across each of the 50 U.S. states. The six non-voting delegates from the District of Columbia and the inhabited U.S. territories were also elected. Numerous federal, state, and local elections, including the 2020 presidential election and the 2020 Senate elections, were also held on this date.

== Election ratings ==
=== Latest published ratings for competitive seats ===
Several sites and individuals publish ratings of competitive seats. The seats listed below were considered competitive (not "safe" or "solid") by at least one of the rating groups. These ratings are based upon factors such as the strength of the incumbent (if the incumbent is running for re-election), the strength of the candidates, and the partisan history of the district (the Cook Partisan Voting Index is one example of this metric). Each rating describes the likelihood of a given outcome in the election.

Most election ratings use:

- Tossup: no advantage
- Tilt (sometimes used): slight advantage
- Lean: clear advantage
- Likely: strong, but not certain advantage
- Safe: outcome is nearly certain

District	CPVI	Incumbent	Last result	Cook Nov 2, 2020	IE Oct 28, 2020	Sabato Nov 2, 2020	Daily Kos Nov 2, 2020	RCP Nov 2, 2020	DDHQ Nov 3, 2020	538 (Note: Represents the Deluxe model) Nov 3, 2020	ED Nov 1, 2020	Winner
Alaska at-large	R+9	Don Young (R)	53.1% R	Lean R	Likely R	Lean R	Lean R	Likely R	Lean R	Likely R	Lean R	Don Young (R)
Arizona 1	R+2	Tom O'Halleran (D)	53.8% D	Lean D	Likely D	Likely D	Lean D	Lean D	Likely D	Likely D	Likely D	Tom O'Halleran (D)
Arizona 2	R+1	Ann Kirkpatrick (D)	54.7% D	Safe D	Safe D	Safe D	Safe D	Likely D	Safe D	Solid D	Safe D	Ann Kirkpatrick (D)
Arizona 6	R+9	David Schweikert (R)	55.2% R	Tossup	Tossup	Lean D (flip)	Tossup	Lean R	Tossup	Tossup	Lean R	David Schweikert (R)
Arkansas 2	R+7	French Hill (R)	52.1% R	Tossup	Tossup	Lean R	Tossup	Lean R	Tossup	Lean R	Lean R	French Hill (R)
California 1	R+11	Doug LaMalfa (R)	54.9% R	Safe R	Safe R	Likely R	Safe R	Likely R	Likely R	Solid R	Likely R	Doug LaMalfa (R)
California 4	R+10	Tom McClintock (R)	54.1% R	Likely R	Safe R	Likely R	Likely R	Likely R	Likely R	Solid R	Likely R	Tom McClintock (R)
California 7	D+3	Ami Bera (D)	55.1% D	Safe D	Safe D	Safe D	Safe D	Likely D	Safe D	Solid D	Safe D	Ami Bera (D)
California 8	R+9	Paul Cook (R) (retiring)	60.0% R (Note: The 2018 race was between two Republicans, due to the top-two system in California)	Safe R	Safe R	Safe R	Safe R	Likely R	Likely R	Solid R	Safe R	Jay Obernolte (R)
California 10	EVEN	Josh Harder (D)	52.3% D	Likely D	Safe D	Safe D	Safe D	Lean D	Likely D	Likely D	Safe D	Josh Harder (D)
California 21	D+5	TJ Cox (D)	50.4% D	Tossup	Tossup	Lean D	Tossup	Tossup	Lean D	Tossup	Lean D	David Valadao (R)
California 22	R+8	Devin Nunes (R)	52.7% R	Likely R	Safe R	Safe R	Safe R	Likely R	Likely R	Solid R	Safe R	Devin Nunes (R)
California 25	EVEN	Mike Garcia (R)	54.9% R	Tossup	Tossup	Lean R	Tossup	Tossup	Lean D (flip)	Tossup	Lean R	Mike Garcia (R)
California 39	EVEN	Gil Cisneros (D)	51.6% D	Likely D	Likely D	Lean D	Lean D	Tossup	Tossup	Lean D	Lean D	Young Kim (R)
California 42	R+9	Ken Calvert (R)	56.5% R	Safe R	Safe R	Safe R	Safe R	Safe R	Safe R	Likely R	Safe R	Ken Calvert (R)
California 45	R+3	Katie Porter (D)	52.1% D	Safe D	Safe D	Safe D	Safe D	Likely D	Safe D	Likely D	Safe D	Katie Porter (D)
California 48	R+4	Harley Rouda (D)	53.6% D	Lean D	Lean D	Lean D	Lean D	Lean D	Lean D	Lean D	Lean D	Michelle Steel (R)
California 50	R+11	Vacant	51.7% R	Lean R	Likely R	Likely R	Likely R	Likely R	Likely R	Likely R	Lean R	Darrell Issa (R)
Colorado 3	R+6	Scott Tipton (R) (lost renomination)	51.5% R	Lean R	Tilt R	Lean R	Lean R	Tossup	Tossup	Lean R	Lean R	Lauren Boebert (R)
Colorado 6	D+2	Jason Crow (D)	54.1% D	Safe D	Safe D	Safe D	Safe D	Safe D	Likely D	Solid D	Safe D	Jason Crow (D)
Florida 7	EVEN	Stephanie Murphy (D)	57.7% D	Safe D	Safe D	Safe D	Safe D	Likely D	Likely D	Solid D	Safe D	Stephanie Murphy (D)
Florida 13	D+2	Charlie Crist (D)	57.6% D	Safe D	Safe D	Safe D	Safe D	Likely D	Likely D	Solid D	Safe D	Charlie Crist (D)
Florida 15	R+6	Ross Spano (R) (lost renomination)	53.0% R	Lean R	Lean R	Lean R	Likely R	Tossup	Lean R	Likely R	Lean R	Scott Franklin (R)
Florida 16	R+7	Vern Buchanan (R)	54.6% R	Likely R	Likely R	Likely R	Likely R	Lean R	Likely R	Likely R	Likely R	Vern Buchanan (R)
Florida 18	R+5	Brian Mast (R)	54.3% R	Likely R	Likely R	Likely R	Likely R	Safe R	Likely R	Likely R	Safe R	Brian Mast (R)
Florida 26	D+6	Debbie Mucarsel-Powell (D)	50.9% D	Lean D	Tilt D	Lean D	Tossup	Tossup	Likely D	Likely D	Lean D	Carlos Giménez (R)
Florida 27	D+5	Donna Shalala (D)	51.8% D	Likely D	Safe D	Likely D	Lean D	Likely D	Likely D	Likely D	Safe D	Maria Elvira Salazar (R)
Georgia 6	R+8	Lucy McBath (D)	50.5% D	Likely D	Likely D	Likely D	Lean D	Tossup	Lean D	Lean D	Lean D	Lucy McBath (D)
Georgia 7	R+9	Rob Woodall (R) (retiring)	50.1% R	Lean D (flip)	Tilt D (flip)	Lean D (flip)	Lean D (flip)	Tossup	Tossup	Tossup	Lean D (flip)	Carolyn Bourdeaux (D)
Illinois 6	R+2	Sean Casten (D)	53.6% D	Safe D	Safe D	Safe D	Safe D	Likely D	Lean D	Likely D	Safe D	Sean Casten (D)
Illinois 13	R+3	Rodney Davis (R)	50.4% R	Tossup	Tossup	Lean R	Tossup	Tossup	Tossup	Lean R	Lean R	Rodney Davis (R)
Illinois 14	R+5	Lauren Underwood (D)	52.5% D	Likely D	Safe D	Likely D	Likely D	Lean D	Likely D	Likely D	Likely D	Lauren Underwood (D)
Illinois 17	D+3	Cheri Bustos (D)	62.1% D	Lean D	Safe D	Likely D	Likely D	Likely D	Likely D	Solid D	Likely D	Cheri Bustos (D)
Indiana 5	R+9	Susan Brooks (R) (retiring)	56.8% R	Tossup	Tilt D (flip)	Lean D (flip)	Tossup	Tossup	Tossup	Tossup	Lean D (flip)	Victoria Spartz (R)
Iowa 1	D+1	Abby Finkenauer (D)	51.0% D	Tossup	Lean D	Lean D	Lean D	Tossup	Lean D	Likely D	Lean D	Ashley Hinson (R)
Iowa 2	D+1	Dave Loebsack (D) (retiring)	54.8% D	Tossup	Lean D	Lean D	Lean D	Tossup	Likely D	Likely D	Lean D	Mariannette Miller-Meeks (R)
Iowa 3	R+1	Cindy Axne (D)	49.3% D	Lean D	Lean D	Lean D	Lean D	Tossup	Likely D	Likely D	Lean D	Cindy Axne (D)
Iowa 4	R+11	Steve King (R) (lost primary)	50.3% R	Safe R	Safe R	Safe R	Safe R	Lean R	Likely R	Solid R	Safe R	Randy Feenstra (R)
Kansas 2	R+10	Steve Watkins (R) (lost primary)	47.6% R	Likely R	Safe R	Likely R	Likely R	Lean R	Likely R	Likely R	Likely R	Jake LaTurner (R)
Kansas 3	R+4	Sharice Davids (D)	53.6% D	Safe D	Safe D	Safe D	Safe D	Likely D	Likely D	Solid D	Safe D	Sharice Davids (D)
Kentucky 6	R+9	Andy Barr (R)	51.0% R	Likely R	Safe R	Likely R	Likely R	Lean R	Likely R	Likely R	Likely R	Andy Barr (R)
Maine 2	R+2	Jared Golden (D)	50.5% D	Likely D	Safe D	Likely D	Likely D	Lean D	Likely D	Solid D	Likely D	Jared Golden (D)
Michigan 3	R+6	Justin Amash (L) (retiring)	54.4% R	Tossup	Tossup	Lean R (flip)	Tossup	Tossup	Tossup	Tossup	Lean R (flip)	Peter Meijer (R)
Michigan 6	R+4	Fred Upton (R)	50.2% R	Lean R	Likely R	Lean R	Likely R	Lean R	Lean R	Lean R	Lean R	Fred Upton (R)
Michigan 7	R+7	Tim Walberg (R)	53.8% R	Safe R	Safe R	Safe R	Safe R	Safe R	Safe R	Likely R	Safe R	Tim Walberg (R)
Michigan 8	R+4	Elissa Slotkin (D)	50.6% D	Lean D	Safe D	Likely D	Likely D	Tossup	Likely D	Likely D	Likely D	Elissa Slotkin (D)
Michigan 11	R+4	Haley Stevens (D)	51.8% D	Lean D	Safe D	Likely D	Likely D	Tossup	Likely D	Likely D	Likely D	Haley Stevens (D)
Minnesota 1	R+5	Jim Hagedorn (R)	50.1% R	Tossup	Tilt D (flip)	Lean D (flip)	Tossup	Lean R	Tossup	Lean R	Lean R	Jim Hagedorn (R)
Minnesota 2	R+2	Angie Craig (D)	52.7% D	Likely D	Safe D	Likely D	Likely D	Lean D	Likely D	Likely D	Likely D	Angie Craig (D)
Minnesota 3	D+1	Dean Phillips (D)	55.7% D	Safe D	Safe D	Safe D	Safe D	Safe D	Lean D	Solid D	Safe D	Dean Phillips (D)
Minnesota 5	D+26	Ilhan Omar (D)	78.2% D	Safe D	Safe D	Safe D	Safe D	Safe D	Likely D	Solid D	Safe D	Ilhan Omar (D)
Minnesota 7	R+12	Collin Peterson (D)	52.1% D	Tossup	Tossup	Lean R (flip)	Lean R (flip)	Tossup	Lean R (flip)	Likely R (flip)	Lean R (flip)	Michelle Fischbach (R)
Minnesota 8	R+4	Pete Stauber (R)	50.7% R	Safe R	Safe R	Safe R	Safe R	Likely R	Safe R	Solid R	Safe R	Pete Stauber (R)
Missouri 2	R+8	Ann Wagner (R)	51.2% R	Tossup	Tilt D (flip)	Lean R	Tossup	Tossup	Lean R	Lean R	Lean D (flip)	Ann Wagner (R)
Montana at-large	R+11	Greg Gianforte (R) (retiring)	50.9% R	Lean R	Lean R	Lean R	Lean R	Tossup	Lean R	Likely R	Lean R	Matt Rosendale (R)
Nebraska 2	R+4	Don Bacon (R)	51.0% R	Tossup	Tilt D (flip)	Lean R	Tossup	Tossup	Tossup	Lean R	Lean R	Don Bacon (R)
Nevada 3	R+2	Susie Lee (D)	51.9% D	Lean D	Likely D	Lean D	Lean D	Tossup	Lean D	Likely D	Likely D	Susie Lee (D)
Nevada 4	D+3	Steven Horsford (D)	51.9% D	Likely D	Safe D	Likely D	Likely D	Likely D	Likely D	Lean D	Likely D	Steven Horsford (D)
New Hampshire 1	R+2	Chris Pappas (D)	53.6% D	Likely D	Likely D	Likely D	Likely D	Tossup	Lean D	Likely D	Likely D	Chris Pappas (D)
New Hampshire 2	D+2	Annie Kuster (D)	55.5% D	Safe D	Safe D	Likely D	Safe D	Lean D	Likely D	Solid D	Likely D	Annie Kuster (D)
New Jersey 2	R+1	Jeff Van Drew (R)	52.9% D	Tossup	Tilt D (flip)	Lean D (flip)	Tossup	Tossup	Tossup	Tossup	Lean D (flip)	Jeff Van Drew (R)
New Jersey 3	R+2	Andy Kim (D)	50.0% D	Likely D	Safe D	Likely D	Lean D	Tossup	Likely D	Likely D	Likely D	Andy Kim (D)
New Jersey 5	R+3	Josh Gottheimer (D)	56.2% D	Safe D	Safe D	Safe D	Safe D	Likely D	Safe D	Solid D	Safe D	Josh Gottheimer (D)
New Jersey 7	R+3	Tom Malinowski (D)	51.7% D	Lean D	Likely D	Lean D	Lean D	Lean D	Lean D	Likely D	Lean D	Tom Malinowski (D)
New Jersey 11	R+3	Mikie Sherrill (D)	56.8% D	Safe D	Safe D	Safe D	Safe D	Likely D	Likely D	Solid D	Safe D	Mikie Sherrill (D)
New Mexico 2	R+6	Xochitl Torres Small (D)	50.9% D	Tossup	Tossup	Lean D	Tossup	Tossup	Tossup	Tossup	Lean D	Yvette Herrell (R)
New York 1	R+5	Lee Zeldin (R)	51.5% R	Lean R	Lean R	Lean R	Lean R	Lean R	Lean R	Likely R	Lean R	Lee Zeldin (R)
New York 2	R+3	Peter T. King (R) (retiring)	53.1% R	Tossup	Tossup	Lean R	Tossup	Tossup	Likely D (flip)	Tossup	Lean D (flip)	Andrew Garbarino (R)
New York 11	R+3	Max Rose (D)	53.0% D	Tossup	Tossup	Lean D	Tossup	Tossup	Lean D	Tossup	Lean R (flip)	Nicole Malliotakis (R)
New York 18	R+1	Sean Patrick Maloney (D)	55.5% D	Safe D	Safe D	Likely D	Safe D	Likely D	Likely D	Solid D	Safe D	Sean Patrick Maloney (D)
New York 19	R+2	Antonio Delgado (D)	51.4% D	Likely D	Safe D	Likely D	Safe D	Likely D	Safe D	Likely D	Safe D	Antonio Delgado (D)
New York 21	R+4	Elise Stefanik (R)	56.1% R	Safe R	Safe R	Safe R	Safe R	Safe R	Likely R	Solid R	Safe R	Elise Stefanik (R)
New York 22	R+6	Anthony Brindisi (D)	50.8% D	Tossup	Tilt D	Lean D	Tossup	Tossup	Lean D	Lean D	Lean D	Claudia Tenney (R)
New York 24	D+3	John Katko (R)	52.6% R	Tossup	Tilt R	Lean R	Tossup	Tossup	Tossup	Lean R	Lean D (flip)	John Katko (R)
New York 27	R+11	Chris Jacobs (R)	51.8% R	Safe R	Safe R	Likely R	Safe R	Likely R	Safe R	Solid R	Safe R	Chris Jacobs (R)
North Carolina 1	D+17	G. K. Butterfield (D)	69.8% D	Safe D	Safe D	Safe D	Safe D	Safe D	Lean D	Likely D	Safe D	G. K. Butterfield (D)
North Carolina 2	D+9	George Holding (R) (retiring)	51.3% R	Likely D (flip)	Likely D (flip)	Safe D (flip)	Safe D (flip)	Safe D (flip)	Safe D (flip)	Solid D (flip)	Safe D (flip)	Deborah Ross (D)
North Carolina 6	D+8	Mark Walker (R) (retiring)	56.5% R	Likely D (flip)	Likely D (flip)	Safe D (flip)	Safe D (flip)	Safe D (flip)	Safe D (flip)	Solid D (flip)	Safe D (flip)	Kathy Manning (D)
North Carolina 8	R+5	Richard Hudson (R)	55.3% R	Lean R	Tilt R	Lean R	Lean R	Likely R	Lean R	Lean R	Lean R	Richard Hudson (R)
North Carolina 9	R+7	Dan Bishop (R)	50.7% R	Lean R	Safe R	Likely R	Likely R	Likely R	Likely R	Likely R	Likely R	Dan Bishop (R)
North Carolina 11	R+14	Vacant	59.2% R	Lean R	Lean R	Lean R	Likely R	Likely R	Tossup	Lean R	Likely R	Madison Cawthorn (R)
Ohio 1	R+5	Steve Chabot (R)	51.3% R	Tossup	Tilt D (flip)	Lean D (flip)	Tossup	Likely R	Lean R	Tossup	Lean R	Steve Chabot (R)
Ohio 10	R+4	Mike Turner (R)	55.9% R	Likely R	Likely R	Likely R	Likely R	Likely R	Lean R	Likely R	Safe R	Mike Turner (R)
Ohio 12	R+7	Troy Balderson (R)	51.4% R	Likely R	Safe R	Likely R	Likely R	Lean R	Safe R	Likely R	Likely R	Troy Balderson (R)
Ohio 13	D+7	Tim Ryan (D)	61.0% D	Safe D	Safe D	Safe D	Safe D	Safe D	Likely D	Solid D	Safe D	Tim Ryan (D)
Oklahoma 5	R+10	Kendra Horn (D)	50.7% D	Tossup	Tossup	Lean D	Tossup	Tossup	Tossup	Tossup	Lean R (flip)	Stephanie Bice (R)
Oregon 4	EVEN	Peter DeFazio (D)	56.0% D	Lean D	Likely D	Lean D	Likely D	Tossup	Tossup	Likely D	Lean D	Peter DeFazio (D)
Pennsylvania 1	R+1	Brian Fitzpatrick (R)	51.3% R	Lean R	Lean R	Lean R	Tossup	Tossup	Lean R	Likely R	Lean R	Brian Fitzpatrick (R)
Pennsylvania 7	D+1	Susan Wild (D)	53.5% D	Likely D	Safe D	Likely D	Safe D	Likely D	Likely D	Solid D	Likely D	Susan Wild (D)
Pennsylvania 8	R+1	Matt Cartwright (D)	54.6% D	Lean D	Safe D	Likely D	Likely D	Tossup	Likely D	Likely D	Likely D	Matt Cartwright (D)
Pennsylvania 10	R+6	Scott Perry (R)	51.3% R	Tossup	Tossup	Lean D (flip)	Tossup	Tossup	Tossup	Tossup	Lean D (flip)	Scott Perry (R)
Pennsylvania 16	R+8	Mike Kelly (R)	51.6% R	Likely R	Safe R	Safe R	Safe R	Safe R	Safe R	Solid R	Likely R	Mike Kelly (R)
Pennsylvania 17	R+3	Conor Lamb (D)	56.3% D	Likely D	Safe D	Likely D	Likely D	Tossup	Tossup	Likely D	Lean D	Conor Lamb (D)
South Carolina 1	R+10	Joe Cunningham (D)	50.6% D	Lean D	Lean D	Lean D	Lean D	Tossup	Tossup	Lean D	Lean D	Nancy Mace (R)
South Carolina 2	R+12	Joe Wilson (R)	56.3% R	Safe R	Safe R	Likely R	Likely R	Safe R	Likely R	Solid R	Lean R	Joe Wilson (R)
Texas 1	R+25	Louie Gohmert (R)	72.3% R	Safe R	Safe R	Safe R	Safe R	Safe R	Likely R	Solid R	Safe R	Louie Gohmert (R)
Texas 2	R+11	Dan Crenshaw (R)	52.8% R	Likely R	Safe R	Likely R	Likely R	Safe R	Safe R	Solid R	Likely R	Dan Crenshaw (R)
Texas 3	R+13	Van Taylor (R)	54.3% R	Lean R	Lean R	Likely R	Likely R	Safe R	Lean R	Likely R	Likely R	Van Taylor (R)
Texas 6	R+9	Ron Wright (R)	53.1% R	Likely R	Likely R	Likely R	Likely R	Safe R	Likely R	Likely R	Likely R	Ron Wright (R)
Texas 7	R+7	Lizzie Fletcher (D)	52.5% D	Likely D	Likely D	Likely D	Likely D	Lean D	Tossup	Likely D	Likely D	Lizzie Fletcher (D)
Texas 10	R+9	Michael McCaul (R)	51.1% R	Tossup	Lean R	Lean R	Lean R	Tossup	Lean R	Likely R	Lean R	Michael McCaul (R)
Texas 21	R+10	Chip Roy (R)	50.2% R	Tossup	Tossup	Lean R	Tossup	Tossup	Lean R	Lean R	Lean R	Chip Roy (R)
Texas 22	R+10	Pete Olson (R) (retiring)	51.4% R	Tossup	Tossup	Lean R	Tossup	Tossup	Lean D (flip)	Lean R	Lean R	Troy Nehls (R)
Texas 23	R+1	Will Hurd (R) (retiring)	49.2% R	Lean D (flip)	Tilt D (flip)	Lean D (flip)	Lean D (flip)	Tossup	Lean D (flip)	Lean D (flip)	Likely D (flip)	Tony Gonzales (R)
Texas 24	R+9	Kenny Marchant (R) (retiring)	50.6% R	Lean D (flip)	Tilt D (flip)	Lean D (flip)	Tossup	Tossup	Tossup	Tossup	Lean D (flip)	Beth Van Duyne (R)
Texas 25	R+11	Roger Williams (R)	53.5% R	Likely R	Likely R	Likely R	Likely R	Likely R	Likely R	Likely R	Likely R	Roger Williams (R)
Texas 27	R+13	Michael Cloud (R)	60.3% R	Safe R	Safe R	Safe R	Safe R	Safe R	Likely R	Solid R	Safe R	Michael Cloud (R)
Texas 31	R+10	John Carter (R)	50.6% R	Lean R	Safe R	Likely R	Likely R	Likely R	Safe R	Likely R	Likely R	John Carter (R)
Texas 32	R+5	Colin Allred (D)	52.3% D	Likely D	Safe D	Likely D	Likely D	Lean D	Lean D	Likely D	Likely D	Colin Allred (D)
Utah 4	R+13	Ben McAdams (D)	50.1% D	Tossup	Tilt D	Lean D	Tossup	Tossup	Tossup	Tossup	Lean D	Burgess Owens (R)
Virginia 1	R+8	Rob Wittman (R)	55.2% R	Safe R	Safe R	Safe R	Safe R	Safe R	Safe R	Likely R	Safe R	Rob Wittman (R)
Virginia 2	R+3	Elaine Luria (D)	51.1% D	Lean D	Likely D	Lean D	Lean D	Tossup	Likely D	Likely D	Lean D	Elaine Luria (D)
Virginia 5	R+6	Denver Riggleman (R) (lost renomination)	53.2% R	Tossup	Tossup	Lean R	Lean R	Lean R	Lean D (flip)	Tossup	Lean D (flip)	Bob Good (R)
Virginia 7	R+6	Abigail Spanberger (D)	50.3% D	Lean D	Tilt D	Lean D	Tossup	Tossup	Tossup	Likely D	Lean D	Abigail Spanberger (D)
Virginia 10	D+1	Jennifer Wexton (D)	56.2% D	Safe D	Safe D	Safe D	Safe D	Safe D	Likely D	Solid D	Safe D	Jennifer Wexton (D)
Washington 3	R+4	Jaime Herrera Beutler (R)	52.7% R	Lean R	Lean R	Lean R	Lean R	Lean R	Lean R	Likely R	Likely R	Jaime Herrera Beutler (R)
Washington 8	EVEN	Kim Schrier (D)	52.4% D	Likely D	Safe D	Lean D	Safe D	Lean D	Likely D	Solid D	Likely D	Kim Schrier (D)
Wisconsin 3	EVEN	Ron Kind (D)	59.7% D	Lean D	Safe D	Likely D	Likely D	Lean D	Likely D	Likely D	Likely D	Ron Kind (D)
Overall				D - 229; R - 179; 27 tossups	D - 239; R - 181; 15 tossups	D - 243; R - 192	D - 228; R - 181; 26 tossups	D - 209; R - 182; 44 tossups	D - 230; R - 182; 23 tossups	D - 230; R - 189; 16 tossups	D - 242; R - 193	D - 222 ▼13; R - 213 ▲14; L - 0 ▼1
District	2017 CPVI	Incumbent	Previous result	Cook	IE	Sabato	Daily Kos	RCP	DDHQ	538	ED	Winner

=== Generic ballot polls ===
The following is a list of generic party ballot polls conducted in advance of the 2020 House of Representatives elections.

Polling aggregates
Source of poll aggregation	Date updated	Dates polled	Democratic	Republican	Lead
FiveThirtyEight	Nov 3, 2020	Until Nov 2, 2020	49.9%	42.6%	+7.3%
RealClearPolitics	Nov 3, 2020	Oct 25, 2020 - Nov 2, 2020	49.3%	42.5%	+6.8%
Average			49.6%	42.6%	+7.1%

== Party listings ==
The campaign committees for the two parties—the DCCC and NRCC—publish their own lists of targeted seats.

=== Democratic ===
These races were added to the DCCC's "battlefield" list in January 2020.

- AK-AL -- Don Young
- CA-25 -- Mike Garcia
- KS-02 -- Steven Watkins
- NC-08 -- Richard Hudson
- NJ-02 -- Jeff Van Drew
- TX-02 -- Dan Crenshaw

These races were added to the DCCC's "battlefield" list in August 2019.

- FL-16 -- Vern Buchanan
- IA-02 -- Dave Loebsack (D)
- MI-03 -- Justin Amash (L)
- MT-AL -- Greg Gianforte
- OH-12 -- Troy Balderson
- VA-05 -- Denver Riggleman

These races were added to the DCCC's "battlefield" list in January 2019.

- AZ-06 -- David Schweikert
- CA-22 -- Devin Nunes
- CA-50 -- Duncan D. Hunter
- CO-03 -- Scott Tipton
- FL-15 -- Ross Spano
- FL-18 -- Brian Mast
- GA-07 -- Rob Woodall
- IA-04 -- Steve King
- IL-13 -- Rodney Davis
- IN-05 -- Susan Brooks
- KY-06 -- Andy Barr
- MI-06 -- Fred Upton
- MN-01 -- Jim Hagedorn
- MO-02 -- Ann Wagner
- NC-02 -- George Holding
- NC-09 -- Dan Bishop
- NC-13 -- Ted Budd
- NE-02 -- Don Bacon
- NY-01 -- Lee Zeldin
- NY-02 -- Peter King
- NY-24 -- John Katko
- NY-27 -- Chris Collins
- OH-01 -- Steve Chabot
- PA-01 -- Brian Fitzpatrick
- PA-10 -- Scott Perry
- PA-16 -- Mike Kelly
- TX-10 -- Michael McCaul
- TX-21 -- Chip Roy
- TX-22 -- Pete Olson
- TX-23 -- Will Hurd
- TX-24 -- Kenny Marchant
- TX-31 -- John Carter
- WA-03 -- Jaime Herrera Beutler

These races were added to the DCCC's "frontline" list of defensive targets in February 2019.

- AZ-01 -- Tom O'Halleran
- CA-10 -- Josh Harder
- CA-21 -- TJ Cox
- CA-39 -- Gil Cisneros
- CA-45 -- Katie Porter
- CA-48 -- Harley Rouda
- CA-49 -- Mike Levin
- CO-06 -- Jason Crow
- CT-05 -- Jahana Hayes
- FL-26 -- Debbie Mucarsel-Powell
- GA-06 -- Lucy McBath
- IA-01 -- Abby Finkenauer
- IA-03 -- Cindy Axne
- IL-06 -- Sean Casten
- IL-14 -- Lauren Underwood
- KS-03 -- Sharice Davids
- ME-02 -- Jared Golden
- MI-08 -- Elissa Slotkin
- MI-11 -- Haley Stevens
- MN-02 -- Angie Craig
- NH-01 -- Chris Pappas
- NJ-03 -- Andy Kim
- NJ-05 -- Josh Gottheimer
- NJ-07 -- Tom Malinowski
- NJ-11 -- Mikie Sherrill
- NM-02 -- Xochitl Torres Small
- NV-03 -- Susie Lee
- NV-04 -- Steven Horsford
- NY-11 -- Max Rose
- NY-19 -- Antonio Delgado
- NY-22 -- Anthony Brindisi
- OK-05 -- Kendra Horn
- PA-07 -- Susan Wild
- PA-08 -- Matt Cartwright
- PA-17 -- Conor Lamb
- SC-01 -- Joe Cunningham
- TX-07 -- Lizzie Fletcher
- TX-32 -- Colin Allred
- UT-04 -- Ben McAdams
- VA-02 -- Elaine Luria
- VA-07 -- Abigail Spanberger
- WA-08 -- Kim Schrier

=== Republican ===
These races were announced as the NRCC's offensive targets in February 2019.

- AZ-01 -- Tom O'Halleran
- AZ-02 -- Ann Kirkpatrick
- CA-10 -- Josh Harder
- CA-21 -- TJ Cox
- CA-25 -- Katie Hill
- CA-39 -- Gil Cisneros
- CA-45 -- Katie Porter
- CA-48 -- Harley Rouda
- CA-49 -- Mike Levin
- CO-06 -- Jason Crow
- FL-07 -- Stephanie Murphy
- FL-13 -- Charlie Crist
- FL-26 -- Debbie Mucarsel-Powell
- FL-27 -- Donna Shalala
- GA-06 -- Lucy McBath
- IA-01 -- Abby Finkenauer
- IA-02 -- Dave Loebsack
- IA-03 -- Cindy Axne
- IL-06 -- Sean Casten
- IL-14 -- Lauren Underwood
- IL-17 -- Cheri Bustos
- KS-03 -- Sharice Davids
- ME-02 -- Jared Golden
- MI-08 -- Elissa Slotkin
- MI-11 -- Haley Stevens
- MN-02 -- Angie Craig
- MN-03 -- Dean Phillips
- MN-07 -- Collin Peterson
- NH-01 -- Chris Pappas
- NJ-03 -- Andy Kim
- NJ-05 -- Josh Gottheimer
- NJ-07 -- Tom Malinowski
- NJ-11 -- Mikie Sherrill
- NM-02 -- Xochitl Torres Small
- NV-03 -- Susie Lee
- NV-04 -- Steven Horsford
- NY-11 -- Max Rose
- NY-18 -- Sean Patrick Maloney
- NY-19 -- Antonio Delgado
- NY-22 -- Anthony Brindisi
- OK-05 -- Kendra Horn
- OR-04 -- Peter DeFazio
- PA-07 -- Susan Wild
- PA-08 -- Matt Cartwright
- PA-17 -- Conor Lamb
- SC-01 -- Joe Cunningham
- TX-07 -- Lizzie Fletcher
- TX-32 -- Colin Allred
- UT-04 -- Ben McAdams
- VA-02 -- Elaine Luria
- VA-07 -- Abigail Spanberger
- VA-10 -- Jennifer Wexton
- WA-08 -- Kim Schrier
- WI-03 -- Ron Kind
