= 2018 United States House of Representatives election ratings =

Predictions for select races in the 2018 U.S. House elections

The 2018 United States House of Representatives elections were held on November 6, 2018, with early voting taking place in some states in the weeks preceding that date. Voters chose representatives from all 435 congressional districts across each of the 50 U.S. states. Non-voting delegates from the District of Columbia and four of the five inhabited U.S. territories (Note: Not including the Resident Commissioner of Puerto Rico, who serves a four-year term.) were also elected. These midterm elections took place nearly halfway through the first term of Republican President Donald Trump. The winners will serve in the 116th United States Congress, with seats apportioned among the states based on the 2010 United States census. On Election Day, Republicans had held a House majority since January 2011 as a result of the 2010 elections.

In the 2018 midterm elections, the Democrats won control of the House and had a net gain of more than 40 seats from their total after the 2016 elections (including one seat gained previously with Conor Lamb's March 2018 special election victory). This was their largest gain of seats since the 1974 elections, when they picked up 49 seats.

== Election ratings ==
=== Latest published ratings for competitive seats ===
Several sites and individuals publish ratings of competitive seats. The seats listed below were considered competitive (not "safe" or "solid") by at least one of the rating groups. These ratings are based upon factors such as the strength of the incumbent (if the incumbent is running for re-election), the strength of the candidates, and the partisan history of the district (the Cook Partisan Voting Index is one example of this metric). Each rating describes the likelihood of a given outcome in the election.

Most election ratings use:

- Tossup: no advantage
- Tilt (sometimes used): very slight advantage
- Lean: significant, but not overwhelming advantage
- Likely: strong, but not certain advantage
- Safe or Solid: outcome is nearly certain

The following are the latest published ratings for competitive seats.

| District | CPVI | Incumbent | Previous result | Cook November 5, 2018 | IE November 5, 2018 | Sabato November 5, 2018 | RCP November 5, 2018 | Daily Kos November 5, 2018 | 538 November 6, 2018 (Note: Reflects the "Classic" version of the forecast model.) | Result |
|---|---|---|---|---|---|---|---|---|---|---|
| Alaska at-large | R+9 | Don Young (R) | 50.3% R | Lean R | Likely R | Lean R | Tossup | Lean R | Lean R | Don Young (R) |
| Arizona 1 | R+2 | Tom O'Halleran (D) | 50.7% D | Lean D | Lean D | Likely D | Tossup | Likely D | Likely D | Tom O'Halleran (D) |
| Arizona 2 | R+1 | Martha McSally (R) (retiring) (Note: Retired to run for senate) | 57.0% R | Lean D (flip) | Lean D (flip) | Likely D (flip) | Lean D (flip) | Likely D (flip) | Safe D (flip) | Ann Kirkpatrick (D) (flip) |
| Arizona 6 | R+9 | David Schweikert (R) | 62.1% R | Likely R | Safe R | Likely R | Likely R | Safe R | Likely R | David Schweikert (R) |
| Arizona 8 | R+13 | Debbie Lesko (R) | 52.4% R | Likely R | Likely R | Likely R | Likely R | Safe R | Likely R | Debbie Lesko (R) |
| Arizona 9 | D+4 | Kyrsten Sinema (D) (retiring) | 60.9% D | Safe D | Safe D | Safe D | Likely D | Safe D | Safe D | Greg Stanton (D) |
| Arkansas 2 | R+7 | French Hill (R) | 58.4% R | Likely R | Likely R | Lean R | Likely R | Likely R | Likely R | French Hill (R) |
| California 1 | R+11 | Doug LaMalfa (R) | 59.1% R | Likely R | Safe R | Safe R | Safe R | Safe R | Likely R | Doug LaMalfa (R) |
| California 4 | R+10 | Tom McClintock (R) | 62.7% R | Likely R | Likely R | Likely R | Likely R | Likely R | Likely R | Tom McClintock (R) |
| California 7 | D+3 | Ami Bera (D) | 51.2% D | Likely D | Safe D | Likely D | Lean D | Safe D | Safe D | Ami Bera (D) |
| California 10 | EVEN | Jeff Denham (R) | 51.7% R | Tossup | Tossup | Lean D (flip) | Tossup | Tossup | Likely D (flip) | Josh Harder (D) (flip) |
| California 16 | D+9 | Jim Costa (D) | 58.0% D | Likely D | Safe D | Likely D | Safe D | Safe D | Safe D | Jim Costa (D) |
| California 21 | D+5 | David Valadao (R) | 56.7% R | Likely R | Likely R | Lean R | Likely R | Likely R | Likely R | TJ Cox (D) (flip) |
| California 22 | R+8 | Devin Nunes (R) | 67.6% R | Likely R | Safe R | Likely R | Likely R | Likely R | Safe R | Devin Nunes (R) |
| California 24 | D+7 | Salud Carbajal (D) | 53.4% D | Safe D | Safe D | Likely D | Likely D | Safe D | Safe D | Salud Carbajal (D) |
| California 25 | EVEN | Steve Knight (R) | 53.1% R | Tossup | Tossup | Lean R | Tossup | Tossup | Lean D (flip) | Katie Hill (D) (flip) |
| California 39 | EVEN | Ed Royce (R) (retiring) | 57.2% R | Tossup | Tossup | Lean R | Tossup | Tossup | Tossup | Gil Cisneros (D) (flip) |
| California 45 | R+3 | Mimi Walters (R) | 58.6% R | Tossup | Tossup | Lean D (flip) | Tossup | Tossup | Lean D (flip) | Katie Porter (D) (flip) |
| California 48 | R+4 | Dana Rohrabacher (R) | 58.3% R | Tossup | Tilt D (flip) | Lean D (flip) | Tossup | Tossup | Tossup | Harley Rouda (D) (flip) |
| California 49 | R+1 | Darrell Issa (R) (retiring) | 50.3% R | Likely D (flip) | Lean D (flip) | Likely D (flip) | Lean D (flip) | Likely D (flip) | Safe D (flip) | Mike Levin (D) (flip) |
| California 50 | R+11 | Duncan D. Hunter (R) | 63.5% R | Lean R | Lean R | Lean R | Lean R | Lean R | Likely R | Duncan D. Hunter (R) |
| Colorado 3 | R+6 | Scott Tipton (R) | 54.6% R | Likely R | Safe R | Lean R | Likely R | Likely R | Likely R | Scott Tipton (R) |
| Colorado 6 | D+2 | Mike Coffman (R) | 50.9% R | Lean D (flip) | Tilt D (flip) | Lean D (flip) | Lean D (flip) | Lean D (flip) | Likely D (flip) | Jason Crow (D) (flip) |
| Florida 6 | R+7 | (Vacant) (Note: Ron DeSantis resigned in September 2018, seat remained vacant until the start of the next Congress) | 58.6% R | Lean R | Lean R | Lean R | Likely R | Lean R | Lean R | Michael Waltz (R) |
| Florida 7 | EVEN | Stephanie Murphy (D) | 51.5% D | Likely D | Likely D | Likely D | Lean D | Likely D | Likely D | Stephanie Murphy (D) |
| Florida 13 | D+2 | Charlie Crist (D) | 51.9% D | Safe D | Safe D | Safe D | Likely D | Safe D | Safe D | Charlie Crist (D) |
| Florida 15 | R+6 | Dennis A. Ross (R) (retiring) | 57.5% R | Tossup | Tilt R | Lean R | Tossup | Lean R | Tossup | Ross Spano (R) |
| Florida 16 | R+7 | Vern Buchanan (R) | 59.8% R | Lean R | Likely R | Likely R | Lean R | Likely R | Likely R | Vern Buchanan (R) |
| Florida 18 | R+5 | Brian Mast (R) | 53.6% R | Lean R | Likely R | Lean R | Lean R | Lean R | Likely R | Brian Mast (R) |
| Florida 25 | R+4 | Mario Díaz-Balart (R) | 62.4% R | Lean R | Safe R | Likely R | Likely R | Likely R | Lean R | Mario Díaz-Balart (R) |
| Florida 26 | D+6 | Carlos Curbelo (R) | 53.0% R | Tossup | Tossup | Lean R | Tossup | Tossup | Tossup | Debbie Mucarsel-Powell (D) (flip) |
| Florida 27 | D+5 | Ileana Ros-Lehtinen (R) (retiring) | 54.9% R | Lean D (flip) | Lean D (flip) | Lean D (flip) | Tossup | Lean D (flip) | Likely D (flip) | Donna Shalala (D) (flip) |
| Georgia 6 | R+8 | Karen Handel (R) | 51.8% R | Tossup | Lean R | Lean R | Tossup | Lean R | Tossup | Lucy McBath (D) (flip) |
| Georgia 7 | R+9 | Rob Woodall (R) | 60.4% R | Lean R | Lean R | Lean R | Lean R | Lean R | Likely R | Rob Woodall (R) |
| Illinois 6 | R+2 | Peter Roskam (R) | 59.2% R | Lean D (flip) | Tilt D (flip) | Lean D (flip) | Tossup | Tossup | Tossup | Sean Casten (D) (flip) |
| Illinois 12 | R+5 | Mike Bost (R) | 54.3% R | Lean R | Tilt R | Lean R | Lean R | Lean R | Lean R | Mike Bost (R) |
| Illinois 13 | R+3 | Rodney Davis (R) | 59.7% R | Lean R | Lean R | Lean R | Lean R | Lean R | Lean R | Rodney Davis (R) |
| Illinois 14 | R+5 | Randy Hultgren (R) | 59.3% R | Tossup | Tossup | Lean D (flip) | Tossup | Tossup | Lean D (flip) | Lauren Underwood (D) (flip) |
| Indiana 2 | R+11 | Jackie Walorski (R) | 59.3% R | Likely R | Likely R | Likely R | Likely R | Likely R | Safe R | Jackie Walorski (R) |
| Indiana 9 | R+13 | Trey Hollingsworth (R) | 54.1% R | Safe R | Safe R | Likely R | Safe R | Likely R | Likely R | Trey Hollingsworth (R) |
| Iowa 1 | D+1 | Rod Blum (R) | 53.7% R | Lean D (flip) | Lean D (flip) | Lean D (flip) | Lean D (flip) | Lean D (flip) | Safe D (flip) | Abby Finkenauer (D) (flip) |
| Iowa 2 | D+1 | Dave Loebsack (D) | 53.7% D | Safe D | Safe D | Safe D | Likely D | Safe D | Safe D | Dave Loebsack (D) |
| Iowa 3 | R+1 | David Young (R) | 53.5% R | Tossup | Tossup | Lean D (flip) | Tossup | Tossup | Lean D (flip) | Cindy Axne (D) (flip) |
| Iowa 4 | R+11 | Steve King (R) | 61.2% R | Lean R | Likely R | Lean R | Lean R | Likely R | Likely R | Steve King (R) |
| Kansas 2 | R+10 | Lynn Jenkins (R) (retiring) | 60.9% R | Tossup | Tossup | Lean D (flip) | Tossup | Tossup | Lean D (flip) | Steve Watkins (R) |
| Kansas 3 | R+4 | Kevin Yoder (R) | 51.3% R | Lean D (flip) | Lean D (flip) | Lean D (flip) | Lean D (flip) | Lean D (flip) | Likely D (flip) | Sharice Davids (D) (flip) |
| Kentucky 6 | R+9 | Andy Barr (R) | 61.1% R | Tossup | Tossup | Lean R | Tossup | Tossup | Tossup | Andy Barr (R) |
| Maine 2 | R+2 | Bruce Poliquin (R) | 54.8% R | Tossup | Tossup | Lean D (flip) | Tossup | Tossup | Lean D (flip) | Jared Golden (D) (flip) |
| Michigan 1 | R+9 | Jack Bergman (R) | 54.9% R | Likely R | Safe R | Likely R | Safe R | Likely R | Likely R | Jack Bergman (R) |
| Michigan 2 | R+9 | Bill Huizenga (R) | 62.6% R | Safe R | Safe R | Likely R | Safe R | Safe R | Likely R | Bill Huizenga (R) |
| Michigan 3 | R+6 | Justin Amash (R) | 59.5% R | Likely R | Safe R | Likely R | Safe R | Safe R | Safe R | Justin Amash (R) |
| Michigan 6 | R+6 | Fred Upton (R) | 58.7% R | Lean R | Likely R | Lean R | Lean R | Lean R | Likely R | Fred Upton (R |
| Michigan 7 | R+7 | Tim Walberg (R) | 55.1% R | Likely R | Likely R | Likely R | Lean R | Likely R | Tossup | Tim Walberg (R) |
| Michigan 8 | R+4 | Mike Bishop (R) | 56.0% R | Tossup | Tilt D (flip) | Lean D (flip) | Tossup | Tossup | Lean D (flip) | Elissa Slotkin (D) (flip) |
| Michigan 11 | R+4 | Dave Trott (R) (retiring) | 52.9% R | Lean D (flip) | Tilt D (flip) | Lean D (flip) | Tossup | Lean D (flip) | Likely D (flip) | Haley Stevens (D) |
| Minnesota 1 | R+5 | Tim Walz (D) (retiring) | 50.3% D | Tossup | Tossup | Lean D | Tossup | Tossup | Tossup | Jim Hagedorn (R) |
| Minnesota 2 | R+2 | Jason Lewis (R) | 47.0% R | Lean D (flip) | Tilt D (flip) | Lean D (flip) | Lean D (flip) | Tossup | Likely D (flip) | Angie Craig (D) (flip) |
| Minnesota 3 | D+1 | Erik Paulsen (R) | 56.7% R | Lean D (flip) | Tilt D (flip) | Lean D (flip) | Lean D (flip) | Tossup | Likely D (flip) | Dean Phillips (D) (flip) |
| Minnesota 7 | R+12 | Collin Peterson (D) | 52.5% D | Likely D | Safe D | Likely D | Tossup | Likely D | Likely D | Collin Peterson (D) |
| Minnesota 8 | R+4 | Rick Nolan (D) (retiring) | 50.2% D | Lean R (flip) | Lean R (flip) | Lean R (flip) | Lean R (flip) | Lean R (flip) | Likely R (flip) | Pete Stauber (R) (flip) |
| Missouri 2 | R+8 | Ann Wagner (R) | 58.5% R | Lean R | Safe R | Likely R | Likely R | Likely R | Likely R | Ann Wagner (R) |
| Montana at-large | R+11 | Greg Gianforte (R) | 49.9% R | Lean R | Likely R | Lean R | Tossup | Lean R | Likely R | Greg Gianforte (R) |
| Nebraska 2 | R+4 | Don Bacon (R) | 48.9% R | Lean R | Lean R | Lean R | Lean R | Likely R | Tossup | Don Bacon (R) |
| Nevada 3 | R+2 | Jacky Rosen (D) (retiring) | 47.2% D | Lean D | Tilt D | Lean D | Tossup | Lean D | Likely D | Susie Lee (D) |
| Nevada 4 | D+3 | Ruben Kihuen (D) (retiring) | 48.5% D | Lean D | Lean D | Likely D | Tossup | Lean D | Likely D | Steven Horsford (D) |
| New Hampshire 1 | R+2 | Carol Shea-Porter (D) (retiring) | 44.3% D | Likely D | Lean D | Likely D | Tossup | Lean D | Likely D | Chris Pappas (D) |
| New Hampshire 2 | D+2 | Ann McLane Kuster (D) | 49.8% D | Safe D | Safe D | Safe D | Likely D | Safe D | Safe D | Ann McLane Kuster (D) |
| New Jersey 2 | R+1 | Frank LoBiondo (R) (retiring) | 59.2% R | Likely D (flip) | Likely D (flip) | Safe D (flip) | Likely D (flip) | Safe D (flip) | Safe D (flip) | Jeff Van Drew (D) (flip) |
| New Jersey 3 | R+2 | Tom MacArthur (R) | 59.3% R | Tossup | Tilt D (flip) | Lean D (flip) | Tossup | Tossup | Tossup | Andy Kim (D) (flip) |
| New Jersey 4 | R+8 | Chris Smith (R) | 63.7% R | Safe R | Safe R | Safe R | Safe R | Safe R | Likely R | Chris Smith (R) |
| New Jersey 5 | R+3 | Josh Gottheimer (D) | 51.1% D | Likely D | Safe D | Likely D | Likely D | Likely D | Safe D | Josh Gottheimer (D) |
| New Jersey 7 | R+3 | Leonard Lance (R) | 54.1% R | Tossup | Tossup | Lean D (flip) | Lean D (flip) | Tossup | Likely D (flip) | Tom Malinowski (D) (flip) |
| New Jersey 11 | R+3 | Rodney Frelinghuysen (R) (retiring) | 58.0% R | Lean D (flip) | Lean D (flip) | Lean D (flip) | Lean D (flip) | Lean D (flip) | Likely D (flip) | Mikie Sherrill (D) (flip) |
| New Mexico 1 | D+7 | Michelle Lujan Grisham (D) (retiring) | 65.1% D | Safe D | Safe D | Safe D | Likely D | Safe D | Safe D | Deb Haaland (D) |
| New Mexico 2 | R+6 | Steve Pearce (R) (retiring) | 62.7% R | Tossup | Tossup | Lean D (flip) | Tossup | Tossup | Tossup | Xochitl Torres Small (D) (flip) |
| New York 1 | R+5 | Lee Zeldin (R) | 58.2% R | Likely R | Safe R | Lean R | Lean R | Likely R | Likely R | Lee Zeldin (R) |
| New York 2 | R+3 | Peter King (R) | 57.2% R | Likely R | Safe R | Likely R | Likely R | Safe R | Lean R | Peter King (R) |
| New York 3 | D+1 | Thomas Suozzi (D) | 52.4% D | Safe D | Safe D | Safe D | Likely D | Safe D | Safe D | Thomas Suozzi (D) |
| New York 11 | R+3 | Dan Donovan (R) | 61.5% R | Lean R | Lean R | Lean R | Lean R | Lean R | Likely R | Max Rose (D) (flip) |
| New York 18 | R+1 | Sean Patrick Maloney (D) | 55.6% D | Safe D | Safe D | Likely D | Likely D | Safe D | Safe D | Sean Patrick Maloney (D) |
| New York 19 | R+2 | John Faso (R) | 54.0% R | Tossup | Tilt D (flip) | Lean D (flip) | Tossup | Tossup | Lean D (flip) | Antonio Delgado (D) (flip) |
| New York 21 | R+4 | Elise Stefanik (R) | 61.6% R | Likely R | Safe R | Likely R | Safe R | Likely R | Likely R | Elise Stefanik (R) |
| New York 22 | R+6 | Claudia Tenney (R) | 46.5% R | Tossup | Tilt D (flip) | Lean D (flip) | Tossup | Tossup | Tossup | Anthony Brindisi (D) (flip) |
| New York 23 | R+6 | Tom Reed (R) | 57.6% R | Likely R | Safe R | Likely R | Safe R | Likely R | Likely R | Tom Reed (R) |
| New York 24 | D+3 | John Katko (R) | 60.5% R | Lean R | Lean R | Lean R | Likely R | Lean R | Likely R | John Katko (R) |
| New York 27 | R+11 | Chris Collins (R) | 67.2% R | Lean R | Lean R | Lean R | Lean R | Lean R | Likely R | Chris Collins (R) |
| North Carolina 2 | R+7 | George Holding (R) | 56.7% R | Lean R | Lean R | Lean R | Lean R | Lean R | Likely R | George Holding (R) |
| North Carolina 6 | R+9 | Mark Walker (R) | 59.2% R | Safe R | Safe R | Safe R | Safe R | Safe R | Likely R | Mark Walker (R) |
| North Carolina 7 | R+9 | David Rouzer (R) | 60.9% R | Safe R | Safe R | Safe R | Safe R | Safe R | Likely R | David Rouzer (R) |
| North Carolina 8 | R+8 | Richard Hudson (R) | 58.8% R | Likely R | Safe R | Likely R | Likely R | Safe R | Likely R | Richard Hudson (R) |
| North Carolina 9 | R+8 | Robert Pittenger (R) (lost renomination) | 58.2% R | Tossup | Tossup | Lean D (flip) | Tossup | Tossup | Tossup | Election voided. |
| North Carolina 13 | R+6 | Ted Budd (R) | 56.1% R | Tossup | Tilt R | Lean R | Lean R | Lean R | Lean R | Ted Budd (R) |
| Ohio 1 | R+5 | Steve Chabot (R) | 59.2% R | Lean R | Tilt R | Lean R | Lean R | Lean R | Likely R | Steve Chabot (R) |
| Ohio 7 | R+12 | Bob Gibbs (R) | 64.0% R | Safe R | Safe R | Likely R | Safe R | Likely R | Safe R | Bob Gibbs (R) |
| Ohio 10 | R+4 | Mike Turner (R) | 64.1% R | Likely R | Safe R | Likely R | Likely R | Likely R | Likely R | Mike Turner (R) |
| Ohio 12 | R+7 | Troy Balderson (R) | 50.1% R | Tossup | Tossup | Lean R | Lean R | Lean R | Lean R | Troy Balderson (R) |
| Ohio 14 | R+5 | David Joyce (R) | 62.6% R | Likely R | Likely R | Lean R | Likely R | Likely R | Likely R | David Joyce (R) |
| Ohio 15 | R+7 | Steve Stivers (R) | 66.2% R | Safe R | Safe R | Likely R | Safe R | Safe R | Safe R | Steve Stivers (R) |
| Ohio 16 | R+8 | Jim Renacci (R) (retiring) | 65.3% R | Safe R | Safe R | Safe R | Safe R | Safe R | Likely R | Anthony Gonzalez (R) |
| Oklahoma 5 | R+10 | Steve Russell (R) | 57.1% R | Likely R | Safe R | Likely R | Likely R | Likely R | Likely R | Kendra Horn (D) (flip) |
| Oregon 5 | EVEN | Kurt Schrader (D) | 53.6% D | Safe D | Safe D | Safe D | Lean D | Safe D | Likely D | Kurt Schrader (D) |
| Pennsylvania 1 | R+1 | Brian Fitzpatrick (R) | – | Tossup | Tossup | Lean R | Tossup | Tossup | Tossup | Brian Fitzpatrick (R) |
| Pennsylvania 5 | D+13 | (Vacant) (Note: Pat Meehan (R) resigned in April, Mary Gay Scanlon (D) won a simultaneous special election to fill the remainder of Meehan's term.) | – | Likely D (flip) | Likely D (flip) | Safe D (flip) | Likely D (flip) | Safe D (flip) | Safe D (flip) | Mary Gay Scanlon (D) (flip) |
| Pennsylvania 6 | D+2 | Ryan Costello (R) (retiring) | – | Likely D (flip) | Likely D (flip) | Safe D (flip) | Likely D (flip) | Safe D (flip) | Safe D (flip) | Chrissy Houlahan (D) (flip) |
| Pennsylvania 7 | D+1 | (Vacant) (Note: Charlie Dent (R) resigned in May, Susan Wild (D) won a simultaneous special election to fill the remainder of Dent's term.) | – | Lean D (flip) | Lean D (flip) | Lean D (flip) | Lean D (flip) | Lean D (flip) | Safe D (flip) | Susan Wild (D) (flip) |
| Pennsylvania 8 | R+1 | Matt Cartwright (D) | – | Likely D | Lean D | Likely D | Likely D | Likely D | Safe D | Matt Cartwright (D) |
| Pennsylvania 10 | R+6 | Scott Perry (R) | – | Tossup | Lean R | Lean R | Tossup | Lean R | Lean R | Scott Perry (R) |
| Pennsylvania 11 | R+14 | Lloyd Smucker (R) | – | Safe R | Safe R | Safe R | Safe R | Safe R | Likely R | Lloyd Smucker (R) |
| Pennsylvania 14 | R+14 | Conor Lamb (D) (running in 17th district) | – | Likely R (flip) | Likely R (flip) | Safe R (flip) | Likely R (flip) | Safe R (flip) | Safe R (flip) | Guy Reschenthaler (R) (flip) |
| Pennsylvania 16 | R+8 | Mike Kelly (R) | – | Lean R | Likely R | Lean R | Tossup | Lean R | Likely R | Mike Kelly (R) |
| Pennsylvania 17 | R+3 | Keith Rothfus (R) | – | Likely D (flip) | Lean D (flip) | Likely D (flip) | Likely D (flip) | Likely D (flip) | Safe D (flip) | Conor Lamb (D) (flip) |
| South Carolina 1 | R+10 | Mark Sanford (R) (lost renomination) | 58.6% R | Lean R | Likely R | Lean R | Lean R | Lean R | Likely R | Joe Cunningham (D) (flip) |
| Texas 2 | R+11 | Ted Poe (R) (retiring) | 60.6% R | Likely R | Safe R | Likely R | Safe R | Likely R | Likely R | Dan Crenshaw (R) |
| Texas 6 | R+9 | Joe Barton (R) (retiring) | 58.3% R | Likely R | Safe R | Likely R | Safe R | Safe R | Likely R | Ron Wright (R) |
| Texas 7 | R+7 | John Culberson (R) | 56.2% R | Tossup | Tilt R | Lean R | Tossup | Tossup | Tossup | Lizzie Fletcher (D) (flip) |
| Texas 10 | R+9 | Michael McCaul (R) | 57.3% R | Likely R | Safe R | Safe R | Safe R | Safe R | Likely R | Michael McCaul (R) |
| Texas 21 | R+10 | Lamar Smith (R) (retiring) | 57.0% R | Likely R | Likely R | Likely R | Likely R | Likely R | Likely R | Chip Roy (R) |
| Texas 22 | R+10 | Pete Olson (R) | 59.5% R | Lean R | Safe R | Likely R | Likely R | Safe R | Likely R | Pete Olson (R) |
| Texas 23 | R+1 | Will Hurd (R) | 48.3% R | Lean R | Lean R | Lean R | Lean R | Lean R | Likely R | Will Hurd (R) |
| Texas 24 | R+9 | Kenny Marchant (R) | 56.2% R | Likely R | Safe R | Safe R | Safe R | Safe R | Safe R | Kenny Marchant (R) |
| Texas 25 | R+11 | Roger Williams (R) | 58.3% R | Safe R | Safe R | Safe R | Safe R | Safe R | Likely R | Roger Williams (R) |
| Texas 31 | R+10 | John Carter (R) | 58.4% R | Likely R | Likely R | Likely R | Safe R | Likely R | Likely R | John Carter (R) |
| Texas 32 | R+5 | Pete Sessions (R) | 71.1% R | Tossup | Tossup | Lean D (flip) | Tossup | Tossup | Lean R | Colin Allred (D) (flip) |
| Utah 4 | R+13 | Mia Love (R) | 53.8% R | Tossup | Tossup | Lean D (flip) | Tossup | Tossup | Lean D (flip) | Ben McAdams (D) (flip) |
| Virginia 2 | R+3 | Scott Taylor (R) | 61.3% R | Tossup | Tilt R | Lean D (flip) | Lean R | Tossup | Lean R | Elaine Luria (D) (flip) |
| Virginia 5 | R+6 | Tom Garrett (R) (retiring) | 58.2% R | Lean R | Likely R | Lean R | Tossup | Lean R | Tossup | Denver Riggleman (R) |
| Virginia 7 | R+6 | Dave Brat (R) | 57.5% R | Tossup | Tossup | Lean D (flip) | Tossup | Tossup | Tossup | Abigail Spanberger (D) (flip) |
| Virginia 10 | D+1 | Barbara Comstock (R) | 52.7% R | Lean D (flip) | Tilt D (flip) | Lean D (flip) | Lean D (flip) | Lean D (flip) | Likely D (flip) | Jennifer Wexton (D) (flip) |
| Washington 3 | R+4 | Jaime Herrera Beutler (R) | 61.8% R | Lean R | Likely R | Lean R | Lean R | Lean R | Lean R | Jaime Herrera Beutler (R) |
| Washington 5 | R+8 | Cathy McMorris Rodgers (R) | 59.6% R | Lean R | Likely R | Lean R | Lean R | Lean R | Likely R | Cathy McMorris Rodgers (R) |
| Washington 8 | EVEN | Dave Reichert (R) (retiring) | 60.2% R | Lean D (flip) | Tossup | Lean D (flip) | Tossup | Tossup | Lean D (flip) | Kim Schrier (D) (flip) |
| West Virginia 2 | R+17 | Alex Mooney (R) | 58.2% R | Likely R | Safe R | Safe R | Safe R | Safe R | Likely R | Alex Mooney (R) |
| West Virginia 3 | R+23 | (Vacant) (Note: Evan Jenkins resigned in September 2018, seat remained vacant until the start of the next Congress) | 67.9% R | Lean R | Lean R | Lean R | Lean R | Lean R | Likely R | Carol Miller (R) |
| Wisconsin 1 | R+5 | Paul Ryan (R) (retiring) | 65.0% R | Lean R | Lean R | Lean R | Lean R | Lean R | Likely R | Bryan Steil (R) |
| Wisconsin 3 | EVEN | Ron Kind (D) | 98.9% D | Safe D | Safe D | Safe D | Likely D | Safe D | Safe D | Ron Kind (D) |
| Wisconsin 6 | R+8 | Glenn Grothman (R) | 57.2% R | Likely R | Safe R | Likely R | Safe R | Likely R | Safe R | Glenn Grothman (R) |
| Overall | | | | D - 210; R - 194; 30 tossups | D - 214; R - 202; 19 tossups | D - 228; R - 207; 0 tossups | D - 203; R - 194; 38 tossups | D - 206; R - 199; 30 tossups | D - 220; R - 197; 18 tossups | D - 235; R - 199; 1 voided |

=== Generic ballot polls ===
The following is a list of generic party ballot polls conducted in advance of the 2018 House of Representatives elections.

Polling aggregates
| Source of poll aggregation | Date updated | Dates polled | Democratic | Republican | Lead |
|---|---|---|---|---|---|
| FiveThirtyEight | Nov 6, 2018 | Until Nov 5, 2018 | 50.7% | 42.0% | +8.7% |
| RealClearPolitics | Nov 6, 2018 | Oct 13, 2018 - Nov 3, 2018 | 49.7% | 42.4% | +7.3% |
| Average | | | 50.2% | 42.2% | +8.0% |
