= Devin Nunes =

American politician (born 1973)

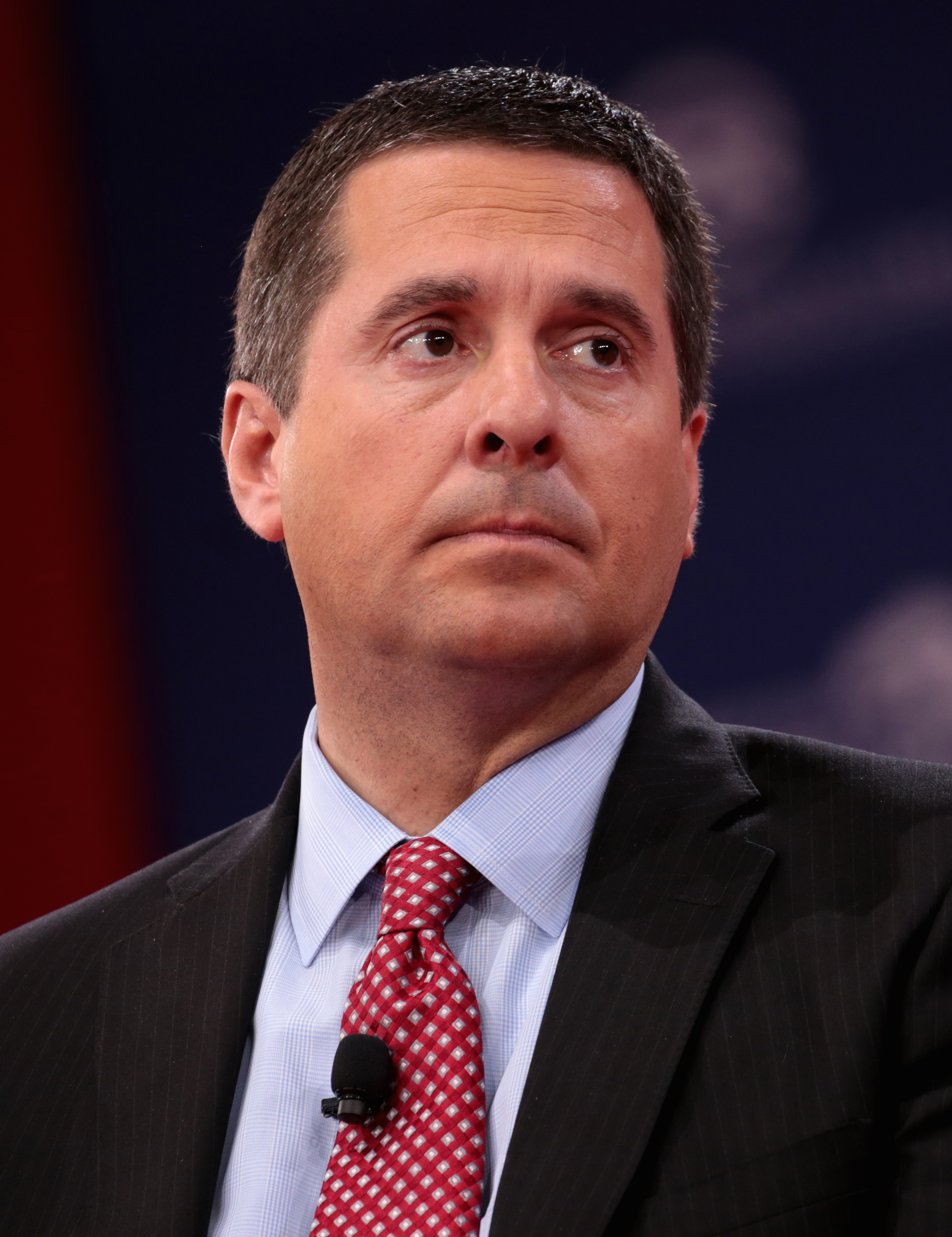
- Nunes in 2018

Chair of the President's Intelligence Advisory Board
- Incumbent
- Assumed office January 20, 2025
- President: Donald Trump
- Preceded by: James A. Winnefeld Jr.

Ranking Member of the House Intelligence Committee
- In office January 3, 2019 – January 1, 2022
- Preceded by: Adam Schiff
- Succeeded by: Mike Turner

Chair of the House Intelligence Committee
- In office January 3, 2015 – January 3, 2019
- Preceded by: Mike Rogers
- Succeeded by: Adam Schiff

Member of the U.S. House of Representatives from California
- In office January 3, 2003 – January 1, 2022
- Preceded by: Constituency established
- Succeeded by: Connie Conway
- Constituency: 21st district (2003–2013); 22nd district (2013–2022)

Personal details
- Born: Devin Gerald Nunes; October 1, 1973 (age 53) Tulare, California, U.S.
- Party: Republican
- Spouse: Elizabeth Tamariz (m. 2003)
- Children: 3
- Education: College of the Sequoias (AA); California Polytechnic State University, San Luis Obispo (BS, MS)
- Awards: Grand Officer of the Order of Prince Henry (2013); Commander of the Order of the Star of Romania (2017); Presidential Medal of Freedom (2021)
- Nunes's voice Nunes opening a House Intelligence Committee hearing on the annual worldwide threat assessment Recorded February 25, 2016

Devin Gerald Nunes GOIH (/ˈnuːnɛs/; born October 1, 1973) is an American businessman and politician who has served as the chair of the President's Intelligence Advisory Board since January 20, 2025. A member of the Republican Party, Nunes was first the U.S. representative for California's 21st congressional district from 2003 to 2013, and then California's 22nd congressional district from 2013 to 2022. After leaving Congress, Nunes was the chief executive officer of the Trump Media & Technology Group (TMTG) from January 2022 to April 2026.

Nunes was the chair of the House Intelligence Committee from 2015 to 2019. He was also a member of President Donald Trump's first transition team. Nunes's former district, numbered as the 21st from 2003 to 2013 and as the 22nd after redistricting, was in the San Joaquin Valley and included most of western Tulare County and much of eastern Fresno County.

In March 2017, the U.S. House intelligence committee, which Nunes chaired at the time, launched an investigation into possible Russian interference in the 2016 United States elections. In February 2018, Nunes publicly released a four-page memorandum alleging the Federal Bureau of Investigation (FBI) committed malfeasance in its warrant applications to spy on Trump associate Carter Page. Nunes subsequently began an investigation of the FBI and the U.S. Justice Department for allegedly abusing their powers in their investigations of Trump associates. In January 2021, Trump awarded Nunes the Presidential Medal of Freedom.

== Early life, education, and early career ==
Nunes was born on October 1, 1973, the older of two sons of Antonio L. "Anthony" Nunes Jr. and Toni Diane Nunes (née Enas). His grandfather founded Nunes & Sons, a prominent dairy operation in Tulare County.

Nunes is of three-quarters Portuguese descent, with ancestors emigrating from the Azores to California. He has one younger brother, Anthony III. In 2009, Nunes wrote in The Wall Street Journal that he became an entrepreneur at age 14 when he bought seven head of young cattle, learning quickly how to profit from his investment.

After receiving his Associate of Arts degree from the College of the Sequoias in 1993, Nunes graduated from Cal Poly San Luis Obispo with a bachelor's degree in agricultural business in 1995, and a master's degree in agriculture in 1996. After finishing school, Nunes returned to farming.

In 1996, at age 23, Nunes was elected to the College of the Sequoias Board, making him one of California's youngest community college trustees in state history. He served on the board until 2002.

In 2001, President George W. Bush appointed Nunes to serve as California State Director for the United States Department of Agriculture's Rural Development section.

== U.S. Congress ==
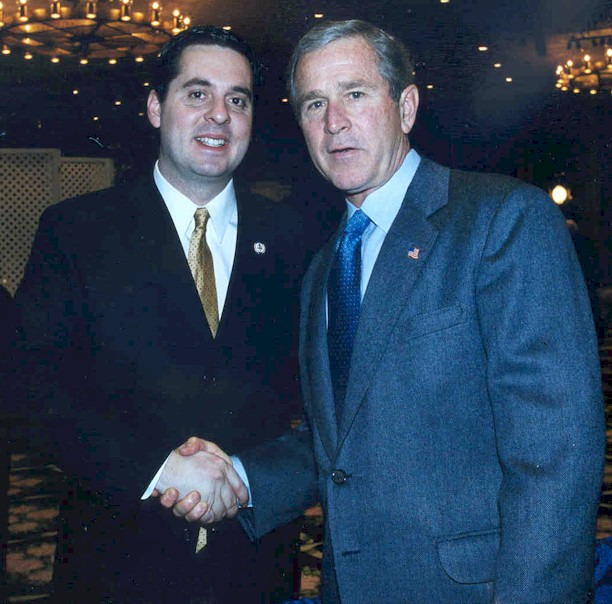
Nunes with President George W. Bush in 2003

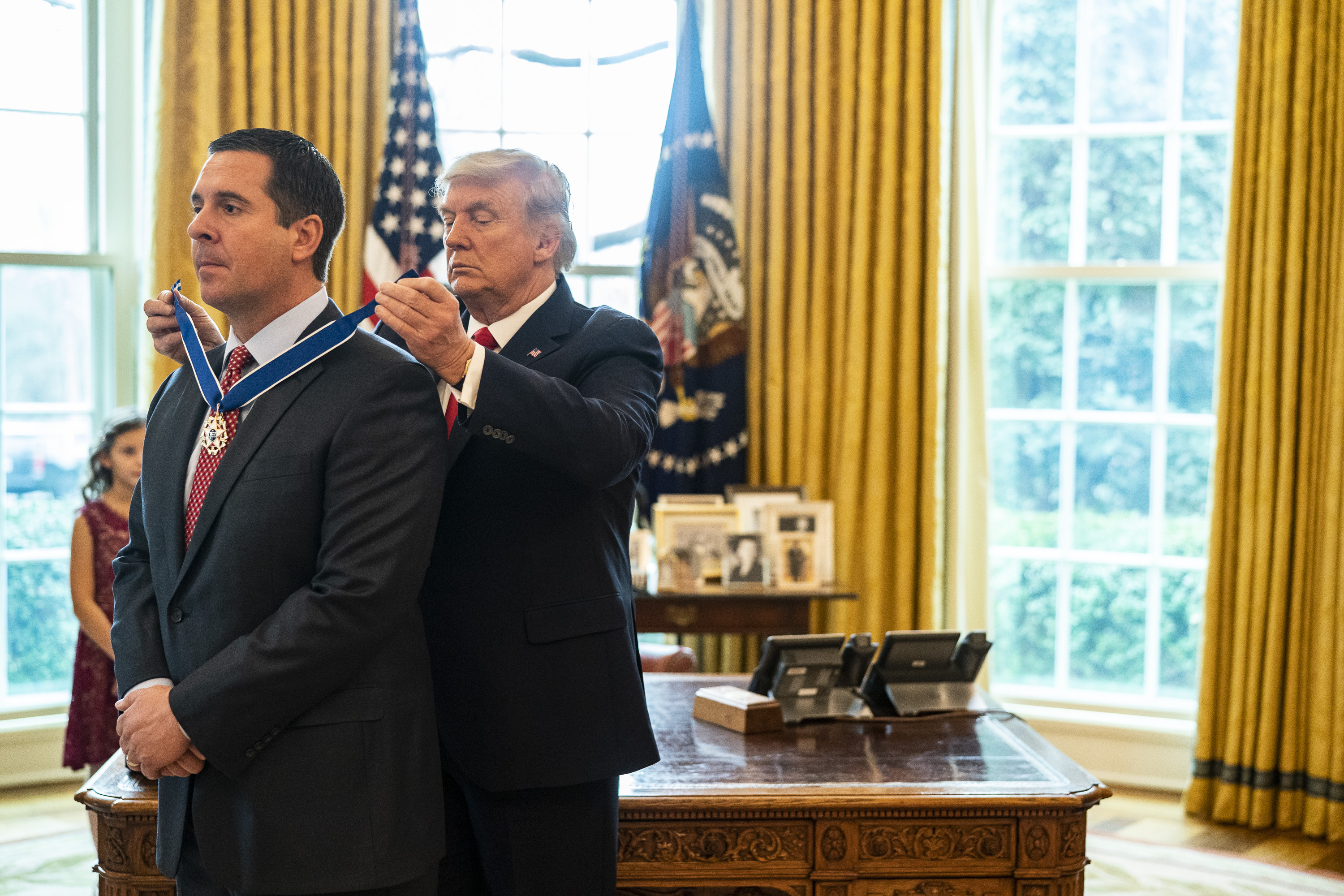
Nunes being awarded the Presidential Medal of Freedom by President Donald Trump in 2021

=== Elections ===
In 1998, Nunes entered the "top two" primary race for California's 20th congressional district seat held by Democrat Cal Dooley. He finished in third place.

In 2002, Nunes ran for the Republican nomination in the 21st congressional district, a new district created by reapportionment after the 2000 United States census. His principal opponents in the crowded seven-way primary were former Fresno mayor Jim Patterson and state Assemblyman Mike Briggs. Nunes was the only major candidate from Tulare County; Patterson and Briggs were both from Fresno. This was critical, as 58% of the district's population was in Tulare County.

Patterson and Briggs split the vote in Fresno County, allowing Nunes to win by a four-point margin over Patterson, his nearest competitor. Nunes won 46.5% of the vote in Tulare County and 28.1% of the vote in Fresno County. Nunes was also helped by a strong showing in the rural part of the district. He was endorsed by the California Farm Bureau and The Fresno Bee. The district was solidly Republican, and Nunes coasted to victory in November 2002. He was 29 years old.

Nunes faced token Democratic opposition in 2004, 2006, and 2008. He ran unopposed in the 2010 general election.

After the 2010 census, Nunes's district was renumbered the 22nd. It lost most of eastern Tulare County to the neighboring 23rd District, and now has a small plurality of Hispanic voters. Despite these changes, on paper it was no less Republican than its predecessor. Nunes was reelected with 62% of the vote in 2012, 72% in 2014, and 68% in 2016.

During the 2014 election cycle Nunes received approximately $1.4 million in political action committee (PAC) contributions. During the 2016 election cycle, he received approximately $1.6 million in campaign contributions from PACs.

In 2018, Nunes faced Democratic nominee Andrew Janz, a Fresno County prosecutor. Nunes defeated Janz with 53% of the vote to Janz's 47%, the closest race of Nunes's career.

In 2020, Nunes received 56.5% of the vote in the primary. Nunes defeated Phil Arballo in the general election on November 3, 2020.

In December 2021, Nunes resigned from the House, effective January 1, 2022, in order to join the Trump Media & Technology Group as chief executive officer.

=== Committees and caucuses ===
In 2015, Nunes became the Chairman of the House Permanent Select Committee on Intelligence.

After joining the Ways and Means Committee in 2005, Nunes became Chairman of the Trade Subcommittee in 2013 and Republican Leader of the Health Subcommittee in 2021.

As co-chair of the U.S.–Mexico Friendship Caucus, he and Democratic Whip Steny Hoyer met with President Felipe Calderón of Mexico in April 2012.

Nunes was a member of the House Baltic Caucus and the U.S.-Japan Caucus.

==== 112th Congress ====
- House Permanent Select Committee on Intelligence
- Committee on Ways and Means
  - Subcommittee on Trade
  - Subcommittee on Health

==== 114th and 115th Congress ====
- House Permanent Select Committee on Intelligence (chair)
- Committee on Ways and Means

==== 116th and 117th Congress ====
- House Permanent Select Committee on Intelligence (Ranking Member)
- Committee on Ways and Means

== Political positions ==
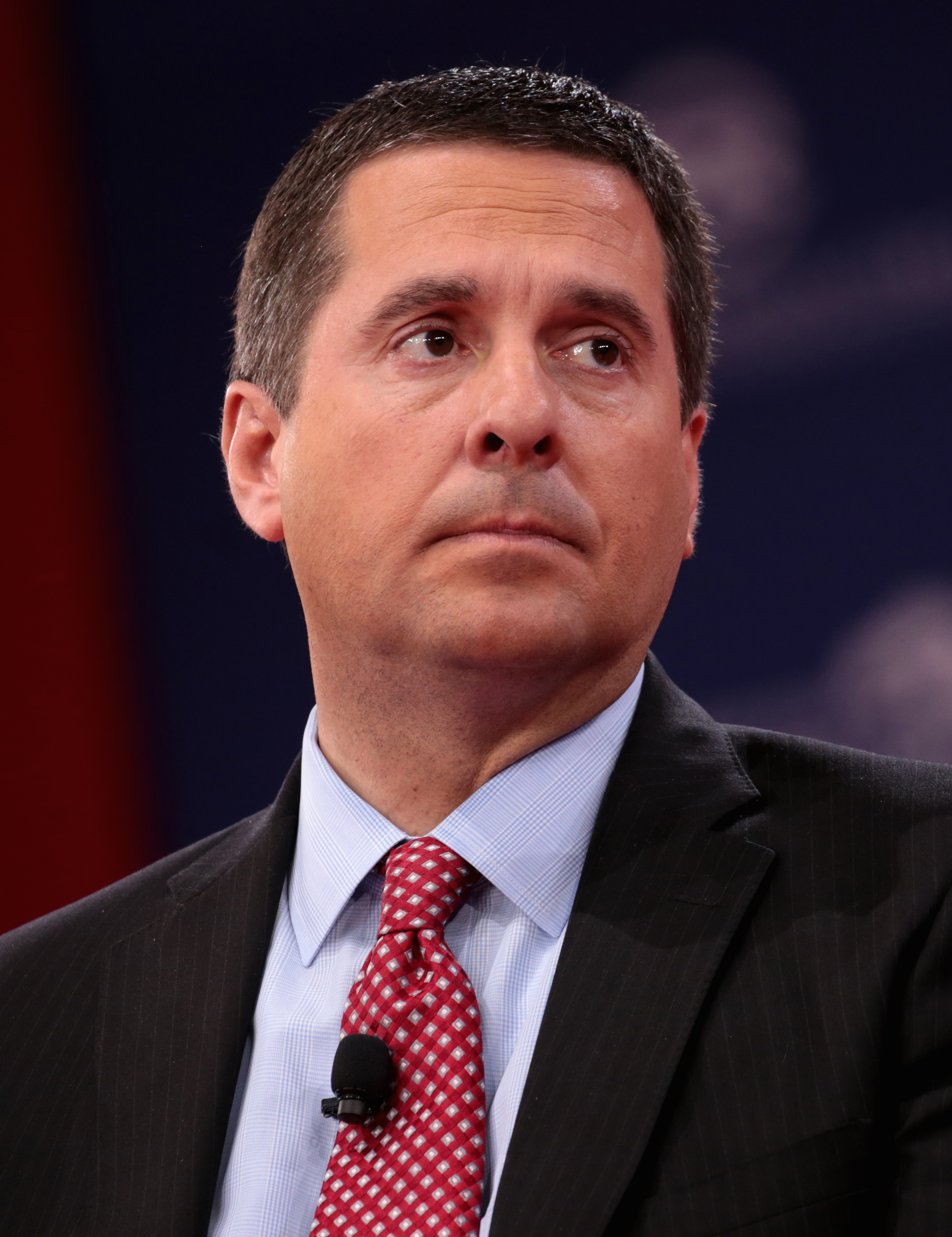
Nunes at CPAC in 2018

During the presidency of Donald Trump, Nunes voted in line with the president's stated position 96.2% of the time. As of December 2021, Nunes had voted in line with Joe Biden's stated position 11% of the time.

=== Energy ===
On July 28, 2010, Nunes introduced H.R. 5899, "A Roadmap for America's Energy Future", which would have accelerated the exploration and production of fossil fuel, supported the rapid development of market-based alternative energy supplies, and expanded the number of nuclear reactors from 104 to 300 over the next thirty years. Kimberley Strassel of The Wall Street Journal wrote, "It's a bill designed to produce energy, not restrict it" with "no freebies", and "offers a competitive twist to government support of renewable energy."

=== Environment ===
Nunes wrote in his book Restoring the Republic that environmental lobbyists were "followers of neo-Marxist, socialist, Maoist or Communist ideals."

In February 2014, during a drought in California, Nunes rejected any link to global warming, claiming "Global warming is nonsense." He described the state's water shortages as a "man-made drought" due to water restrictions from the Endangered Species Act of 1973 and other environmental regulations that have seen water allocations decline dramatically even in non-drought years.

He criticized the federal government for shutting off portions of California's system of water irrigation and storage and diverting water from farmers into a program for freshwater salmon and the delta smelt. Nunes co-sponsored the Sacramento-San Joaquin Valley Emergency Water Delivery Act to reduce California water shortages by reducing environmental regulations. He also co-sponsored the California Emergency Drought Relief Act. The bills passed the House of Representatives in February 2014 and December 2014 respectively, but were not voted on by the Senate.

=== Fiscal policy ===
On January 27, 2010, Nunes co-sponsored H.R. 4529, Roadmap for America's Future Act of 2010, the Republican Party's budget proposal.

On December 2, 2010, Nunes introduced H.R. 6484, the Public Employee Pension Transparency Act, which would "provide for reporting and disclosure by State and local public employee retirement pension plans," but it never received a vote.

Nunes has long been a proponent of a consumption tax model and has been influenced by David Bradford. In 2016, he introduced the American Business Competitiveness Act (H.R. 4377), known as the ABC Act, a "cash-flow tax plan" featuring full same-year expensing and a reduction of the highest rate for federal corporate income tax rate to 25%. Nunes's proposal was influential among House Republicans with conservative economist Douglas Holtz-Eakin stating Nunes had "a tremendous impact on the debate" for a non-chairman. His business expensing provision was incorporated in the Tax Cuts and Jobs Act of 2017.

In April 2016, Nunes voted for the Preventing IRS Abuse and Protecting Free Speech Act, a bill that would prevent the IRS from accessing the names of donors to nonprofit organizations.

Nunes voted in support of the Tax Cuts and Jobs Act of 2017.

=== Health care ===
In 2009, Nunes co-authored the "Patients' Choice Act" with Paul Ryan (R-WI) in the House, and Tom Coburn (R-OK) and Richard Burr (R-NC) in the Senate. The bill would have established a system of state health insurance exchanges and amended the Internal Revenue Code to allow a refundable tax credit for qualified health care insurance coverage. It also proposed to absorb Medicaid programs into the exchange system. The Patients' Choice Act was incorporated into the "Roadmap for America's Future Act of 2010".

Nunes opposes the Affordable Care Act and has said it cannot be fixed. In 2017 he voted to repeal it.

Nunes was skeptical of government-ordered shutdowns due to the COVID-19 pandemic, describing California's decision to close schools to halt the spread of coronavirus as "way overkill." During early March 2020, near the beginning of the COVID-19 pandemic, Nunes emphasized keeping the economy and family life functioning by encouraging healthy families to go out to local restaurants. He later clarified that this comment was intended for drive-through restaurants. In mid-march 2020, Nunes predicted that the pandemic would be under control by Easter.

=== Immigration and refugees ===
Nunes supported President Trump's Executive Order 13769 imposing a temporary ban on entry into the United States by citizens of seven Muslim-majority countries, claiming it was "a common-sense security measure to prevent terror attacks on the homeland".

=== Intelligence Committee ===
Nunes opposed the Joint Comprehensive Plan of Action, an international agreement that the U.S. and other major world powers negotiated with Iran, under which Iran was granted partial sanctions relief in exchange for limits on and monitoring of its nuclear activities.

Nunes urged the Obama Administration to declassify the Abbottabad documents, which were al-Qaeda records captured by U.S. forces during the attack on Osama bin Laden's compound in Pakistan. The Trump Administration eventually released nearly half a million files from the collection. New York Times terrorism reporter Rukmini Callimachi said the documents contradicted claims by Obama Administration officials that during their administration, al Qaeda had been largely decimated and that bin Laden was isolated.

Paul Ryan vacated the chairmanship of the Ways and Means Committee when he replaced John Boehner as Speaker of the House of Representatives. Ryan asked Nunes to stay on the Intelligence Committee, and Nunes complied.

=== Surveillance ===
In January 2019, Congress passed a bill Nunes supported, which extends Section 702 of the Foreign Intelligence Surveillance Act (FISA) until 2023, and Trump signed it into law that month. FISA Section 702 allows the National Security Agency to conduct searches of foreigners' communications without a warrant. The process incidentally collects information from Americans. Nunes lauded the bill's passing, stating the bill has "new, rigorous measures to protect Americans' privacy and to ensure the program is used properly to target foreign terrorists, weapons proliferators, and other threats to Americans' safety and security."

=== Armenia–Azerbaijan conflict ===
Nunes accused Turkey of inciting the conflict between Armenia and Azerbaijan over the disputed region of Nagorno-Karabakh. On October 1, 2020, he co-signed a letter to Secretary of State Mike Pompeo that condemned Azerbaijan's offensive operations against Nagorno-Karabakh, denounced Turkey's role in the conflict and called for an immediate ceasefire.

=== Transportation ===
California State Route 99 is a highway running north–south that branches from Interstate 5 at the community of Wheeler Ridge in Kern County and continues northward through the Central Valley until it connects with Interstate 5 again at Red Bluff in Tehama County. In 2005 Nunes introduced H.R. 99, which designated State Route 99 as a congressional High Priority Corridor. The bill also provided federal authorization for Highway 99 to become part of the Interstate Highway System. On February 17, 2011, Nunes introduced H.R. 761, the "San Joaquin Valley Transportation Enhancement Act", which would give the State of California the option to redirect federal high-speed rail funds to finance improvements to Highway 99. H.R. 761 was cosponsored by Jeff Denham (R-CA) and House Majority Whip Kevin McCarthy (R-CA).

=== U.S. base in Portugal ===
In 2015, Nunes clashed with the Pentagon over a U.S. base in the Azores, Portugal. He proposed relocating Africa Command and European Command intelligence centers to an existing American facility in the Azores, contrary to plans by Pentagon and NATO to create a larger intelligence "fusion" facility in the United Kingdom, maintaining that this would save money because of the Azores' lower living and construction costs. The Pentagon responded by stating "Moving to Lajes Field is very expensive and living is expensive as well." The Government Accountability Office (GAO) later found the Department of Defense had provided inaccurate information to Congress, did not correct the errors in a timely manner, and used deficient practices when providing information to Congress in regard to Nunes' inquiries about the basing issue.

== Legal issues ==
=== Comments about other politicians ===
During the debate over the Affordable Health Care Act in the House of Representatives, Nunes said of then-Speaker Nancy Pelosi, "For most of the 20th century people fled the ghost of communist dictators and now you are bringing the ghosts back into this chamber." He has also had a long-running dispute with another San Francisco Bay-area Democrat, Senator Dianne Feinstein, over California water policy and other issues, even running a series of advertisements against her in California.

Nunes's criticisms have not been limited to liberals or the Obama administration. During the October 2013 budget standoff, Nunes called certain members of his own Republican Conference who favored a government shutdown "lemmings with suicide vests," believing a shutdown would hurt the Republican Party while failing in its goal of eliminating Obamacare. "It's kind of an insult to lemmings to call them lemmings" because of their tactics, he said.

In May 2014, Nunes criticized fellow Republican Justin Amash over his votes on NSA surveillance.

=== Role in Trump–Russia investigation ===
As Chairman of the House Intelligence Committee, Nunes was an early skeptic of media reports that the Trump Administration had colluded with Russia to interfere in the 2016 presidential elections. He believed that leaders of the U.S. Intelligence Community were using their investigations of Russian hacking to undermine the incoming Trump Administration. In December 2016, he issued a press release accusing Intelligence Community directors of withholding information on Russian hacking from the House Intelligence Committee, asserting that "intransigence in sharing intelligence with Congress can enable the manipulation of intelligence for political purposes."

Nunes also denounced a series of major leaks of classified information, including calls between National Security Advisor Michael Flynn and Russian Ambassador Sergey Kislyak, between Trump and Mexican President Enrique Nieto, and between Trump and Australian Prime Minister Malcolm Turnbull. In February 2017, Nunes insisted that while "major laws have been broken" through these leaks and the unmasking of Flynn's name in intelligence reports, he had not seen any evidence that Trump campaign officials had colluded with Russians, and stated he would not lead a "witch hunt" against American citizens based on unverified media reports.

At a March 15, 2017 press conference, Nunes denied a claim by Trump that President Obama had wiretapped Trump Tower, but Nunes said he wanted to find out whether other surveillance methods had been used against Trump or his associates. It was later revealed that the Obama Administration had used surveillance against Trump associates, including unmaskings, FISA surveillance, the use of government informants, and secretly accessing phone records.

On March 22, 2017, Nunes announced that he had received information that the communications of "some members of Trump's transition team, including potentially the president himself" had been "incidentally collected" by the intelligence community. The names of these individuals, said Nunes were unmasked and "widely disseminated" throughout the intelligence community. He added that it was legal FISA surveillance, and unrelated to Russia. Congress later disclosed that President Obama's U.S. Ambassador to the United Nations, Samantha Power, had unmasked nearly 300 people and that thirty nine Obama Administration officials, including Power, had unmasked Michael Flynn's name in intelligence reports. It was also revealed that Obama Administration National Security Advisor Susan Rice had unmasked Trump associates, even though she had responded to Nunes' announcement that Obama officials had unmasked Trump associates by declaring, "I know nothing about this. I was surprised to see reports from Chairman Nunes on that count today."

Nunes had met his source for the information one day earlier at the White House grounds, with a spokesman for Nunes claiming this provided "a secure location" to view the material. The New York Times later reported that his sources were two White House officials, while The Washington Post reported that a third man, National Security Council lawyer John Eisenberg, was also involved.

Nunes' handling of the intercepted-communications disclosure drew sharp criticism from Democrats and some Republicans, including calls for his recusal from the House investigation. In March 2017, Nunes canceled a planned public hearing with former senior officials in favor of a classified session with FBI director James Comey and NSA director Mike Rogers, a move Democrats said was intended to protect the White House. The Los Angeles Times editorial board wrote that they believed that Nunes's involvement in the investigation was "threatening the credibility of the probe".

On April 6, 2017, Nunes temporarily stepped aside from leading the Russia investigation while the House Ethics Committee investigated whether he had "made unauthorized disclosures of classified information, in violation of House Rules, law, regulations, or other standards of conduct" in his March press conference. He called the charges "entirely false and politically motivated". On December 8, 2017, the Ethic Committee cleared Nunes of the allegations. In May 2017, Nunes issued three subpoenas seeking documents about former Obama administration officials who requested the unmasking of Trump aides, which led to renewed accusations of colluding with the White House to undercut the Russia probe. According to Politico, in July 2017 an aide to Nunes sent a pair of Republican staffers to London to contact Christopher Steele, though a congressional source said the aides were trying to contact Steele's lawyer, not Steele himself.

Nunes increasingly focused his investigations on abuses allegedly committed as part of the Intelligence Community's investigation of the Trump-Russia collusion allegations. He subpoenaed the financial records of Fusion GPS, the opposition research company that paid Christopher Steele to compose the Steele dossier, to determine where funding for the dossier originated. The Steele dossier was a collection of unverified reports of Trump-Russian collusion compiled and provided to the media and to government officials by Christopher Steele, a former British spy who opposed Trump. Dossier allegations were cited to support the 2017 Intelligence Community Assessment of Russian meddling and the surveillance warrant application on Trump associate Carter Page, and were briefed to President Trump by FBI Director Comey. The primary source Steele used to collect information for the dossier, Igor Danchenko, told the FBI he had "no proof" to support the Trump-Russia collusion allegations he passed to Steele, and his information was "just talk," "word of mouth," "hearsay," "conversation...with friends over beers," and statements "made in jest."

Following court challenges by Fusion GPS, on October 28, 2017, Fusion GPS and Nunes reached an agreement for the company to disclose its financial records. Four days before the agreement was announced, media reports revealed that the Hillary Clinton Campaign and the Democratic National Committee had funded the Steele dossier by funneling payments to Fusion GPS through the law firm Perkins Coie.

In December 2017, the media reported that Peter Strzok, a top FBI investigator into the Hillary Clinton email investigation and the Trump-Russia collusion investigation, and later the lead investigator of the Trump-Russia collusion for independent counsel Robert Mueller, had been removed from the Mueller team after sharing text messages with his mistress, FBI attorney Lisa Page, that disparaged Trump and supported Clinton. A text message to Page was later published in which Strzok vowed to stop Trump from getting elected president. Responding to the texts, Nunes criticized the FBI and Department of Justice for refusing prior demands from the House Intelligence Committee to explain why Strzok had been removed from the Mueller team stating, "[T]he FBI and DOJ engaged in a willful attempt to thwart Congress' constitutional oversight responsibility. This is part of a months-long pattern by the DOJ and FBI of stonewalling and obstructing this Committee's oversight work, particularly oversight of their use of the Steele dossier. At this point, these agencies should be investigating themselves."

In January 2018, The Atlantic cited three anonymous congressional sources describing that the Ethics Committee was never able to obtain the classified information it was investigating regarding Nunes's case. According to anonymous sources, in August 2018, Nunes traveled to London in an attempt to meet with the heads of MI5, MI6, and GCHQ for information about Steele, but they declined meeting with him.

In February 2018, Nunes released a four-page memorandum, the Nunes Memo, alleging that the FBI's 2016 surveillance warrant application on Carter Page, a former advisor to the Trump campaign, was defective and politically motivated, especially due to its reliance on Steele dossier allegations. House Intelligence Committee Ranking Member Adam Schiff issued a rebuttal memo justifying the warrant application and declaring that the Steele dossier allegations were properly vetted and the warrant had no material omissions.

A December 2019 assessment by Department of Justice Inspector General Michael Horowitz, described by CNN as a "scathing report", found seventeen significant errors and omissions in the Carter Page warrant. As a result, Foreign Intelligence Surveillance Court presiding judge Rosemary Collyer accused the FBI of having misled the court, and the Department of Justice invalidated two of four warrants on Carter Page.

On July 23, 2025, Director of National Intelligence Tulsi Gabbard declassified a House Intelligence Committee report on the composition of the January 2017 Intelligence Community Assessment on Russian meddling in the 2016 presidential elections. Compiled during Nunes' chairmanship of the Committee, the report presented evidence contradicting the ICA's assessment that Russian President Vladimir Putin favored Donald Trump over Hillary Clinton in the 2016 presidential election. Specifically, the report found that CIA Director John Brennan relied on substandard sources for this assessment, used unverified allegations from the Steele dossier, excluded "significant intelligence" that undermined the assessment, and overruled senior CIA officers who disagreed with the assessment. Gabbard declared that the report "details how the Obama Administration manufactured an intelligence Community Assessment they knew was false."

=== Role in Trump impeachment inquiry ===
As the top Republican ("Ranking Member") on the House Intelligence Committee, Nunes was a key player in the Trump impeachment inquiry. During the November 2019 public hearings, he delivered the opening statement for the GOP minority. Nunes focused his remarks on what he described as the unfairness of the Democrat-run impeachment process, the Democrats' lack of credibility after promoting the "Russia collusion hoax," revelations of prior coordination between the "whistleblower" and Democratic staff members of the House Intelligence Committee, and Democrats sabotaging attempts by Committee Republicans to gather information on Hunter Biden's paid position on the board of Ukrainian energy company Burisma. Overall, he denounced the impeachment as an attempt to overturn the results of the 2016 elections. Nunes also attempted to identify the whistle-blower whose complaint played a part in launching the impeachment inquiry.

In November 2019, Rudy Giuliani's associate Lev Parnas claimed he had helped Nunes arrange a meeting in Vienna with disgraced former Ukrainian prosecutor-general Victor Shokin in an effort to procure politically embarrassing "dirt" on former Vice President Joe Biden. In a lawsuit against CNN, Nunes declared that he never met Shokin and did not go to Vienna. Shokin similarly denied ever meeting Nunes, with a source close to Shokin telling the Washington Post that Shokin had never heard of Nunes.

Parnas' attorney has said that Nunes and his aide Derek Harvey met with Parnas several times for updates on efforts to gather derogatory information about Joe Biden to promote Ukraine-related conspiracy theories and that Nunes timed a post-2018 election trip to avoid disclosure to Democratic colleagues. Nunes refused to answer media questions about his travels and later accused CNN and Daily Beast of criminal conduct for reporting on the matter, and filed a defamation suit against CNN over its coverage, which was dismissed in 2021. Parnas stated he was prepared to testify that Nunes's staff canceled a planned 2019 trip to Ukraine when they realized it would have to be reported to the House Intelligence chair Adam Schiff, potentially implicating Nunes's office in the same Ukraine pressure campaign under investigation. The House Intelligence's impeachment report subsequently released call records showing frequent contacts among Nunes, Rudy Giuliani and Parnas during key moments in that effort, prompting Democrats to call for an ethics inquiry and raising questions about whether Nunes was acting as an investigator or a participant. Nunes later acknowledged speaking to Parnas, calling the conversation "normal, standard operating procedure."

On June 29, 2022, Parnas was sentenced to 20 months in prison for conspiring to make illegal political contributions and straw donations, participating in a wire fraud conspiracy, and making false statements and falsifying records.

=== Defamation lawsuits filed by Nunes ===
Nunes, co-sponsored the "Discouraging Frivolous Lawsuits Act" and has filed 11 defamation lawsuits between 2019 and 2023, including a $435 million claim against CNN that was dismissed in 2021. Legal experts have categorized many of these actions as Strategic Lawsuits Against Public Participation (SLAPPs) that are unlikely to succeed, with many cases either thrown out by courts or voluntarily withdrawn.

In March 2019, Nunes sued Twitter, consultant Liz Mair, her firm, and the parody accounts "Devin Nunes's Mom" and "Devin Nunes's Cow" for defamation seeking $250 million, but a judge later held Twitter immune under Section 230 and dismissed his related claims against Mair in 2021. In April 2019, Nunes filed a $150 million defamation suit in Virginia against the McClatchy Company and others over a Fresno Bee story linking him to a winery lawsuit involving a 2015 yacht party, then voluntarily withdrew the case in 2020 due to McClatchy filing for bankruptcy. In August 2019, Nunes sued a group of activists who had challenged his use of "farmer" as his ballot occupation, but he withdrew the suit later that year. In September 2019, Nunes sued journalist Ryan Lizza and Hearst Magazines over a 2018 Esquire article about his family's dairy operation moving to Iowa, but the suit was dismissed after courts found the challenged reporting essentially accurate. Also in September 2019, Nunes sued the Campaign for Accountability and Fusion GPS alleging they conspired to obstruct his investigation of the Steele dossier, a claim a federal court dismissed in 2020. On December 31, 2019, Nune's attorney sent Representative Ted Lieu a letter threatening a defamation suit over Lieu's comments about Nunes and Lev Parnas, to which Lieu publicly responded by inviting such litigation.

In February 2021, the Campaign for Accountability filed a House ethics complaint after Nunes and several other Republicans used pandemic-related proxy voting while attending the Conservative Political Action Conference. In August 2021, Nunes sued NBCUniversal over statements made by Rachel Maddow on MSNBC; in 2022, a judge dismissed all but one claim, allowing the case to proceed narrowly on a single allegation found to plausibly allege actual malice.

In November 2022, Nunes filed a defamation suit in Florida against CNN over statements made on an October 31, 2022 segment, but the case was dismissed on jurisdictional grounds and his appeal was rejected after his counsel failed to respond.

In April 2023, Nunes sued The Guardian and former Trump Media executive Will Wilkerson alleging defamation over a report that federal investigators had examined Trump Media for possible money laundering.

== Personal life ==
Nunes married Elizabeth Nunes (née Tamariz), an elementary school teacher, in 2003. They have three daughters. Nunes is a practicing Catholic, and attends Mass in Tulare.

He wrote a foreword for the 2012 edition of the 1951 novel Home Is An Island by Portuguese-American author Alfred Lewis. It was published by Tagus Press, an imprint of the Center for Portuguese Culture and Studies at the University of Massachusetts at Dartmouth.

In 2026, Nunes runs a "tasting room (wine bar) in Pismo Beach called the Nunes Wine Company", partnering with winemaker and friend Mike Sinor, with Portuguese and Bordeaux varietals grown in San Luis Obispo County, California.

== Honors ==
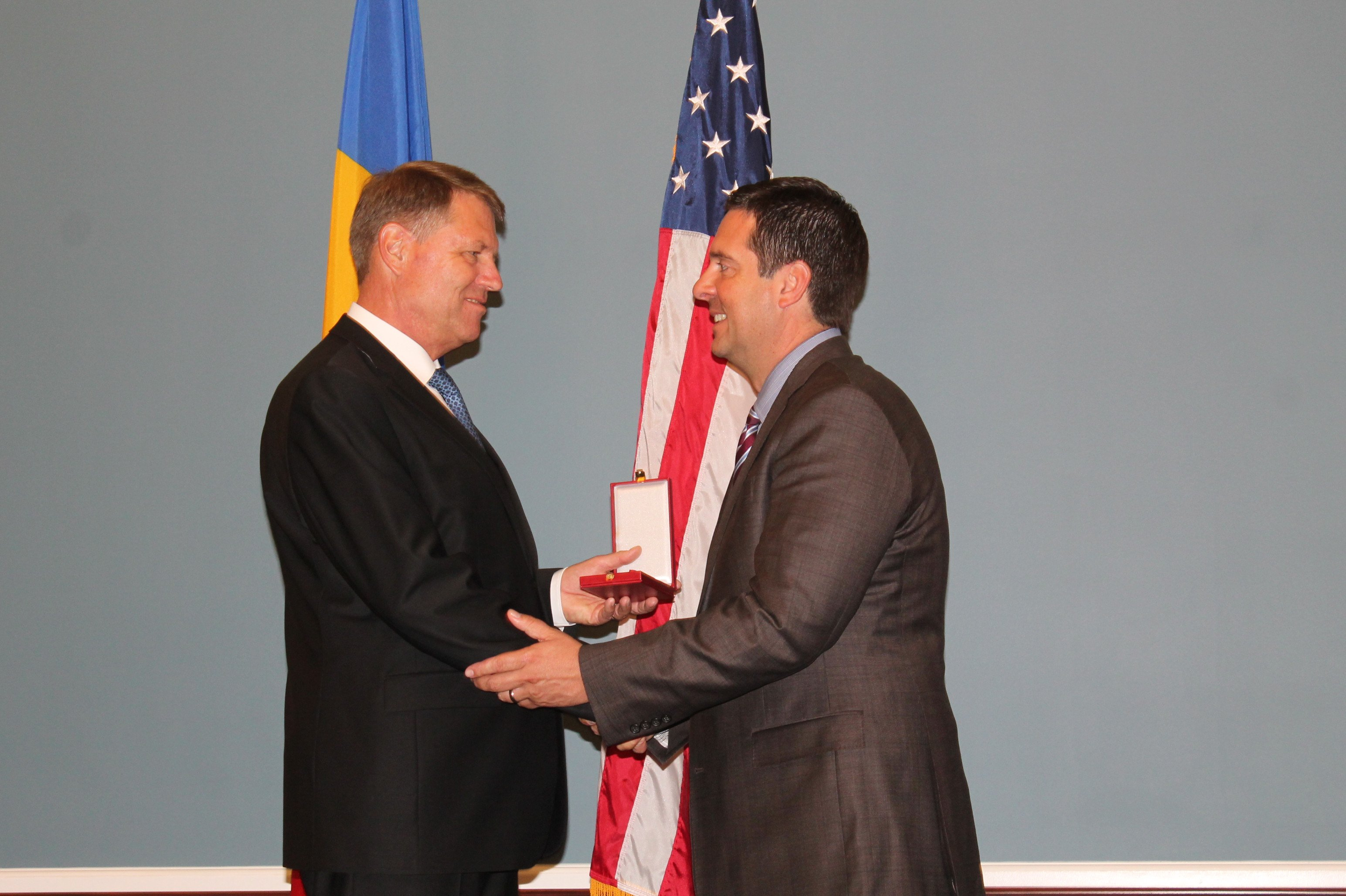
Nunes being awarded the Order of the Star of Romania by Klaus Iohannis in 2017

President Donald Trump awarded Nunes the Presidential Medal of Freedom on January 4, 2021. In a press release, the Trump White House lauded Nunes for exposing illegal surveillance by the Obama administration of the Trump campaign, stating, "Congressman Nunes pursued the Russia Hoax at great personal risk and never stopped standing up for the truth. He had the fortitude to take on the media, the FBI, the Intelligence Community, the Democrat Party, foreign spies, and the full power of the Deep State."

Nunes has received the following foreign honors:

Grand-Officer of the Order of Prince Henry, Portugal (June 7, 2013)
Commander of the Order of the Star of Romania, Romania (June 8, 2017)

U.S. House of Representatives
| Preceded by Bill Thomas | Member of the U.S. House of Representatives from California's 21st congressional district 2003–2013 | Succeeded by David Valadao |
| Preceded by Kevin McCarthy | Member of the U.S. House of Representatives from California's 22nd congressional district 2013–2022 | Succeeded by Connie Conway |
| Preceded by Mike Rogers | Chair of the House Intelligence Committee; 2015–2019 | Succeeded by Adam Schiff |
| Preceded by Adam Schiff | Ranking Member of the House Intelligence Committee; 2019–2022 | Succeeded by Mike Turner |
U.S. order of precedence (ceremonial)
| Preceded by Mike Honda as Former U.S. Representative | Order of precedence of the United States as Former U.S. Representative | Succeeded by Jerry McNerney as Former U.S. Representative |
