= California's 21st congressional district =

U.S. House district for California

Coordinates: 36.5°N 119°W

- Interactive map of district boundaries
- Representative: Jim Costa; D–Fresno
- Population (2025): 773,361
- Median household income: $65,621
- Ethnicity: 64.3% Hispanic; 17.9% White; 9.8% Asian; 4.6% Black; 2.2% Two or more races; 1.1% other
- Cook PVI: D+4

California's 21st congressional district (or CA-21) is a congressional district in the U.S. state of California. It is located in the San Joaquin Valley and includes parts of Fresno County and Tulare County. Cities in the district include the majority of Fresno, the north side of Visalia, and all of Sanger, Selma, Kingsburg, Parlier, Reedley, Orange Cove, Dinuba, Orosi, Cutler, Farmersville, Woodlake and Exeter. The district is currently represented by Democrat Jim Costa.

== Demographics ==
According to the APM Research Lab's Voter Profile Tools (featuring the U.S. Census Bureau's 2019 American Community Survey), the district contained about 377,000 potential voters (citizens, age 18+). Of these, 63% are Latino, while 26% are White. Immigrants make up 16% of the district's potential voters. Median income among households (with one or more potential voter) in the district is about $51,500, while 15% of households live below the poverty line. As for the educational attainment of potential voters in the district, 23% of those 25 and older have not earned a high school degree, while 12% hold a bachelor's or higher degree.

== Recent election results from statewide races ==
=== 2023–2027 boundaries ===
Year	Office	Results
2008	President	Obama 58% - 41%
2010	Governor	Brown 49% - 45%
2010	Lt. Governor	Maldonado 50% - 40%
2010	Secretary of State	Bowen 48% - 43%
2010	Attorney General	Cooley 49% - 42%
2010	Treasurer	Lockyer 53% - 40%
2010	Controller	Chiang 55% - 37%
2012	President	Obama 58% - 40%
2014	Governor	Brown 54% - 46%
2016	President	Clinton 58% - 36%
2018	Governor	Newsom 56% - 44%
2018	Attorney General	Becerra 59% - 41%
2020	President	Biden 59% - 39%
2022	Senate (Reg.)	Padilla 53% - 47%
2022	Governor	Newsom 51% - 49%
2022	Lt. Governor	Kounalakis 52% - 48%
2022	Secretary of State	Weber 53% - 47%
2022	Attorney General	Bonta 52% - 48%
2022	Treasurer	Ma 52% - 48%
2022	Controller	Chen 51% - 49%
2024	President	Harris 51% - 47%
2024	Senate (Reg.)	Schiff 52% - 48%

=== 2027-2033 boundaries ===
Year	Office	Results
2008	President	Obama 57% - 42%
2010	Governor	Brown 50% - 45%
2010	Lt. Governor	Maldonado 49% - 40%
2010	Secretary of State	Bowen 49% - 42%
2010	Attorney General	Cooley 49% - 42%
2010	Treasurer	Lockyer 53% - 39%
2010	Controller	Chiang 55% - 37%
2012	President	Obama 59% - 41%
2014	Governor	Brown 55% - 45%
2016	President	Clinton 58% - 36%
2018	Governor	Newsom 57% - 43%
2020	President	Biden 60% - 38%
2022	Senate (Reg.)	Padilla 54% - 46%
2022	Governor	Newsom 52% - 48%
2022	Lt. Governor	Kounalakis 53% - 47%
2022	Secretary of State	Weber 54% - 46%
2022	Attorney General	Bonta 53% - 47%
2022	Treasurer	Ma 53% - 47%
2022	Controller	Chen 51% - 49%
2024	President	Harris 52% - 46%
2024	Senate (Reg.)	Schiff 53% - 47%

== Composition ==
FIPS County Code	County	Seat	Population
19	Fresno	Fresno	1,017,162
107	Tulare	Visalia	479,468

=== Cities and CDPs with 10,000 or more people ===
- Fresno – 542,107
- Visalia – 141,384
- Sanger – 26,617
- Reedley – 25,227
- Selma – 24,674
- Dinuba – 24,563
- Parlier – 18,494
- Kingsburg – 12,380
- Farmersville – 10,382
- Exeter – 10,324

=== 2,500 – 10,000 people ===
- Orange Cove – 9,649
- Orosi – 8,329
- Woodlake – 7,419
- Fowler – 6,700
- Old Fig Garden – 5,477
- Goshen – 4,968
- Mayfair – 4,831
- Sunnyside – 4,627
- Cutler – 4,480
- Ivanhoe – 4,198

== List of members representing the district ==
Representative	Party	Dates	Cong ress(es)	Electoral history	Counties
District created January 3, 1943
Harry R. Sheppard (Yucaipa)	Democratic	January 3, 1943 – January 3, 1953	78th 79th 80th 81st 82nd	Redistricted from the 19th district and re-elected in 1942. Re-elected in 1944. Re-elected in 1946. Re-elected in 1948. Re-elected in 1950. Redistricted to the 27th district.	1943–1953; Northern Los Angeles, San Bernardino
Edgar W. Hiestand (Burbank)	Republican	January 3, 1953 – January 3, 1963	83rd 84th 85th 86th 87th	Elected in 1952. Re-elected in 1954. Re-elected in 1956. Re-elected in 1958. Re-elected in 1960. Redistricted to the 27th district and lost re-election.	1953–1983; Los Angeles
Augustus Hawkins (Los Angeles)	Democratic	January 3, 1963 – January 3, 1975	88th 89th 90th 91st 92nd 93rd	Elected in 1962. Re-elected in 1964. Re-elected in 1966. Re-elected in 1968. Re-elected in 1970. Re-elected in 1972. Redistricted to the 29th district.	1953–1983; Los Angeles
James C. Corman (Los Angeles)	Democratic	January 3, 1975 – January 3, 1981	94th 95th 96th	Redistricted from the 22nd district and re-elected in 1974. Re-elected in 1976. re-elected in 1976; Lost re-election.	1953–1983; Los Angeles
Bobbi Fiedler (Los Angeles)	Republican	January 3, 1981 – January 3, 1987	97th 98th 99th	Elected in 1980. Re-elected in 1982. Re-elected in 1984. Retired to run for U.S. Senator.	1953–1983; Los Angeles
Bobbi Fiedler (Los Angeles)	Republican	January 3, 1981 – January 3, 1987	97th 98th 99th	Elected in 1980. Re-elected in 1982. Re-elected in 1984. Retired to run for U.S. Senator.	1983–1993; Los Angeles (western San Fernando Valley), southeastern Ventura
Elton Gallegly (Simi Valley)	Republican	January 3, 1987 – January 3, 1993	100th 101st 102nd	Elected in 1986. Re-elected in 1988. Re-elected in 1990. Redistricted to the 23rd district.	1983–1993; Los Angeles (western San Fernando Valley), southeastern Ventura
Bill Thomas (Bakersfield)	Republican	January 3, 1993 – January 3, 2003	103rd 104th 105th 106th 107th	Redistricted from the 20th district and re-elected in 1992. Re-elected in 1994. Re-elected in 1996. Re-elected in 1998. Re-elected in 2000. Redistricted to the 22nd district.	1993–2003; Kern, eastern Tulare
Devin Nunes (Tulare)	Republican	January 3, 2003 – January 3, 2013	108th 109th 110th 111th 112th	Elected in 2002. Re-elected in 2004. Re-elected in 2006. Re-elected in 2008. Re-elected in 2010. Redistricted to the 22nd district.	2003–2013 Eastern Fresno, Tulare
David Valadao (Hanford)	Republican	January 3, 2013 – January 3, 2019	113th 114th 115th	Elected in 2012. Re-elected in 2014. Re-elected in 2016. Lost re-election.	2013–2023 Kings, parts of Fresno, Kern and Tulare.
TJ Cox (Selma)	Democratic	January 3, 2019 – January 3, 2021	116th	Elected in 2018. Lost re-election.	2013–2023 Kings, parts of Fresno, Kern and Tulare.
David Valadao (Hanford)	Republican	January 3, 2021– January 3, 2023	117th	Elected in 2020. Redistricted to the 22nd district.	2013–2023 Kings, parts of Fresno, Kern and Tulare.
Jim Costa (Fresno)	Democratic	January 3, 2023 – present	118th 119th	Redistricted from the 16th district and re-elected in 2022. Re-elected in 2024. Re-elected in 2026.	2023–present central San Joaquin Valley between Fresno and Visalia

== Election results ==
=== 1942 ===
1942 United States House of Representatives elections in California, 21st district
Party	Candidate	Votes	%
Democratic	Harry R. Sheppard (Incumbent)	38,419	96.6
Republican	Arthur E. Isham (write-in)	1,350	3.4
Total votes		39,769	100.0
Turnout			
Democratic hold			

=== 1944 ===
1944 United States House of Representatives elections in California, 21st district
Party	Candidate	Votes	%
Democratic	Harry R. Sheppard (Incumbent)	48,539	58.5
Republican	Earl S. Webb	34,409	41.5
Total votes		82,948	100.0
Turnout			
Democratic hold			

=== 1946 ===
1946 United States House of Representatives elections in California, 21st district
Party	Candidate	Votes	%
Democratic	Harry R. Sheppard (Incumbent)	37,229	52.7
Republican	Lowell E. Lathrop	33,395	47.3
Total votes		70,624	100.0
Turnout			
Democratic hold			

=== 1948 ===
1948 United States House of Representatives elections in California, 21st district
Party	Candidate	Votes	%
Democratic	Harry R. Sheppard (Incumbent)	61,383	55.2
Republican	Lowell E. Lathrop	47,411	42.6
Progressive	Howard J. Louks	2,422	2.2
Total votes		111,216	100.0
Turnout			
Democratic hold			

=== 1950 ===
1950 United States House of Representatives elections in California, 21st district
Party	Candidate	Votes	%
Democratic	Harry R. Sheppard (Incumbent)	62,994	57.4
Republican	R. E. Reynolds	46,693	42.6
Total votes		109,687	100.0
Turnout			
Democratic hold			

=== 1952 ===
1952 United States House of Representatives elections in California, 21st district
Party	Candidate	Votes	%
Republican	Edgar W. Hiestand	112,100	53.6
Democratic	Everett G. Burkhalter	97,007	46.4
Total votes		209,107	100.0
Turnout			
Republican win (new seat)			

=== 1954 ===
1954 United States House of Representatives elections in California, 21st district
Party	Candidate	Votes	%
Republican	Edgar W. Hiestand (Incumbent)	100,258	58.7
Democratic	William E. "Bill" Roskam	70,486	41.3
Total votes		170,744	100.0
Turnout			
Republican hold			

=== 1956 ===
1956 United States House of Representatives elections in California, 21st district
Party	Candidate	Votes	%
Republican	Edgar W. Hiestand (Incumbent)	153,679	62.6
Democratic	W. C. "Bill" Stethem	91,683	37.4
Total votes		245,362	100.0
Turnout			
Republican hold			

=== 1958 ===
1958 United States House of Representatives elections in California, 21st district
Party	Candidate	Votes	%
Republican	Edgar W. Hiestand (Incumbent)	127,238	51.9
Democratic	Mrs. Rudd Brown	118,141	48.1
Total votes		245,379	100.0
Turnout			
Republican hold			

=== 1960 ===
1960 United States House of Representatives elections in California, 21st district
Party	Candidate	Votes	%
Republican	Edgar W. Hiestand (Incumbent)	179,376	58.4
Democratic	Mrs. Rudd Brown	127,591	41.6
Total votes		306,967	100.0
Turnout			
Republican hold			

=== 1962 ===
1962 United States House of Representatives elections in California, 21st district
Party	Candidate	Votes	%
Democratic	Augustus F. Hawkins	73,465	84.6
Republican	Herman Smith	13,371	15.2
Total votes		86,836	100.0
Turnout			
Democratic win (new seat)			

=== 1964 ===
1964 United States House of Representatives elections in California, 21st district
Party	Candidate	Votes	%
Democratic	Augustus F. Hawkins (Incumbent)	106,231	90.3
Republican	Rayfield Lundy	11,374	9.7
Total votes		117,605	100.0
Turnout			
Democratic hold			

=== 1966 ===
1966 United States House of Representatives elections in California, 21st district
Party	Candidate	Votes	%
Democratic	Augustus F. Hawkins (Incumbent)	74,216	84.8
Republican	Rayfield Lundy	13,294	15.2
Total votes		87,510	100.0
Turnout			
Democratic hold			

=== 1968 ===
1968 United States House of Representatives elections in California, 21st district
Party	Candidate	Votes	%
Democratic	Augustus F. Hawkins (Incumbent)	87,205	91.6
Republican	Rayfield Lundy	7,995	8.4
Total votes		95,200	100.0
Turnout			
Democratic hold			

=== 1970 ===
1970 United States House of Representatives elections in California, 21st district
Party	Candidate	Votes	%
Democratic	Augustus F. Hawkins (Incumbent)	75,127	94.5
Republican	Southy M. Johnson	4,349	5.5
Total votes		79,476	100.0
Turnout			
Democratic hold			

=== 1972 ===
1972 United States House of Representatives elections in California, 21st district
Party	Candidate	Votes	%
Democratic	Augustus F. Hawkins (Incumbent)	92,799	82.9
Republican	Rayfield Lundy	19,187	17.1
Total votes		111,986	100.0
Turnout			
Democratic hold			

=== 1974 ===
1974 United States House of Representatives elections in California, 21st district
Party	Candidate	Votes	%
Democratic	James C. Corman (Incumbent)	86,778	73.5
Republican	Mel Nadell	31,365	26.5
Total votes		118,143	100.0
Turnout			
Democratic hold			

=== 1976 ===
1976 United States House of Representatives elections in California, 21st district
Party	Candidate	Votes	%
Democratic	James C. Corman (Incumbent)	101,837	66.5
Republican	Erwin Ed Hogan	44,094	28.8
Peace and Freedom	Bill Hill	7,178	4.7
Total votes		153,109	100.0
Turnout			
Democratic hold			

=== 1978 ===
1978 United States House of Representatives elections in California, 21st district
Party	Candidate	Votes	%
Democratic	James C. Corman (Incumbent)	73,869	59.5
Republican	Rod Walsh	44,519	35.9
Peace and Freedom	Bill Hill	5,750	4.6
Total votes		124,138	100.0
Turnout			
Democratic hold			

=== 1980 ===
1980 United States House of Representatives elections in California, 21st district
Party	Candidate	Votes	%
Republican	Bobbi Fiedler	74,674	48.7
Democratic	James C. Corman (Incumbent)	73,898	48.2
Libertarian	George J. Lehmann	2,790	1.8
Peace and Freedom	Jan B. Tucker	2,038	1.3
Total votes		153,400	100.0
Turnout			
Republican gain from Democratic			

=== 1982 ===
1982 United States House of Representatives elections in California, 21st district
Party	Candidate	Votes	%
Republican	Bobbi Fiedler (Incumbent)	138,474	71.8
Democratic	George Henry Margolis	46,412	24.1
Libertarian	Daniel Wiener	7,881	4.1
Total votes		192,767	100.0
Turnout			
Republican hold			

=== 1984 ===
1984 United States House of Representatives elections in California, 21st district
Party	Candidate	Votes	%
Republican	Bobbi Fiedler (Incumbent)	173,504	72.3
Democratic	Charles "Charlie" Davis	62,085	25.9
Libertarian	Robert Townsend Leet	4,379	1.8
Total votes		239,968	100.0
Turnout			
Republican hold			

=== 1986 ===
1986 United States House of Representatives elections in California, 21st district
Party	Candidate	Votes	%
Republican	Elton Gallegly	132,090	68.4
Democratic	Gilbert R. Saldana	54,497	28.2
Libertarian	Daniel Wiener	6,504	3.4
Total votes		193,091	100.0
Turnout			
Republican hold			

=== 1988 ===
1988 United States House of Representatives elections in California, 21st district
Party	Candidate	Votes	%
Republican	Elton Gallegly (Incumbent)	181,413	69.1
Democratic	Donald E. Stevens	75,739	28.8
Libertarian	Robert Jay	5,519	2.1
Total votes		262,671	100.0
Turnout			
Republican hold			

=== 1990 ===
1990 United States House of Representatives elections in California, 21st district
Party	Candidate	Votes	%
Republican	Elton Gallegly (Incumbent)	118,326	58.4
Democratic	Richard D. Freiman	68,921	34.0
Libertarian	Peggy L. Christensen	15,364	7.6
Total votes		202,611	100.0
Turnout			
Republican hold			

=== 1992 ===
1992 United States House of Representatives elections in California, 21st district
Party	Candidate	Votes	%
Republican	Bill Thomas (Incumbent)	127,758	65.2
Democratic	Deborah A. Vollmer	68,058	34.7
Libertarian	Mike Hodges (write-in)	149	0.1
Total votes		195,965	100.0
Turnout			
Republican hold			

=== 1994 ===
1994 United States House of Representatives elections in California, 21st district
Party	Candidate	Votes	%
Republican	Bill Thomas (Incumbent)	116,874	68.10
Democratic	John L. Evans	47,517	27.69
Libertarian	Mike Hodges	6,899	4.02
No party	Vollmer (write-in)	339	0.20
Total votes		171,629	100.0
Turnout			
Republican hold			

=== 1996 ===
1996 United States House of Representatives elections in California, 21st district
Party	Candidate	Votes	%
Republican	Bill Thomas (Incumbent)	125,916	65.9
Democratic	Deborah Vollmer	50,694	26.5
Reform	John Evans	8,113	4.3
Natural Law	Jane Bialosky	3,380	1.8
Libertarian	Mike Hodges	3,049	1.5
Republican	Karen Gentry (write-in)	172	0.0
Total votes		191,324	100.0
Turnout			
Republican hold			

=== 1998 ===
1998 United States House of Representatives elections in California, 21st district
Party	Candidate	Votes	%
Republican	Bill Thomas (Incumbent)	115,989	78.91
Democratic	John Evans	30,994	21.09
Total votes		146,983	100.0
Turnout			
Republican hold			

=== 2000 ===
2000 United States House of Representatives elections in California, 21st district
Party	Candidate	Votes	%
Republican	Bill Thomas (Incumbent)	142,539	71.6
Democratic	Pedro "Pete" Martinez	49,318	24.8
Libertarian	James R.S. Manion	7,243	3.6
Total votes		199,100	100.0
Turnout			
Republican hold			

=== 2002 ===
2002 United States House of Representatives elections in California, 21st district
Party	Candidate	Votes	%
Republican	Devin Nunes	87,544	70.5
Democratic	David G. LaPere	32,584	26.3
Libertarian	Jonathan Richter	4,070	3.2
Total votes		124,198	100.0
Turnout			
Republican win (new seat)			

=== 2004 ===
2004 United States House of Representatives elections in California, 21st district
Party	Candidate	Votes	%
Republican	Devin Nunes (Incumbent)	140,721	73.2
Democratic	Fred B. Davis	51,594	26.8
Total votes		192,315	100.0
Turnout			
Republican hold			

=== 2006 ===
2006 United States House of Representatives elections in California, 21st district
Party	Candidate	Votes	%
Republican	Devin Nunes (Incumbent)	95,214	66.8
Democratic	Steven Haze	42,718	29.9
Green	John Roger Miller	4,729	3.3
Total votes		142,661	100.0
Turnout			
Republican hold			

=== 2008 ===
2008 United States House of Representatives elections in California, 21st district
Party	Candidate	Votes	%
Republican	Devin Nunes (Incumbent)	143,498	68.4
Democratic	Larry Johnson	66,317	31.6
Total votes		209,815	100.0
Turnout			
Republican hold			

=== 2010 ===
2010 United States House of Representatives elections in California, 21st district
Party	Candidate	Votes	%
Republican	Devin Nunes (Incumbent)	135,979	100.0
Total votes		135,979	100.0
Turnout			
Republican hold			

=== 2012 ===
2012 United States House of Representatives elections in California, 21st district
Party	Candidate	Votes	%
Republican	David Valadao	67,164	57.8
Democratic	John Hernandez	49,119	42.2
Total votes		116,283	100.0
Republican win (new seat)			

=== 2014 ===
2014 United States House of Representatives elections in California, 21st district
Party	Candidate	Votes	%
Republican	David Valadao (Incumbent)	45,907	57.8
Democratic	Amanda Renteria	33,470	42.2
Total votes		79,377	100.0
Republican hold			

=== 2016 ===
2016 United States House of Representatives elections in California, 21st district
Party	Candidate	Votes	%
Republican	David Valadao (Incumbent)	75,126	56.7
Democratic	Emilio Huerta	57,282	43.3
Total votes		132,408	100.0
Republican hold			

=== 2018 ===
2018 United States House of Representatives elections in California, 21st district
Party	Candidate	Votes	%
Democratic	TJ Cox	57,239	50.4
Republican	David Valadao (Incumbent)	56,377	49.6
Total votes		113,616	100.0
Democratic gain from Republican			

=== 2020 ===
2020 United States House of Representatives elections in California, 21st district
Party	Candidate	Votes	%
Republican	David Valadao	85,928	50.45
Democratic	TJ Cox (Incumbent)	84,406	49.55
Total votes		170,334	100.0
Republican gain from Democratic			

=== 2022 ===
2022 United States House of Representatives elections in California, 21st district
Party	Candidate	Votes	%
Democratic	Jim Costa (Incumbent)	68,074	54.2
Republican	Michael Maher	57,573	45.8
Total votes		125,647	100.0
Democratic hold			

=== 2024 ===
2024 United States House of Representatives elections in California, 21st district
Party	Candidate	Votes	%
Democratic	Jim Costa (Incumbent)	102,798	52.6
Republican	Michael Maher	92,733	47.4
Total votes		195,531	100.0
Democratic hold			

== See also ==
- List of United States congressional districts
- California's congressional districts
