= TJ Cox =

American politician (born 1963)

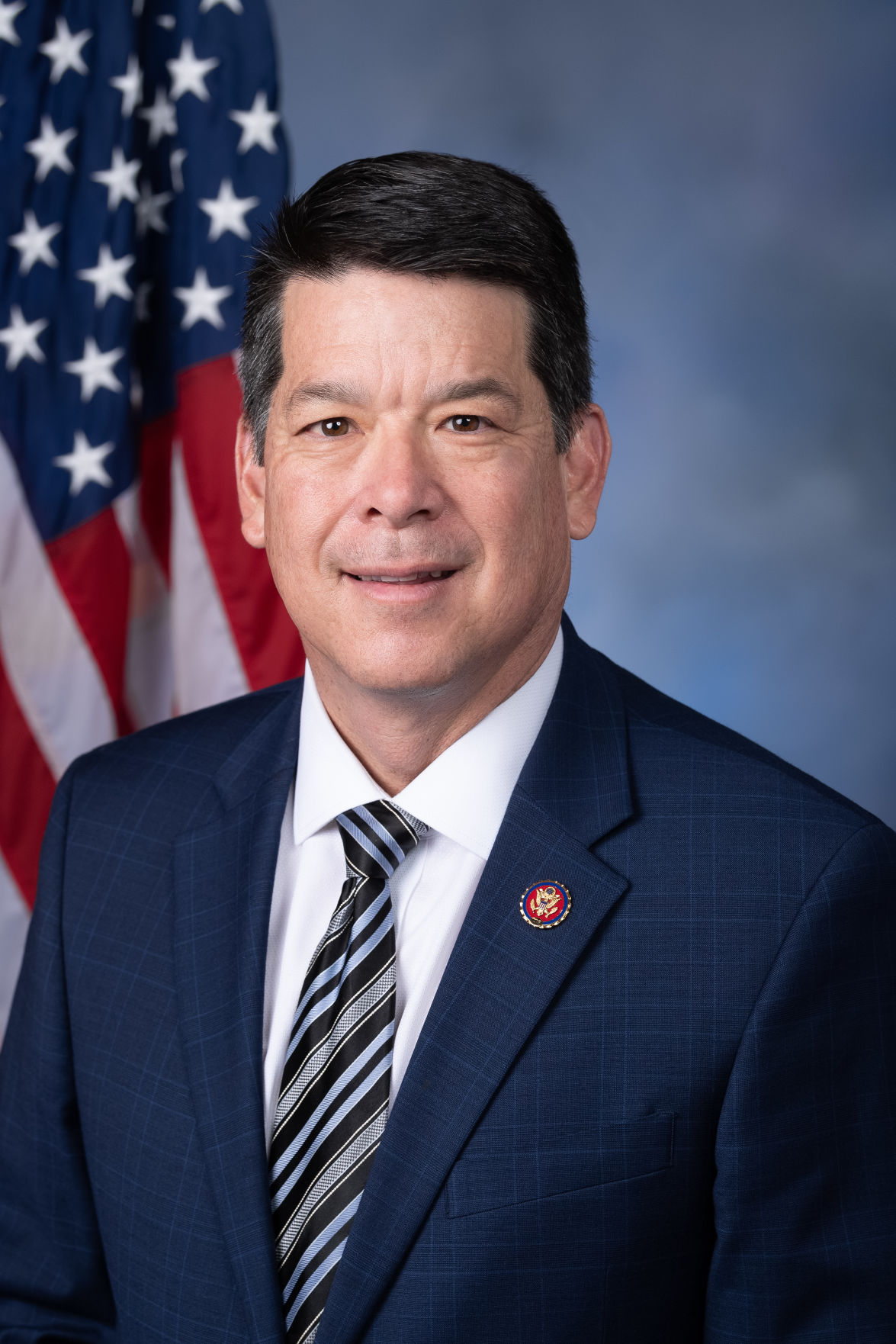
- Official portrait, 2019

Member of the U.S. House of Representatives from California's 21st district
- In office January 3, 2019 – January 3, 2021
- Preceded by: David Valadao
- Succeeded by: David Valadao

Personal details
- Born: Terrance John Cox; July 18, 1963 (age 63) Walnut Creek, California, U.S.
- Party: Democratic
- Spouse: Kathleen Murphy
- Children: 4
- Education: University of Nevada, Reno (BS); Southern Methodist University (MBA)

Terrance John Cox (born July 18, 1963) is an American businessman and former politician who served as the U.S. representative for California's 21st congressional district from 2019 to 2021. The son of Chinese American and Filipino American parents, Cox was elected to the House of Representatives in 2018. A member of the Democratic Party, he was defeated in his 2020 rematch with Republican David Valadao.

In August 2022, Cox was arrested by the Federal Bureau of Investigation on 15 counts of wire fraud, 11 counts of money laundering, one count of financial institution fraud, and one count of campaign contribution fraud. Cox pled guilty to two counts of fraud and agreed to pay $3.5 million in restitution. In May 2026 he began serving a prison sentence of one year and one day.

== Early life and career ==
Cox was born in Walnut Creek, California to Kenneth Edward Cox and Perla DeCastro (now Davis). His father is a chemical engineering professor from China. His mother was born in Manila, Philippines and attended the University of Santo Tomas before immigrating to the U.S. He graduated with a Bachelor of Science in chemical engineering from the University of Nevada, Reno in 1986 and a Master of Business Administration from Southern Methodist University. He started two businesses that process nuts and also managed a community development enterprise.

== U.S. House of Representatives ==
=== Elections ===
==== 2006 ====
Cox ran for the United States House of Representatives in California's 19th congressional district in the 2006 election, losing to incumbent George Radanovich.

==== 2018 ====
In the 2018 elections, Cox again ran for the United States House of Representatives, this time in California's 21st congressional district. Cox began this congressional bid in 2017, competing in California's 10th district primary race against several other Democratic candidates.

However, Emilio Huerta, the only Democratic challenger in the 21st district, withdrew from the race prior to the filing deadline to appear on the primary election ballot. Cox withdrew from the 10th district race to instead run in the 21st district against incumbent Representative David Valadao. He and Valadao advanced from the June 5 top-two primary election to the November 6 general election.

On election night, and for several days after the election, Valadao had more votes, but Cox's vote count pulled into the lead on November 26. By November 28, major news sources called the race for Cox, with Valadao conceding the race the following week. Cox's victory was considered an upset, as most election forecasters rated Valadao as the favorite. Cox won by a narrow 862 vote margin.

==== 2020 ====
Cox ran for reelection in 2020 against Valadao, whom he had beaten in 2018.

Cox was criticized for pushing to gain preferential access into Yosemite National Park over the July 4 weekend. In October 2020, Cox's campaign acknowledged fabricating a tweet to make it appear as if Valadao had retweeted a message from President Trump saying "California is going to hell. Vote Trump!"

Valadao defeated Cox in the election. The Associated Press called the election for Valadao on November 27, 2020, more than three weeks after the election, and Cox conceded defeat on December 4, 2020. Cox underperformed Biden's near 11 point win margin by about 5 points, leaving Valadao with the most Democratic district of any congressional Republican according to Cook Political Report's Partisan Voter Index.

==== 2022 ====
Shortly after his loss in the 2020 election, Cox announced his intention to run for the seat again in 2022. However, on November 17, 2021, Cox endorsed Rudy Salas removing himself from the contest.

=== Committee assignments ===
- Committee on Agriculture
  - Subcommittee on Livestock and Foreign Agriculture
  - Subcommittee on Biotechnology, Horticulture, and Research
- Committee on Natural Resources
  - Subcommittee on Oversight and Investigations (chair)
  - Subcommittee on Water, Oceans and Wildlife

=== Arrest and prison sentence ===
When Cox made an updated financial disclosure in 2019, it was discovered that he had failed to disclose business interests as a candidate in 2018. It was also discovered that Cox failed to timely pay wages owed to three employees of Constellation Mines, a company where Cox was a director until early 2019.

In January 2020, the IRS placed a tax lien on Cox for approximately $87,000 in unpaid income tax for 2016 and approximately $57,000 in unpaid income tax for 2017. Cox was also subject to a $50,000 IRS tax lien in 2017. In March 2020, Cox voted against a bill that would require members of Congress to disclose tax liens.

In August 2021, state filings revealed that 35% of the spending from Cox's "VoterPAC", created with funds remaining from his campaign, went to MJTJ, LLC, an organization wholly owned by Cox that was originally created for real estate investments. VoterPAC was created to engage in voter registration. MJTJ, LLC, was reportedly illegally created for fundraising purposes.

In August 2022, Cox was arrested by the Federal Bureau of Investigation on 15 counts of wire fraud, 11 counts of money laundering, one count of financial institution fraud, and one count of campaign contribution fraud. On December 10, 2024, Cox agreed to plead guilty to two counts of fraud and agreed to pay $3.5 million in restitution and face a possible prison sentence. On December 15, 2025, Cox was sentenced to one year and one day in prison, but the judge delayed the start of his sentence to May 27, 2026, in order to allow him to attend his child's graduation.

== Electoral history ==
California's 21st congressional district election, 2018
Primary election
Party	Candidate	Votes	%
Republican	David Valadao (incumbent)	34,290	62.8
Democratic	TJ Cox	20,293	37.2
Total votes		54,583	100.0
General election
Democratic	TJ Cox	57,239	50.4
Republican	David Valadao (incumbent)	56,377	49.6
Total votes		113,616	100.0
Democratic gain from Republican			

California's 21st congressional district election, 2020
Primary election
Party	Candidate	Votes	%
Republican	David Valadao	39,488	49.7
Democratic	TJ Cox (incumbent)	30,697	38.7
Democratic	Ricardo De La Fuente	7,309	9.2
Republican	Rocky De La Fuente	1,912	2.4
Total votes		79,406	100.0
General election
Republican	David Valadao	85,928	50.5
Democratic	TJ Cox (incumbent)	84,406	49.5
Total votes		170,334	100.0
Republican gain from Democratic			

== Personal life ==
Cox has four children with his wife, pediatrician Kathleen Murphy.

== See also ==
- List of Asian Americans and Pacific Islands Americans in the United States Congress

U.S. House of Representatives
Preceded by David Valadao	Member of the U.S. House of Representatives from California's 21st congressional district 2019–2021	Succeeded by David Valadao
U.S. order of precedence (ceremonial)
Preceded by Gloria Negrete McLeod as Former U.S. Representative	Order of precedence of the United States as Former U.S. Representative	Succeeded by Harley Rouda as Former U.S. Representative
