= 2018 United States House of Representatives elections in California =

- November 6, 2018

All 53 California seats to the United States House of Representatives
- Turnout: 61.86%
	Majority party	Minority party
Party	Democratic	Republican
Last election	39	14
Seats won	46	7
Seat change	▲7	▼7
Popular vote	8,010,445	3,973,396
Percentage	65.74%	32.61%
Swing	▲3.43%	▼4.28%

Democratic hold Democratic gain
Republican hold
Democratic
50–60%
60–70%
70–80%
80–90%
90–100%
Republican
50–60%
60–70%
70–80%
90–100%

The 2018 United States House of Representatives elections in California were held on November 6, 2018, with the primary elections being held on June 5, 2018. Voters elected the 53 U.S. representatives from the state of California, one from each of the state's 53 congressional districts. The elections coincided with the elections of other offices, including a gubernatorial election, other elections to the House of Representatives, elections to the United States Senate, and various state and local elections.

Republican incumbents Jeff Denham, David Valadao, Steve Knight, Mimi Walters, and Dana Rohrabacher (who had been elected to fifteen terms) were all defeated. Democrats also picked up two open seats previously held by retiring GOP incumbents: thirteen-term incumbent Ed Royce and nine-term incumbent Darrell Issa. The seven Democratic House pickups in California were the most made by the party in the 2018 election cycle.

Additionally, Democrats won all House seats in Orange County, traditionally a Republican bastion.

== Overview ==
=== Statewide ===
United States House of Representatives elections in California, 2018 Primary election — June 5, 2018
Party	Votes	Percentage	Candidates	Advancing to general	Seats contesting
Democratic	4,189,103	63.55%	117 (Note: 112 campaigning Democratic candidates. Suspended campaign: Dotty Nygard (District 10); Aja Brown (District 44); Michael Kotick, Laura Oatman, and Rachel Payne (District 48). Although she suspended her campaign, Brown did advance to the general election.)	55	52
Republican	2,250,074	34.13%	95 (Note: 93 campaigning Republican candidates. Suspended campaign: Stacey Dash (District 44) and Stelian Onufrei (District 48).)	46	45
No party preference	95,908	1.45%	24 (Note: No ballot access: American Solidarity Party, K9 Party, and Socialist Equality Party. Brian T. Carroll (ASP, District 22), Robert Pendleton (K9, District 49), and Kevin Mitchell (SEP, District 51), appear on ballot as "No party preference.")	2	2
Green	38,737	0.59%	10	3	3
Libertarian	11,493	0.17%	6	0	0
American Independent	6,747	0.10%	5	0	0
Peace and Freedom	233	<0.01%	1	0	0
Totals	6,592,295	100%	258	106	—

United States House of Representatives elections in California, 2018 General election — November 6, 2018
Party	Votes	Percentage	Seats before	Seats after	+/–
Democratic	8,010,445	65.74%	39	46	▲7
Republican	3,973,396	32.61%	14	7	▼7
Green	103,459	0.85%	0	0	Steady
No party preference	97,202	0.80%	0	0	Steady
Valid votes	12,184,522	95.85%	—	—	—
Invalid votes	528,020	4.15%	—	—	—
Totals	12,712,542	100.00%	53	53	—
Voter turnout	64.54% (registered voters) 50.45% (eligible voters)				

Popular vote
Democratic	65.74%
Republican	32.61%
Green	0.85%
No party preference	0.80%

House seats
Democratic	86.79%
Republican	13.21%

=== By district ===
Results of the 2018 United States House of Representatives elections in California by district:

District	Democratic		Republican		Others		Total		Result
District	Votes	%	Votes	%	Votes	%	Votes	%	Result
District 1	131,548	45.11%	160,046	54.89%	0	0.00%	291,594	100.0%	Republican hold
District 2	243,081	77.01%	72,576	22.99%	0	0.00%	315,657	100.0%	Democratic hold
District 3	134,875	58.07%	97,376	41.93%	0	0.00%	232,251	100.0%	Democratic hold
District 4	156,253	45.87%	184,401	54.13%	0	0.00%	340,654	100.0%	Republican hold
District 5	205,860	78.87%	0	0.00%	55,158	21.13%	261,018	100.0%	Democratic hold
District 6	201,939	100.00%	0	0.00%	0	0.00%	201,939	100.0%	Democratic hold
District 7	155,016	55.04%	126,601	44.96%	0	0.00%	281,617	100.0%	Democratic hold
District 8	0	0.00%	170,785	100.00%	0	0.00%	170,785	100.0%	Republican hold
District 9	113,414	56.49%	87,349	43.51%	0	0.00%	200,763	100.0%	Democratic hold
District 10	115,945	52.25%	105,955	47.75%	0	0.00%	221,900	100.0%	Democratic gain
District 11	204,369	74.13%	71,312	25.87%	0	0.00%	275,681	100.0%	Democratic hold
District 12	275,292	86.82%	41,780	13.18%	0	0.00%	317,072	100.0%	Democratic hold
District 13	260,580	88.38%	0	0.00%	34,257	11.62%	294,837	100.0%	Democratic hold
District 14	211,384	79.22%	55,439	20.78%	0	0.00%	266,823	100.0%	Democratic hold
District 15	177,989	72.97%	65,940	27.03%	0	0.00%	243,929	100.0%	Democratic hold
District 16	82,266	57.55%	60,693	42.45%	0	0.00%	142,959	100.0%	Democratic hold
District 17	159,105	75.35%	52,057	24.65%	0	0.00%	211,162	100.0%	Democratic hold
District 18	225,142	74.49%	77,096	25.51%	0	0.00%	302,238	100.0%	Democratic hold
District 19	162,496	73.75%	57,823	26.25%	0	0.00%	220,319	100.0%	Democratic hold
District 20	183,677	81.37%	0	0.00%	42,044	18.63%	225,721	100.0%	Democratic hold
District 21	57,239	50.38%	56,377	49.62%	0	0.00%	113,616	100.0%	Democratic gain
District 22	105,136	47.28%	117,243	52.72%	0	0.00%	222,379	100.0%	Republican hold
District 23	74,661	36.28%	131,113	63.72%	0	0.00%	205,774	100.0%	Republican hold
District 24	166,550	58.56%	117,881	41.44%	0	0.00%	284,431	100.0%	Democratic hold
District 25	133,209	54.37%	111,813	45.63%	0	0.00%	245,022	100.0%	Democratic gain
District 26	158,216	61.94%	97,210	38.06%	0	0.00%	255,426	100.0%	Democratic hold
District 27	202,636	100.00%	0	0.00%	0	0.00%	202,636	100.0%	Democratic hold
District 28	196,662	78.37%	54,272	21.63%	0	0.00%	250,934	100.0%	Democratic hold
District 29	124,697	80.61%	29,995	19.39%	0	0.00%	154,692	100.0%	Democratic hold
District 30	191,573	73.40%	69,420	26.60%	0	0.00%	260,993	100.0%	Democratic hold
District 31	110,143	58.74%	77,352	41.26%	0	0.00%	187,495	100.0%	Democratic hold
District 32	121,759	68.78%	55,272	31.22%	0	0.00%	177,031	100.0%	Democratic hold
District 33	219,091	70.03%	93,769	29.97%	0	0.00%	312,860	100.0%	Democratic hold
District 34	110,195	72.54%	0	0.00%	41,711	27.46%	151,906	100.0%	Democratic hold
District 35	103,420	69.40%	45,604	30.60%	0	0.00%	149,024	100.0%	Democratic hold
District 36	122,169	59.02%	84,839	40.98%	0	0.00%	207,008	100.0%	Democratic hold
District 37	210,555	89.08%	25,823	10.92%	0	0.00%	236,378	100.0%	Democratic hold
District 38	139,188	68.85%	62,968	31.15%	0	0.00%	202,156	100.0%	Democratic hold
District 39	126,002	51.56%	118,391	48.44%	0	0.00%	244,393	100.0%	Democratic gain
District 40	93,938	77.35%	0	0.00%	27,511	22.65%	121,449	100.0%	Democratic hold
District 41	108,227	65.10%	58,021	34.90%	0	0.00%	166,248	100.0%	Democratic hold
District 42	100,892	43.50%	131,040	56.50%	0	0.00%	231,932	100.0%	Republican hold
District 43	152,272	77.67%	43,780	22.33%	0	0.00%	196,052	100.0%	Democratic hold
District 44	143,322	100.00%	0	0.00%	0	0.00%	143,322	100.0%	Democratic hold
District 45	158,906	52.05%	146,383	47.95%	0	0.00%	305,289	100.0%	Democratic gain
District 46	102,278	69.15%	45,638	30.85%	0	0.00%	147,916	100.0%	Democratic hold
District 47	143,354	64.86%	77,682	35.14%	0	0.00%	221,036	100.0%	Democratic hold
District 48	157,837	53.55%	136,899	46.45%	0	0.00%	294,736	100.0%	Democratic gain
District 49	166,453	56.42%	128,577	43.58%	0	0.00%	295,030	100.0%	Democratic gain
District 50	125,448	48.28%	134,362	51.72%	0	0.00%	259,810	100.0%	Republican hold
District 51	109,527	71.20%	44,301	28.80%	0	0.00%	153,828	100.0%	Democratic hold
District 52	188,992	63.85%	107,015	36.15%	0	0.00%	296,007	100.0%	Democratic hold
District 53	185,667	69.07%	83,127	30.93%	0	0.00%	268,794	100.0%	Democratic hold
Total	8,010,445	65.74%	3,973,396	32.61%	200,681	1.65%	12,184,522	100.0%	

== District 1 ==
2018 California's 1st congressional district election
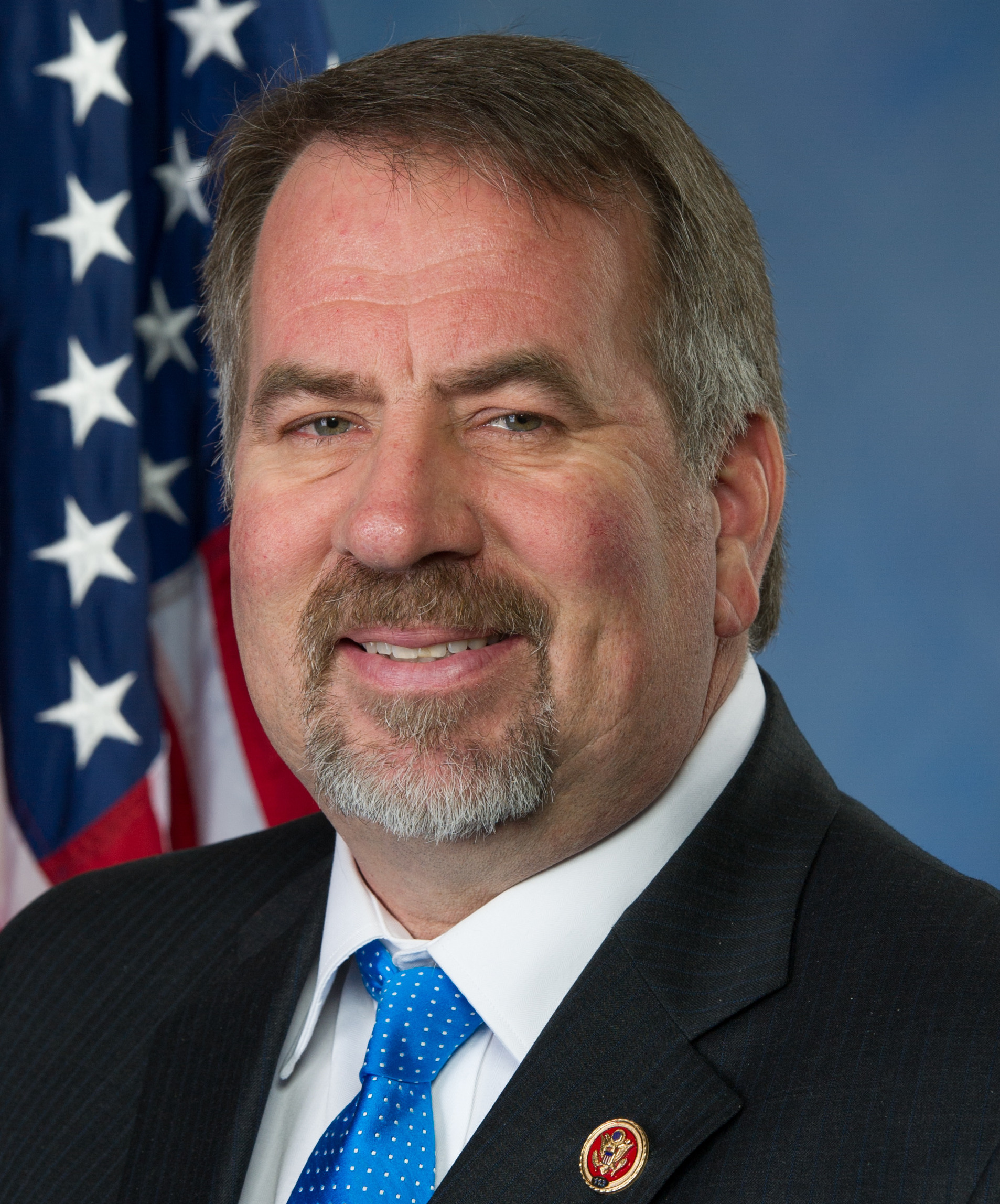

Candidate	Doug LaMalfa	Audrey Denney
Party	Republican	Democratic
Popular vote	160,046	131,548
Percentage	54.9%	45.1%
- County results LaMalfa: 50–60% 60–70%
U.S. Representative before election
Doug LaMalfa
Republican
Elected U.S. Representative
Doug LaMalfa
Republican

The 1st district is based in inland Northern California and includes Chico and Redding. Incumbent Republican Doug LaMalfa, who had represented the 1st district since 2013, ran for re-election. He was re-elected with 59.1% of the vote in 2016. The district had a PVI of R+11.

=== Primary election ===
==== Republican candidates ====
===== Advanced to general =====
- Doug LaMalfa, incumbent U.S. representative

===== Eliminated in primary =====
- Gregory Cheadle, real estate broker and candidate for this seat in 2012, 2014 & 2016

==== Democratic candidates ====
===== Advanced to general =====
- Audrey Denney, educator and farmer

===== Eliminated in primary =====
- Jessica Holcombe, business attorney
- David Peterson, small business owner
- Marty Walters, environmental scientist

===== Withdrawn =====
- Dennis Duncan
- Larry Jordan
- Brandon Storment

==== Green candidates ====
===== Eliminated in primary =====
- Lewis Elbinger, retired diplomatic officer

==== Results ====
Nonpartisan blanket primary results
Party	Candidate	Votes	%
Republican	Doug LaMalfa (incumbent)	98,354	51.7
Democratic	Audrey Denney	34,121	17.9
Democratic	Jessica Holcombe	22,306	11.7
Democratic	Marty Waters	16,032	8.4
Republican	Gregory Cheadle	11,660	6.1
Democratic	David Peterson	5,707	3.0
Green	Lewis Elbinger	2,191	1.2
Total votes		190,371	100.0

=== General election ===
==== Campaign ====
After advancing to the general election, Democratic candidate Audrey Denney was forced to pause her campaign for emergency tumor-removal surgery in August, but returned in time to debate LaMalfa in September.

==== Predictions ====
Source	Ranking	As of
The Cook Political Report	Likely R	November 5, 2018
Inside Elections	Safe R	November 5, 2018
Sabato's Crystal Ball	Safe R	November 5, 2018
RealClearPolitics	Safe R	November 5, 2018
Daily Kos	Safe R	November 5, 2018
538	Likely R	November 7, 2018
CNN	Safe R	October 31, 2018
Politico	Safe R	November 4, 2018

==== Results ====
Denney lost, having received 45.1% of the vote, but would win the Democratic party nomination for the 2020 election.

California's 1st congressional district election, 2018
Party	Candidate	Votes	%
Republican	Doug LaMalfa (incumbent)	160,046	54.9
Democratic	Audrey Denney	131,548	45.1
Majority		28,498	9.8
Total votes		291,594	100.0
Republican hold			

== District 2 ==
2018 California's 2nd congressional district election
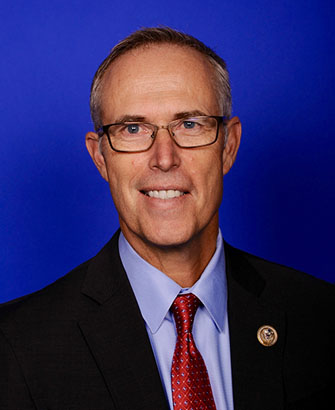

Nominee	Jared Huffman	Dale K. Mensing
Party	Democratic	Republican
Popular vote	243,081	72,576
Percentage	77.0%	23.0%
- County results Huffman: 70–80% 80–90% Mensing: 50–60%
U.S. Representative before election
Jared Huffman
Democratic
Elected U.S. Representative
Jared Huffman
Democratic

The 2nd district is based in California's North Coast and includes Marin County and Eureka. Democrat Jared Huffman, who had represented the 2nd district since 2013, ran for re-election. He was re-elected with 76.9% of the vote in 2016. The district had a PVI of D+22.

=== Primary election ===
==== Democratic candidates ====
===== Advanced to general =====
- Jared Huffman, incumbent U.S. representative

===== Eliminated in primary =====
- Andy Caffrey, sustainability conversion planner

==== Republican candidates ====
===== Advanced to general =====
- Dale K. Mensing, cashier and general election candidate for this seat in 2016

==== Results ====
Nonpartisan blanket primary results
Party	Candidate	Votes	%
Democratic	Jared Huffman (incumbent)	144,005	72.5
Republican	Dale K. Mensing	41,607	20.9
Democratic	Andy Caffrey	13,072	6.6
Total votes		198,684	100.0

=== General election ===
==== Predictions ====
Source	Ranking	As of
The Cook Political Report	Safe D	November 5, 2018
Inside Elections	Safe D	November 5, 2018
Sabato's Crystal Ball	Safe D	November 5, 2018
RealClearPolitics	Safe D	November 5, 2018
Daily Kos	Safe D	November 5, 2018
538	Safe D	November 7, 2018
CNN	Safe D	October 31, 2018
Politico	Safe D	November 4, 2018

==== Endorsements ====
Jared Huffman (D)

Organizations

- J Street PAC

==== Results ====
California's 2nd congressional district election, 2018
Party	Candidate	Votes	%
Democratic	Jared Huffman (incumbent)	243,081	77.0
Republican	Dale K. Mensing	72,576	23.0
Total votes		315,657	100.0
Democratic hold			

== District 3 ==
2018 California's 3rd congressional district election
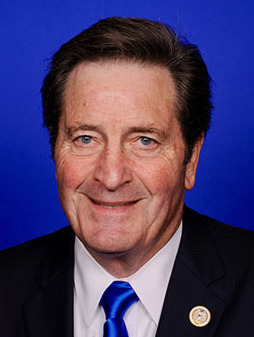

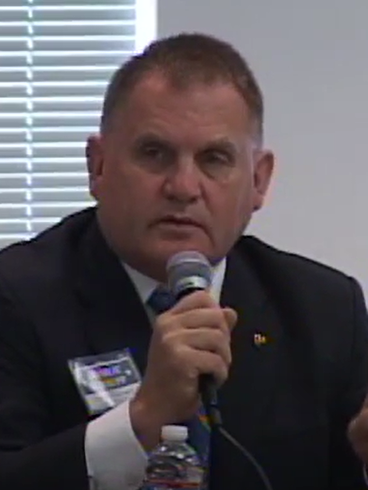
Nominee	John Garamendi	Charlie Schaupp
Party	Democratic	Republican
Popular vote	134,875	97,376
Percentage	58.1%	41.9%
- County results Garamendi: 50–60% 70–80% Schaupp: 50–60% 60–70%
U.S. Representative before election
John Garamendi
Democratic
Elected U.S. Representative
John Garamendi
Democratic

The 3rd district is based in north central California and includes Davis, Fairfield, and Yuba City. Democrat John Garamendi, who had represented the 3rd district since 2013 and had previously represented the 10th district from 2009 to 2013, ran for re-election. He was re-elected with 59.4% of the vote in 2016. The district had a PVI of D+5.

=== Primary election ===
==== Democratic candidates ====
===== Advanced to general =====
- John Garamendi, incumbent U.S. representative

===== Eliminated in primary =====
- Kevin Puett, retired associate director

==== Republican candidates ====
===== Advanced to general =====
- Charlie Schaupp, retired Marine officer

==== Results ====
Nonpartisan blanket primary results
Party	Candidate	Votes	%
Democratic	John Garamendi (incumbent)	74,552	53.6
Republican	Charlie Schaupp	58,598	42.1
Democratic	Kevin Puett	5,971	4.3
Total votes		139,121	100.0

=== General election ===
==== Predictions ====
Source	Ranking	As of
The Cook Political Report	Safe D	November 5, 2018
Inside Elections	Safe D	November 5, 2018
Sabato's Crystal Ball	Safe D	November 5, 2018
RealClearPolitics	Safe D	November 5, 2018
Daily Kos	Safe D	November 5, 2018
538	Safe D	November 7, 2018
CNN	Safe D	October 31, 2018
Politico	Safe D	November 4, 2018

==== Endorsements ====
John Garamendi (D)

Organizations

- J Street PAC

==== Results ====
California's 3rd congressional district election, 2018
Party	Candidate	Votes	%
Democratic	John Garamendi (incumbent)	134,875	58.1
Republican	Charlie Schaupp	97,376	41.9
Total votes		232,251	100.0
Democratic hold			

== District 4 ==
2018 California's 4th congressional district election
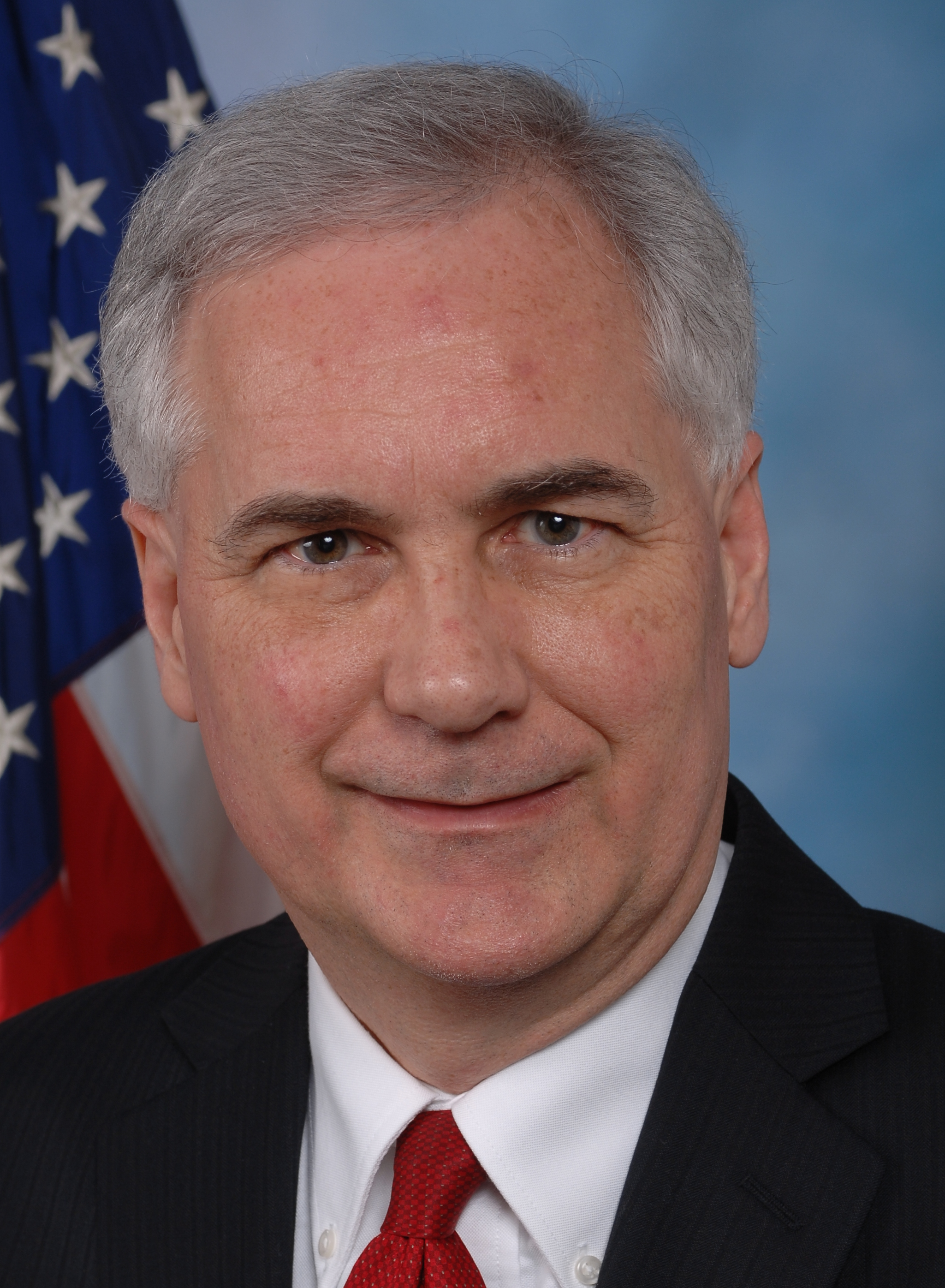

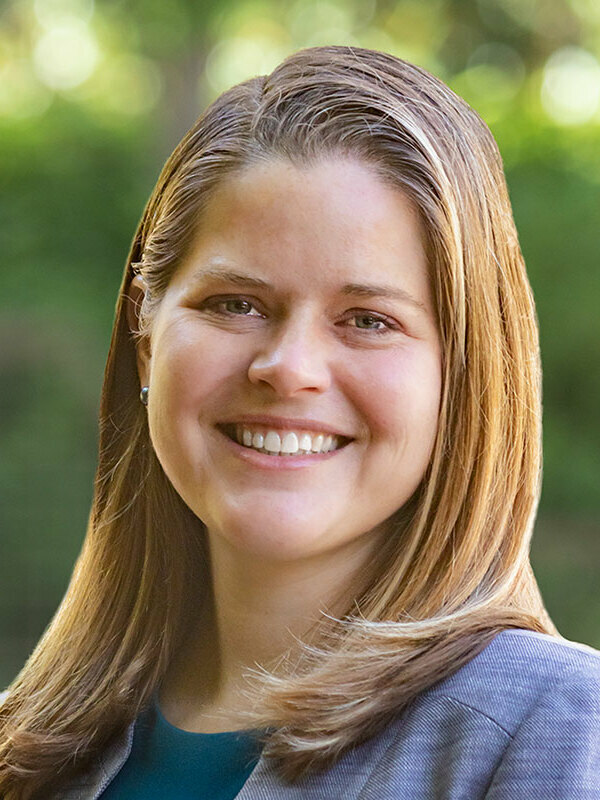
Nominee	Tom McClintock	Jessica Morse
Party	Republican	Democratic
Popular vote	184,401	156,253
Percentage	54.1%	45.9%
- County results McClintock: 50–60% 60–70% 70–80% Morse: 60–70% 70–80%
U.S. Representative before election
Tom McClintock
Republican
Elected U.S. Representative
Tom McClintock
Republican

The 4th district is based in east central California and includes Lake Tahoe, Roseville, and Yosemite National Park. Incumbent Republican Tom McClintock, who had represented the 4th district since 2009, ran for re-election. He was re-elected with 62.7% of the vote in 2016. The district had a PVI of R+10.

=== Primary election ===
==== Republican candidates ====
===== Advanced to general =====
- Tom McClintock, incumbent U.S. representative

===== Eliminated in primary =====
- Mitchell White, accountant and auditor

==== Democratic candidates ====
The 4th district was added as a Republican-held seat that the Democratic Congressional Campaign Committee was targeting on November 9, 2017.

===== Advanced to general =====
- Jessica Morse, national security strategist

===== Eliminated in primary =====
- Regina Bateson, military security analyst
- Roza Calderon, geoscientist, geographer and cartographer
- Robert Lawton, businessman

===== Withdrawn =====
- Steven Castellano
- Chris Drew, product specialist
- Richard Martin
- Rochelle Wilcox, media law and appeals attorney (endorsed Morse)

===== Declined =====
- Charlie Brown, retired Air Force lieutenant colonel and nominee for this seat in 2006 and 2008 (endorsed Morse)

==== Campaign ====
In February, the California Democratic Party endorsed Jessica Morse. Calderon was able to successfully collect 322 CDP-credentialed delegate signatures needed to block the endorsement, in which Morse only received 44 delegate votes. However, CDP staff refused to accept the forms after it was alleged they closed doors early to prevent the submission. A petition was later filed with the Compliance Review Commission by Calderon. The CRC voted to accept and count the signatures, ultimately disqualifying enough signatures to proceed with Morse's endorsement.

California allows candidates to include their professional description under their names on the ballot, however Regina Bateson later challenged Morse's ballot designation title of "National Security Fellow" at the Sacramento Superior Court after months of controversy that Morse, who had not worked in three years, was "fluffing" her credentials. California's secretary of state, Alex Padilla, had struck down Morse's three ballot designations before Judge Gevercer ruled that she presented "no credible evidence" to use the ballot designation of "National Security Fellow". Instead, he held that this title would mislead the average person about her recent activities. In the official Certified Candidate List, Morse's ballot designation was left blank.

==== Endorsements ====
Roza Calderon (D)

Organizations

- Brand New Congress
- Justice Democrats

Local officials

- Gayle McLaughlin (Independent), former mayor of Richmond
Jessica Morse (D)

Individuals

- Charlie Brown, retired Air Force lieutenant colonel and nominee for this seat in 2006 and 2008
- Bob Derlet, physician and nominee for this seat in 2016
- Rochelle Wilcox, media law and appeals attorney

==== Results ====
Nonpartisan blanket primary results
Party	Candidate	Votes	%
Republican	Tom McClintock (incumbent)	109,679	51.8
Democratic	Jessica Morse	42,942	20.3
Democratic	Regina Bateson	26,303	12.4
Republican	Mitchell White	14,433	6.8
Democratic	Roza Calderon	13,621	6.4
Democratic	Robert Lawton	4,593	2.2
Total votes		211,571	100.0

=== General election ===
==== Endorsements ====
Jessica Morse (D)

State officials

- Gavin Newsom, lieutenant governor of California and nominee for governor in 2018

Labor unions

- Amalgamated Transit Union

Organizations

- Democratic Congressional Campaign Committee "Red to Blue" Program
- EMILY's List

==== Polling ====
Poll source	Date(s) administered	Sample size	Margin of error	Tom McClintock (R)	Jessica Morse (D)	Undecided
Clarity Campaign Labs (D-Morse)	October 15–16, 2018	840	± 3.4%	49%	45%	6%

==== Predictions ====
Source	Ranking	As of
The Cook Political Report	Likely R	November 5, 2018
Inside Elections	Likely R	November 5, 2018
Sabato's Crystal Ball	Likely R	November 5, 2018
RCP	Likely R	November 5, 2018
Daily Kos	Likely R	November 5, 2018
538	Likely R	November 7, 2018
CNN	Likely R	October 31, 2018
Politico	Likely R	November 4, 2018

==== Results ====
California's 4th congressional district election, 2018
Party	Candidate	Votes	%
Republican	Tom McClintock (incumbent)	184,401	54.1
Democratic	Jessica Morse	156,253	45.9
Majority		28,148	8.2
Total votes		340,654	100.0
Republican hold			

== District 5 ==
2018 California's 5th congressional district election
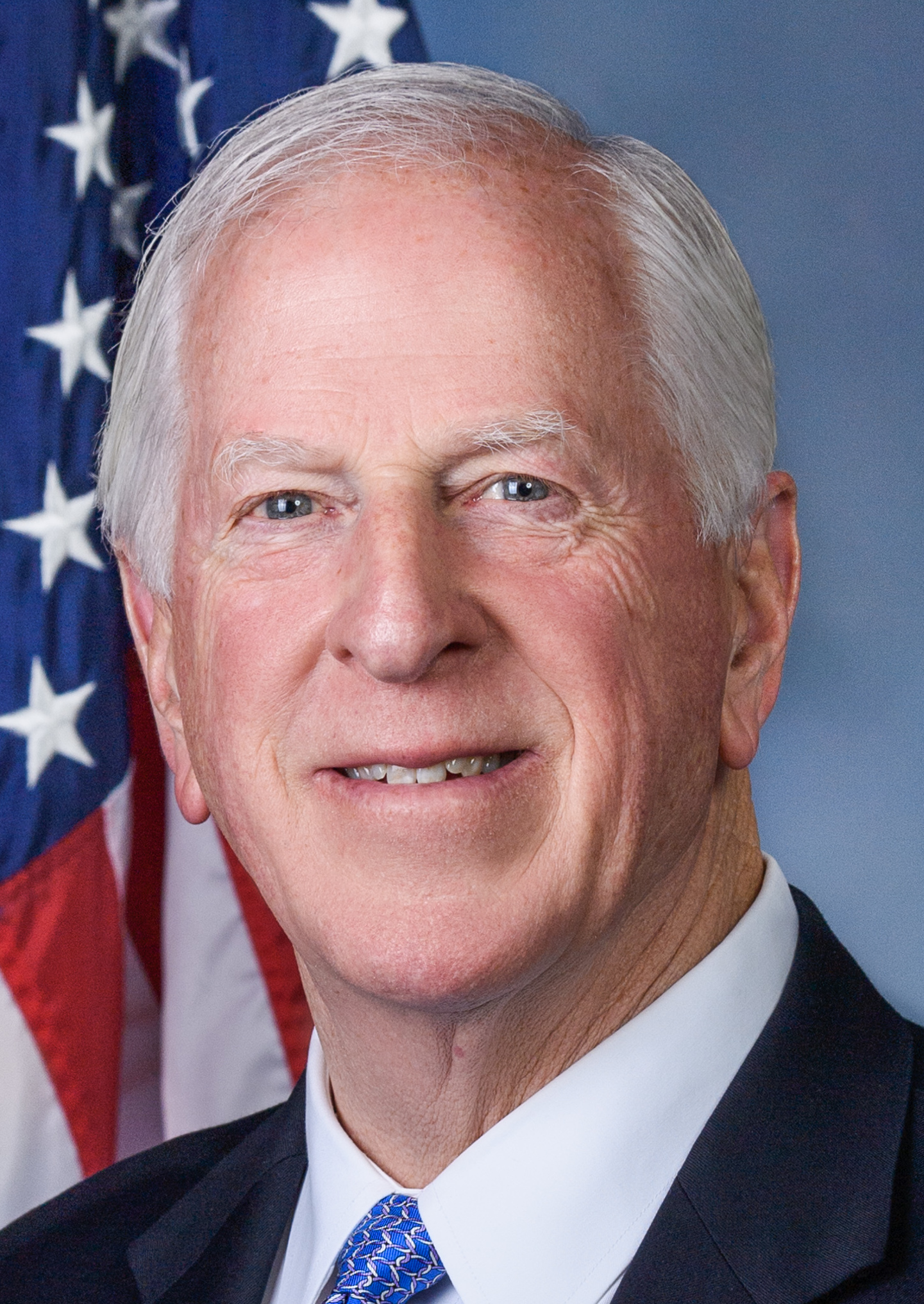

Nominee	Mike Thompson	Anthony Mills
Party	Democratic	No party preference
Popular vote	205,860	55,158
Percentage	78.9%	21.1%
- County results Thompson: 60–70% 70–80% 80–90%
U.S. Representative before election
Mike Thompson
Democratic
Elected U.S. Representative
Mike Thompson
Democratic

The 5th district is based in the North Bay and includes Napa, Santa Rosa, and Vallejo. Incumbent Democrat Mike Thompson, who had represented the 5th district since 2013 and previously represented the 1st district from 1999 to 2013, ran for re-election. He was re-elected with 76.9% of the vote in 2016. The district had a PVI of D+21.

=== Primary election ===
==== Democratic candidates ====
===== Advanced to general =====
- Mike Thompson, incumbent U.S. representative

==== Republican candidates ====
===== Withdrawn =====
- Douglas S. Van Raam, independent candidate for this seat in 2014

==== Green candidates ====
===== Eliminated in primary =====
- Jason Kishineff, homemaker

==== Other candidates ====
===== Advanced to general =====
- Anthony Mills, mariner

===== Eliminated in primary =====
- Nils Palsson, teacher, nonprofit director and candidate for this seat in 2016

==== Endorsements ====
Jason Kishineff (G)

Organizations

- Peace and Freedom Party

Local officials

- Gayle McLaughlin (Independent), former mayor of Richmond

==== Results ====
Nonpartisan blanket primary results
Party	Candidate	Votes	%
Democratic	Mike Thompson (incumbent)	121,428	79.3
No party preference	Anthony Mills	13,538	8.8
No party preference	Nils Palsson	12,652	8.3
Green	Jason Kishineff	5,458	3.6
Total votes		153,076	100.0

=== General election ===
==== Predictions ====
Source	Ranking	As of
The Cook Political Report	Safe D	November 5, 2018
Inside Elections	Safe D	November 5, 2018
Sabato's Crystal Ball	Safe D	November 5, 2018
RealClearPolitics	Safe D	November 5, 2018
Daily Kos	Safe D	November 5, 2018
538	Safe D	November 7, 2018
CNN	Safe D	October 31, 2018
Politico	Safe D	November 4, 2018

==== Endorsements ====
Mike Thompson (D)

Organizations

- J Street PAC

==== Results ====
California's 5th congressional district election, 2018
Party	Candidate	Votes	%
Democratic	Mike Thompson (incumbent)	205,860	78.9
No party preference	Anthony Mills	55,158	21.1
Total votes		261,018	100.0
Democratic hold			

== District 6 ==
2018 California's 6th congressional district election
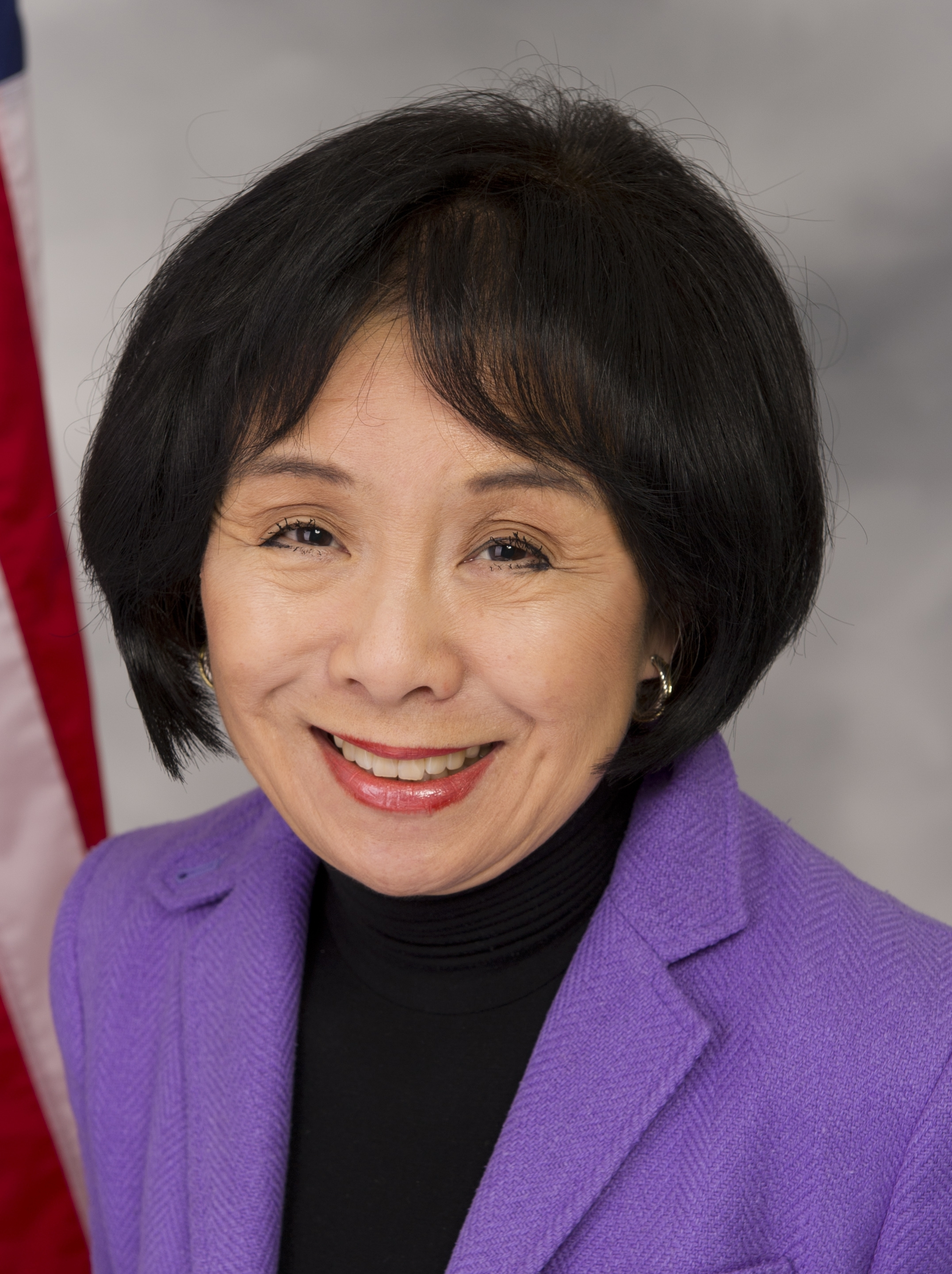

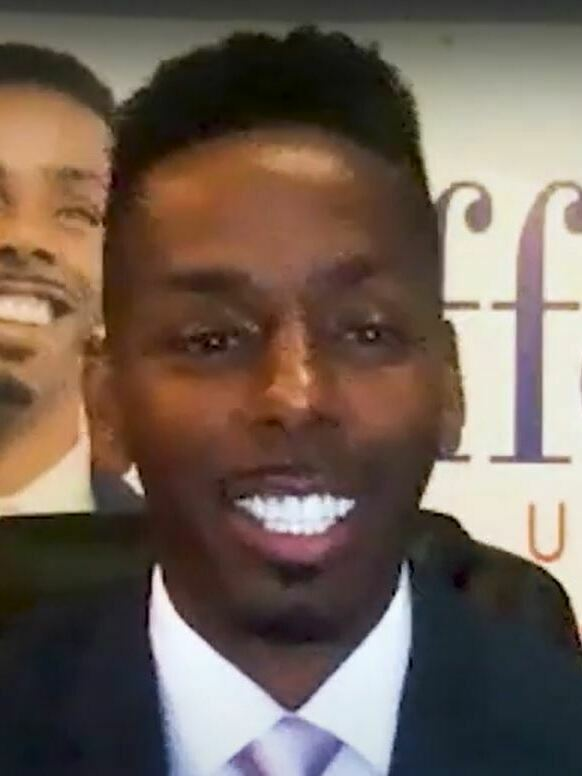
Nominee	Doris Matsui	Jrmar Jefferson
Party	Democratic	Democratic
Popular vote	162,411	39,528
Percentage	80.4%	19.6%
U.S. Representative before election
Doris Matsui
Democratic
Elected U.S. Representative
Doris Matsui
Democratic

The 6th district is based in north central California and includes Sacramento. Democrat Doris Matsui, who had represented the 6th district since 2013 and previously represented the 5th district from 2005 to 2013, ran for re-election. She was re-elected with 75.4% of the vote in 2016. The district had a PVI of D+21.

=== Primary election ===
==== Democratic candidates ====
===== Advanced to general =====
- Jrmar Jefferson, business executive
- Doris Matsui, incumbent U.S. representative

==== Results ====
Nonpartisan blanket primary results
Party	Candidate	Votes	%
Democratic	Doris Matsui (incumbent)	99,789	87.9
Democratic	Jrmar Jefferson	13,786	12.1
Democratic	Ralph Nwobi (write-in)	9	0.0
Total votes		113,584	100.0

=== General election ===
==== Predictions ====
Source	Ranking	As of
The Cook Political Report	Safe D	November 5, 2018
Inside Elections	Safe D	November 5, 2018
Sabato's Crystal Ball	Safe D	November 5, 2018
RealClearPolitics	Safe D	November 5, 2018
Daily Kos	Safe D	November 5, 2018
538	Safe D	November 7, 2018
CNN	Safe D	October 31, 2018
Politico	Safe D	November 4, 2018

==== Results ====
California's 6th congressional district election, 2018
Party	Candidate	Votes	%
Democratic	Doris Matsui (incumbent)	162,411	80.4
Democratic	Jrmar Jefferson	39,528	19.6
Total votes		201,939	100.0
Democratic hold			

== District 7 ==
2018 California's 7th congressional district election
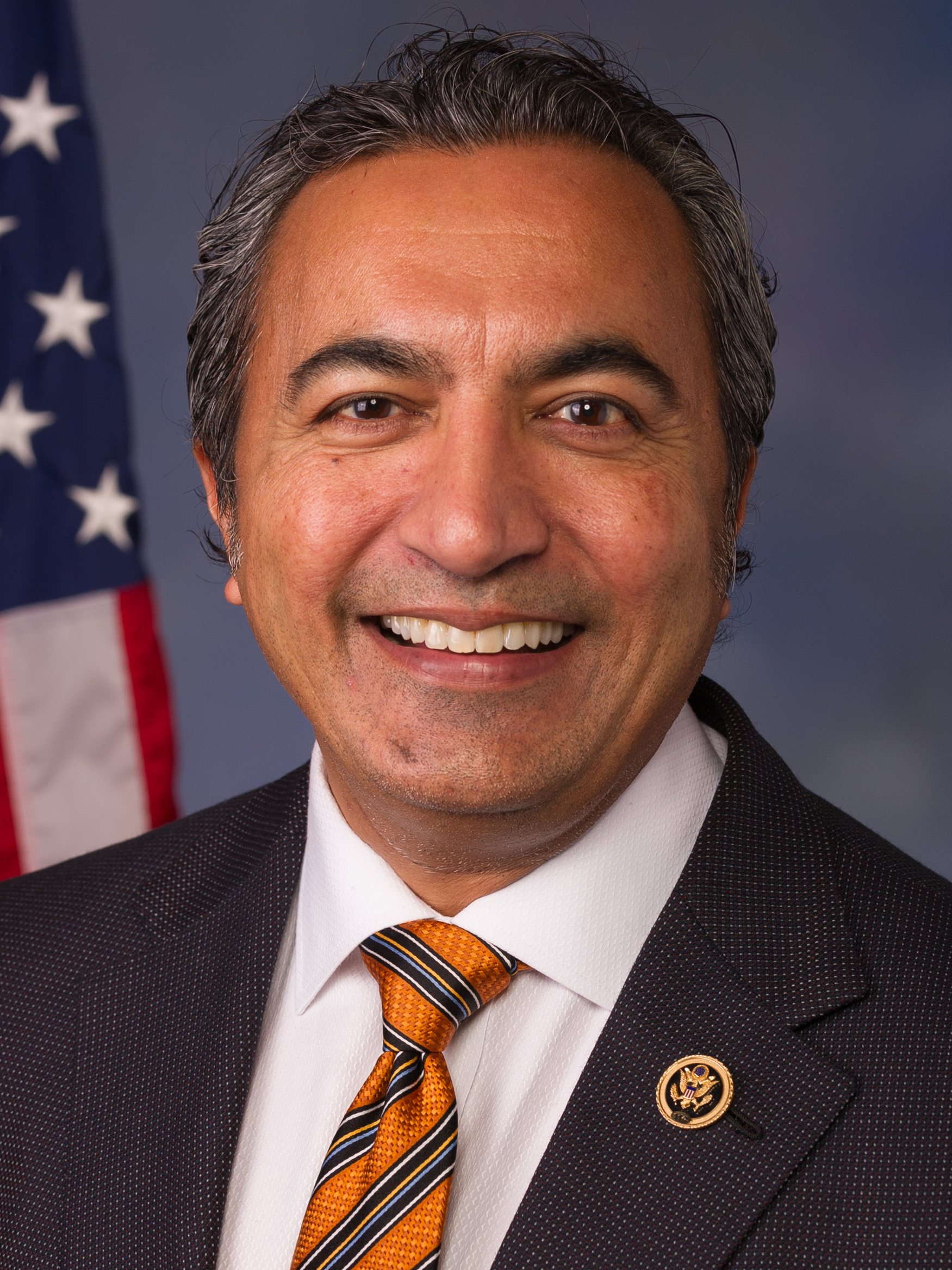

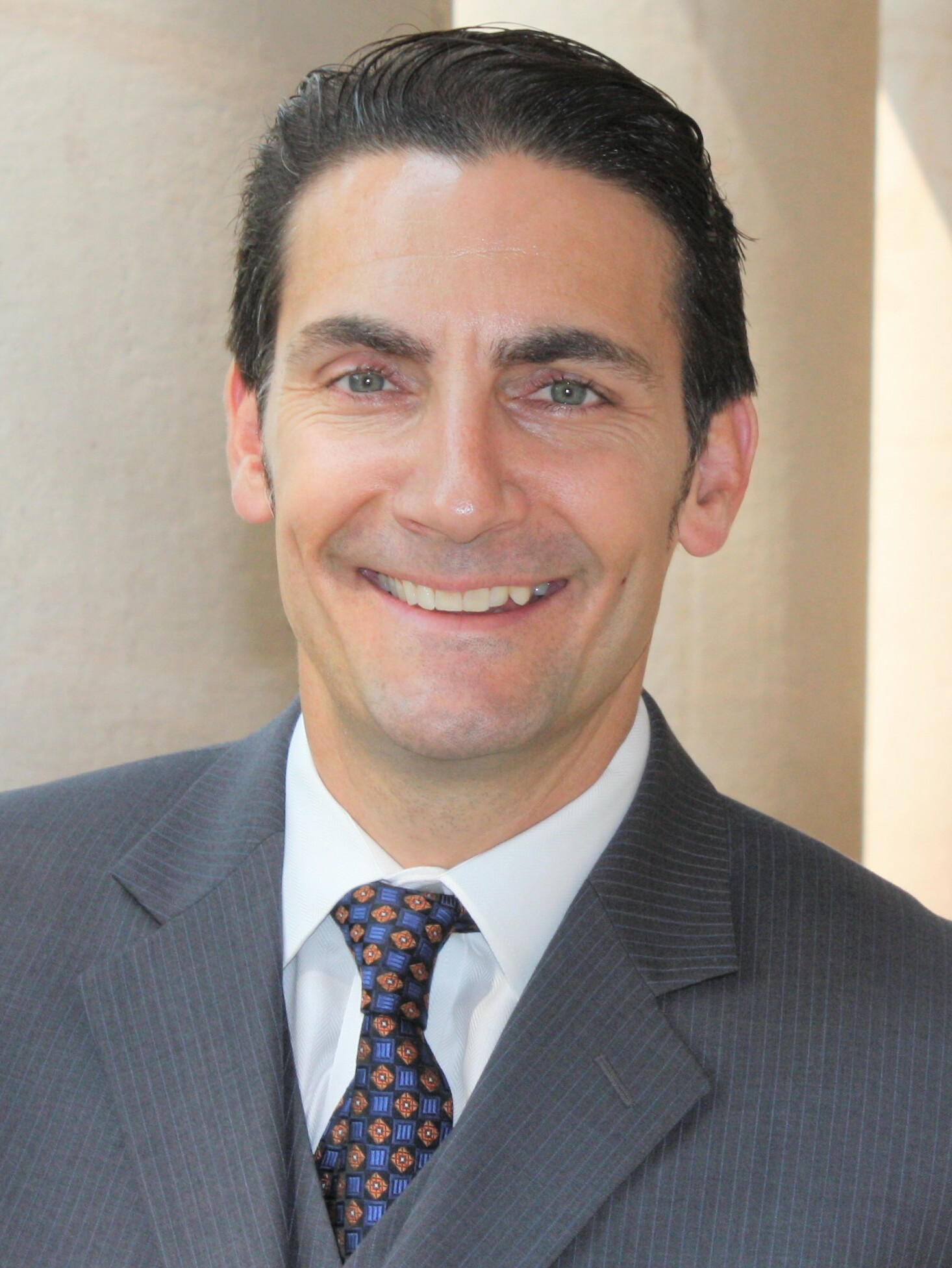
Nominee	Ami Bera	Andrew Grant
Party	Democratic	Republican
Popular vote	155,016	126,601
Percentage	55.0%	45.0%
- County results Bera: 50–60%
U.S. Representative before election
Ami Bera
Democratic
Elected U.S. Representative
Ami Bera
Democratic

The 7th district is based in north central California and includes southern and eastern Sacramento County. Democrat Ami Bera, who had represented the 7th district since 2013, ran for re-election. He was re-elected with 51.2% of the vote in 2016. The district had a PVI of D+3.

=== Primary election ===
==== Democratic candidates ====
===== Advanced to general =====
- Ami Bera, incumbent U.S. representative

===== Withdrawn =====
- Brad Westmoreland, lawyer

==== Republican candidates ====
California's 7th district was included on the list of Democratic-held seats being targeted by the National Republican Congressional Committee in 2018.

===== Advanced to general =====
- Andrew Grant, U.S. Marine officer and businessman

===== Eliminated in primary =====
- Yona Barash, cancer surgeon

===== Withdrawn =====
- Omba Kipuke, public activist

===== Declined =====
- Scott Jones, Sacramento County sheriff and general election candidate for this seat in 2016

==== Green candidates ====
===== Eliminated in primary =====
- Robert Richardson, software developer

==== Independent candidates ====
===== Eliminated in primary =====
- Reginald Claytor, aerospace mechanical worker

==== Endorsements ====
Robert Christian "Chris" Richardson (G)

Organizations

- Peace and Freedom Party

==== Results ====
Nonpartisan blanket primary results
Party	Candidate	Votes	%
Democratic	Ami Bera (incumbent)	84,776	51.7
Republican	Andrew Grant	51,221	31.2
Republican	Yona Barash	22,845	13.9
Green	Robert Christian "Chris" Richardson	3,183	1.9
No party preference	Reginald Claytor	2,095	1.3
Total votes		164,120	100.0

=== General election ===
==== Endorsements ====
Ami Bera (D)

Organizations

- Democratic Congressional Campaign Committee "Frontline" Program
Andrew Grant (R)

Organizations

- National Republican Congressional Committee "On the Radar" Program

==== Polling ====
Poll source	Date(s) administered	Sample size	Margin of error	Ami Bera (D)	Andrew Grant (R)	Undecided
Public Opinion Strategies (R-Grant)	June 12–14, 2018	400	± 4.9%	50%	41%	9%

==== Predictions ====
Source	Ranking	As of
The Cook Political Report	Likely D	November 5, 2018
Inside Elections	Safe D	November 5, 2018
Sabato's Crystal Ball	Likely D	November 5, 2018
RCP	Lean D	November 5, 2018
Daily Kos	Safe D	November 5, 2018
538	Safe D	November 7, 2018
CNN	Safe D	October 31, 2018
Politico	Lean D	November 4, 2018

==== Results ====
California's 7th congressional district election, 2018
Party	Candidate	Votes	%
Democratic	Ami Bera (incumbent)	155,016	55.0
Republican	Andrew Grant	126,601	45.0
Majority		28,415	10.0
Total votes		281,617	100.0
Democratic hold			

== District 8 ==
2018 California's 8th congressional district election
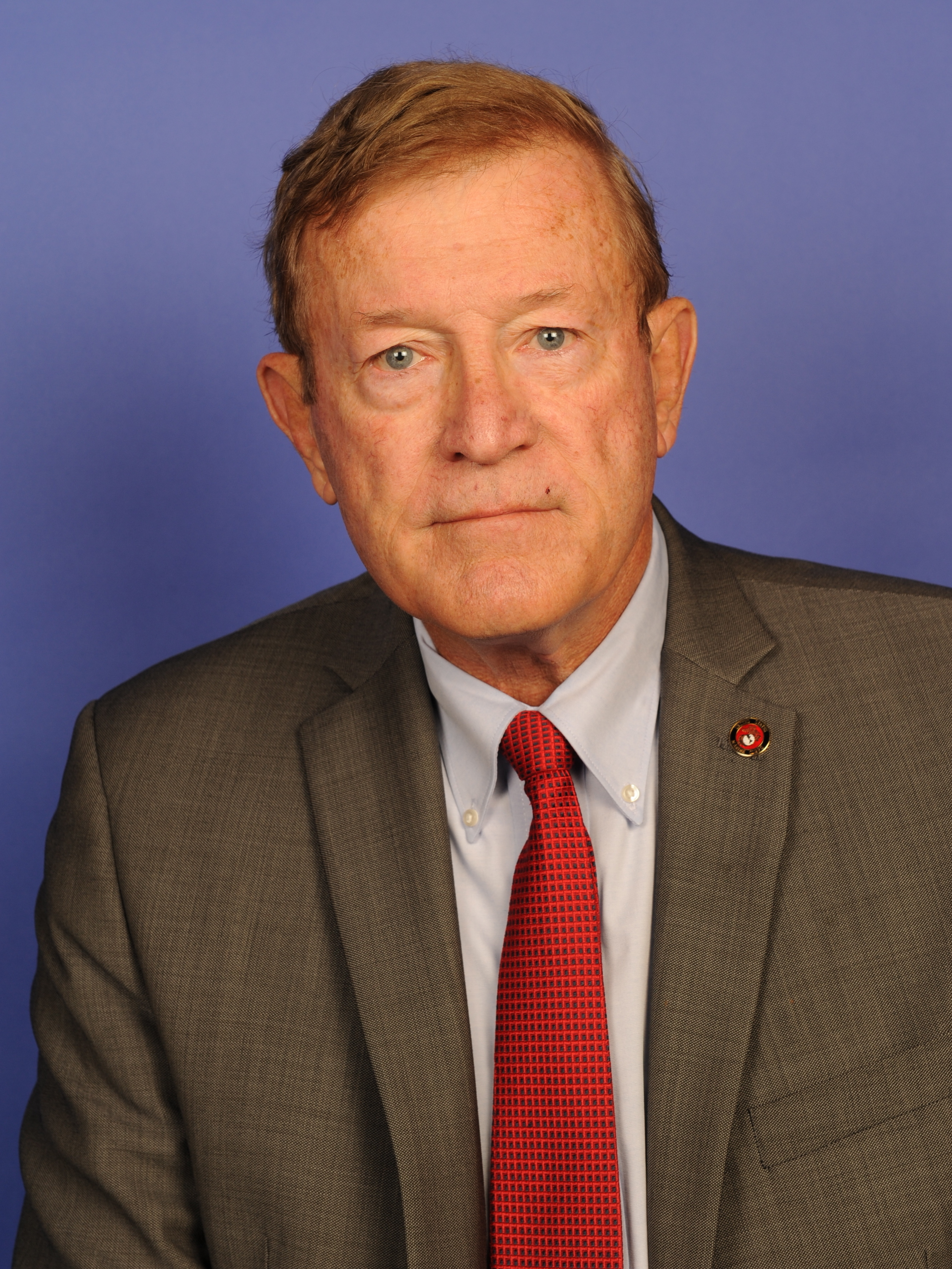

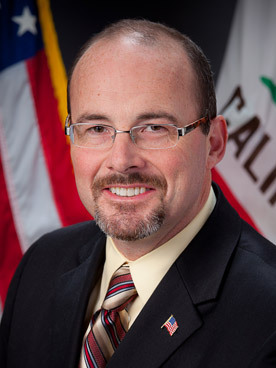
Nominee	Paul Cook	Tim Donnelly
Party	Republican	Republican
Popular vote	102,415	68,370
Percentage	60%	40%
U.S. Representative before election
Paul Cook
Republican
Elected U.S. Representative
Paul Cook
Republican

The 8th district is based in the eastern High Desert and includes Victorville and Yucaipa. Incumbent Republican Paul Cook, who had represented the 8th district since 2013, ran for re-election. He was re-elected with 62.3% of the vote in 2016. The district had a PVI of R+9.

=== Primary election ===
==== Republican candidates ====
===== Advanced to general =====
- Paul Cook, incumbent U.S. representative
- Tim Donnelly, former state assembly member, candidate for governor in 2014 and for this seat in 2016

==== Democratic candidates ====
===== Eliminated in primary =====
- Marge Doyle, registered nurse
- Ronald O'Donnell, educator, author, businessman and general election candidate for state senator from 23rd district in 2016
- Rita Ramirez, retired college professor and general election candidate for this seat in 2016

==== Results ====
Nonpartisan blanket primary results
Party	Candidate	Votes	%
Republican	Paul Cook (incumbent)	44,482	40.8
Republican	Tim Donnelly	24,933	22.8
Democratic	Marjorie "Marge" Doyle	23,675	21.7
Democratic	Rita Ramirez	10,990	10.1
Democratic	Ronald J. O'Donnell	5,049	4.6
Republican	Joseph Napolitano (write-in)	0	0.0
Total votes		109,129	100.0

=== General election ===
==== Predictions ====
Source	Ranking	As of
The Cook Political Report	Safe R	November 5, 2018
Inside Elections	Safe R	November 5, 2018
Sabato's Crystal Ball	Safe R	November 5, 2018
RealClearPolitics	Safe R	November 5, 2018
Daily Kos	Safe R	November 5, 2018
538	Safe R	November 7, 2018
CNN	Safe R	October 31, 2018
Politico	Safe R	November 4, 2018

==== Results ====
California's 8th congressional district election, 2018
Party	Candidate	Votes	%
Republican	Paul Cook (incumbent)	102,415	60.0
Republican	Tim Donnelly	68,370	40.0
Total votes		170,785	100.0
Republican hold			

== District 9 ==
2018 California's 9th congressional district election

Nominee	Jerry McNerney	Marla Livengood
Party	Democratic	Republican
Popular vote	113,414	87,349
Percentage	56.5%	43.5%
U.S. Representative
Livengood: 50–60%
McNerney: 50–60% 60–70% before election
Jerry McNerney
Democratic
Elected U.S. Representative
Livengood: 50–60%
McNerney: 50–60% 60–70%
Jerry McNerney
Democratic

The 9th district is based in the Central Valley and includes the San Joaquin Delta and Stockton. Incumbent Democrat Jerry McNerney, who had represented the 9th district since 2013 and previously represented the 11th district from 2007 to 2013, ran for re-election. He was re-elected with 57.4% of the vote in 2016. The district had a PVI of D+8.

=== Primary election ===
==== Democratic candidates ====
===== Advanced to general =====
- Jerry McNerney, incumbent U.S. representative

==== Republican candidates ====
===== Advanced to general =====
- Marla Livengood, agriculture policy advisor

===== Withdrawn =====
- Marco Gutierrez

==== Results ====
Nonpartisan blanket primary results
Party	Candidate	Votes	%
Democratic	Jerry McNerney (incumbent)	55,923	53.2
Republican	Marla Livengood	43,242	41.1
American Independent	Mike Tsarnas	6,038	5.7
Total votes		105,203	100.0

=== General election ===
==== Predictions ====
Source	Ranking	As of
The Cook Political Report	Safe D	November 5, 2018
Inside Elections	Safe D	November 5, 2018
Sabato's Crystal Ball	Safe D	November 5, 2018
RealClearPolitics	Safe D	November 5, 2018
Daily Kos	Safe D	November 5, 2018
538	Safe D	November 7, 2018
CNN	Safe D	October 31, 2018
Politico	Safe D	November 4, 2018

==== Endorsements ====
Jerry McNerney (D)

Organizations

- J Street PAC

==== Results ====
California's 9th congressional district election, 2018
Party	Candidate	Votes	%
Democratic	Jerry McNerney (incumbent)	113,414	56.5
Republican	Marla Livengood	87,349	43.5
Total votes		200,763	100.0
Democratic hold			

== District 10 ==
2018 California's 10th congressional district election
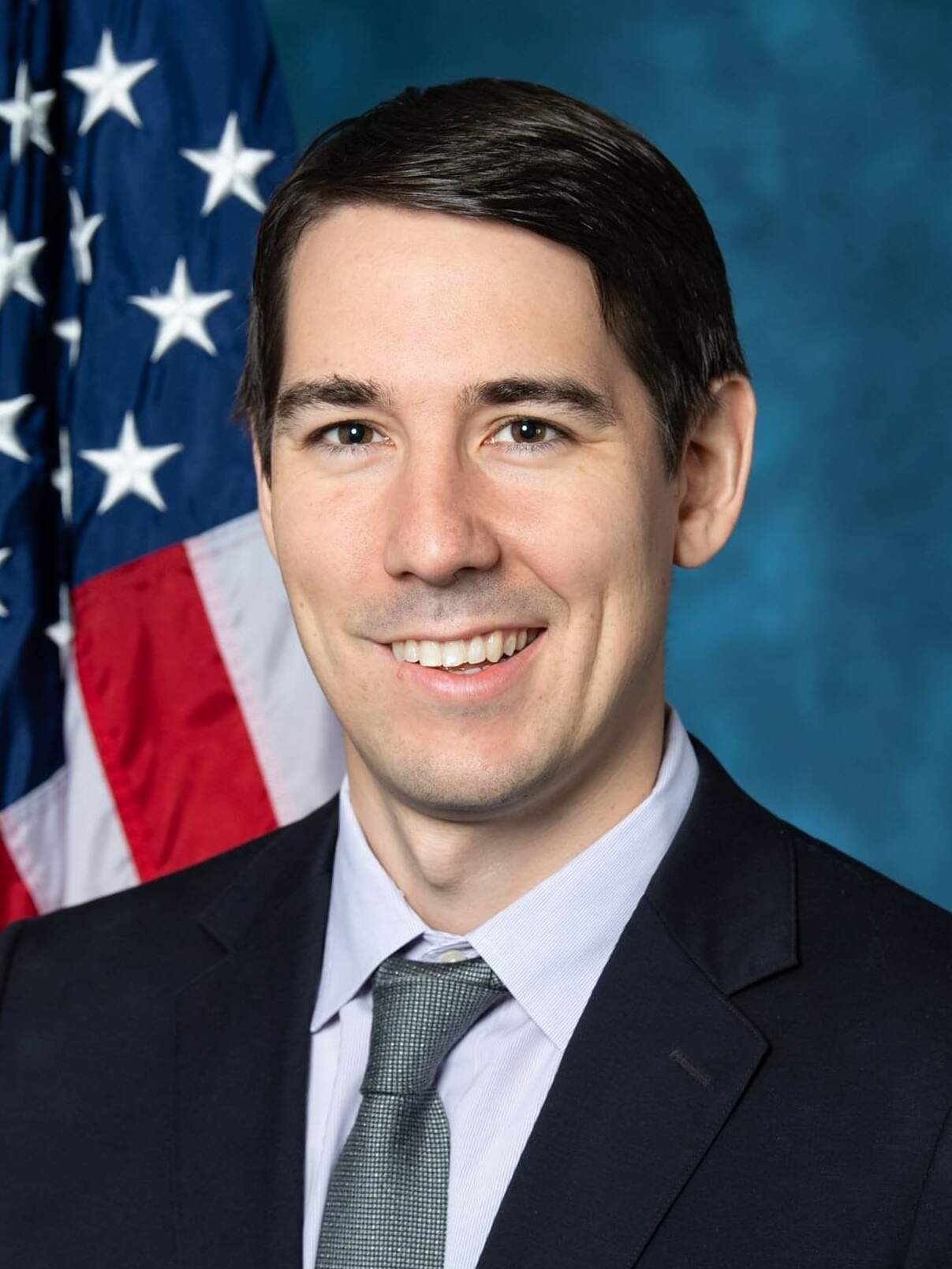

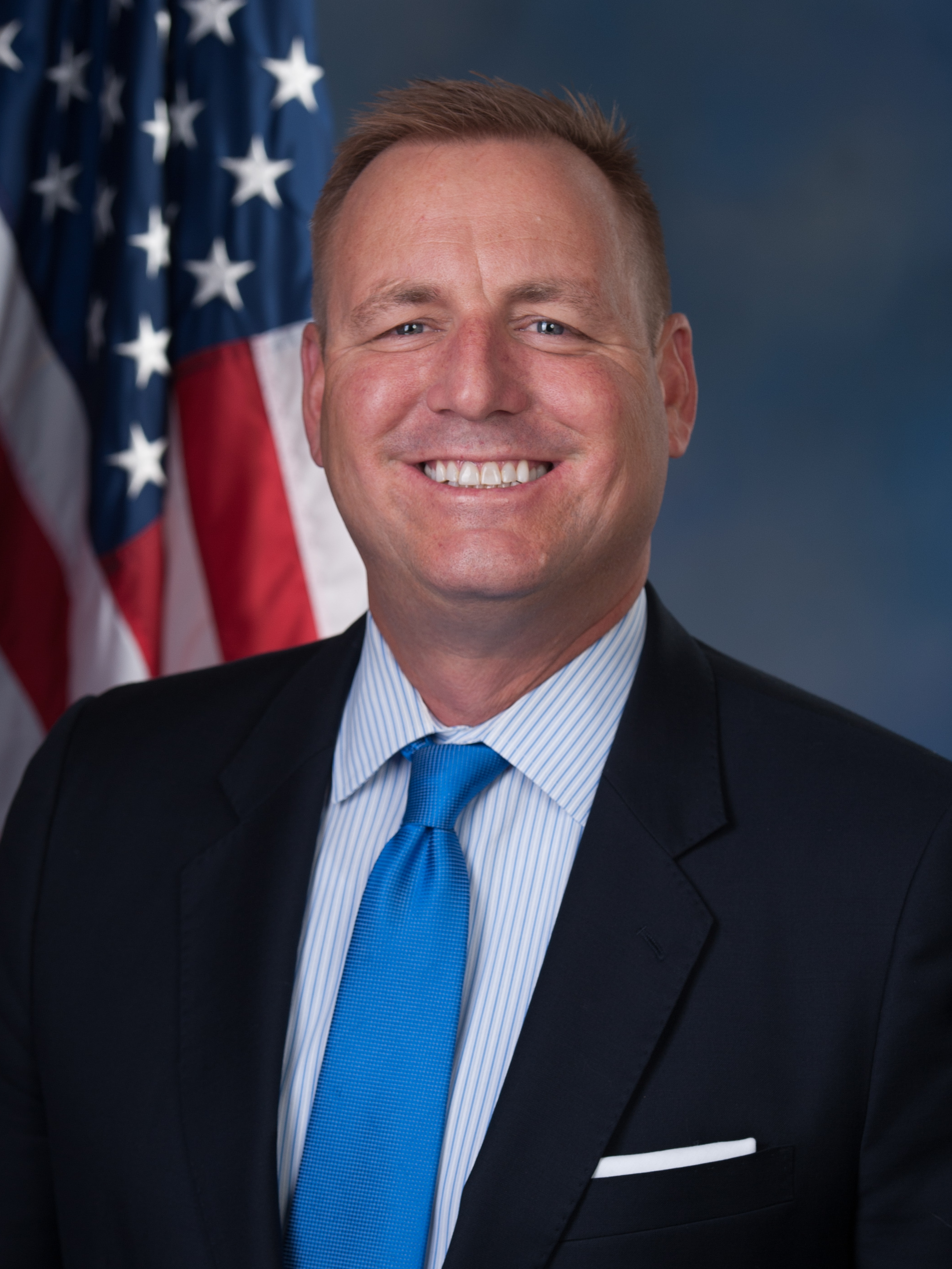
Nominee	Josh Harder	Jeff Denham
Party	Democratic	Republican
Popular vote	115,945	105,955
Percentage	52.3%	47.7%
- County results Harder: 50–60%
U.S. Representative before election
Jeff Denham
Republican
Elected U.S. Representative
Josh Harder
Democratic

The 10th district was based in the Central Valley and included Modesto (and the remainder of Stanislaus County), Manteca, and Tracy (with other portions of southern San Joaquin County). Republican Jeff Denham, who had represented the 10th district since 2013 and previously represented the 19th district from 2011 to 2013, ran for re-election. He was re-elected with 51.7% of the vote in 2016. The district had a PVI of EVEN.

=== Primary election ===
==== Republican candidates ====
===== Advanced to general =====
- Jeff Denham, incumbent U.S. representative

===== Eliminated in primary =====
- Ted Howze, veterinarian

==== Democratic candidates ====
California's 10th district was included on the list of Republican-held seats being targeted by the Democratic Congressional Campaign Committee in 2018.

===== Advanced to general =====
- Josh Harder, educator and venture capitalist

===== Eliminated in primary =====
- Mike Barkley, lawyer, accountant, programmer and candidate for this seat in 2014 & 2016
- Michael Eggman, farmer, small businessman and general election candidate for this seat in 2014 & 2016
- Virginia Madueno, former mayor of Riverbank
- Sue Zwahlen, registered nurse and former Modesto City Schools Board of Education member

===== Withdrawn =====
- Lisa Battista
- Mateo Morelos Bedolla
- TJ Cox, engineer and small businessman (running in the 21st)
- Dotty Nygard, registered nurse and former Riverbank City Council member
- Seth Vaughn

===== Declined =====
- Cathleen Galgiani, state senator from the 5th district
- José Hernández, former NASA astronaut and general election candidate for this seat in 2012

==== Independent candidates ====
===== Withdrawn =====
- Scott Shoblom, attorney
- Terra Snover

==== Polling ====
Poll source	Date(s) administered	Sample size	Margin of error	Jeff Denham (R)	Michael Eggman (D)	Josh Harder (D)	Virginia Madueño (D)	Sue Zwahlen (D)	Other	Undecided
Benenson Strategy Group (D-Harder)	May 2–6, 2018	550	± 4.2%	42%	10%	13%	6%	6%	5%	4%

==== Results ====
Results by county: Denham—30–40%

Nonpartisan blanket primary results
Party	Candidate	Votes	%
Republican	Jeff Denham (incumbent)	45,719	37.5
Democratic	Josh Harder	20,742	17.0
Republican	Ted D. Howze	17,723	14.6
Democratic	Michael Eggman	12,446	10.2
Democratic	Virginia Madueño	11,178	9.2
Democratic	Sue Zwahlen	9,945	8.2
Democratic	Michael J. "Mike" Barkley	2,904	2.4
Democratic	Dotty Nygard (withdrawn)	1,100	0.9
Total votes		121,757	100.0

=== General election ===
==== Endorsements ====
Jeff Denham (R)

Organizations

- National Republican Congressional Committee "Patriot" Program
Josh Harder (D)

U.S. executive branch officials

- Barack Obama, 44th president of the United States

Labor unions

- California Labor Federation
- California Teachers Association
- National Education Association

Organizations

- Brady Campaign to Prevent Gun Violence
- Council for a Livable World
- Democratic Congressional Campaign Committee "Red to Blue" Program
- End Citizens United
- J Street PAC
- League of Conservation Voters
- Sierra Club

==== Debate ====
2018 California's 10th congressional district debate
No.	Date	Host	Moderator	Link	Republican	Democratic
Key: P Participant A Absent N Not invited I Invited W Withdrawn						
Key: P Participant A Absent N Not invited I Invited W Withdrawn					Jeff Denham	Josh Harder
1	September 22, 2018	Turlock Journal; Univision 19	Kristina Hacker		P	P

==== Polling ====
Poll source	Date(s) administered	Sample size	Margin of error	Jeff Denham (R)	Josh Harder (D)	Undecided
NYT Upshot/Siena College	October 21–25, 2018	501	± 4.9%	45%	47%	8%
UC Berkeley	September 16–23, 2018	726	± 5.0%	45%	50%	5%
Garin-Hart-Yang Research (D)	June 27 – July 1, 2018	501	–	48%	48%	4%
ALG Research (D-Eggman)	March 13–15, 2018	400	–	48%	37%	15%

==== Predictions ====
Source	Ranking	As of
The Cook Political Report	Tossup	November 5, 2018
Inside Elections	Tossup	November 5, 2018
Sabato's Crystal Ball	Lean D (flip)	November 5, 2018
RCP	Tossup	November 5, 2018
Daily Kos	Tossup	November 5, 2018
538	Likely D (flip)	November 7, 2018
CNN	Tossup	October 31, 2018
Politico	Tossup	November 4, 2018

==== Results ====
Although Denham led the reported vote count for several days, Harder ultimately won the general election by almost 10,000 votes, with Denham conceding defeat on November 14.

California's 10th congressional district election, 2018
Party	Candidate	Votes	%
Democratic	Josh Harder	115,945	52.3
Republican	Jeff Denham (incumbent)	105,955	47.7
Majority		9,990	4.6
Total votes		221,900	100.0
Democratic gain from Republican			

== District 11 ==
2018 California's 11th congressional district election
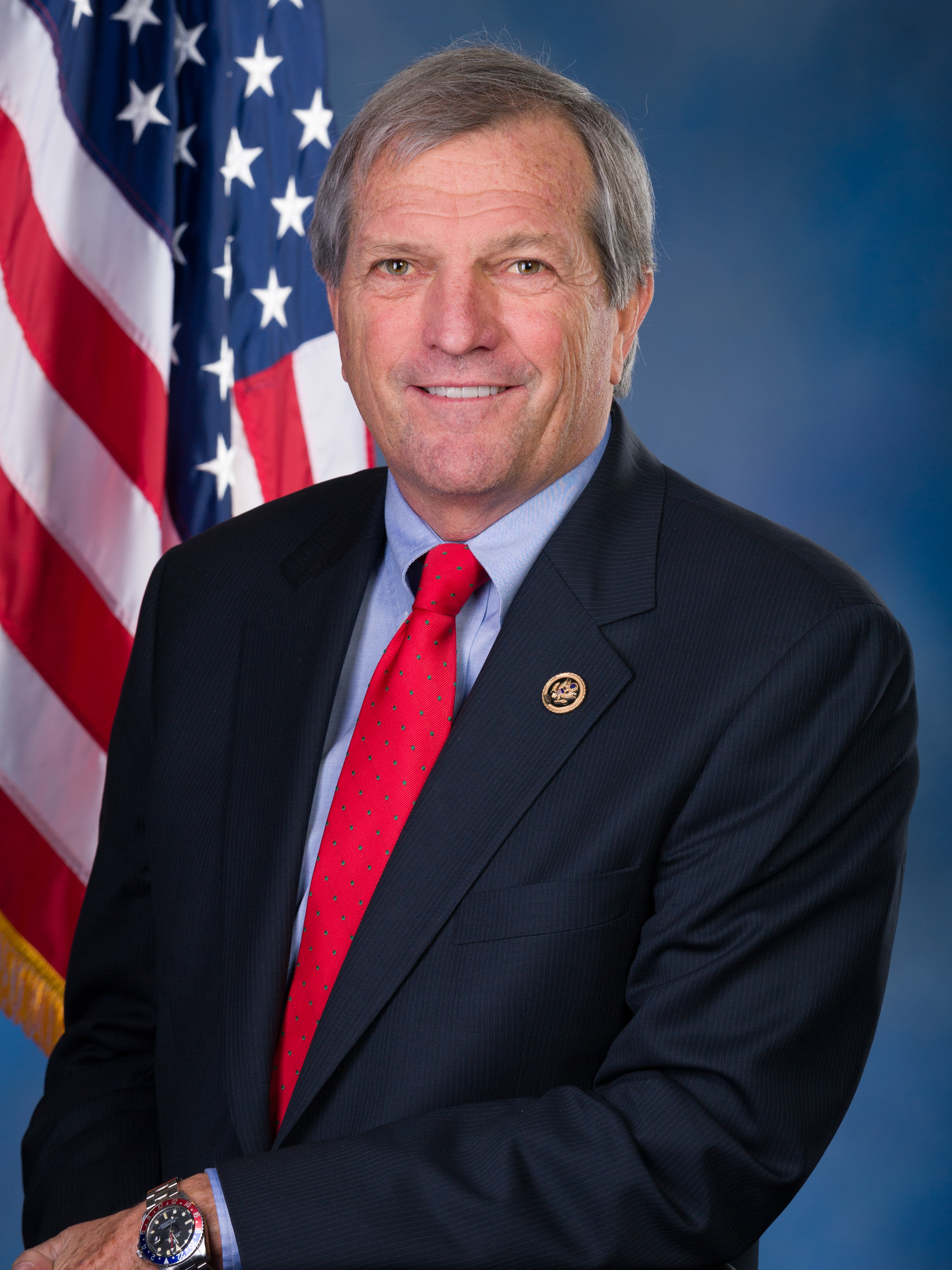

Nominee	Mark DeSaulnier	John Fitzgerald
Party	Democratic	Republican
Popular vote	204,369	71,312
Percentage	74.1%	25.9%
- County results Desaulnier: 70–80%
U.S. Representative before election
Mark DeSaulnier
Democratic
Elected U.S. Representative
Mark DeSaulnier
Democratic

The 11th district is based in the East Bay and includes Concord and Richmond. Incumbent Democrat Mark DeSaulnier, who had represented the 11th district since 2015, ran for re-election. He was re-elected with 72.1% of the vote in 2016. The district had a PVI of D+21.

=== Primary election ===
==== Democratic candidates ====
===== Advanced to general =====
- Mark DeSaulnier, incumbent U.S. representative

===== Eliminated in primary =====
- Dennis Lytton, transportation manager

==== Republican candidates ====
===== Advanced to general =====
- John Fitzgerald, small business owner

==== Independent candidates ====
===== Eliminated in primary =====
- Chris Wood, civil engineer

==== Results ====
Nonpartisan blanket primary results
Party	Candidate	Votes	%
Democratic	Mark DeSaulnier (incumbent)	107,115	68.3
Republican	John Fitzgerald	36,279	23.1
Democratic	Dennis Lytton	8,695	5.5
No party preference	Chris Wood	4,789	3.1
Total votes		156,878	100.0

=== General election ===
==== Predictions ====
Source	Ranking	As of
The Cook Political Report	Safe D	November 5, 2018
Inside Elections	Safe D	November 5, 2018
Sabato's Crystal Ball	Safe D	November 5, 2018
RealClearPolitics	Safe D	November 5, 2018
Daily Kos	Safe D	November 5, 2018
538	Safe D	November 7, 2018
CNN	Safe D	October 31, 2018
Politico	Safe D	November 4, 2018

==== Endorsements ====
Mark DeSaulnier (D)

Organizations

- J Street PAC

==== Results ====
California's 11th congressional district election, 2018
Party	Candidate	Votes	%
Democratic	Mark DeSaulnier (incumbent)	204,369	74.1
Republican	John Fitzgerald	71,312	25.9
Total votes		275,681	100.0
Democratic hold			

== District 12 ==
2018 California's 12th congressional district election
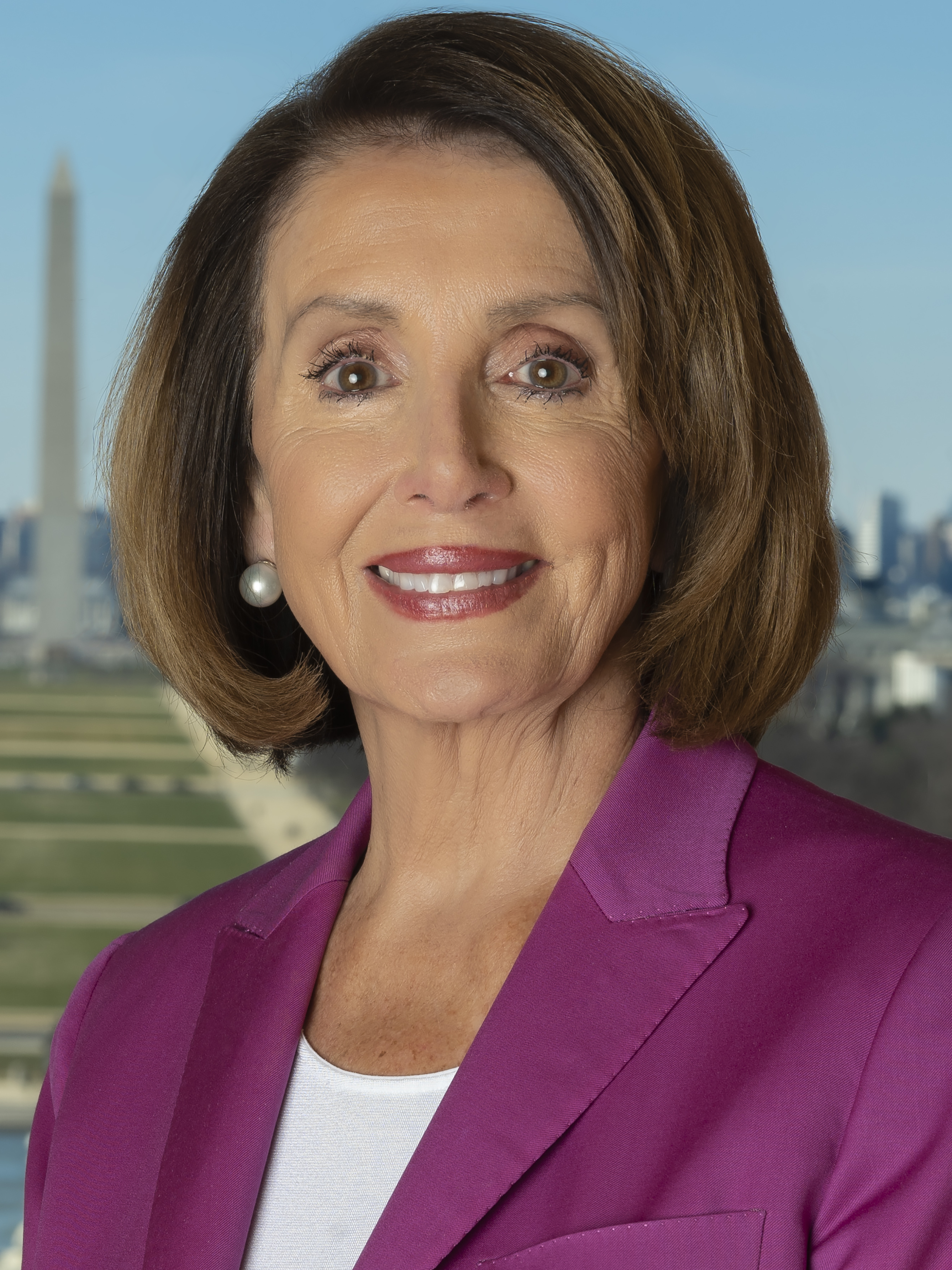

Nominee	Nancy Pelosi	Lisa Remmer
Party	Democratic	Republican
Popular vote	275,292	41,780
Percentage	86.8%	13.2%
- County results Pelosi: 80–90%
U.S. Representative before election
Nancy Pelosi
Democratic
Elected U.S. Representative
Nancy Pelosi
Democratic

The 12th district is based in the Bay Area and includes most of San Francisco. House Democratic Leader and former Speaker Nancy Pelosi, who had represented the 12th district since 2013 and previously represented the 8th district from 1993 to 2013 and the 5th district from 1987 until 1993, ran for re-election. She was re-elected with 80.9% of the vote in 2016. The district had a PVI of D+37.

=== Primary election ===
==== Democratic candidates ====
===== Advanced to general =====
- Nancy Pelosi, incumbent U.S. representative, House Democratic Leader and former Speaker of the House

===== Eliminated in primary =====
- Shahid Buttar, lawyer, advocate and artist
- Stephen Jaffe, civil rights attorney
- Ryan Khojasteh, immigrant rights commissioner

==== Republican candidates ====
===== Advanced to general =====
- Lisa Remmer, educator

===== Withdrawn =====
- Chase Demasi

==== Green candidates ====
===== Eliminated in primary =====
- Barry Hermanson, retired entrepreneur

==== Independent candidates ====
===== Eliminated in primary =====
- Michael Goldstein, lawyer and author

==== Endorsements ====
Shahid Buttar (D)

Organizations

- Progressive Democrats of America
- Veterans for Bernie Sanders

Newspapers

- San Francisco Bay Guardian

Local officials

- John Avalos, former member of the San Francisco Board of Supervisors
- Matt Gonzalez, former president of the San Francisco Board of Supervisors
- Jason West, former mayor of New Paltz, New York

Individuals

- Medea Benjamin, activist and co-founder of Code Pink
- Cindy Cohn, executive director of the Electronic Frontier Foundation
- Cory Doctorow, co-editor of Boing Boing
- Gayle McLaughlin, candidate for Lieutenant Governor of California
- Sascha Meinrath, founder of X-Lab
- Preston Picus, former candidate for California's 12th congressional district
- Linda Sarsour, co-chair of the 2017 Women's March
- Norman Solomon, journalist and founder of the Institute for Public Accuracy
- Trevor Timm, executive director of the Freedom of the Press Foundation
Stephen Jaffe (D)

Organizations

- Demand Universal Healthcare
- SF Berniecrats
- Veterans for Bernie Sanders

Local officials

- Gayle McLaughlin (Independent), former mayor of Richmond

Individuals

- Tim Canova, law professor and candidate for Florida's 23rd congressional district in 2016 and 2018
- Jimmy Dore, comedian and political commentator
- Preston Picus (Independent), candidate for California's 12th congressional district in 2016
- Holly Wood, writer and candidate for Pennsylvania's 10th congressional district in 2018
Barry Hermanson (G)

Local officials

- Matt Gonzalez, former president of the San Francisco Board of Supervisors

==== Results ====
Nonpartisan blanket primary results
Party	Candidate	Votes	%
Democratic	Nancy Pelosi (incumbent)	141,365	68.5
Republican	Lisa Remmer	18,771	9.1
Democratic	Shahid Buttar	17,597	8.5
Democratic	Stephen Jaffe	12,114	5.9
Democratic	Ryan A. Khojasteh	9,498	4.6
Green	Barry Hermanson	4,217	2.0
No party preference	Michael Goldstein	2,820	1.4
Total votes		206,382	100.0

=== General election ===
==== Predictions ====
Source	Ranking	As of
The Cook Political Report	Safe D	November 5, 2018
Inside Elections	Safe D	November 5, 2018
Sabato's Crystal Ball	Safe D	November 5, 2018
RealClearPolitics	Safe D	November 5, 2018
Daily Kos	Safe D	November 5, 2018
538	Safe D	November 7, 2018
CNN	Safe D	October 31, 2018
Politico	Safe D	November 4, 2018

==== Endorsements ====
Nancy Pelosi (D)

Organizations

- End Citizens United
- League of Conservation Voters
- Sierra Club

==== Results ====
California's 12th congressional district election, 2018
Party	Candidate	Votes	%
Democratic	Nancy Pelosi (incumbent)	275,292	86.8
Republican	Lisa Remmer	41,780	13.2
Total votes		317,072	100.0
Democratic hold			

== District 13 ==
2018 California's 13th congressional district election
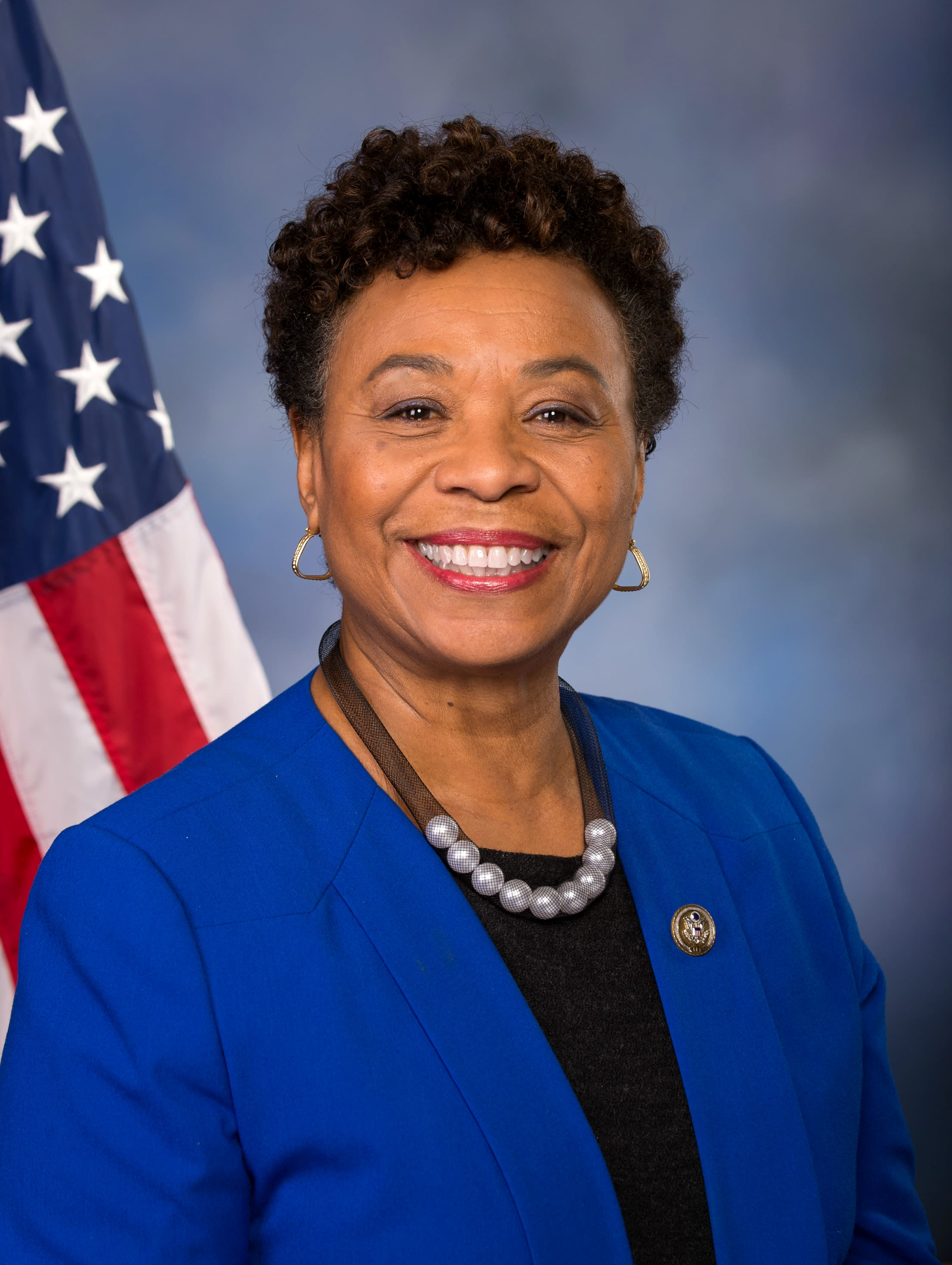

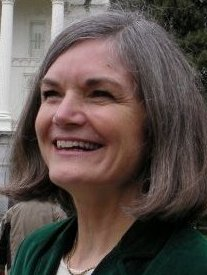
Nominee	Barbara Lee	Laura Wells
Party	Democratic	Green
Popular vote	260,580	34,257
Percentage	88.4%	11.6%
- County results Lee: 80–90%
U.S. Representative before election
Barbara Lee
Democratic
Elected U.S. Representative
Barbara Lee
Democratic

The 13th district is based in the East Bay and includes Berkeley and Oakland. Incumbent Democrat Barbara Lee, who had represented the 13th district since 2013 and previously represented the 9th district from 1998 to 2013, ran for re-election. She was re-elected with 92.0% of the vote in 2016. The district had a PVI of D+40.

=== Primary election ===
==== Democratic candidates ====
===== Advanced to general =====
- Barbara Lee, incumbent U.S. representative

==== Republican candidates ====
===== Eliminated in primary =====
- Jeanne Marie Solnordal

==== Libertarian candidates ====
===== Eliminated in primary =====
- James M. Eyer

==== Green candidates ====
===== Advanced to general =====
- Laura Wells, political activist, financial & business analyst and nominee for governor in 2010

==== Independent candidates ====
===== Eliminated in primary =====
- Lanenna Joiner

==== Results ====
Nonpartisan blanket primary results
Party	Candidate	Votes	%
Democratic	Barbara Lee (incumbent)	159,751	99.3
Green	Laura Wells (write-in)	832	0.5
Republican	Jeanne Marie Solnordal (write-in)	178	0.1
Libertarian	James M. Eyer (write-in)	39	0.0
No party preference	Lanenna Joiner (write-in)	26	0.0
American Independent	Vincent May (write-in)	3	0.0
Total votes		160,829	100.0

=== General election ===
==== Predictions ====
Source	Ranking	As of
The Cook Political Report	Safe D	November 5, 2018
Inside Elections	Safe D	November 5, 2018
Sabato's Crystal Ball	Safe D	November 5, 2018
RealClearPolitics	Safe D	November 5, 2018
Daily Kos	Safe D	November 5, 2018
538	Safe D	November 7, 2018
CNN	Safe D	October 31, 2018
Politico	Safe D	November 4, 2018

==== Endorsements ====
Barbara Lee (D)

Organizations

- J Street PAC

==== Results ====
California's 13th congressional district election, 2018
Party	Candidate	Votes	%
Democratic	Barbara Lee (incumbent)	260,580	88.4
Green	Laura Wells	34,257	11.6
Total votes		294,837	100.0
Democratic hold			

== District 14 ==
2018 California's 14th congressional district election
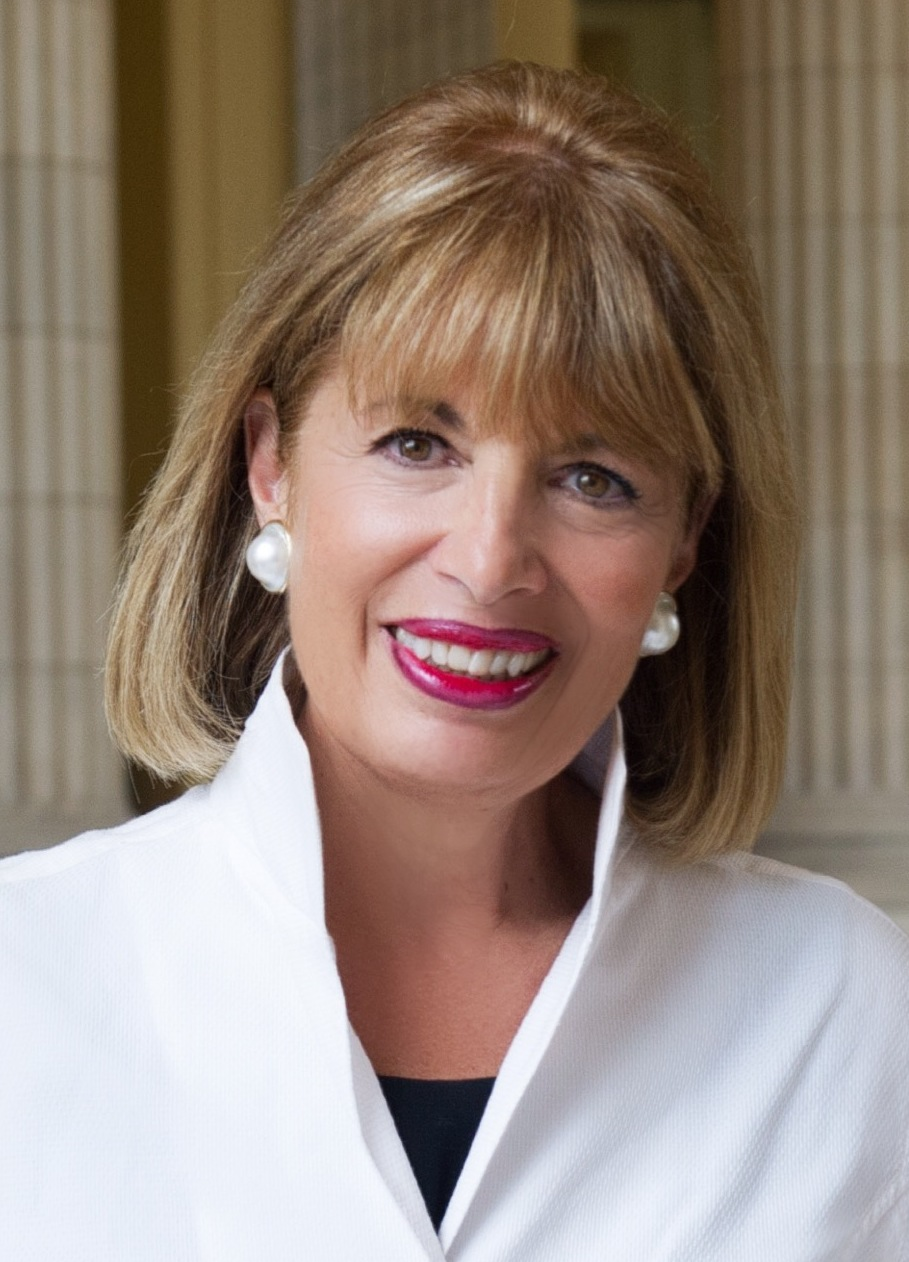

Nominee	Jackie Speier	Cristina Osmeña
Party	Democratic	Republican
Popular vote	211,384	55,439
Percentage	79.2%	20.8%
- County results Speier: 70–80% 80–90%
U.S. Representative before election
Jackie Speier
Democratic
Elected U.S. Representative
Jackie Speier
Democratic

The 14th district is based in the Bay Area and includes most of San Mateo County. Incumbent Democrat Jackie Speier, who had represented the 14th district since 2013 and previously represented the 12th district from 2008 to 2013, ran for re-election. She was re-elected with 80.9% of the vote in 2016. The district had a PVI of D+27.

=== Primary election ===
==== Democratic candidates ====
===== Advanced to general =====
- Jackie Speier, incumbent U.S. representative

==== Republican candidates ====
===== Advanced to general =====
- Cristina Osmeña, solar industry executive

==== Results ====
Nonpartisan blanket primary results
Party	Candidate	Votes	%
Democratic	Jackie Speier (incumbent)	123,900	79.4
Republican	Cristina Osmeña	32,054	20.6
Total votes		155,954	100.0

=== General election ===
==== Predictions ====
Source	Ranking	As of
The Cook Political Report	Safe D	November 5, 2018
Inside Elections	Safe D	November 5, 2018
Sabato's Crystal Ball	Safe D	November 5, 2018
RealClearPolitics	Safe D	November 5, 2018
Daily Kos	Safe D	November 5, 2018
538	Safe D	November 7, 2018
CNN	Safe D	October 31, 2018
Politico	Safe D	November 4, 2018

==== Endorsements ====
Jackie Speier (D)

Organizations

- J Street PAC

==== Results ====
California's 14th congressional district election, 2018
Party	Candidate	Votes	%
Democratic	Jackie Speier (incumbent)	211,384	79.2
Republican	Cristina Osmeña	55,439	20.8
Total votes		266,823	100.0
Democratic hold			

== District 15 ==
2018 California's 15th congressional district election
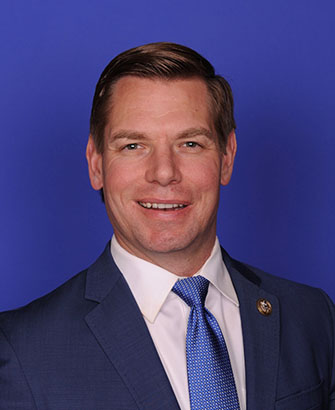

Nominee	Eric Swalwell	Rudy Peters
Party	Democratic	Republican
Popular vote	177,989	65,940
Percentage	73%	27%
- County results Swalwell: 60–70% 70–80%
U.S. Representative before election
Eric Swalwell
Democratic
Elected U.S. Representative
Eric Swalwell
Democratic

The 15th district is based in the East Bay and includes Hayward and Livermore. Incumbent Democrat Eric Swalwell, who had represented the 15th district since 2013, ran for re-election. He was re-elected with 73.8% of the vote in 2016. The district had a PVI of D+20.

=== Primary election ===
==== Democratic candidates ====
===== Advanced to general =====
- Eric Swalwell, incumbent U.S. representative

==== Republican candidates ====
===== Advanced to general =====
- Rudy Peters, small business owner

==== Independent candidates ====
===== Eliminated in primary =====
- Brendan St. John, medical device consultant

==== Results ====
Nonpartisan blanket primary results
Party	Candidate	Votes	%
Democratic	Eric Swalwell (incumbent)	90,971	70.5
Republican	Rudy Peters	33,771	26.2
No party preference	Brendan St. John	4,322	3.3
Total votes		129,064	100.0

=== General election ===
==== Predictions ====
Source	Ranking	As of
The Cook Political Report	Safe D	November 5, 2018
Inside Elections	Safe D	November 5, 2018
Sabato's Crystal Ball	Safe D	November 5, 2018
RealClearPolitics	Safe D	November 5, 2018
Daily Kos	Safe D	November 5, 2018
538	Safe D	November 7, 2018
CNN	Safe D	October 31, 2018
Politico	Safe D	November 4, 2018

==== Endorsements ====
Eric Swalwell (D)

Organizations

- J Street PAC

==== Results ====
California's 15th congressional district election, 2018
Party	Candidate	Votes	%
Democratic	Eric Swalwell (incumbent)	177,989	73.0
Republican	Rudy Peters	65,940	27.0
Total votes		243,929	100.0
Democratic hold			

== District 16 ==
2018 California's 16th congressional district election
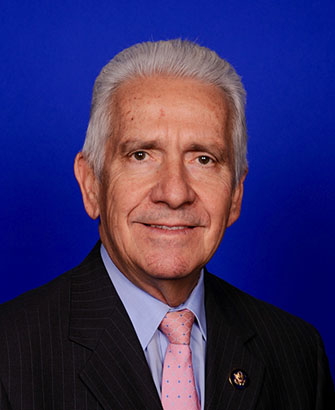

Nominee	Jim Costa	Elizabeth Heng
Party	Democratic	Republican
Popular vote	82,266	60,693
Percentage	57.5%	42.5%
- County results Costa: 50–60% 60–70% Heng: 50–60%
U.S. Representative before election
Jim Costa
Democratic
Elected U.S. Representative
Jim Costa
Democratic

The 16th district is based in the Central Valley and includes Fresno, Madera, and Merced. Incumbent Democrat Jim Costa, who had represented the 16th district since 2013 and previously represented the 20th district from 2005 to 2013, ran for re-election. He was re-elected with 58.0% of the vote in 2016. The district had a PVI of D+9.

=== Primary election ===
==== Democratic candidates ====
===== Advanced to general =====
- Jim Costa, incumbent U.S. representative

==== Republican candidates ====
===== Advanced to general =====
- Elizabeth Heng, small business owner and former House staffer

==== Results ====
Nonpartisan blanket primary results
Party	Candidate	Votes	%
Democratic	Jim Costa (incumbent)	39,527	53.0
Republican	Elizabeth Heng	35,080	47.0
Total votes		74,607	100.0

=== General election ===
==== Campaign ====
As a minority, millennial female running against an established male politician, Heng received a number of comparisons to Alexandria Ocasio-Cortez. Heng gained notoriety during the campaign for aggressive attack ads, including one where she depicted a silver-haired man who resembled Costa walking on a sidewalk in red high heels, which prompted questions of sexism. More controversially her campaign ran an ad featuring images of the Cambodian genocide, part of her family heritage. This ad was banned on Facebook and Twitter, leading to conservative claims of social media bias and unjustified censorship. Both social media sites ended up reversing course and allowed the commercials.

==== Endorsements ====
Elizabeth Heng (R)

Organizations

- National Republican Congressional Committee "Young Guns" Program

==== Polling ====
Poll source	Date(s) administered	Sample size	Margin of error	Jim Costa (D)	Elizabeth Heng (R)	Undecided
SurveyUSA	September 14–19, 2018	515	± 5.2%	51%	40%	9%

==== Predictions ====
Source	Ranking	As of
The Cook Political Report	Likely D	November 5, 2018
Inside Elections	Safe D	November 5, 2018
Sabato's Crystal Ball	Likely D	November 5, 2018
RCP	Safe D	November 5, 2018
Daily Kos	Safe D	November 5, 2018
538	Safe D	November 7, 2018
CNN	Safe D	October 31, 2018
Politico	Likely D	November 4, 2018

==== Results ====
California's 16th congressional district election, 2018
Party	Candidate	Votes	%
Democratic	Jim Costa (incumbent)	82,266	57.5
Republican	Elizabeth Heng	60,693	42.5
Majority		21,573	15.0
Total votes		142,959	100.0
Democratic hold			

== District 17 ==
2018 California's 17th congressional district election
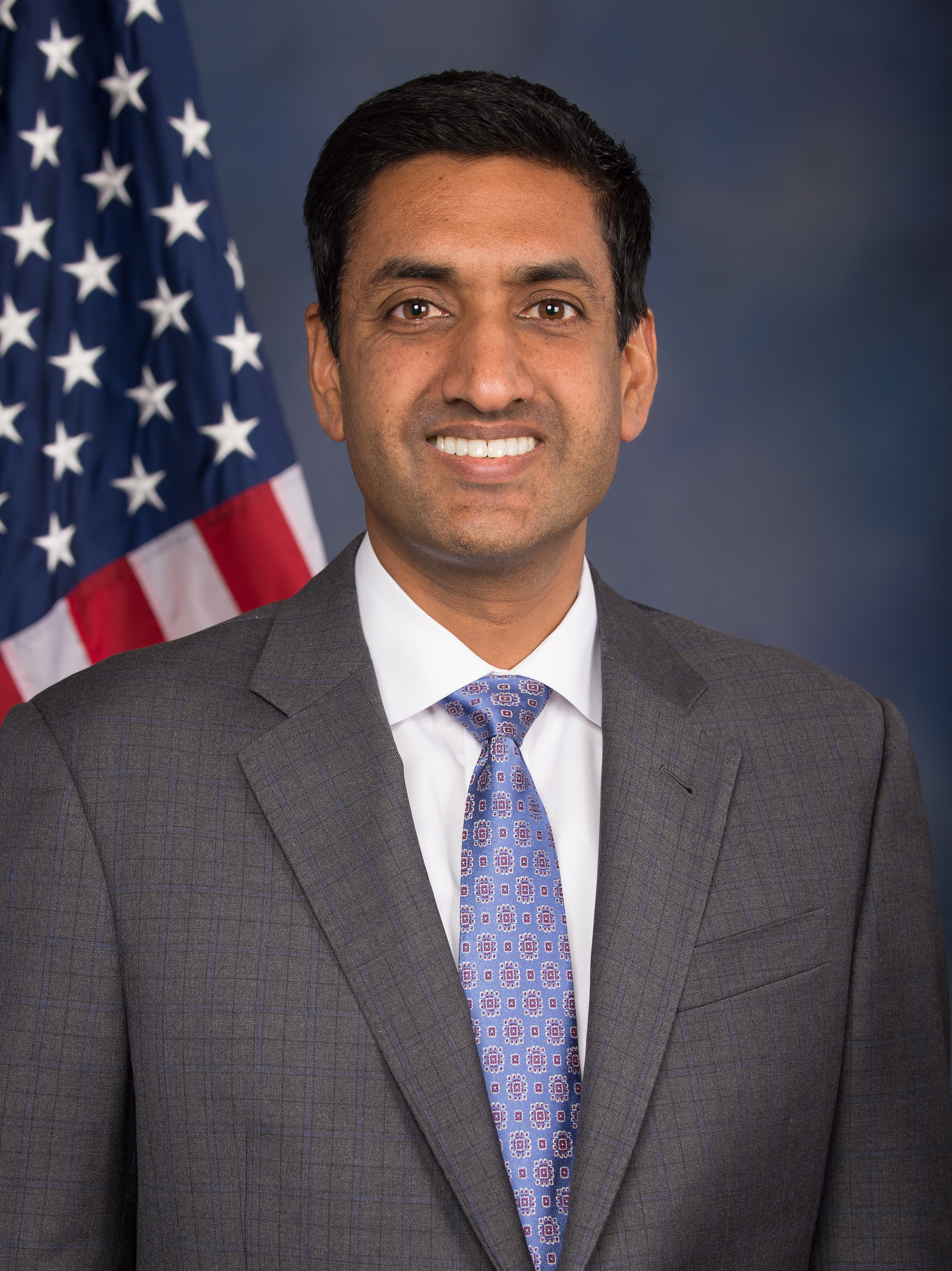

Nominee	Ro Khanna	Ron Cohen
Party	Democratic	Republican
Popular vote	159,105	52,057
Percentage	75.3%	24.7%
- County results Khanna: 70–80%
U.S. Representative before election
Ro Khanna
Democratic
Elected U.S. Representative
Ro Khanna
Democratic

The 17th district is based in the Bay Area and includes Sunnyvale, Cupertino, Santa Clara, Fremont, and Milpitas. Incumbent Democrat Ro Khanna, who had represented the 17th district since 2017, ran for re-election. He was elected with 61.0% of the vote in 2016. The district had a PVI of D+25.

=== Primary election ===
==== Democratic candidates ====
===== Advanced to general =====
- Ro Khanna, incumbent U.S. representative

===== Eliminated in primary =====
- Stephen Forbes, business analyst
- Khanh Tran, Alum Rock school board president

==== Republican candidates ====
===== Advanced to general =====
- Ron Cohen, certified public accountant

==== Libertarian candidates ====
===== Eliminated in primary =====
- Kennita Watson, retired software engineer

==== Results ====
Nonpartisan blanket primary results
Party	Candidate	Votes	%
Democratic	Ro Khanna (incumbent)	72,676	62.0
Republican	Ron Cohen	26,865	22.9
Democratic	Khanh Tran	8,455	7.2
Democratic	Stephen Forbes	6,259	5.3
Libertarian	Kennita Watson	2,997	2.6
Total votes		117,252	100.0

=== General election ===
==== Predictions ====
Source	Ranking	As of
The Cook Political Report	Safe D	November 5, 2018
Inside Elections	Safe D	November 5, 2018
Sabato's Crystal Ball	Safe D	November 5, 2018
RealClearPolitics	Safe D	November 5, 2018
Daily Kos	Safe D	November 5, 2018
538	Safe D	November 7, 2018
CNN	Safe D	October 31, 2018
Politico	Safe D	November 4, 2018

==== Endorsements ====
Ro Khanna (D)

Organizations

- J Street PAC

==== Results ====
California's 17th congressional district election, 2018
Party	Candidate	Votes	%
Democratic	Ro Khanna (incumbent)	159,105	75.3
Republican	Ron Cohen	52,057	24.7
Total votes		211,162	100.0
Democratic hold			

== District 18 ==
2018 California's 18th congressional district election
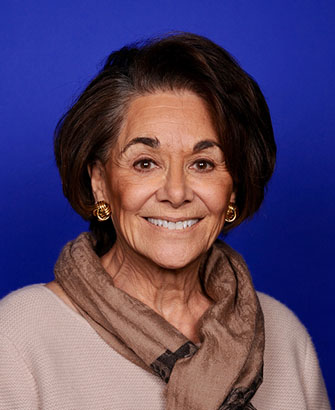

Nominee	Anna Eshoo	Christine Russell
Party	Democratic	Republican
Popular vote	225,142	77,096
Percentage	74.5%	25.5%
- County results G. Eshoo: 70–80%
U.S. Representative before election
Anna Eshoo
Democratic
Elected U.S. Representative
Anna Eshoo
Democratic

The 18th district is based in the Bay Area and includes Palo Alto, Redwood City, and Saratoga. Incumbent Democrat Anna Eshoo, who had represented the 18th district since 2013 and previously represented the 14th district from 1993 to 2013, ran for re-election. She was re-elected with 71.1% of the vote in 2016. The district had a PVI of D+23.

=== Primary election ===
==== Democratic candidates ====
===== Advanced to general =====
- Anna Eshoo, incumbent U.S. representative

==== Republican candidates ====
===== Advanced to general =====
- Christine Russell, technology company director

==== Independent candidates ====
===== Eliminated in primary =====
- John Karl Fredrich, teacher

==== Results ====
Nonpartisan blanket primary results
Party	Candidate	Votes	%
Democratic	Anna Eshoo (incumbent)	133,993	73.4
Republican	Christine Russell	42,692	23.4
No party preference	John Karl Fredrich	5,803	3.2
Total votes		182,488	100.0

=== General election ===
==== Predictions ====
Source	Ranking	As of
The Cook Political Report	Safe D	November 5, 2018
Inside Elections	Safe D	November 5, 2018
Sabato's Crystal Ball	Safe D	November 5, 2018
RealClearPolitics	Safe D	November 5, 2018
Daily Kos	Safe D	November 5, 2018
538	Safe D	November 7, 2018
CNN	Safe D	October 31, 2018
Politico	Safe D	November 4, 2018

==== Endorsements ====
Anna Eshoo (D)

Organizations

- J Street PAC

==== Results ====
California's 18th congressional district election, 2018
Party	Candidate	Votes	%
Democratic	Anna Eshoo (incumbent)	225,142	74.5
Republican	Christine Russell	77,096	25.5
Total votes		302,238	100.0
Democratic hold			

== District 19 ==
2018 California's 19th congressional district election
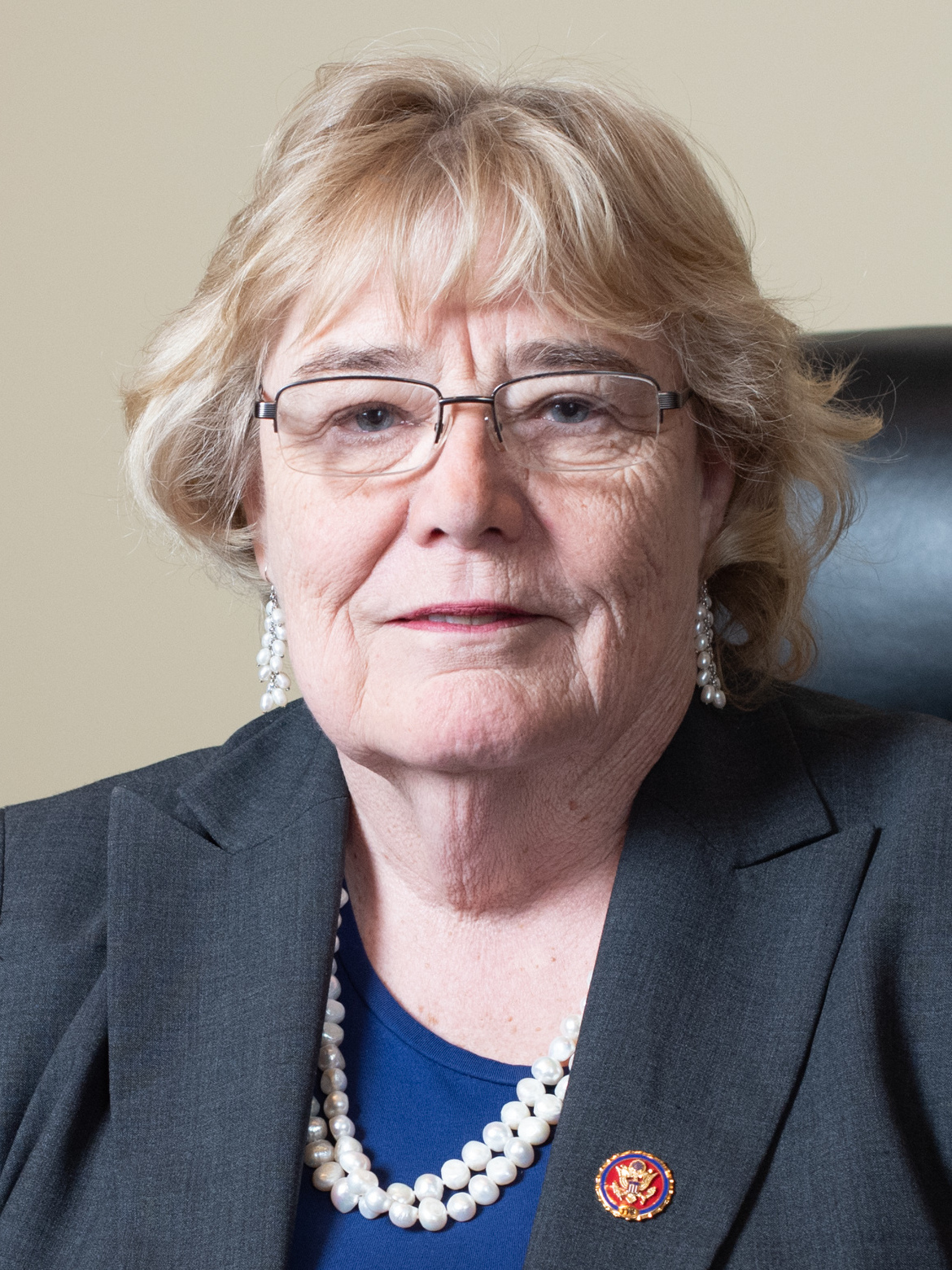

Nominee	Zoe Lofgren	Justin James Aguilera
Party	Democratic	Republican
Popular vote	162,496	57,823
Percentage	73.8%	26.2%
- County results Lofgren: 70–80%
U.S. Representative before election
Zoe Lofgren
Democratic
Elected U.S. Representative
Zoe Lofgren
Democratic

The 19th district is based in the South Bay and includes most of San Jose. Incumbent Democrat Zoe Lofgren, who had represented the 19th district since 2013 and previously represented the 16th district from 1995 to 2013, ran for re-election. She was re-elected with 73.9% of the vote in 2016. The district had a PVI of D+24.

=== Primary election ===
==== Democratic candidates ====
===== Advanced to general =====
- Zoe Lofgren, incumbent U.S. representative

==== Republican candidates ====
===== Advanced to general =====
- Justin James Aguilera

===== Eliminated in primary =====
- Karl Ryan

==== Results ====
Nonpartisan blanket primary results
Party	Candidate	Votes	%
Democratic	Zoe Lofgren (incumbent)	97,096	99.0
Republican	Justin James Aguilera (write-in)	792	0.8
Republican	Karl Ryan (write-in)	160	0.2
American Independent	Robert Ornelas (write-in)	7	0.0
Total votes		98,055	100.0

=== General election ===
==== Predictions ====
Source	Ranking	As of
The Cook Political Report	Safe D	November 5, 2018
Inside Elections	Safe D	November 5, 2018
Sabato's Crystal Ball	Safe D	November 5, 2018
RealClearPolitics	Safe D	November 5, 2018
Daily Kos	Safe D	November 5, 2018
538	Safe D	November 7, 2018
CNN	Safe D	October 31, 2018
Politico	Safe D	November 4, 2018

==== Endorsements ====
Zoe Lofgren (D)

Organizations

- J Street PAC

==== Results ====
California's 19th congressional district election, 2018
Party	Candidate	Votes	%
Democratic	Zoe Lofgren (incumbent)	162,496	73.8
Republican	Justin James Aguilera	57,823	26.2
Total votes		220,319	100.0
Democratic hold			

== District 20 ==
2018 California's 20th congressional district election
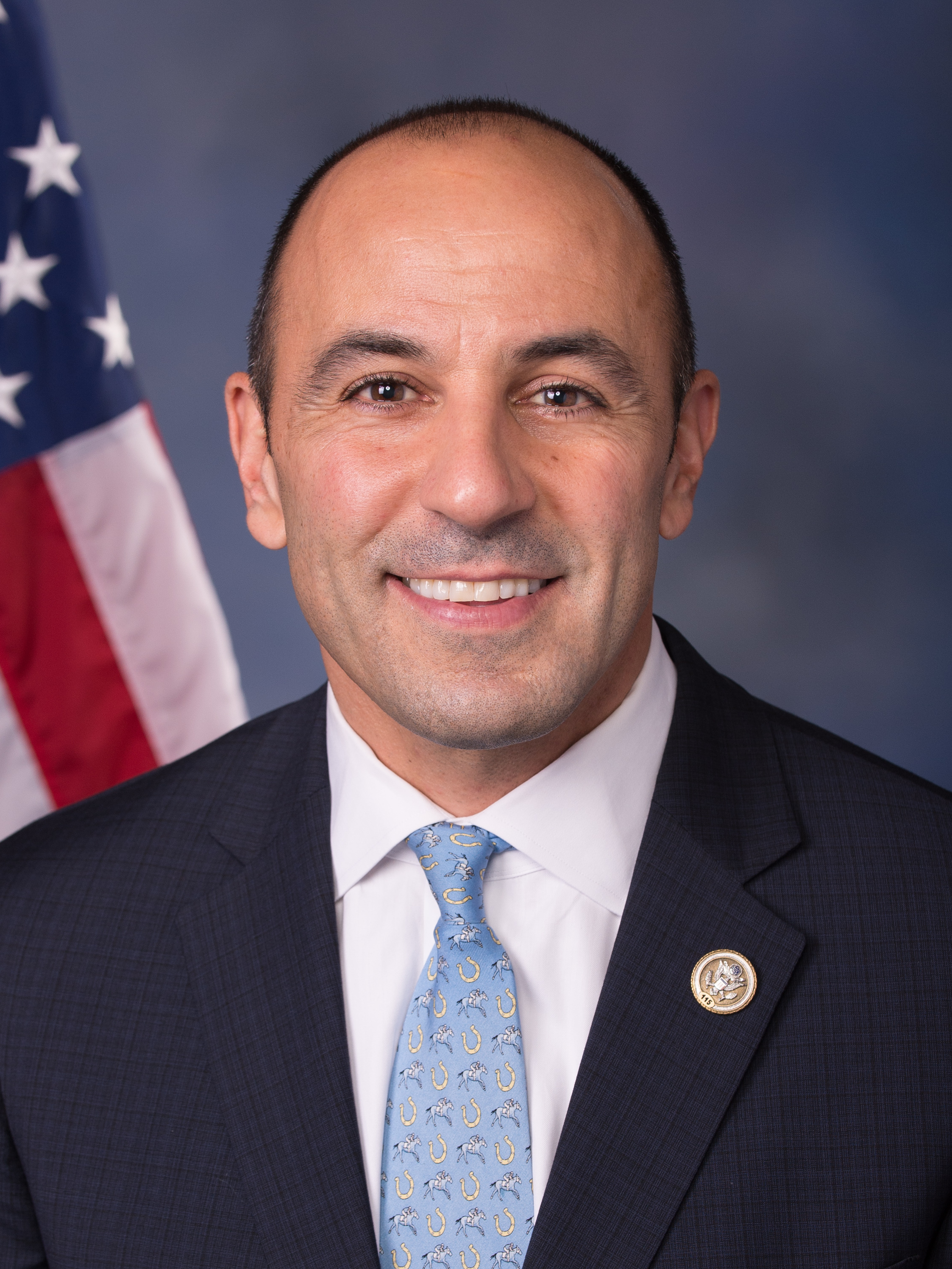

Nominee	Jimmy Panetta	Ronald Paul Kabat
Party	Democratic	No party preference
Popular vote	183,677	42,044
Percentage	81.4%	18.6%
- County results Panetta: 70–80% 80–90%
U.S. Representative before election
Jimmy Panetta
Democratic
Elected U.S. Representative
Jimmy Panetta
Democratic

The 20th district is based in the Central Coast and includes Monterey and Santa Cruz. Incumbent Democrat Jimmy Panetta, who had represented the 20th district since 2017, ran for re-election. He was elected with 70.8% of the vote in 2016. The district had a PVI of D+23.

=== Primary election ===
==== Democratic candidates ====
===== Advanced to general =====
- Jimmy Panetta, incumbent U.S. representative

===== Eliminated in primary =====
- Douglas Deitch, nonprofit executive director

==== Republican candidates ====
===== Eliminated in primary =====
- Casey Clark

==== Independent candidates ====
===== Advanced to general =====
- Ronald Paul Kabat, certified public accountant

===== Withdrawn =====
- Robert Neil Cheader

==== Results ====
Nonpartisan blanket primary results
Party	Candidate	Votes	%
Democratic	Jimmy Panetta (incumbent)	102,828	80.7
No party preference	Ronald Paul Kabat	19,657	15.4
Democratic	Douglas Deitch	4,956	3.9
Republican	Casey K. Clark (write-in)	20	0.0
Total votes		127,461	100.0

=== General election ===
==== Predictions ====
Source	Ranking	As of
The Cook Political Report	Safe D	November 5, 2018
Inside Elections	Safe D	November 5, 2018
Sabato's Crystal Ball	Safe D	November 5, 2018
RealClearPolitics	Safe D	November 5, 2018
Daily Kos	Safe D	November 5, 2018
538	Safe D	November 7, 2018
CNN	Safe D	October 31, 2018
Politico	Safe D	November 4, 2018

==== Results ====
California's 20th congressional district election, 2018
Party	Candidate	Votes	%
Democratic	Jimmy Panetta (incumbent)	183,677	81.4
No party preference	Ronald Paul Kabat	42,044	18.6
Total votes		225,721	100.0
Democratic hold			

== District 21 ==
2018 California's 21st congressional district election
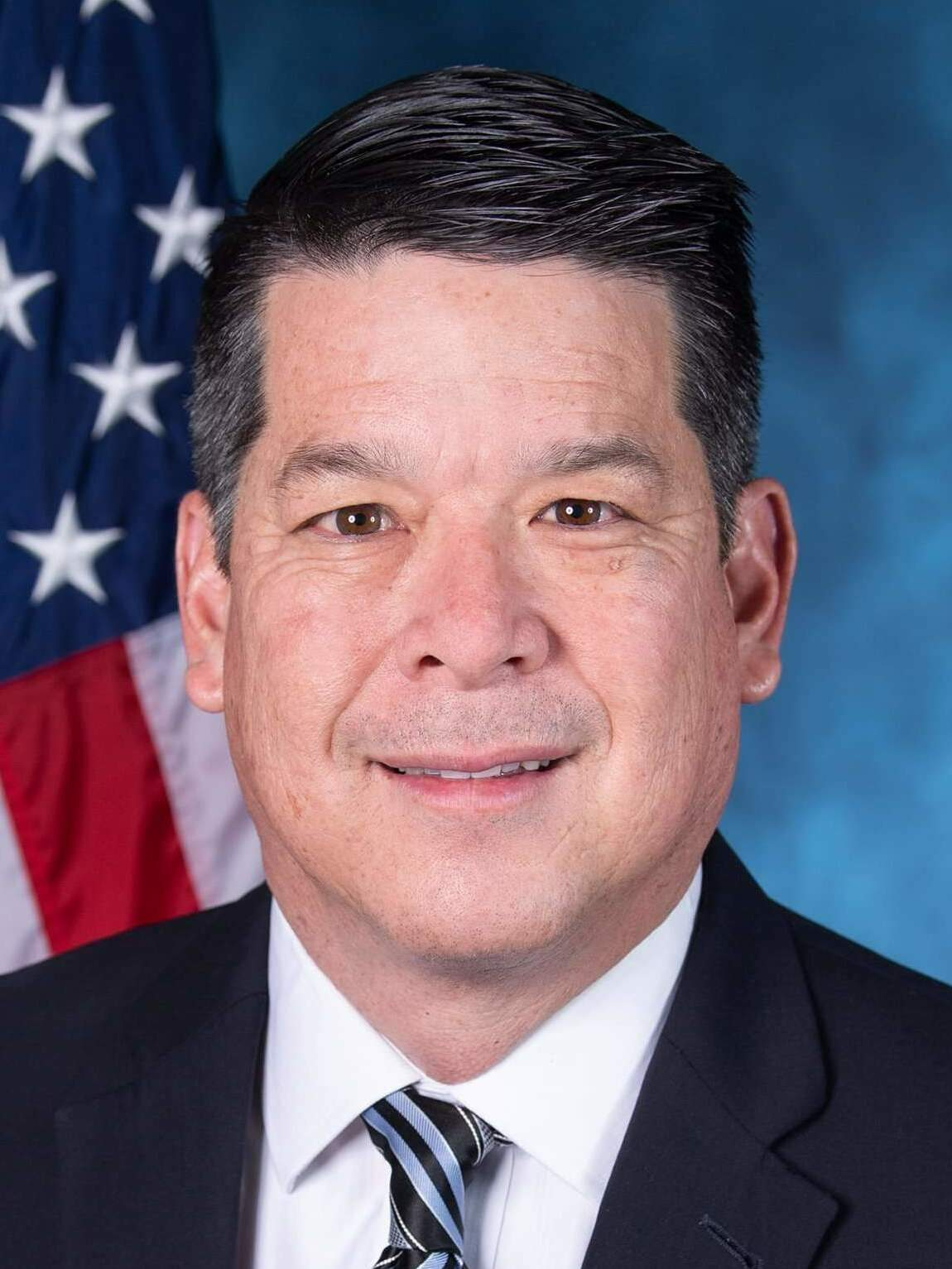

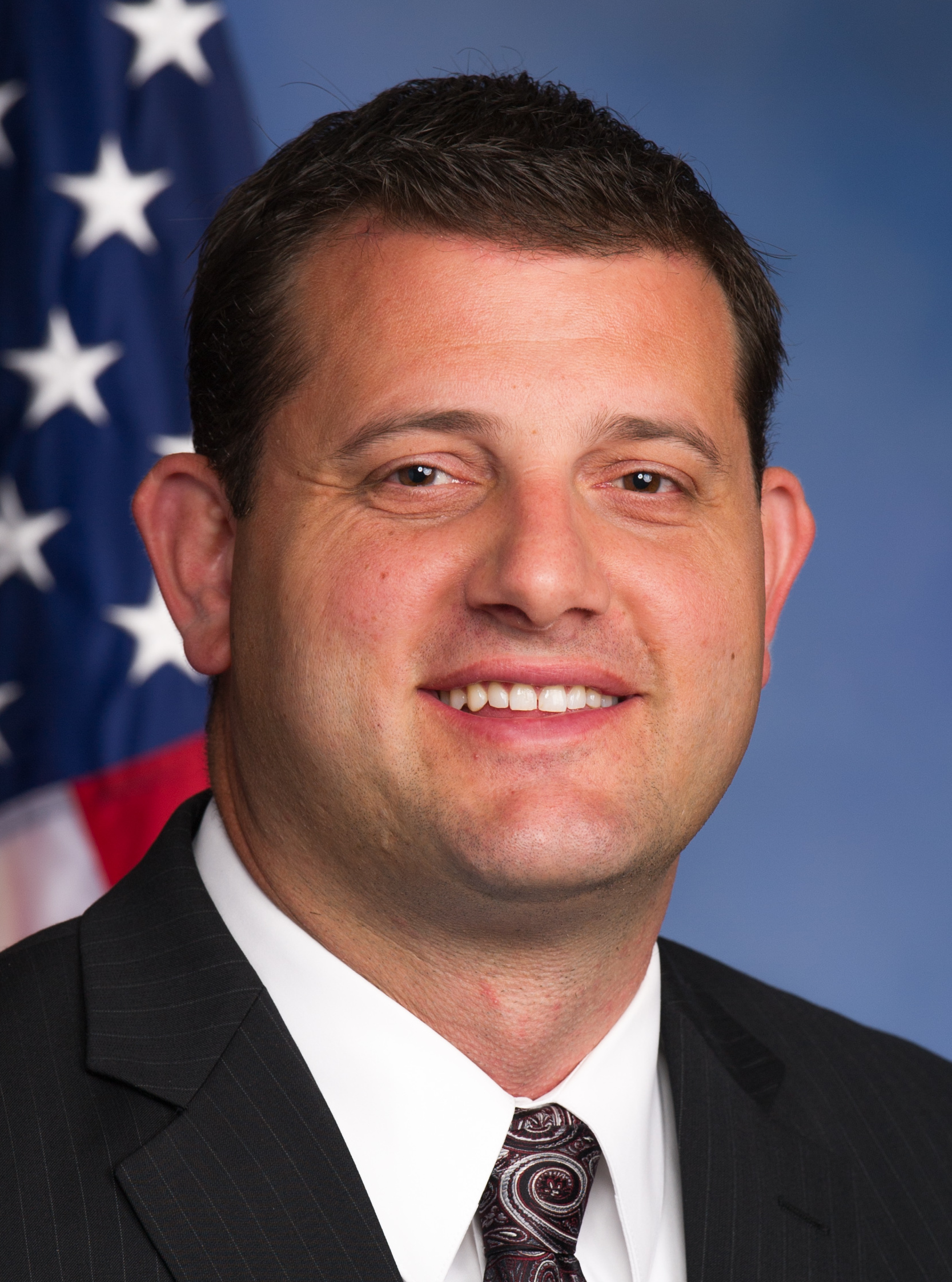
Nominee	TJ Cox	David Valadao
Party	Democratic	Republican
Popular vote	57,239	56,377
Percentage	50.4%	49.6%
- County results Cox: 60–70% Valadao: 50–60% 60–70%
U.S. Representative before election
David Valadao
Republican
Elected U.S. Representative
TJ Cox
Democratic

The 21st district is based in the Central Valley and includes Hanford and parts of Bakersfield. Incumbent Republican David Valadao, who had represented the 21st district since 2013, ran for re-election. He was re-elected with 56.7% of the vote in 2016. The district had a PVI of D+5.

=== Primary election ===
==== Republican candidates ====
===== Advanced to general =====
- David Valadao, incumbent U.S. representative

==== Democratic candidates ====
California's 21st district was included on the list of Republican-held seats being targeted by the Democratic Congressional Campaign Committee in 2018.

===== Advanced to general =====
- TJ Cox, engineer and small businessman

===== Withdrawn =====
- Emilio Huerta, civil rights attorney and general election candidate for this seat in 2016

Cox was running in the 10th district race before switching to run in the 21st district in March 2017. Democrat Emilio Huerta, who ran for the seat in 2016 and was planning to run again, dropped out shortly before Cox entered the race.

==== Results ====
Results by county: Valadao—70–80% Valadao—60–70% Valadao—50–60%

Nonpartisan blanket primary results
Party	Candidate	Votes	%
Republican	David Valadao (incumbent)	34,290	62.8
Democratic	TJ Cox	20,293	37.2
Total votes		54,583	100.0

=== General election ===
==== Endorsements ====
David Valadao (R)

Organizations

- National Republican Congressional Committee "Patriot" Program
TJ Cox (D)

U.S. executive branch officials

- Barack Obama, 44th president of the United States

U.S. senators

- Dianne Feinstein, U.S. senator from California
- Kamala Harris, U.S. senator from California

U.S. representatives

- Ted Lieu (D-CA-33)

State officials

- Gavin Newsom, lieutenant governor of California and nominee for governor in 2018

Labor unions

- California Labor Federation
- Service Employees International Union

Organizations

- 314 Action
- Democratic Congressional Campaign Committee "Red to Blue" Program
- Equality California
- J Street PAC
- League of Conservation Voters
- Planned Parenthood Action Fund

==== Polling ====
Poll source	Date(s) administered	Sample size	Margin of error	David Valadao (R)	TJ Cox (D)	Undecided
SurveyUSA	September 20–24, 2018	555	± 5.4%	50%	39%	11%

==== Predictions ====
Source	Ranking	As of
The Cook Political Report	Likely R	November 5, 2018
Inside Elections	Likely R	November 5, 2018
Sabato's Crystal Ball	Lean R	November 5, 2018
RCP	Likely R	November 5, 2018
Daily Kos	Likely R	November 5, 2018
538	Likely R	November 7, 2018
CNN	Likely R	October 31, 2018
Politico	Lean R	November 4, 2018

==== Debate ====
2018 California's 21st congressional district debate
No.	Date	Host	Moderator	Link	Republican	Democratic
Key: P Participant A Absent N Not invited I Invited W Withdrawn						
Key: P Participant A Absent N Not invited I Invited W Withdrawn					David Valadao	TJ Cox
1	, 2018	KSEE-TV; KGET-TV	Evan Onstot; Jim Scott		P	P

==== Results ====
On election night, Valadao held an 8-point lead, the Associated Press and other news networks called the race for Valadao, and Cox conceded. However, mail-in and absentee ballots, which constituted about sixty percent of all ballots cast in the race, started arriving in the days and weeks following election day and swung heavily toward Cox. On November 26, Cox took the lead, retaining it until all ballots had been counted; Valadao conceded the race on December 6.

California's 21st congressional district election, 2018
Party	Candidate	Votes	%
Democratic	TJ Cox	57,239	50.4
Republican	David Valadao (incumbent)	56,377	49.6
Majority		862	0.8
Total votes		113,616	100.0
Democratic gain from Republican			

== District 22 ==
2018 California's 22nd congressional district election
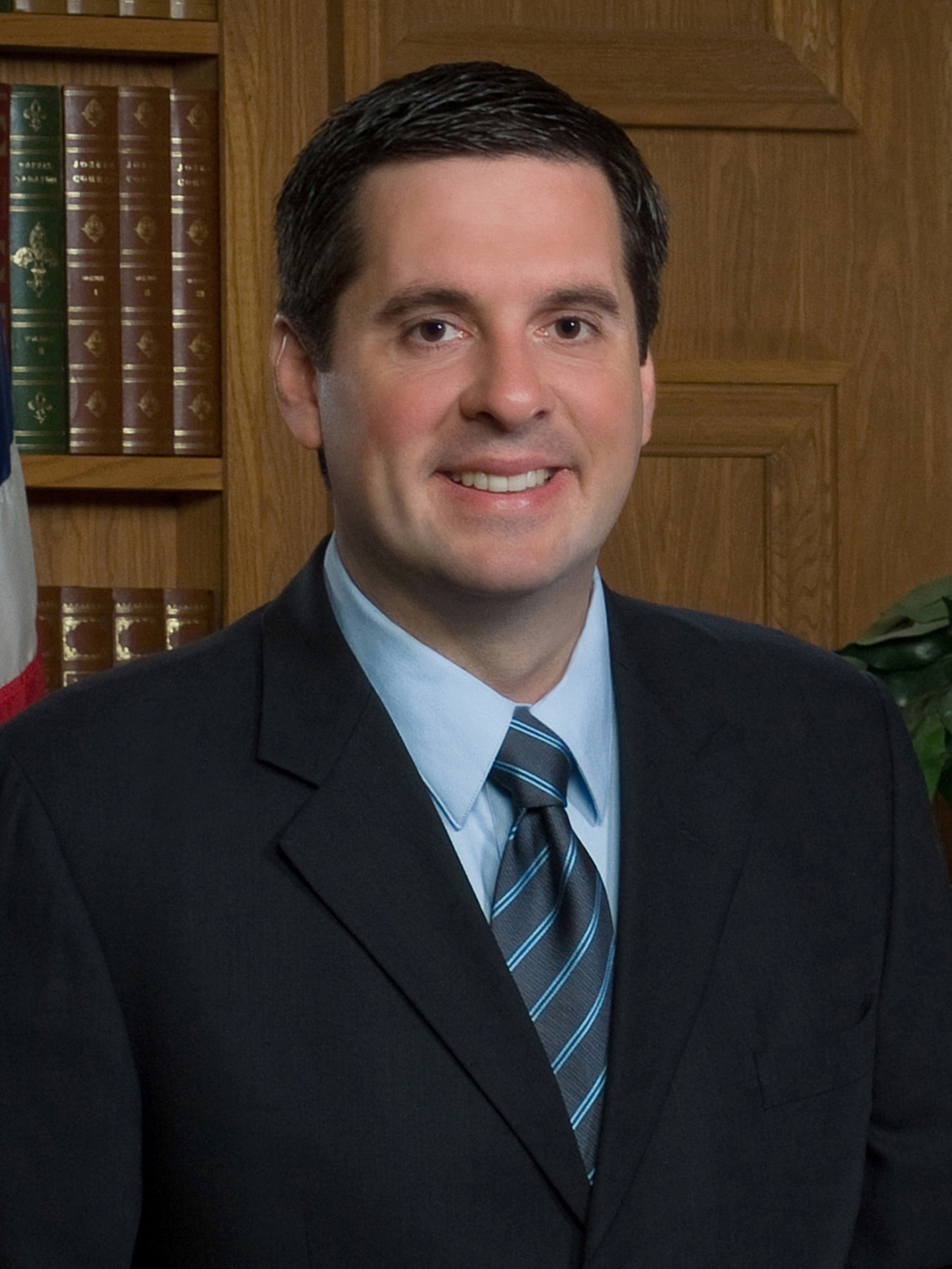

Nominee	Devin Nunes	Andrew Janz
Party	Republican	Democratic
Popular vote	117,243	105,136
Percentage	52.8%	47.2%
- County results Nunes: 50–60%
U.S. Representative before election
Devin Nunes
Republican
Elected U.S. Representative
Devin Nunes
Republican

The 22nd district is based in the Central Valley and includes Clovis, Tulare, and Visalia. Incumbent Republican Devin Nunes, who had represented the 22nd district since 2013 and previously represented the 21st district from 2003 to 2013, ran for re-election. He was re-elected with 67.6% of the vote in 2016. The district had a PVI of R+8.

=== Primary election ===
In 2017, Nunes received criticism for his handling of the investigation into Russian interference in the 2016 United States elections.

==== Republican candidates ====
===== Advanced to general =====
- Devin Nunes, incumbent U.S. representative

==== Democratic candidates ====
California's 22nd district was included on the list of Republican-held seats being targeted by the Democratic Congressional Campaign Committee in 2018.

===== Advanced to general =====
- Andrew Janz, Fresno County deputy district attorney

===== Eliminated in primary =====
- Bobby Bliatout, nonprofit healthcare executive
- Ricardo "Rico" Franco, technology consultant

===== Withdrawn =====
- Mallory Kremer, obstetrician-gynecologist physician
- Jose Sigala, Tulare City Council member
- Paul Vargas

==== Libertarian candidates ====
===== Eliminated in primary =====
- Bill Merryman, human resources analyst

==== Independent candidates ====
===== Eliminated in primary =====
- Brian Carroll, teacher

==== Endorsements ====
Brian T. Carroll (ASP)

Organizations

- American Solidarity Party of California
Ricardo "Rico" Franco (D)

Local officials

- Gayle McLaughlin (Independent), former mayor of Richmond

==== Results ====
Nonpartisan blanket primary results
Party	Candidate	Votes	%
Republican	Devin Nunes (incumbent)	70,112	57.6
Democratic	Andrew Janz	38,596	31.7
Democratic	Bobby Bliatout	6,002	4.9
Democratic	Ricardo "Rico" Franco	4,365	3.6
No party preference	Brian Carroll	1,591	1.3
Libertarian	Bill Merryman	1,137	0.9
Total votes		121,803	100.0

=== General election ===
==== Endorsements ====
Devin Nunes (R)

U.S. executive branch officials

- Donald Trump, 45th president of the United States
Andrew Janz (D)

Newspapers

- The Fresno Bee

==== Polling ====
Poll source	Date(s) administered	Sample size	Margin of error	Devin Nunes (R)	Andrew Janz (D)	Undecided
Change Research (D)	October 19–21, 2018	840	–	51%	46%	3%
SurveyUSA	September 20–25, 2018	582	± 5.7%	55%	41%	4%
UC Berkeley	September 16–23, 2018	912	± 4.0%	53%	45%	2%
Strategies 360 (D-Janz)	September 10–13, 2018	402	± 4.9%	50%	44%	6%
Tulchin Research (D-Janz)	July 22–25, 2018	400	± 4.9%	48%	43%	9%
Strategies 360 (D-Janz)	July 12–17, 2018	500	± 4.4%	53%	41%	16%
Public Policy Polling (D)	June 22–24, 2018	632	± 3.9%	49%	41%	10%

==== Predictions ====
Source	Ranking	As of
The Cook Political Report	Likely R	November 5, 2018
Inside Elections	Safe R	November 5, 2018
Sabato's Crystal Ball	Likely R	November 5, 2018
RCP	Likely R	November 5, 2018
Daily Kos	Likely R	November 5, 2018
538	Safe R	November 7, 2018
CNN	Safe R	October 31, 2018
Politico	Likely R	November 4, 2018

==== Results ====
California's 22nd congressional district election, 2018
Party	Candidate	Votes	%
Republican	Devin Nunes (incumbent)	117,243	52.8
Democratic	Andrew Janz	105,136	47.2
Majority		12,107	5.6
Total votes		222,379	100.0
Republican hold			

== District 23 ==
2018 California's 23rd congressional district election
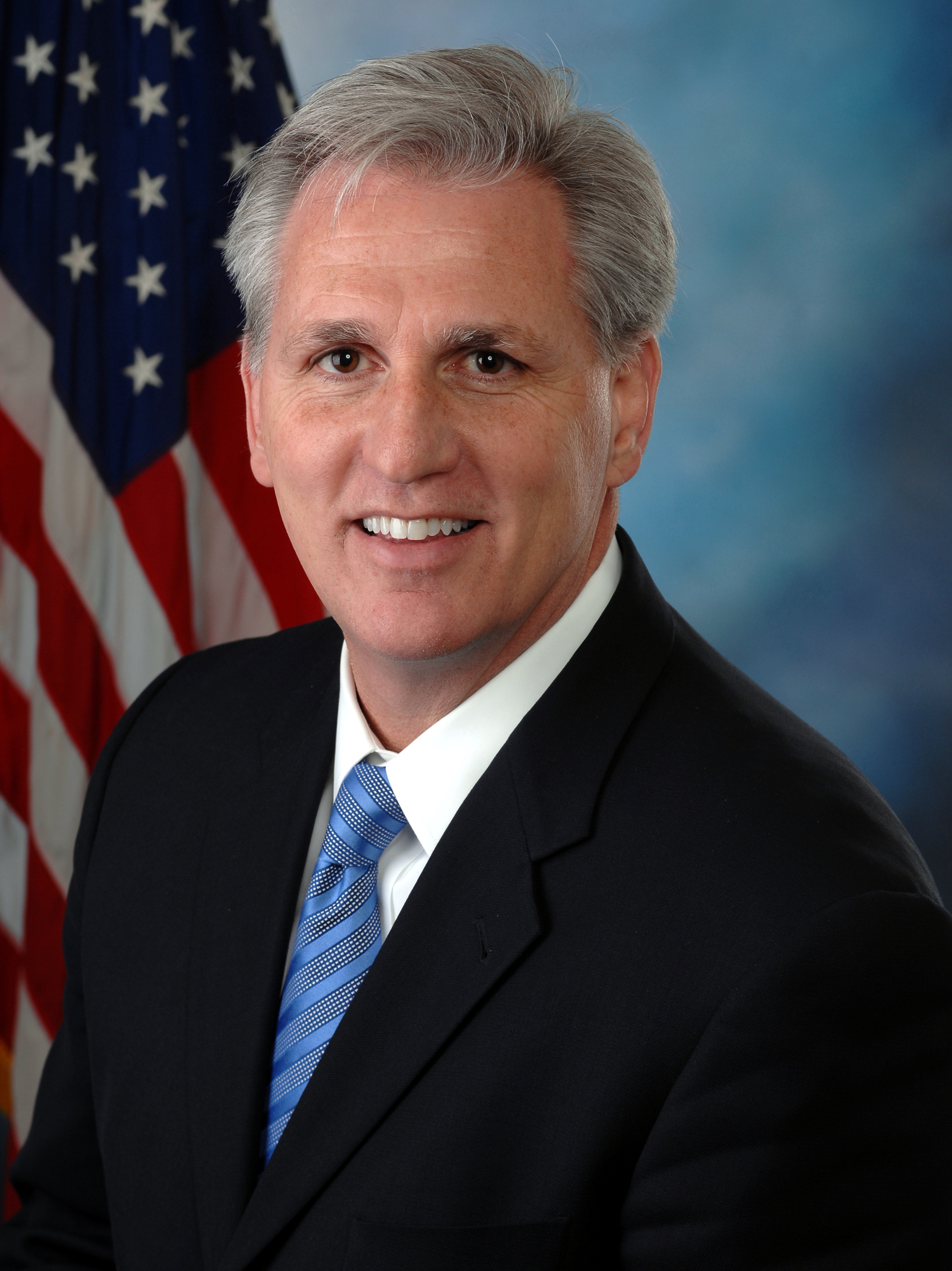

Nominee	Kevin McCarthy	Tatiana Matta
Party	Republican	Democratic
Popular vote	131,113	74,661
Percentage	63.7%	36.3%
- County results Mccarthy: 50–60% 60–70%
U.S. Representative before election
Kevin McCarthy
Republican
Elected U.S. Representative
Kevin McCarthy
Republican

The 23rd district is based in the southern Central Valley and includes parts of Bakersfield. Republican House Majority Leader Kevin McCarthy, who had represented the 23rd district since 2013 and previously represented the 22nd district from 2007 to 2013, ran for re-election. He was re-elected with 69.2% of the vote in 2016. The district had a PVI of R+14.

=== Primary election ===
==== Republican candidates ====
===== Advanced to general =====
- Kevin McCarthy, incumbent U.S. representative

===== Withdrawn =====
- Joe Aleman

==== Democratic candidates ====
===== Advanced to general =====
- Tatiana Matta, public relations professional

===== Eliminated in primary =====
- Mary Helen Barro, businesswoman and educator
- Wendy Reed, businesswoman, community advocate and general election candidate for this seat in 2016
- Kurtis Wilson, realtor and motivational speaker

===== Withdrawn =====
- Robert Owen, former Tulare County Prosecutor and U.S. Marine

==== Independent candidates ====
===== Eliminated in primary =====
- James Davis

==== Results ====
Nonpartisan blanket primary results
Party	Candidate	Votes	%
Republican	Kevin McCarthy (incumbent)	81,633	68.8
Democratic	Tatiana Matta	14,935	12.6
Democratic	Wendy Reed	11,974	10.1
Democratic	Mary Helen Barro	6,363	5.4
No party preference	James Davis	2,076	1.7
Democratic	Kurtis Wilson	1,691	1.4
Total votes		118,672	100.0

=== General election ===
==== Predictions ====
Source	Ranking	As of
The Cook Political Report	Safe R	November 5, 2018
Inside Elections	Safe R	November 5, 2018
Sabato's Crystal Ball	Safe R	November 5, 2018
RealClearPolitics	Safe R	November 5, 2018
Daily Kos	Safe R	November 5, 2018
538	Safe R	November 7, 2018
CNN	Safe R	October 31, 2018
Politico	Safe R	November 4, 2018

==== Debate ====
2018 California's 23rd congressional district debate
No.	Date	Host	Moderator	Link	Republican	Democratic
Key: P Participant A Absent N Not invited I Invited W Withdrawn						
Key: P Participant A Absent N Not invited I Invited W Withdrawn					Kevin McCarthy	Tatiana Matta
1	Oct. 18, 2018	KGET-TV	Tami Mlcoch; Jim Scott		P	P

==== Results ====
California's 23rd congressional district election, 2018
Party	Candidate	Votes	%
Republican	Kevin McCarthy (incumbent)	131,113	63.7
Democratic	Tatiana Matta	74,661	36.3
Total votes		205,774	100.0
Republican hold			

== District 24 ==
2018 California's 24th congressional district election
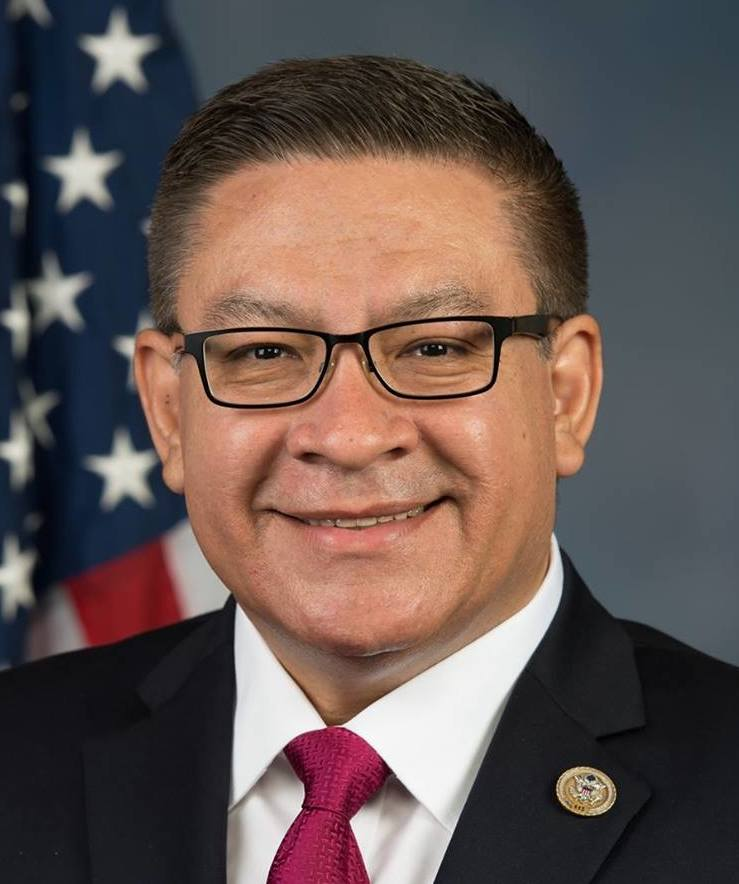

Nominee	Salud Carbajal	Justin Fareed
Party	Democratic	Republican
Popular vote	166,550	117,881
Percentage	58.6%	41.4%
- County results Carbajal: 50–60% 60–70%
U.S. Representative before election
Salud Carbajal
Democratic
Elected U.S. Representative
Salud Carbajal
Democratic

The 24th district is based in the Central Coast and includes San Luis Obispo and Santa Barbara counties. Incumbent Democrat Salud Carbajal, who had represented the 24th district since 2017, ran for re-election. He was elected with 53.4% of the vote in 2016. The district had a PVI of D+7.

=== Primary election ===
==== Democratic candidates ====
===== Advanced to general =====
- Salud Carbajal, incumbent U.S. representative

==== Republican candidates ====
California's 24th district was included on the list of Democratic-held seats being targeted by the National Republican Congressional Committee in 2018.

===== Advanced to general =====
- Justin Fareed, cattle rancher

===== Eliminated in primary =====
- Michael Erin Woody, civil engineer and former Fresno City Council member

==== Results ====
Nonpartisan blanket primary results
Party	Candidate	Votes	%
Democratic	Salud Carbajal (incumbent)	94,558	53.6
Republican	Justin Fareed	64,177	36.4
Republican	Michael Erin Woody	17,715	10.0
Total votes		176,450	100.0

=== General election ===
==== Endorsements ====
Salud Carbajal (D)

Organizations

- Democratic Congressional Campaign Committee "Frontline" Program
- J Street PAC
Justin Fareed (R)

Organizations

- California Cattlemen's Association
- National Border Patrol Council
- National Republican Congressional Committee "Young Guns" Program

Local officials

- Ian Parkinson, San Luis Obispo County sheriff

==== Polling ====
Poll source	Date(s) administered	Sample size	Margin of error	Salud Carbajal (D)	Justin Fareed (R)	Undecided
Olive Tree Strategies (R-Fareed)	July 12–15, 2018	404	± 4.9%	47%	46%	7%

==== Predictions ====
Source	Ranking	As of
The Cook Political Report	Safe D	November 5, 2018
Inside Elections	Safe D	November 5, 2018
Sabato's Crystal Ball	Likely D	November 5, 2018
RCP	Likely D	November 5, 2018
Daily Kos	Safe D	November 5, 2018
538	Safe D	November 7, 2018
CNN	Safe D	October 31, 2018
Politico	Likely D	November 4, 2018

==== Results ====
California's 24th congressional district election, 2018
Party	Candidate	Votes	%
Democratic	Salud Carbajal (incumbent)	166,550	58.6
Republican	Justin Fareed	117,881	41.4
Majority		48,669	17.2
Total votes		284,431	100.0
Democratic hold			

== District 25 ==
2018 California's 25th congressional district election
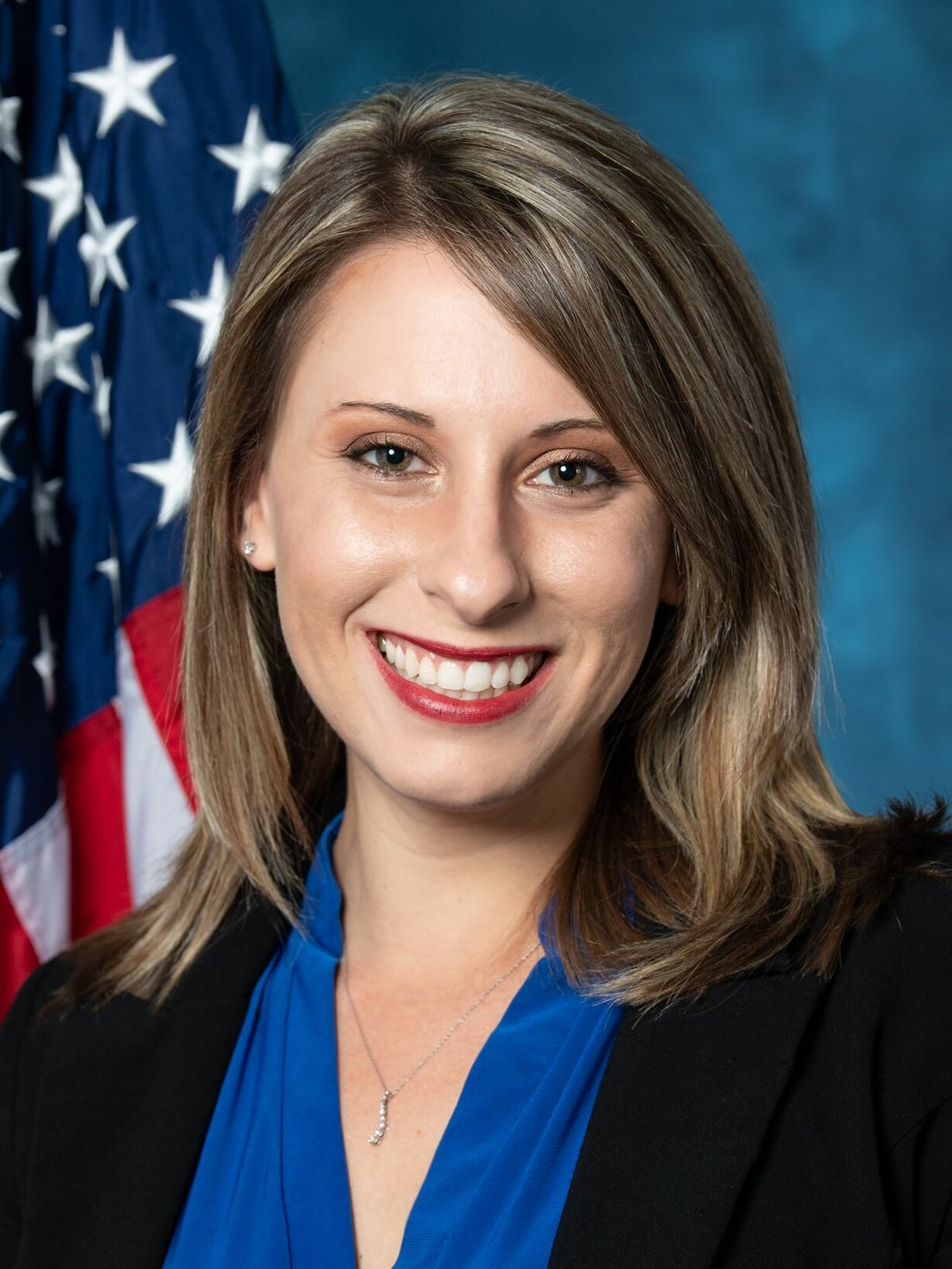

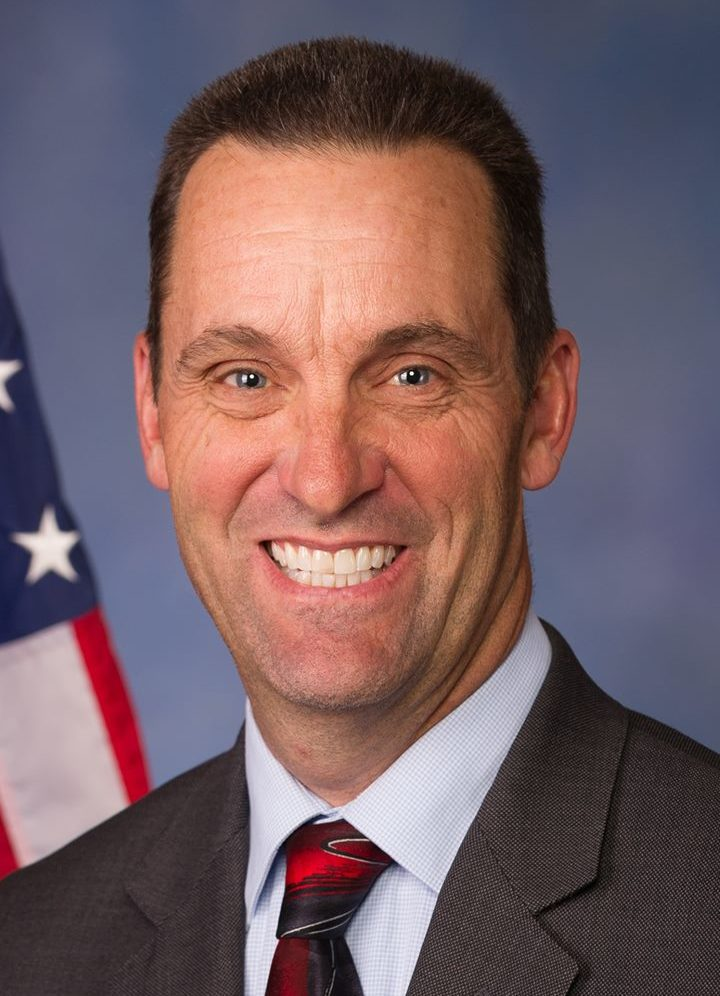
Nominee	Katie Hill	Steve Knight
Party	Democratic	Republican
Popular vote	133,209	111,813
Percentage	54.4%	45.6%
- County results Hill: 50–60% Knight: 50–60%
U.S. Representative before election
Steve Knight
Republican
Elected U.S. Representative
Katie Hill
Democratic

The 25th district is based in northern Los Angeles County and includes Palmdale and Santa Clarita as well as Simi Valley in Ventura County. Incumbent Republican Steve Knight, who had represented the 25th district since 2015, ran for re-election. He was re-elected with 53.1% of the vote in 2016. The district had a PVI of EVEN.

=== Primary election ===
==== Republican candidates ====
===== Advanced to general =====
- Steve Knight, incumbent U.S. representative

==== Democratic candidates ====
California's 25th district was included on the list of Republican-held seats being targeted by the Democratic Congressional Campaign Committee in 2018.

===== Advanced to general =====
- Katie Hill, executive director and deputy CEO of People Assisting the Homeless

===== Eliminated in primary =====
- Bryan Caforio, attorney and general election candidate for this seat in 2016
- Mary Pallant, small businesswoman and former Oak Park School Board member
- Jess Phoenix, volcanologist and nonprofit director

===== Withdrawn =====
- Kelan Farrell Smith
- Daniel Fleming
- Diedra Greenaway, former budget advocate for the City of Los Angeles
- Michael Masterman-Smith, cancer biologist
- Scott McVarish, immigration attorney

===== Declined =====
- Christy Smith, Newhall School District president and general election candidate for State Assembly in 2016

==== Endorsements ====
Bryan Caforio (D)

State officials

- Gavin Newsom, lieutenant governor of California and nominee for governor in 2018

Labor unions

- Amalgamated Transit Union
- American Postal Workers Union
- Communications Workers of America
- International Association of Bridge, Structural, Ornamental and Reinforcing Iron Workers
- International Association of Machinists and Aerospace Workers
- International Association of Sheet Metal, Air, Rail and Transportation Workers
- International Brotherhood of Electrical Workers
- International Brotherhood of Teamsters
- International Longshore and Warehouse Union
- International Union of Operating Engineers
- International Union of Painters and Allied Trades
- Laborers' International Union of North America
- National Association of Letter Carriers
- National Nurses United
- United Steelworkers
- Utility Workers Union of America

Organizations

- Democracy for America
- Justice Democrats
Katie Hill (D)

Labor unions

- American Nurses Association

Organizations

- EMILY's List
- Equality California
- LGBTQ Victory Fund
- NARAL Pro-Choice America
- Stonewall Democrats
Jess Phoenix (D)

U.S. representatives

- Jerry McNerney, U.S. representative (D-CA-9)

Organizations

- Our Revolution

Local officials

- Gayle McLaughlin (Independent), former mayor of Richmond

Individuals

- John Billingsley, actor, reader, activist
- Felicia Day, actress, writer, singer
- Gates McFadden, actress, director
- Patton Oswalt, comedian, actor, voice actor, and writer
- Piper Perabo, film and television actress
- Robert Picardo, actor, Planetary Society board member, and host of The Planetary Post
- Marina Sirtis, actress
- Tara Strong, voice actress
- Wil Wheaton, actor, blogger, voice actor and writer

==== Polling ====
Poll source	Date(s) administered	Sample size	Margin of error	Bryan Caforio (D)	Steve Knight (R)	Katie Hill (D)	Jess Phoenix (D)	Other	Undecided
ALG Research (D-Caforio)	February 11–15, 2018	500	± 4.4%	19%	43%	10%	7%	5%	7%
Public Policy Polling (D-Caforio)	May 16–17, 2017	596	± 4.0%	30%	46%	9%	4%	–	10%

==== Results ====
Results by county: Knight—50–60%

Nonpartisan blanket primary results
Party	Candidate	Votes	%
Republican	Steve Knight (incumbent)	61,411	51.8
Democratic	Katie Hill	24,507	20.7
Democratic	Bryan Caforio	21,821	18.4
Democratic	Jess Phoenix	7,549	6.4
Democratic	Mary Pallant	3,157	2.7
Total votes		118,445	100.0

=== General election ===
==== Endorsements ====
Steve Knight (R)

Organizations

- National Republican Congressional Committee "Patriot" Program
Katie Hill (D)

U.S. executive branch officials

- Barack Obama, 44th president of the United States

U.S. senators

- Kamala Harris, U.S. senator from California
- Elizabeth Warren, U.S. senator from Massachusetts

State officials

- Gavin Newsom, lieutenant governor of California and nominee for governor in 2018

Labor unions

- Service Employees International Union

Organizations

- CalArts
- Congressional Progressive Caucus
- Democratic Congressional Campaign Committee "Red to Blue" Program
- EMILY's List
- Equality California
- J Street
- League of Conservation Voters
- LGBTQ Victory Fund
- NARAL Pro-Choice America
- National Committee to Preserve Social Security and Medicare
- Planned Parenthood Action Fund
- Sierra Club
- Stonewall Democrats

Individuals

- Alex Hirsch, animator
- Kirsten Lepore, animator

==== Polling ====
Poll source	Date(s) administered	Sample size	Margin of error	Steve Knight (R)	Katie Hill (D)	Undecided
NYT Upshot/Siena College	October 25–28, 2018	504	± 4.8%	48%	44%	8%
UC Berkeley	September 16–23, 2018	650	± 5.0%	46%	50%	4%
NYT Upshot/Siena College	September 17–19, 2018	500	± 5.0%	47%	45%	7%
IMGE Insights (R)	July 9–12, 2018	400	–	47%	47%	6%
Global Strategy Group	June 11–21, 2018	400	± 4.9%	45%	40%	15%
Public Policy Polling (D)	February 14–15, 2018	283	± 5.8%	40%	50%	10%
FM3 Research	January 24–28, 2018	650	± 3.8%	40%	53%	7%
Strategies 360 (D-Hill)	June 22–25, 2017	401	± 4.9%	49%	42%	9%

Hypothetical polling

with Caforio

Poll source	Date(s) administered	Sample size	Margin of error	Steve Knight (R)	Bryan Caforio (D)	Undecided
FM3 Research	January 24–28, 2018	650	± 3.8%	47%	48%	5%
Strategies 360 (D-Hill)	June 22–25, 2017	401	± 4.9%	48%	43%	9%
PPP(D-Caforio)	May 16–17, 2017	596	± 4.0%	47%	43%	10%

with generic Republican and generic Democrat

Poll source	Date(s) administered	Sample size	Margin of error	Generic Republican	Generic Democrat	Undecided
FM3 Research	January 24–28, 2018	650	± 3.8%	39%	49%	12%

with Knight and generic Democrat

Poll source	Date(s) administered	Sample size	Margin of error	Steve Knight (R)	Generic Democrat (D)	Undecided
PPP/Patriot Majority USA	February 12–13, 2018	703	± 3.7%	42%	44%	14%
PPP/Patriot Majority USA	November 8–9, 2017	576	± 4.1%	38%	50%	12%

==== Predictions ====
Source	Ranking	As of
The Cook Political Report	Tossup	November 5, 2018
Inside Elections	Tossup	November 5, 2018
Sabato's Crystal Ball	Lean R	November 5, 2018
RCP	Tossup	November 5, 2018
Daily Kos	Tossup	November 5, 2018
538	Lean D (flip)	November 7, 2018
CNN	Tossup	October 31, 2018
Politico	Lean D (flip)	November 4, 2018

==== Results ====
California's 25th congressional district election, 2018
Party	Candidate	Votes	%
Democratic	Katie Hill	133,209	54.4
Republican	Steve Knight (incumbent)	111,813	45.6
Majority		21,396	8.8
Total votes		245,022	100.0
Democratic gain from Republican			

General election results by county

Blue represents counties won by Hill. Red represents counties won by Knight.

General election results by county
County	Hill (D)		Knight (R)		Total
County	Votes	%	Votes	%	Votes
Los Angeles	108,355	55.6%	86,562	44.4%	194,917
Ventura	24,854	49.6%	25,251	50.4%	50,105
Totals	133,209	54.4%	111,813	45.6%	245,022

== District 26 ==
2018 California's 26th congressional district election
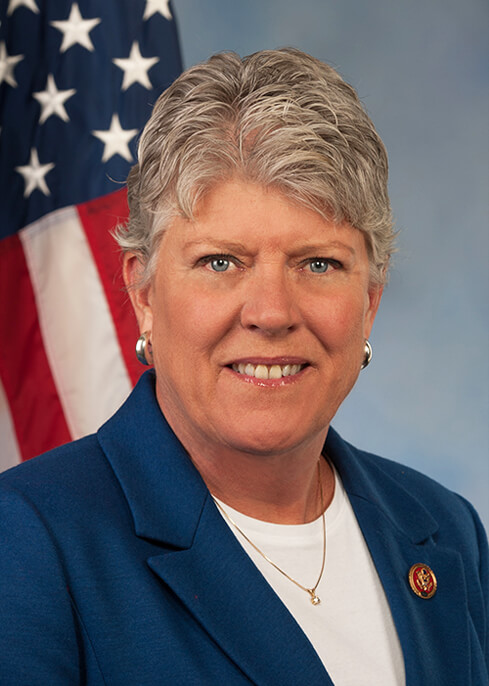

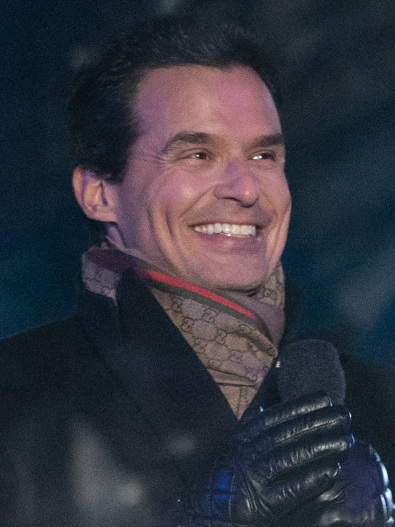
Nominee	Julia Brownley	Antonio Sabàto Jr.
Party	Democratic	Republican
Popular vote	158,216	97,210
Percentage	61.9%	38.1%
- County results Brownley: 50–60% 60–70%
U.S. Representative before election
Julia Brownley
Democratic
Elected U.S. Representative
Julia Brownley
Democratic

The 26th district is based in the southern Central Coast and includes Oxnard and Thousand Oaks. Incumbent Democrat Julia Brownley, who had represented the 26th district since 2013, ran for re-election. She was re-elected with 60.4% of the vote in 2016. The district had a PVI of D+7.

=== Primary election ===
==== Democratic candidates ====
===== Advanced to general =====
- Julia Brownley, incumbent U.S. representative

===== Eliminated in primary =====
- John Nelson, attorney

==== Republican candidates ====
===== Advanced to general =====
- Antonio Sabàto Jr., actor and businessman

===== Eliminated in primary =====
- Jeffrey Burum, business owner and accountant

===== Withdrawn =====
- Rafael Dagnesses, business owner, entrepreneur, candidate for this seat in 2014 and general election candidate in 2016
- Shane Skelton

==== Results ====
Nonpartisan blanket primary results
Party	Candidate	Votes	%
Democratic	Julia Brownley (incumbent)	72,764	54.1
Republican	Antonio Sabàto Jr.	30,107	22.4
Republican	Jeffrey Burum	26,656	19.8
Democratic	John Nelson	4,959	3.7
Total votes		134,486	100.0

=== General election ===
==== Predictions ====
Source	Ranking	As of
The Cook Political Report	Safe D	November 5, 2018
Inside Elections	Safe D	November 5, 2018
Sabato's Crystal Ball	Safe D	November 5, 2018
RealClearPolitics	Safe D	November 5, 2018
Daily Kos	Safe D	November 5, 2018
538	Safe D	November 7, 2018
CNN	Safe D	October 31, 2018
Politico	Safe D	November 4, 2018

==== Endorsements ====
Julia Brownley (D)

Organizations

- Democratic Congressional Campaign Committee "Frontline" Program
- EMILY's List
- J Street PAC

==== Results ====
California's 26th congressional district election, 2018
Party	Candidate	Votes	%
Democratic	Julia Brownley (incumbent)	158,216	61.9
Republican	Antonio Sabàto Jr.	97,210	38.1
Total votes		255,426	100.0
Democratic hold			

== District 27 ==
2018 California's 27th congressional district election
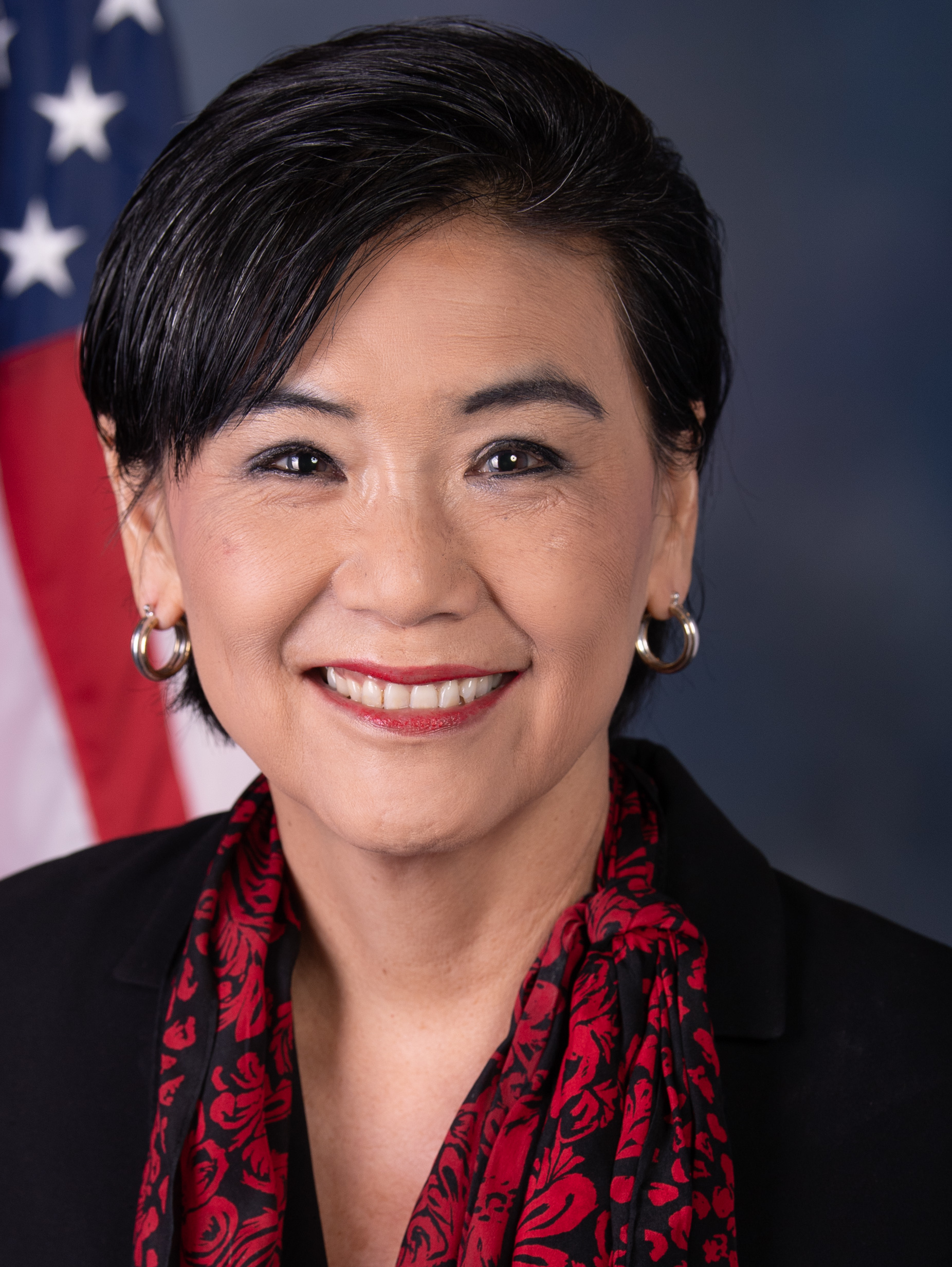

Nominee	Judy Chu	Bryan Witt
Party	Democratic	Democratic
Popular vote	160,504	42,132
Percentage	79.2%	20.8%
U.S. Representative before election
Judy Chu
Democratic
Elected U.S. Representative
Judy Chu
Democratic

The 27th district is based in the San Gabriel Foothills and includes Alhambra, Glendora and Pasadena. Democrat Judy Chu, who had represented the 27th district since 2013 and previously represented the 32nd district from 2009 to 2013, ran for re-election. She was re-elected with 67.4% of the vote in 2016. The district had a PVI of D+16.

=== Primary election ===
==== Democratic candidates ====
===== Advanced to general =====
- Judy Chu, incumbent
- Bryan Witt, railroad operations supervisor

==== Republican candidates ====
===== Withdrawn =====
- Beatrice Cardenas

==== Libertarian candidates ====
===== Withdrawn =====
- Brian Espinoza

==== Results ====
Nonpartisan blanket primary results
Party	Candidate	Votes	%
Democratic	Judy Chu (incumbent)	86,932	83.5
Democratic	Bryan Witt	17,186	16.5
Total votes		104,118	100.0

=== General election ===
==== Predictions ====
Source	Ranking	As of
The Cook Political Report	Safe D	November 5, 2018
Inside Elections	Safe D	November 5, 2018
Sabato's Crystal Ball	Safe D	November 5, 2018
RealClearPolitics	Safe D	November 5, 2018
Daily Kos	Safe D	November 5, 2018
538	Safe D	November 7, 2018
CNN	Safe D	October 31, 2018
Politico	Safe D	November 4, 2018

==== Endorsements ====
Judy Chu (D)

Organizations

- J Street PAC

==== Results ====
California's 27th congressional district election, 2018
Party	Candidate	Votes	%
Democratic	Judy Chu (incumbent)	160,504	79.2
Democratic	Bryan Witt	42,132	20.8
Total votes		202,636	100.0
Democratic hold			

== District 28 ==
2018 California's 28th congressional district election
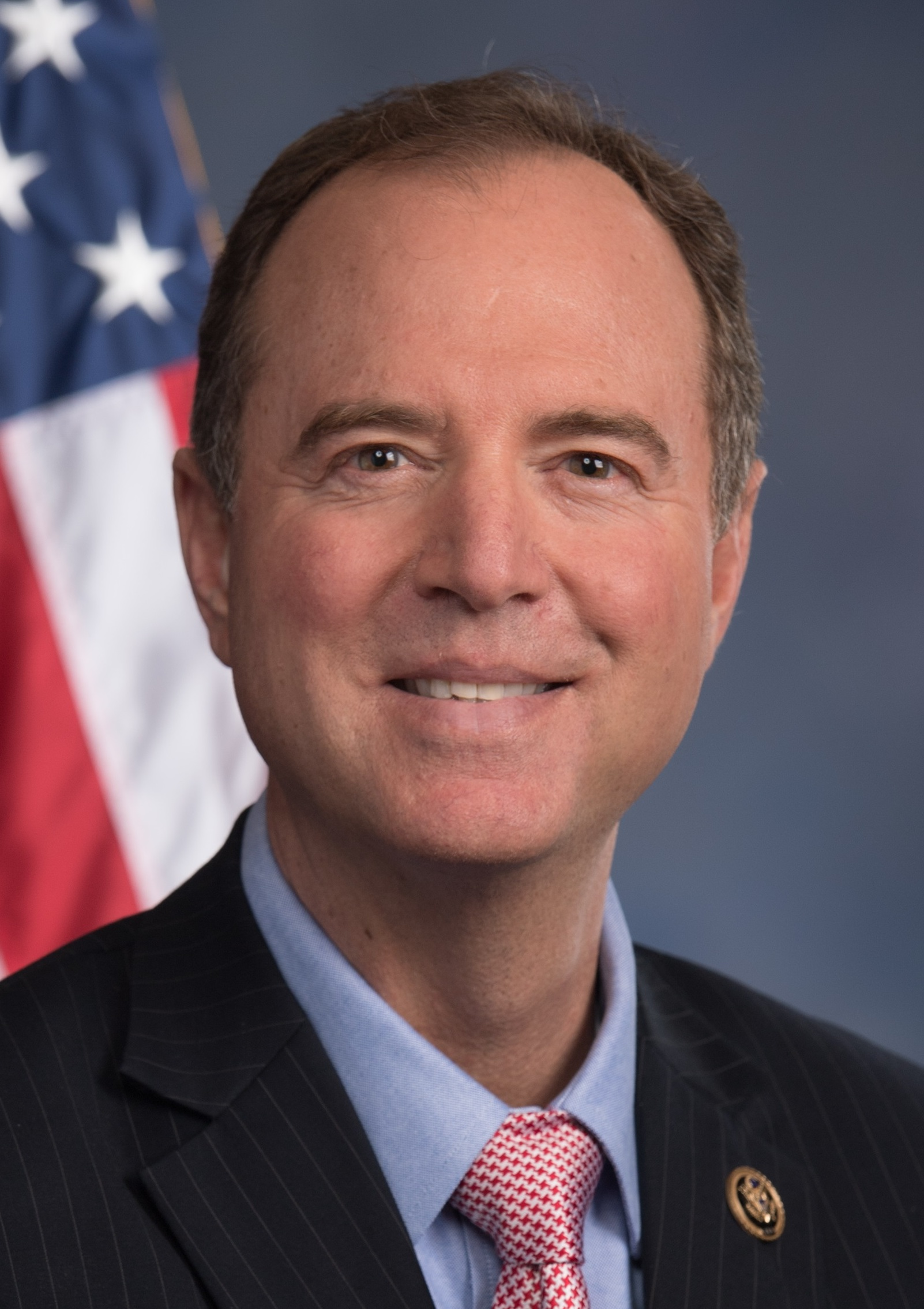

Nominee	Adam Schiff	Johnny Nalbandian
Party	Democratic	Republican
Popular vote	196,662	54,272
Percentage	78.4%	21.6%
- County results B. Schiff: 70–80%
U.S. Representative before election
Adam Schiff
Democratic
Elected U.S. Representative
Adam Schiff
Democratic

The 28th district is based in the northern Los Angeles suburbs and includes Burbank, Glendale, La Cañada Flintridge as well as parts of central Los Angeles. Incumbent Democrat Adam Schiff, who had represented the 28th district since 2013 and previously represented the 29th district from 2003 to 2013 and the 27th district from 2001 to 2003, ran for re-election. He was re-elected with 78.0% of the vote in 2016. The district had a PVI of D+23.

=== Primary election ===
==== Democratic candidates ====
===== Advanced to general =====
- Adam Schiff, incumbent U.S. representative

===== Eliminated in primary =====
- Sal Genovese, community services director and candidate for this seat in 2012, 2014 & 2016

===== Withdrawn =====
- Kim Gruenenfelder
- Damien Nichols

==== Republican candidates ====
===== Advanced to general =====
- Johnny Nalbandian, food industry businessman

==== Independent candidates ====
===== Withdrawn =====
- Juan Markos
- Mark Shayani

==== Results ====
Nonpartisan blanket primary results
Party	Candidate	Votes	%
Democratic	Adam Schiff (incumbent)	94,249	73.5
Republican	Johnny Nalbandian	26,566	20.7
Democratic	Sal Genovese	7,406	5.8
Total votes		128,221	100.0

=== General election ===
==== Predictions ====
Source	Ranking	As of
The Cook Political Report	Safe D	November 5, 2018
Inside Elections	Safe D	November 5, 2018
Sabato's Crystal Ball	Safe D	November 5, 2018
RealClearPolitics	Safe D	November 5, 2018
Daily Kos	Safe D	November 5, 2018
538	Safe D	November 7, 2018
CNN	Safe D	October 31, 2018
Politico	Safe D	November 4, 2018

==== Debate ====
2018 California's 28th congressional district debate
No.	Date	Host	Moderator	Link	Democratic	Republican
Key: P Participant A Absent N Not invited I Invited W Withdrawn						
Key: P Participant A Absent N Not invited I Invited W Withdrawn					Adam Schiff	Johnny Nalbandian
1	October 24, 2018	League of Women Voters of Glendale/Burbank	Rita Zwern		P	P

==== Results ====
California's 28th congressional district election, 2018
Party	Candidate	Votes	%
Democratic	Adam Schiff (incumbent)	196,662	78.4
Republican	Johnny Nalbandian	54,272	21.6
Total votes		250,934	100.0
Democratic hold			

== District 29 ==
2018 California's 29th congressional district election
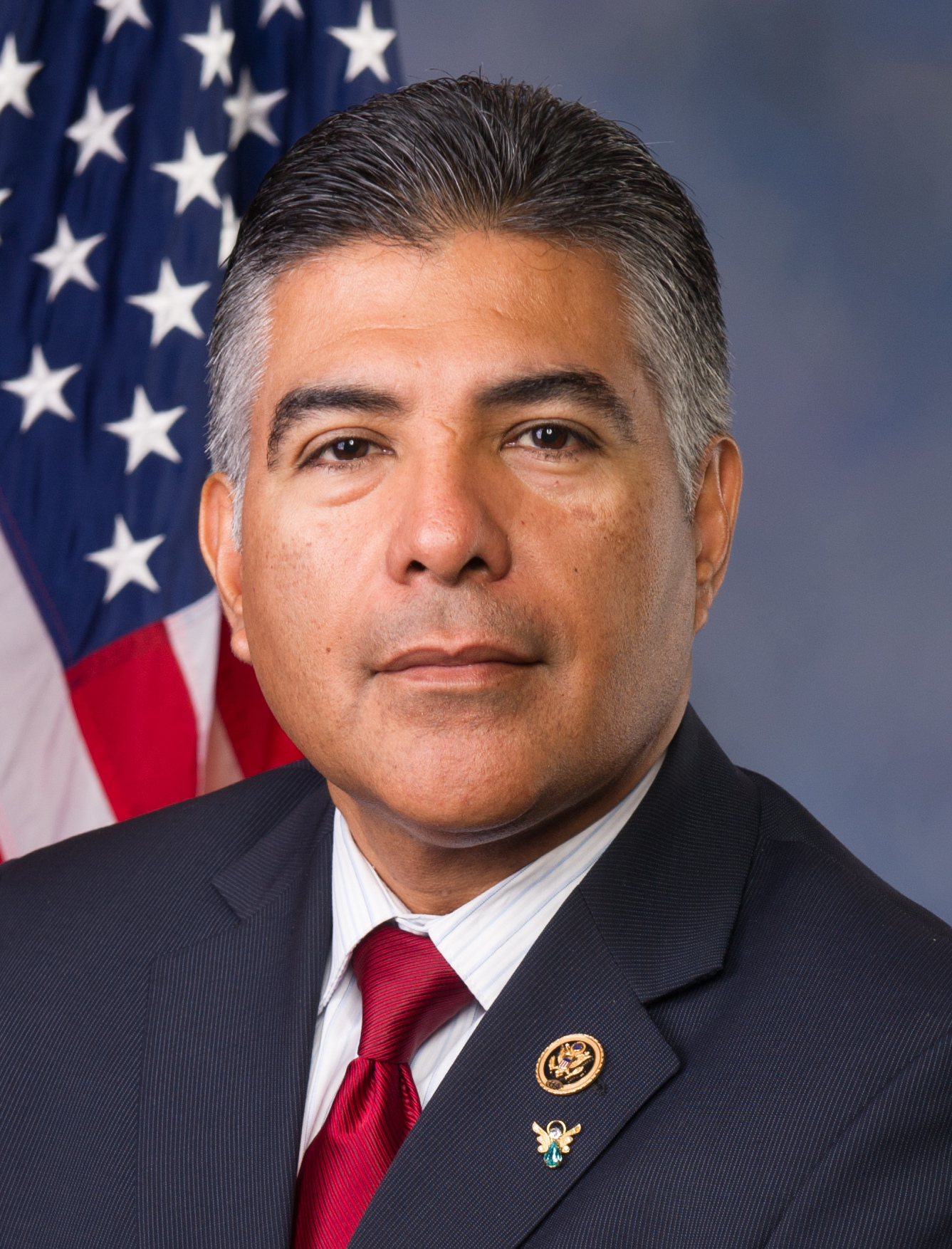

Nominee	Tony Cárdenas	Benito Benny Bernal
Party	Democratic	Republican
Popular vote	124,697	29,995
Percentage	80.6%	19.4%
- County results Cardenas: 80–90%
U.S. Representative before election
Tony Cárdenas
Democratic
Elected U.S. Representative
Tony Cárdenas
Democratic

The 29th district is based in the northeastern San Fernando Valley. Incumbent Democrat Tony Cárdenas, who had represented the 29th district since 2013, ran for re-election. He was re-elected with 74.7% of the vote in 2016. The district had a PVI of D+29.

=== Primary election ===
==== Democratic candidates ====
===== Advanced to general =====
- Tony Cárdenas, incumbent U.S. representative

===== Eliminated in primary =====
- Joseph Shammas, retired military officer

==== Republican candidates ====
===== Advanced to general =====
- Benito Bernal, educational transportation supervisor

==== Green candidates ====
===== Eliminated in primary =====
- Angelica Dueñas, Sun Valley Neighborhood Council member

==== Independent candidates ====
===== Eliminated in primary =====
- Juan Rey, mechanic

==== Endorsements ====
Angelica Maria Dueñas (G)

Organizations

- Peace and Freedom Party

Local officials

- Gayle McLaughlin (Independent), former mayor of Richmond

==== Results ====
Nonpartisan blanket primary results
Party	Candidate	Votes	%
Democratic	Tony Cárdenas (incumbent)	43,579	66.7
Republican	Benito Benny Bernal	11,353	17.4
Democratic	Joseph "Joe" Shammas	5,278	8.1
Green	Angelica Maria Dueñas	4,164	6.4
No party preference	Juan Rey	944	1.4
Total votes		65,318	100.0

=== General election ===
==== Predictions ====
Source	Ranking	As of
The Cook Political Report	Safe D	November 5, 2018
Inside Elections	Safe D	November 5, 2018
Sabato's Crystal Ball	Safe D	November 5, 2018
RealClearPolitics	Safe D	November 5, 2018
Daily Kos	Safe D	November 5, 2018
538	Safe D	November 7, 2018
CNN	Safe D	October 31, 2018
Politico	Safe D	November 4, 2018

==== Endorsements ====
Benito Benny Bernal (R)

Organizations

- Golden State Coalition

==== Results ====
California's 29th congressional district election, 2018
Party	Candidate	Votes	%
Democratic	Tony Cárdenas (incumbent)	124,697	80.6
Republican	Benito Benny Bernal	29,995	19.4
Total votes		154,692	100.0
Democratic hold			

== District 30 ==
2018 California's 30th congressional district election
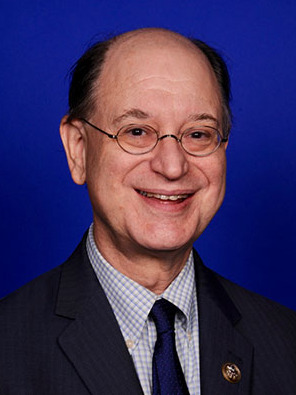

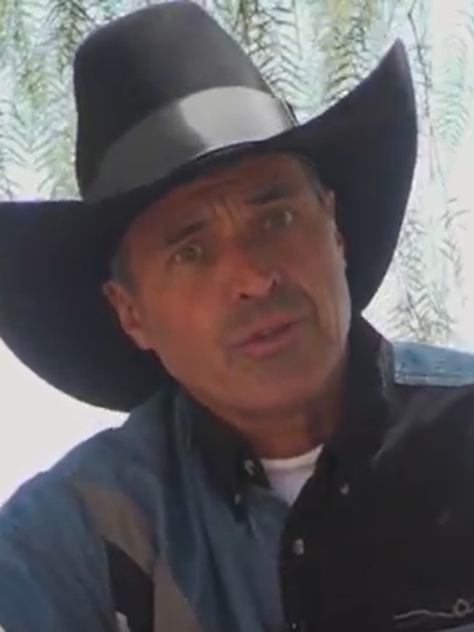
Nominee	Brad Sherman	Mark Reed
Party	Democratic	Republican
Popular vote	191,573	69,420
Percentage	73.4%	26.6%
- County results Sherman: 50–60% 70–80%
U.S. Representative before election
Brad Sherman
Democratic
Elected U.S. Representative
Brad Sherman
Democratic

The 30th district is based in the western San Fernando Valley and includes Sherman Oaks. Democrat Brad Sherman, who had represented the 30th district since 2013 and previously represented the 27th district from 2003 to 2013 and the 24th district from 1997 to 2003, ran for re-election. He was re-elected with 72.6% of the vote in 2016. The district had a PVI of D+18.

=== Primary election ===
==== Democratic candidates ====
===== Advanced to general =====
- Brad Sherman, incumbent U.S. representative

===== Eliminated in primary =====
- Jon Pelzer
- Raji Rab, aviator, educator and candidate for this seat in 2016

==== Republican candidates ====
===== Advanced to general =====
- Mark Reed, realtor, businessman, rancher and general election candidate for this seat in 2014 & 2016

===== Withdrawn =====
- Joseph Schrage

==== Libertarian candidates ====
===== Withdrawn =====
- Rick Dawson

==== Endorsements ====
Jon Pelzer (D)

Local officials

- Gayle McLaughlin (Independent), former mayor of Richmond

==== Results ====
Nonpartisan blanket primary results
Party	Candidate	Votes	%
Democratic	Brad Sherman (incumbent)	80,038	62.3
Republican	Mark Reed	35,046	27.3
Democratic	Raji Rab	6,753	5.3
Democratic	Jon Pelzer	6,642	5.2
Total votes		128,479	100.0

=== General election ===
==== Predictions ====
Source	Ranking	As of
The Cook Political Report	Safe D	November 5, 2018
Inside Elections	Safe D	November 5, 2018
Sabato's Crystal Ball	Safe D	November 5, 2018
RealClearPolitics	Safe D	November 5, 2018
Daily Kos	Safe D	November 5, 2018
538	Safe D	November 7, 2018
CNN	Safe D	October 31, 2018
Politico	Safe D	November 4, 2018

==== Debate ====
2018 California's 28th congressional district debate
No.	Date	Host	Moderator	Link	Democratic	Republican
Key: P Participant A Absent N Not invited I Invited W Withdrawn						
Key: P Participant A Absent N Not invited I Invited W Withdrawn					Brad Sherman	Mark Reed
1	October 24, 2018	League of Women Voters of Glendale/Burbank	Rita Zwern		P	P

==== Results ====
California's 30th congressional district election, 2018
Party	Candidate	Votes	%
Democratic	Brad Sherman (incumbent)	191,573	73.4
Republican	Mark Reed	69,420	26.6
Total votes		260,993	100.0
Democratic hold			

== District 31 ==
2018 California's 31st congressional district election
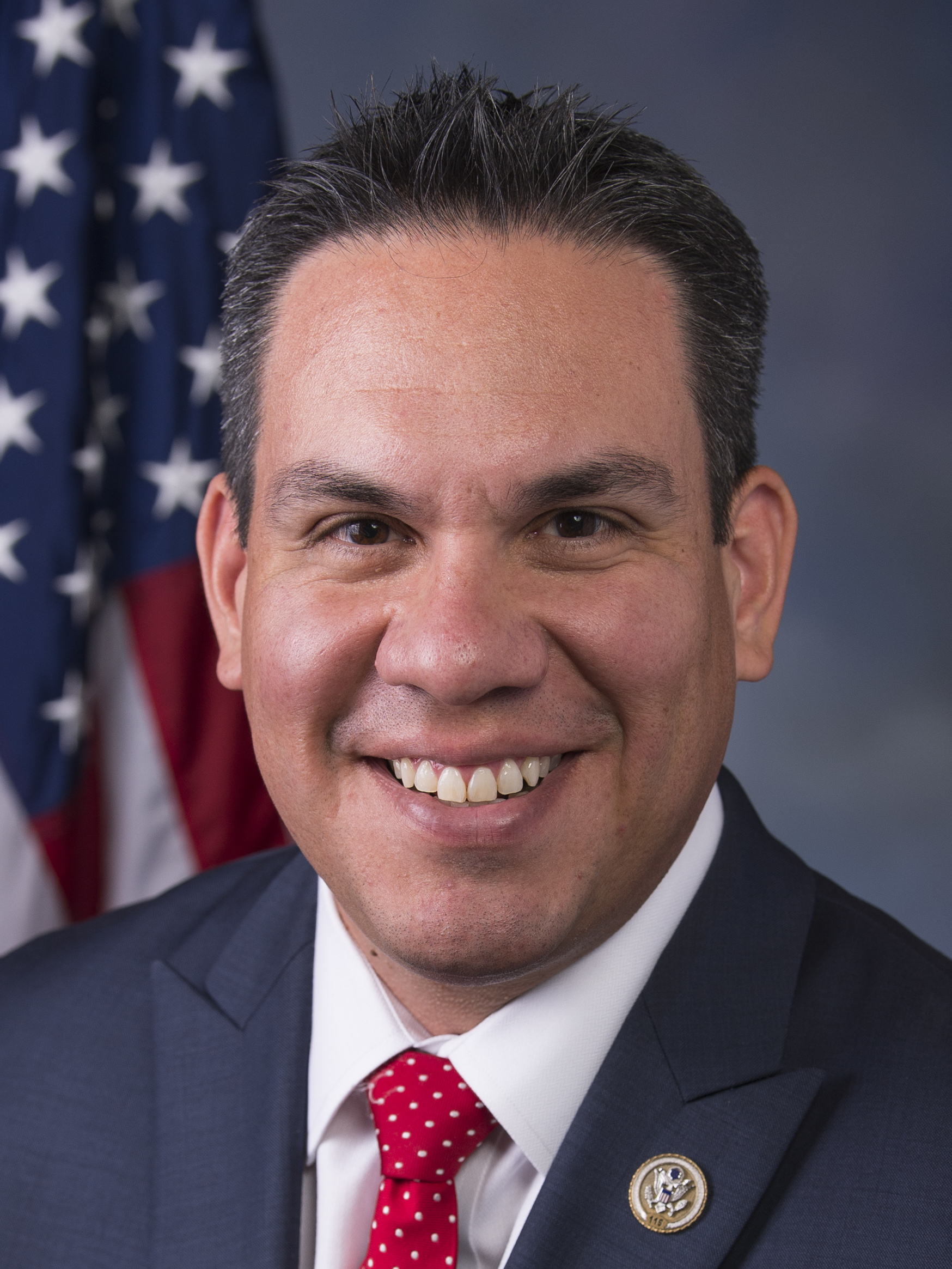

Nominee	Pete Aguilar	Sean Flynn
Party	Democratic	Republican
Popular vote	110,143	77,352
Percentage	58.7%	41.3%
- County results Aguilar: 50–60%
U.S. Representative before election
Pete Aguilar
Democratic
Elected U.S. Representative
Pete Aguilar
Democratic

The 31st district is based in the Inland Empire and includes San Bernardino, Redlands and Rancho Cucamonga. Incumbent Democrat Pete Aguilar, who had represented the 31st district since 2015, ran for re-election. He was re-elected with 56.1% of the vote in 2016. The district had a PVI of D+8.

=== Primary election ===
==== Democratic candidates ====
===== Advanced to general =====
- Pete Aguilar, incumbent U.S. representative

===== Eliminated in primary =====
- Kaisar Ahmed, retired teacher

==== Republican candidates ====
===== Advanced to general =====
- Sean Flynn, business owner and economist

==== Results ====
Nonpartisan blanket primary results
Party	Candidate	Votes	%
Democratic	Pete Aguilar (incumbent)	41,337	45.9
Republican	Sean Flynn	40,622	45.1
Democratic	Kaisar Ahmed	8,108	9.0
Total votes		90,067	100.0

=== General election ===
==== Predictions ====
Source	Ranking	As of
The Cook Political Report	Safe D	November 5, 2018
Inside Elections	Safe D	November 5, 2018
Sabato's Crystal Ball	Safe D	November 5, 2018
RealClearPolitics	Safe D	November 5, 2018
Daily Kos	Safe D	November 5, 2018
538	Safe D	November 7, 2018
CNN	Safe D	October 31, 2018
Politico	Safe D	November 4, 2018

==== Endorsements ====
Pete Aguilar (D)

Organizations

- J Street PAC
Sean Flynn (R)

Organizations

- National Republican Congressional Committee "Contender" Program

==== Results ====
California's 31st congressional district election, 2018
Party	Candidate	Votes	%
Democratic	Pete Aguilar (incumbent)	110,143	58.7
Republican	Sean Flynn	77,352	41.3
Majority		32,791	17.4
Total votes		187,495	100.0
Democratic hold			

== District 32 ==
2018 California's 32nd congressional district election
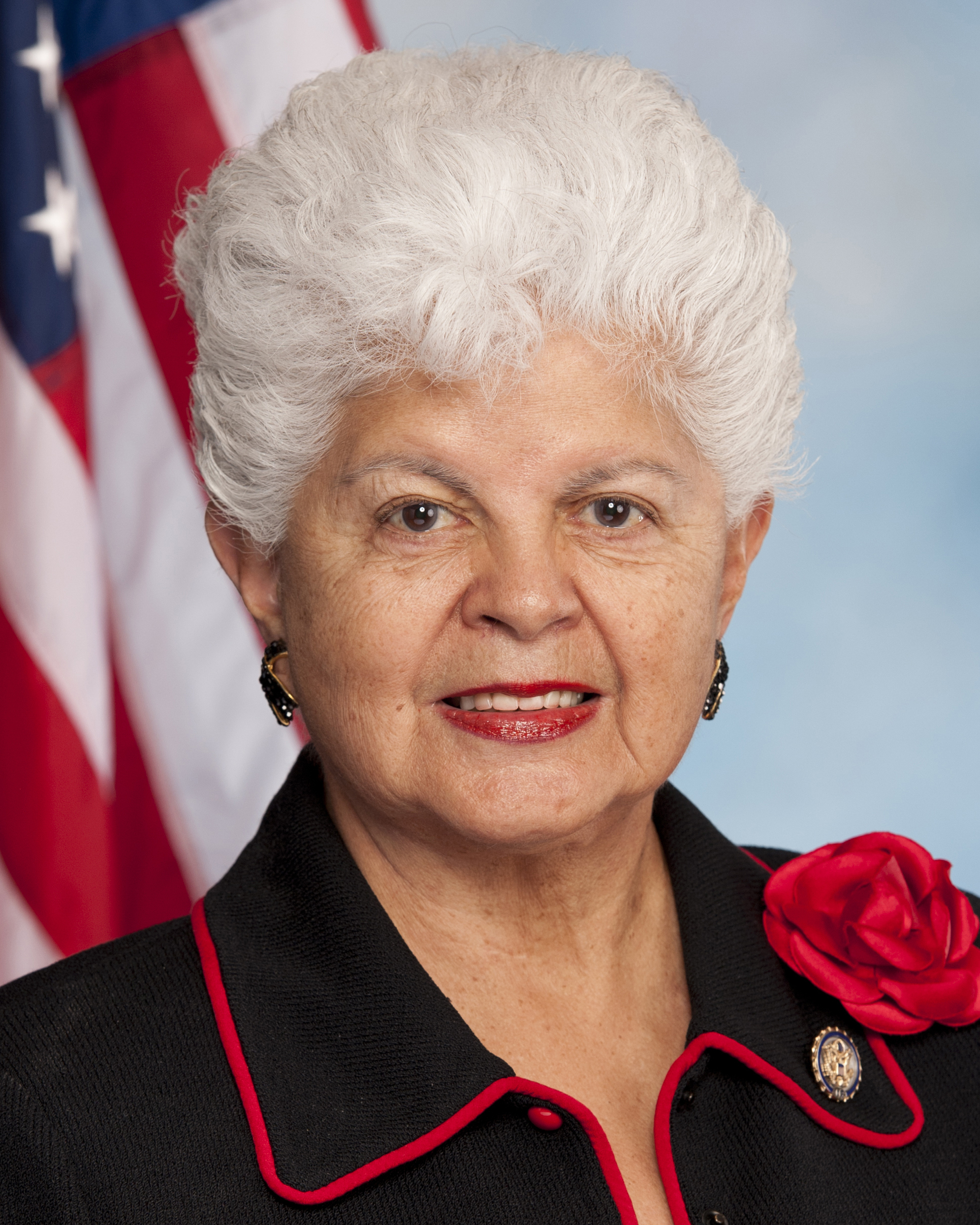

Nominee	Grace Napolitano	Joshua Scott
Party	Democratic	Republican
Popular vote	121,759	55,272
Percentage	68.8%	31.2%
- County results Flores Napolitano: 60–70%
U.S. Representative before election
Grace Napolitano
Democratic
Elected U.S. Representative
Grace Napolitano
Democratic

The 32nd district is based in the San Gabriel Valley and includes El Monte and West Covina. Democrat Grace Napolitano, who had represented the 32nd district since 2013 and previously represented the 38th district from 2003 to 2013 and the 34th district from 1999 to 2003, ran for re-election. She was re-elected with 61.6% of the vote in 2016. The district had a PVI of D+17.

=== Primary election ===
==== Democratic candidates ====
===== Advanced to general =====
- Grace Napolitano, incumbent U.S. representative

===== Eliminated in primary =====
- Ricardo De La Fuente, businessman and son of 2016 presidential candidate Rocky De La Fuente

===== Withdrawn =====
- Mary Ann Lutz, former mayor of Monrovia and policy advisor to Napolitano

===== Declined =====
- Andre Quintero, mayor of El Monte

==== Republican candidates ====
===== Advanced to general =====
- Joshua Scott

==== Results ====
Nonpartisan blanket primary results
Party	Candidate	Votes	%
Democratic	Grace Napolitano (incumbent)	56,674	99.9
Republican	Joshua M. Scott (write-in)	42	0.1
Democratic	Ricardo De La Fuente (write-in)	1	0.0
Total votes		56,717	100.0

=== General election ===
==== Predictions ====
Source	Ranking	As of
The Cook Political Report	Safe D	November 5, 2018
Inside Elections	Safe D	November 5, 2018
Sabato's Crystal Ball	Safe D	November 5, 2018
RealClearPolitics	Safe D	November 5, 2018
Daily Kos	Safe D	November 5, 2018
538	Safe D	November 7, 2018
CNN	Safe D	October 31, 2018
Politico	Safe D	November 4, 2018

==== Results ====
California's 32nd congressional district election, 2018
Party	Candidate	Votes	%
Democratic	Grace Napolitano (incumbent)	121,759	68.8
Republican	Joshua M. Scott	55,272	31.2
Total votes		177,031	100.0
Democratic hold			

== District 33 ==
2018 California's 33rd congressional district election
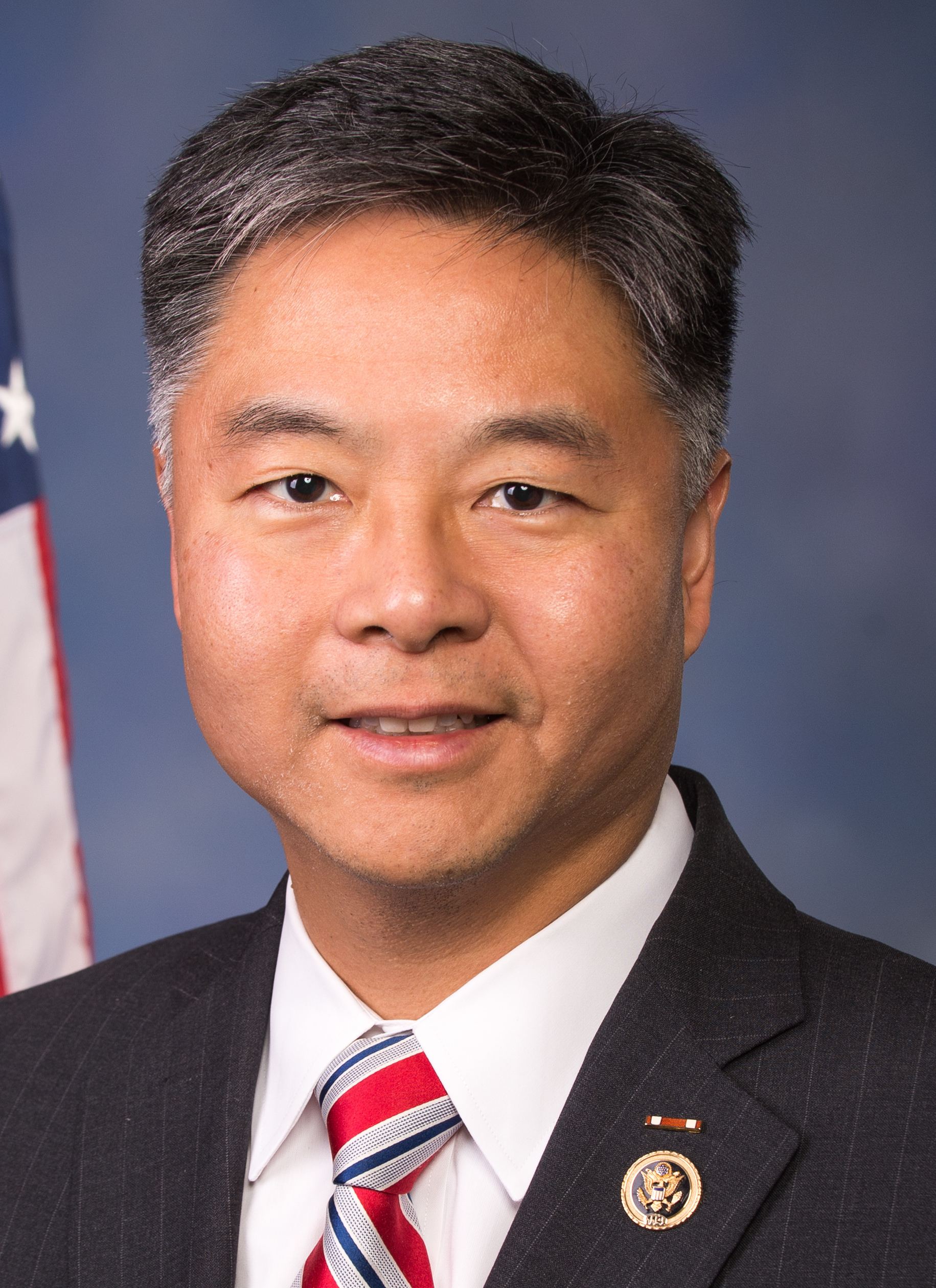

Nominee	Ted Lieu	Kenneth Wright
Party	Democratic	Republican
Popular vote	219,091	93,769
Percentage	70.0%	30.0%
- County results W. Lieu: 70–80%
U.S. Representative before election
Ted Lieu
Democratic
Elected U.S. Representative
Ted Lieu
Democratic

The 33rd district is based in coastal Los Angeles County and includes Beverly Hills and Santa Monica. Democrat Ted Lieu, who had represented the 33rd district since 2015, ran for re-election. He was re-elected with 66.4% of the vote in 2016. The district had a PVI of D+16.

=== Primary election ===
==== Democratic candidates ====
===== Advanced to general =====
- Ted Lieu, incumbent U.S. representative

===== Eliminated in primary =====
- Emory Rodgers, human rights advocate

===== Withdrawn =====
- Alexis Edelstein

==== Republican candidates ====
===== Advanced to general =====
- Kenneth Wright, physician, surgeon and general election candidate for this seat in 2016

==== Results ====
Nonpartisan blanket primary results
Party	Candidate	Votes	%
Democratic	Ted Lieu (incumbent)	100,581	61.7
Republican	Kenneth Wright	48,985	30.1
Democratic	Emory Rodgers	13,435	8.2
Total votes		163,001	100.0

=== General election ===
==== Predictions ====
Source	Ranking	As of
The Cook Political Report	Safe D	November 5, 2018
Inside Elections	Safe D	November 5, 2018
Sabato's Crystal Ball	Safe D	November 5, 2018
RealClearPolitics	Safe D	November 5, 2018
Daily Kos	Safe D	November 5, 2018
538	Safe D	November 7, 2018
CNN	Safe D	October 31, 2018
Politico	Safe D	November 4, 2018

==== Results ====
California's 33rd congressional district election, 2018
Party	Candidate	Votes	%
Democratic	Ted Lieu (incumbent)	219,091	70.0
Republican	Kenneth Wright	93,769	30.0
Total votes		312,860	100.0
Democratic hold			

== District 34 ==
2018 California's 34th congressional district election
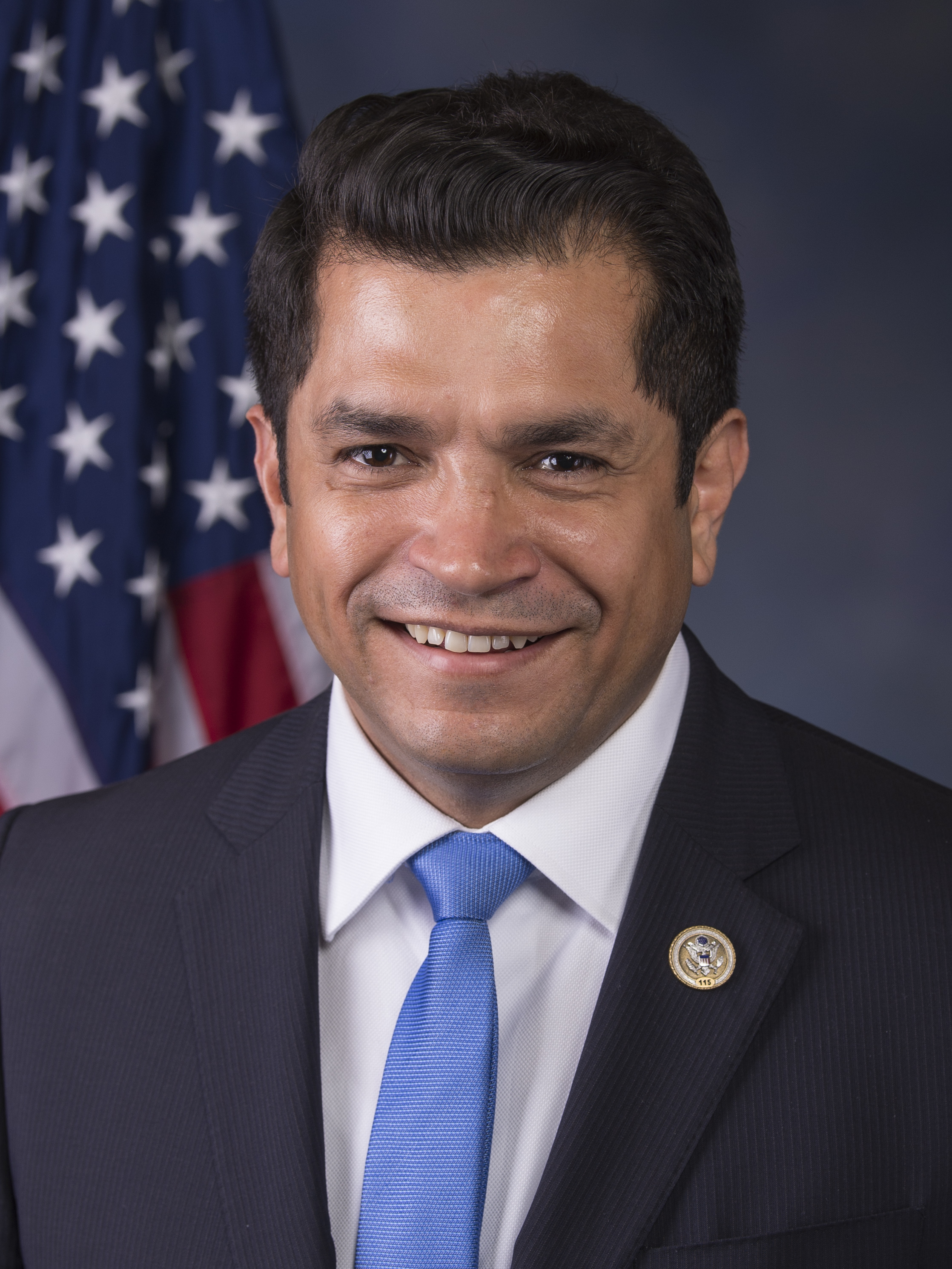

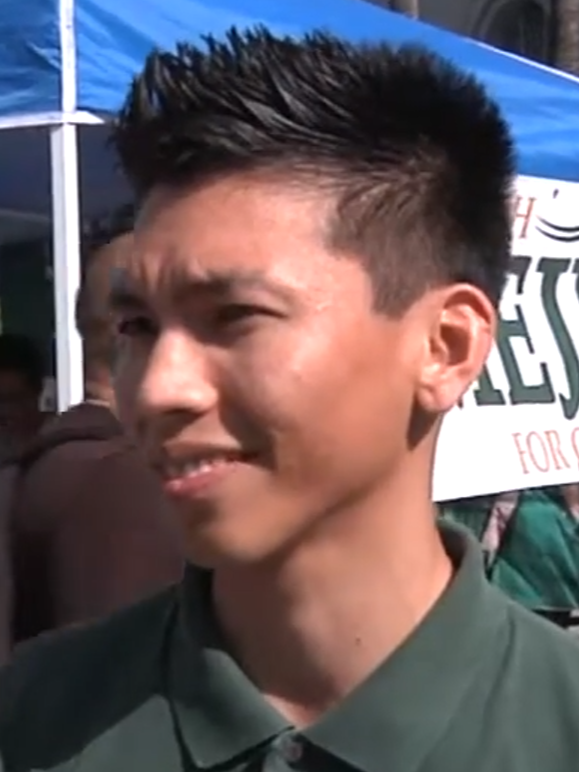
Nominee	Jimmy Gomez	Kenneth Mejia
Party	Democratic	Green
Popular vote	110,195	41,711
Percentage	72.5%	27.5%
- County results Gomez: 70–80%
U.S. Representative before election
Jimmy Gomez
Democratic
Elected U.S. Representative
Jimmy Gomez
Democratic

The 34th district is based in central Los Angeles and includes Boyle Heights, Chinatown and Downtown Los Angeles. Incumbent Democrat Jimmy Gomez, who had represented the 34th district since 2017, ran for re-election. He was elected with 59.2% of the vote in 2017. The district had a PVI of D+35.

=== Primary election ===
==== Democratic candidates ====
===== Advanced to general =====
- Jimmy Gomez, incumbent U.S. representative

==== Republican candidates ====
===== Withdrawn =====
- Simon Mark Alvarez

==== Libertarian candidates ====
===== Eliminated in primary =====
- Angela McArdle, paralegal, secretary of the Libertarian Party of California and candidate for this seat in 2017

==== Green candidates ====
===== Advanced to general =====
- Kenneth Mejia, certified public accountant and candidate for this seat in 2016 & 2017

==== Results ====
Nonpartisan blanket primary results
Party	Candidate	Votes	%
Democratic	Jimmy Gomez (incumbent)	54,661	78.7
Green	Kenneth Mejia	8,987	12.9
Libertarian	Angela McArdle	5,804	8.4
Total votes		69,452	100.0

=== General election ===
==== Predictions ====
Source	Ranking	As of
The Cook Political Report	Safe D	November 5, 2018
Inside Elections	Safe D	November 5, 2018
Sabato's Crystal Ball	Safe D	November 5, 2018
RealClearPolitics	Safe D	November 5, 2018
Daily Kos	Safe D	November 5, 2018
538	Safe D	November 7, 2018
CNN	Safe D	October 31, 2018
Politico	Safe D	November 4, 2018

==== Endorsements ====
Kenneth Mejia (G)

Organizations

- Americans for Democratic Action
- Peace and Freedom Party
- Socialist Party of California
- The Young Turks

Local officials

- Gayle McLaughlin, mayor of Richmond 2007–2015

Individuals

- Rosa Clemente, Green nominee for vice president of the United States in 2008

==== Results ====
California's 34th congressional district election, 2018
Party	Candidate	Votes	%
Democratic	Jimmy Gomez (incumbent)	110,195	72.5
Green	Kenneth Mejia	41,711	27.5
Total votes		151,906	100.0
Democratic hold			

== District 35 ==
2018 California's 35th congressional district election
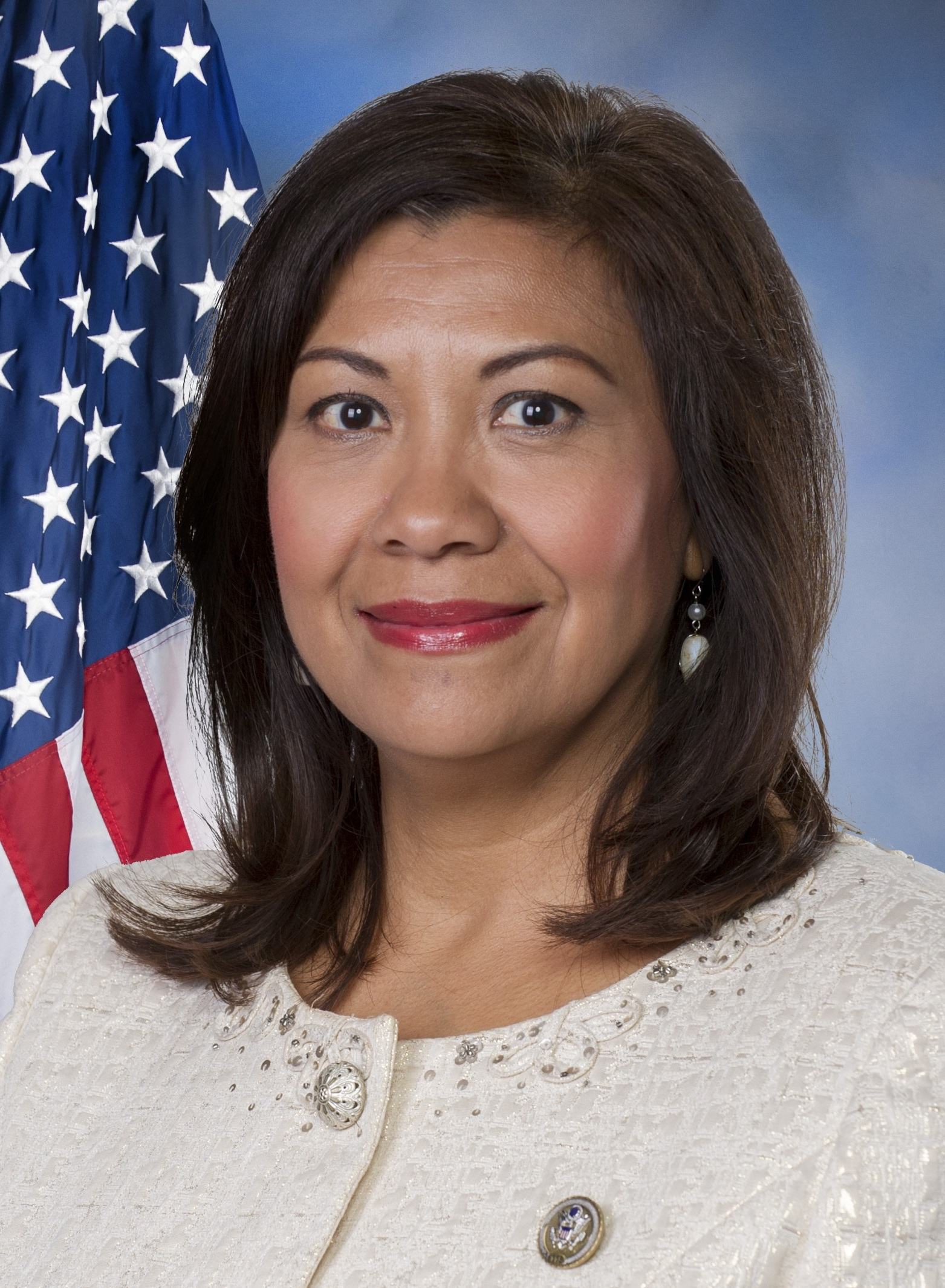

Nominee	Norma Torres	Christian Valiente
Party	Democratic	Republican
Popular vote	103,420	45,604
Percentage	69.4%	30.6%
- County results J. Torres: 60–70% 70–80%
U.S. Representative before election
Norma Torres
Democratic
Elected U.S. Representative
Norma Torres
Democratic

The 35th district is based in the Inland Empire and includes Fontana, Ontario, and Pomona. Incumbent Democrat Norma Torres, who had represented the 35th district since 2015, ran for re-election. She was re-elected with 72.4% of the vote in 2016. The district had a PVI of D+19.

=== Primary election ===
==== Democratic candidates ====
===== Advanced to general =====
- Norma Torres, incumbent U.S. representative

===== Eliminated in primary =====
- Joe Baca, former U.S. representative

==== Republican candidates ====
===== Advanced to general =====
- Christian Valiente, small business owner

==== Results ====
Nonpartisan blanket primary results
Party	Candidate	Votes	%
Democratic	Norma Torres (incumbent)	32,474	51.2
Republican	Christian Valiente	21,572	34.0
Democratic	Joe Baca	9,417	14.7
Total votes		63,463	100.0

=== General election ===
==== Predictions ====
Source	Ranking	As of
The Cook Political Report	Safe D	November 5, 2018
Inside Elections	Safe D	November 5, 2018
Sabato's Crystal Ball	Safe D	November 5, 2018
RealClearPolitics	Safe D	November 5, 2018
Daily Kos	Safe D	November 5, 2018
538	Safe D	November 7, 2018
CNN	Safe D	October 31, 2018
Politico	Safe D	November 4, 2018

==== Results ====
California's 35th congressional district election, 2018
Party	Candidate	Votes	%
Democratic	Norma Torres (incumbent)	103,420	69.4
Republican	Christian Valiente	45,604	30.6
Total votes		149,024	100.0
Democratic hold			

== District 36 ==
2018 California's 36th congressional district election
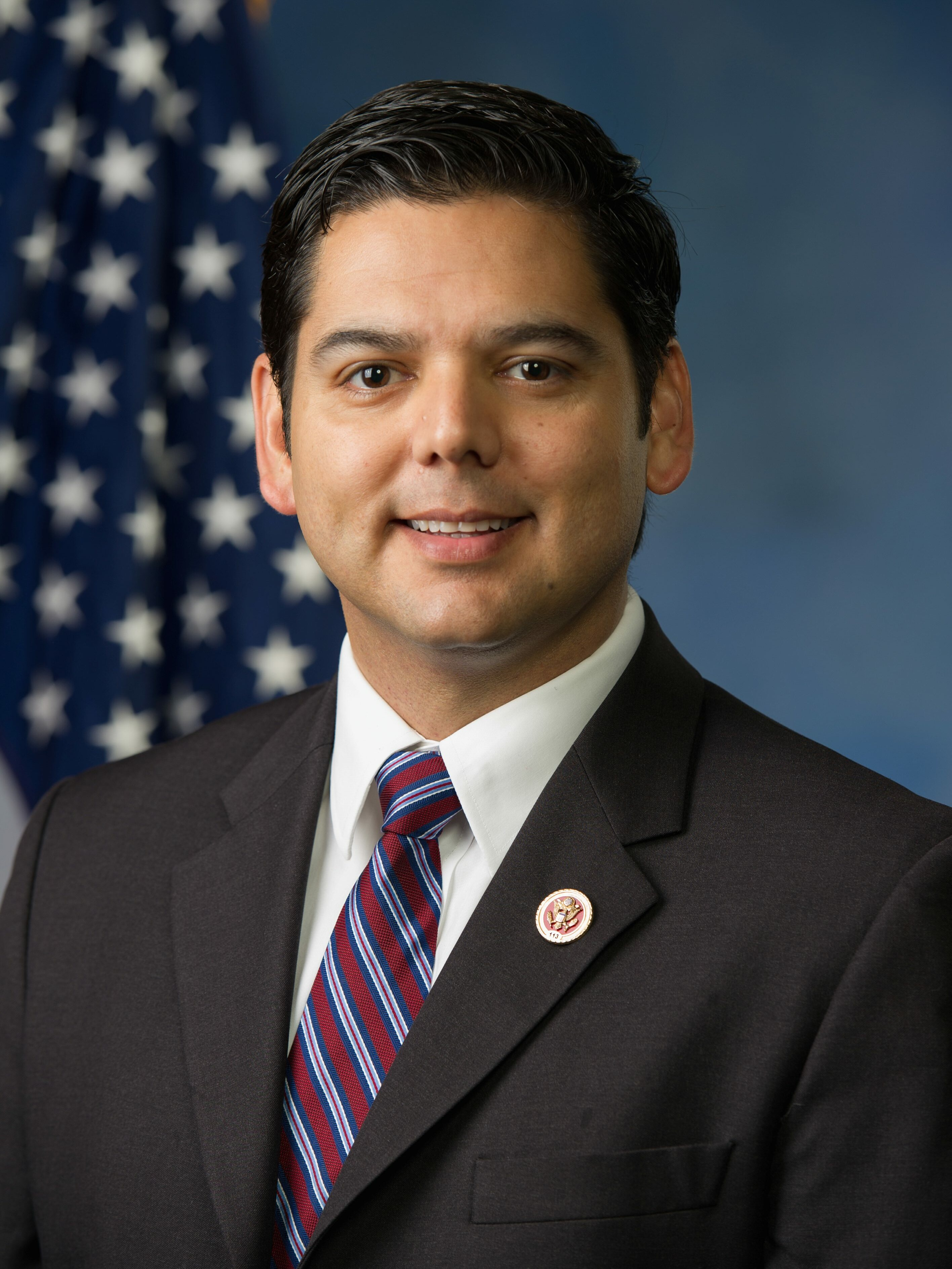

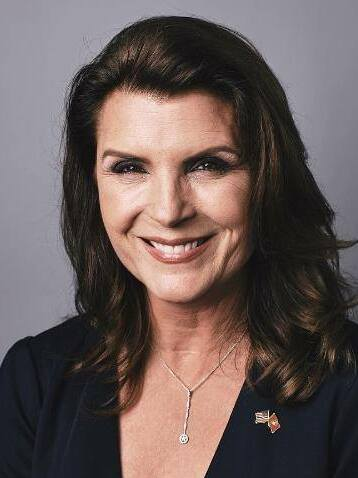
Nominee	Raul Ruiz	Kimberlin Brown Pelzer
Party	Democratic	Republican
Popular vote	122,169	84,839
Percentage	59.0%	41.0%
- County results Ruiz: 50–60%
U.S. Representative before election
Raul Ruiz
Democratic
Elected U.S. Representative
Raul Ruiz
Democratic

The 36th district is based in eastern Riverside County and includes Palm Springs. Democrat Raul Ruiz, who had represented the 36th district since 2013, ran for re-election. He was re-elected with 62.1% of the vote in 2016. The district had a PVI of D+2.

=== Primary election ===
==== Democratic candidates ====
===== Advanced to general =====
- Raul Ruiz, incumbent U.S. representative

==== Republican candidates ====
California's 36th district was included on the list of Democratic-held seats being targeted by the National Republican Congressional Committee in 2018.

===== Advanced to general =====
- Kimberlin Brown Pelzer, actress and small business owner

===== Eliminated in primary =====
- Dan Ball, television journalist and realtor
- Robert Bentley, software developer
- Doug Hassett, businessman
- Stephan Wolkowicz, financial accountant and candidate for this seat in 2016

==== Results ====
Nonpartisan blanket primary results
Party	Candidate	Votes	%
Democratic	Raul Ruiz (incumbent)	65,554	55.0
Republican	Kimberlin Brown Pelzer	27,648	23.2
Republican	Dan Ball	9,312	7.8
Republican	Douglas Hassett	6,001	5.0
Republican	Stephan J. Wolkowicz	5,576	4.7
Republican	Robert Bentley	5,030	4.2
Total votes		110,741	100.0

=== General election ===
==== Predictions ====
Source	Ranking	As of
The Cook Political Report	Safe D	November 5, 2018
Inside Elections	Safe D	November 5, 2018
Sabato's Crystal Ball	Safe D	November 5, 2018
RealClearPolitics	Safe D	November 5, 2018
Daily Kos	Safe D	November 5, 2018
538	Safe D	November 7, 2018
CNN	Safe D	October 31, 2018
Politico	Safe D	November 4, 2018

==== Endorsements ====
Raul Ruiz (D)

Organizations

- Democratic Congressional Campaign Committee "Frontline" Program
- J Street PAC
Kimberlin Brown Pelzer (R)

Organizations

- National Republican Congressional Committee "On the Radar" Program

==== Results ====
California's 36th congressional district election, 2018
Party	Candidate	Votes	%
Democratic	Raul Ruiz (incumbent)	122,169	59.0
Republican	Kimberlin Brown Pelzer	84,839	41.0
Majority		37,330	18.0
Total votes		207,008	100.0
Democratic hold			

== District 37 ==
2018 California's 37th congressional district election
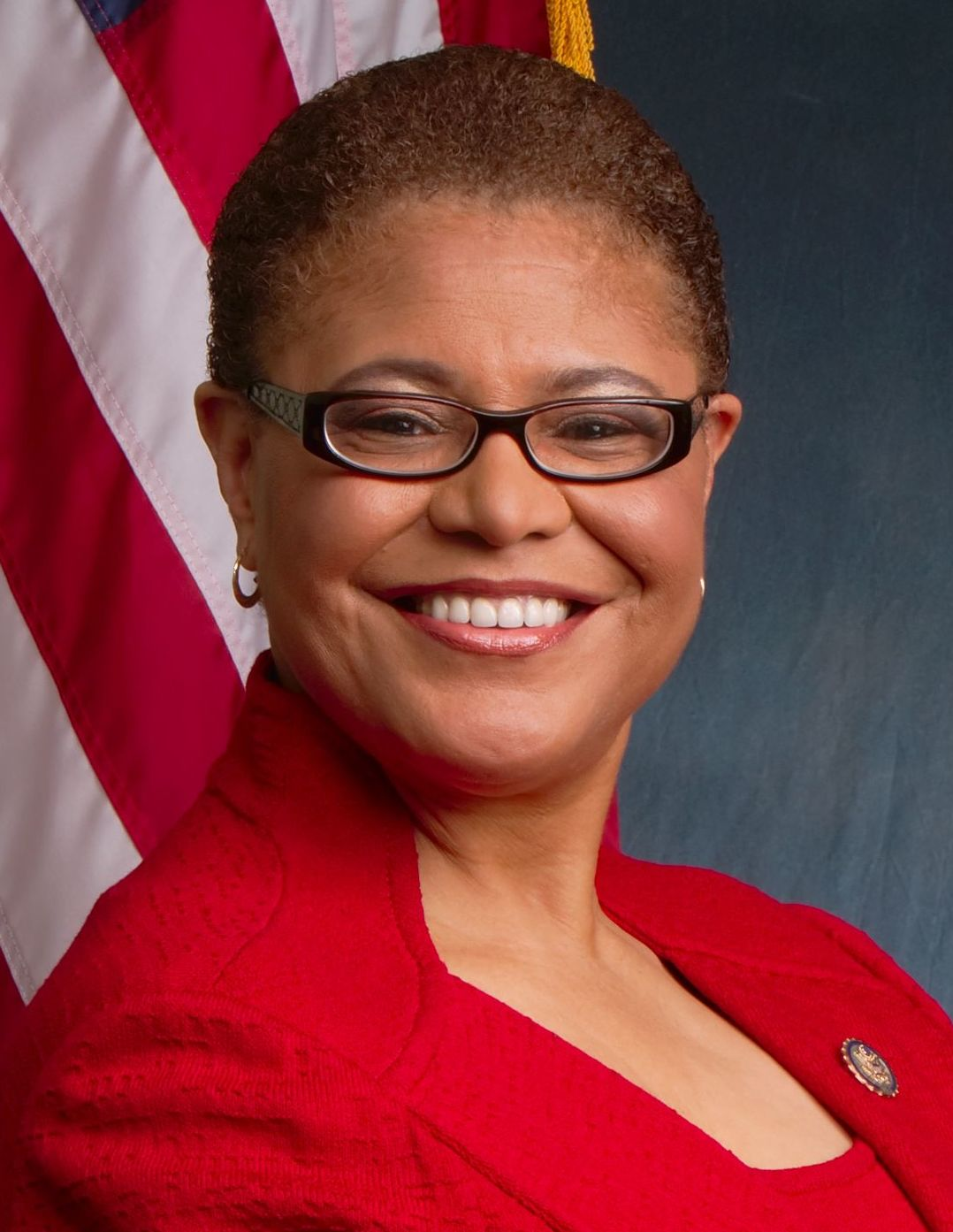

Nominee	Karen Bass	Ron J. Bassilian
Party	Democratic	Republican
Popular vote	210,555	25,823
Percentage	89.1%	10.9%
- County results Bass: 80–90%
U.S. Representative before election
Karen Bass
Democratic
Elected U.S. Representative
Karen Bass
Democratic

The 37th district is based in South Los Angeles and includes Crenshaw, Exposition Park and Culver City. Incumbent Democrat Karen Bass, who had represented the 37th district since 2013 and previously represented the 33rd district from 2011 to 2013, ran for re-election. She was re-elected with 81.1% of the vote in 2016. The district had a PVI of D+37.

=== Primary election ===
==== Democratic candidates ====
===== Advanced to general =====
- Karen Bass, incumbent U.S. representative

==== Republican candidates ====
===== Advanced to general =====
- Ron J. Bassilian, e-mail administrator

==== Results ====
Nonpartisan blanket primary results
Party	Candidate	Votes	%
Democratic	Karen Bass (incumbent)	99,118	89.2
Republican	Ron J. Bassilian	12,020	10.8
Total votes		111,138	100.0

=== General election ===
==== Predictions ====
Source	Ranking	As of
The Cook Political Report	Safe D	November 5, 2018
Inside Elections	Safe D	November 5, 2018
Sabato's Crystal Ball	Safe D	November 5, 2018
RealClearPolitics	Safe D	November 5, 2018
Daily Kos	Safe D	November 5, 2018
538	Safe D	November 7, 2018
CNN	Safe D	October 31, 2018
Politico	Safe D	November 4, 2018

==== Endorsements ====
Karen Bass (D)

Organizations

- J Street PAC

==== Results ====
California's 37th congressional district election, 2018
Party	Candidate	Votes	%
Democratic	Karen Bass (incumbent)	210,555	89.1
Republican	Ron J. Bassilian	25,823	10.9
Total votes		236,378	100.0
Democratic hold			

== District 38 ==
2018 California's 38th congressional district election
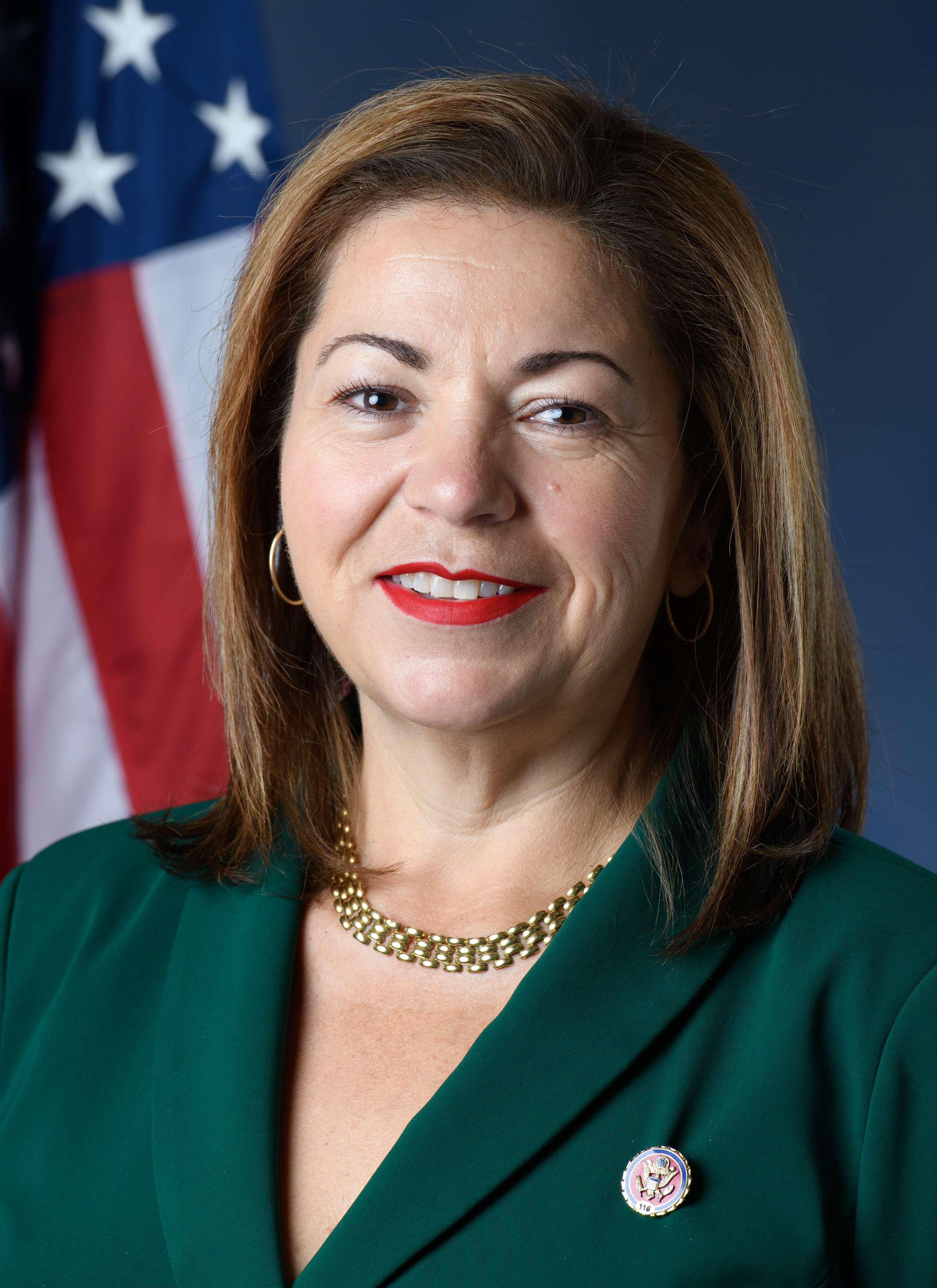

Nominee	Linda Sánchez	Ryan Downing
Party	Democratic	Republican
Popular vote	139,188	62,968
Percentage	68.9%	31.1%
- County results T. Sánchez: 50–60% 60–70%
U.S. Representative before election
Linda Sánchez
Democratic
Elected U.S. Representative
Linda Sánchez
Democratic

The 38th district is based in the eastern Los Angeles suburbs and includes Norwalk and Whittier. Incumbent Democrat Linda Sánchez, who had represented the 38th district since 2013 and previously represented the 39th district from 2003 to 2013, ran for re-election. She was re-elected with 70.5% of the vote in 2016. The district had a PVI of D+17.

=== Primary election ===
==== Democratic candidates ====
===== Advanced to general =====
- Linda Sánchez, incumbent U.S. representative

==== Republican candidates ====
===== Advanced to general =====
- Ryan Downing, taxpayer advocate and general election candidate for this seat in 2016

==== Results ====
Nonpartisan blanket primary results
Party	Candidate	Votes	%
Democratic	Linda Sánchez (incumbent)	54,691	62.7
Republican	Ryan Downing	32,584	37.3
Total votes		87,275	100.0

=== General election ===
==== Predictions ====
Source	Ranking	As of
The Cook Political Report	Safe D	November 5, 2018
Inside Elections	Safe D	November 5, 2018
Sabato's Crystal Ball	Safe D	November 5, 2018
RealClearPolitics	Safe D	November 5, 2018
Daily Kos	Safe D	November 5, 2018
538	Safe D	November 7, 2018
CNN	Safe D	October 31, 2018
Politico	Safe D	November 4, 2018

==== Endorsements ====
Linda Sánchez (D)

Organizations

- J Street PAC

==== Results ====
California's 38th congressional district election, 2018
Party	Candidate	Votes	%
Democratic	Linda Sánchez (incumbent)	139,188	68.9
Republican	Ryan Downing	62,968	31.1
Total votes		202,156	100.0
Democratic hold			

== District 39 ==
2018 California's 39th congressional district election
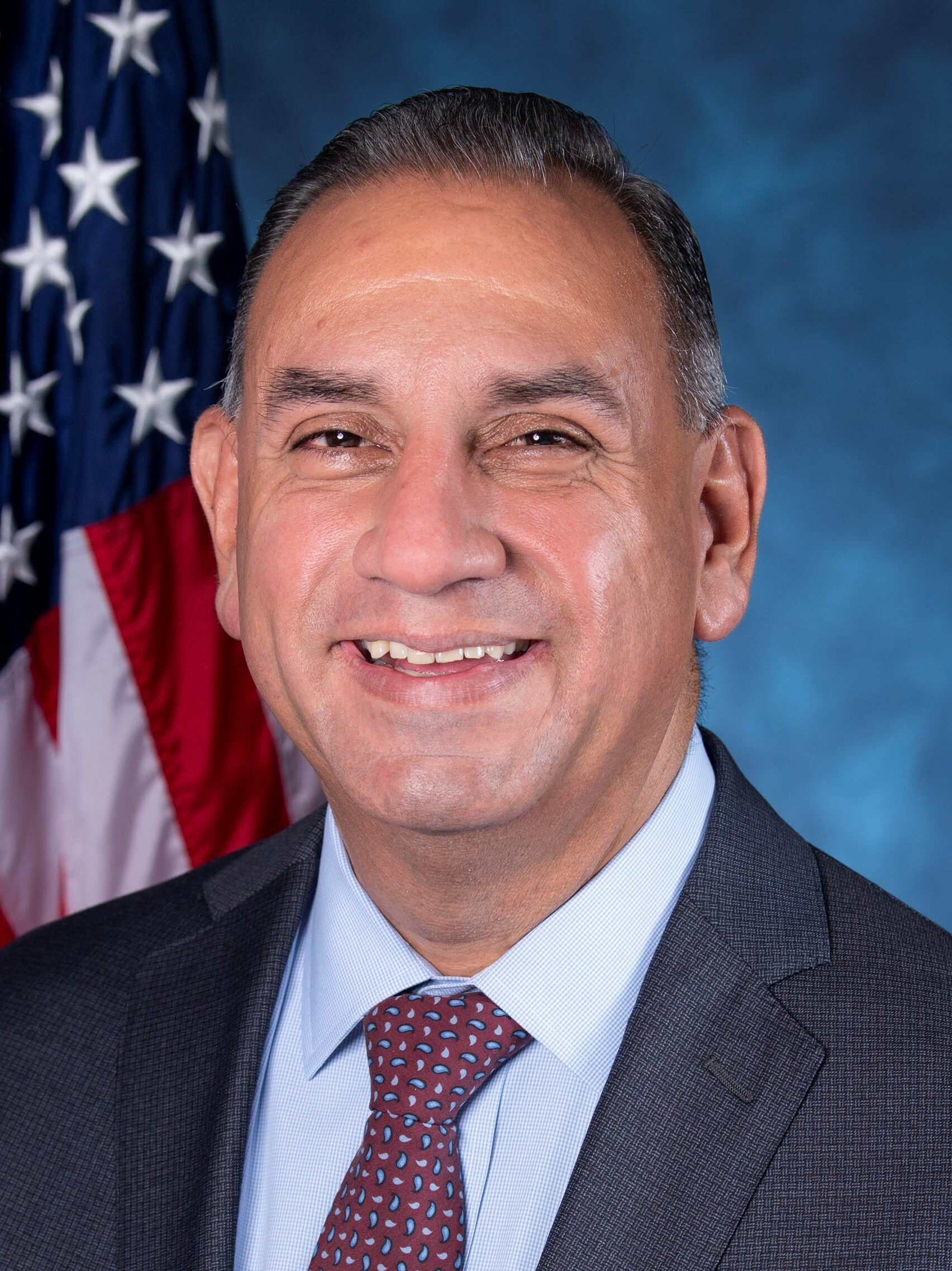

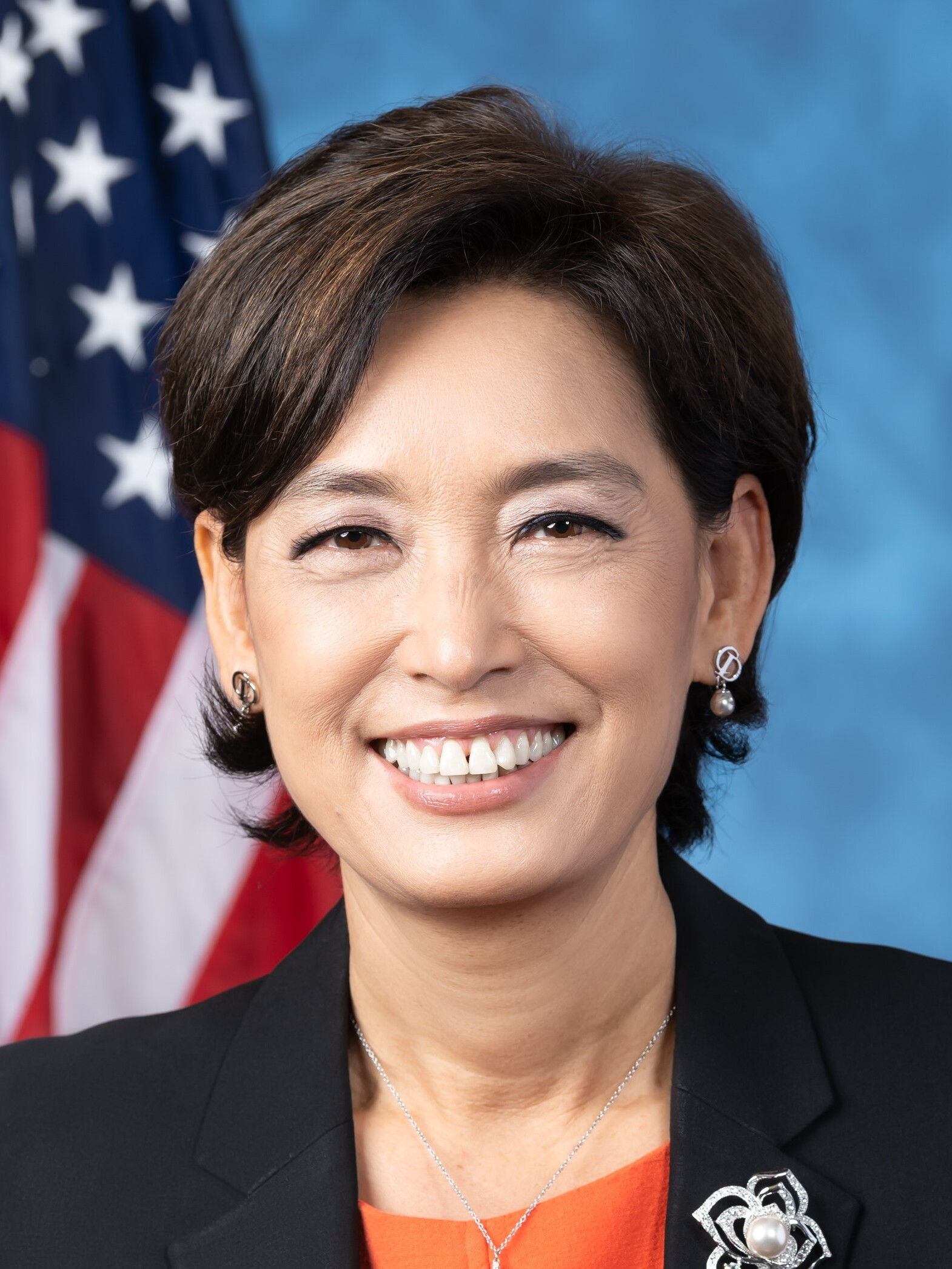
Candidate	Gil Cisneros	Young Kim
Party	Democratic	Republican
Popular vote	126,002	118,391
Percentage	51.6%	48.4%
- County results Cisneros: 50–60% Kim: 50–60%
U.S. Representative before election
Ed Royce
Republican
Elected U.S. Representative
Gil Cisneros
Democratic

The 39th district straddles the Los Angeles–Orange–San Bernardino tri-county border and includes Chino Hills, Diamond Bar, and Fullerton. Incumbent Republican Ed Royce, who had represented the 39th district since 2013 and had represented the 40th district from 2003 to 2013 and the 39th district from 1993 to 2003, retired. He was re-elected with 57.6% of the vote in 2016. The district had a PVI of Even.

=== Primary election ===
==== Republican candidates ====
===== Advanced to general =====
- Young Kim, former state assembly member

===== Eliminated in primary =====
- John Cullum, business owner and accountant
- Bob Huff, former state senate minority leader
- Shawn Nelson, Orange County Supervisor
- Andrew Sarega, La Mirada city council member
- Steve Vargas, Brea city council member

===== Declined =====
- Ed Royce, incumbent U.S. representative

==== Democratic candidates ====
===== Advanced to general =====
- Gil Cisneros, Navy veteran

===== Eliminated in primary =====
- Sam Jammal, former Obama official under USDC
- Phil Janowicz, retired professor
- Ted Rusk, contractor
- Andy Thorburn, health insurance executive
- Mai Khanh Tran, pediatrician

===== Withdrawn =====
- Jay Chen, Mt. San Antonio College board member
- Phil Janowicz
- Ted Rusk
- Cybil Steed

==== American Independent candidates ====
===== Eliminated in primary =====
- Ted Alemayhu, social entrepreneur
- Sophia Alexander

==== Independent candidates ====
===== Eliminated in primary =====
- Steve Cox, Marine veteran
- Karen Schatzle, deputy district attorney

===== Withdrawn =====
- Julio Castañeda

==== Endorsements ====
See main article for details.

==== Polling ====
Poll source	Date(s) administered	Sample size	Margin of error	Gil Cisneros (D)	Steve Cox (NPP)	Bob Huff (R)	Sam Jammal (D)	Young Kim (R)	Shawn Nelson (R)	Andy Thorburn (D)	Mai-Khanh Tran (D)	Steve Vargas (R)	Other	Undecided
Tulchin Research (D-Cisneros)	May 16–20, 2018	500	± 4.4%	20%	–	14%	7%	14%	8%	11%	5%	6%	1%	15%
Mellman Group (D-Thorburn)	March 30 – April 7, 2018	400	± 4.9%	11%	–	10%	4%	13%	10%	11%	6%	–	–	35%
Tulchin Research (D–Cisneros)	March 18–25, 2018	700	± 3.7%	19%	–	12%	4%	11%	13%	10%	6%	2%	3%	20%
Change Research (D)	March 4–8, 2018	680	—	16%	–	19%	–	22%	9%	16%	6%	–	11% (Note: Jay Chen* (D) 7%, Other 4%. *Withdrawn.)	–
Change Research (D)	March 4–8, 2018	680	—	10%	5%	12%	5%	15%	6%	8%	4%	7%	33% (Note: Jay Chen* (D) 5%; Phil Janowicz* (D) 4%; John Cullum (R) 3%; Camilla Kuo Liou* (D) and Andrew Sarega (R) with 2%; Ted Alemayhu (AIP), Sophia Alexander (AIP), Mark Gaouette* (R), Melissa Garza* (NPP), Herbert Lee (D), Suzi Park Leggett (D), Phil Liberatore (R), Ted Rusk* (D), and Nathan Troutman* (D) with 1%; Karen Lee Schatzle (NPP) and Cybil Steed* (D) with 0%; Other 8%. *Withdrawn)	–

==== Results ====
Results by county: Kim—20–30% Cisneros—20–30% Liberatore—20–30%

Nonpartisan blanket primary results
Party	Candidate	Votes	%
Republican	Young Kim	30,019	21.2
Democratic	Gil Cisneros	27,469	19.4
Republican	Phil Liberatore	20,257	14.3
Democratic	Andy Thorburn	12,990	9.2
Republican	Shawn Nelson	9,750	6.9
Republican	Bob Huff	8,699	6.2
Democratic	Sam Jammal	7,613	5.4
Democratic	Mai-Khanh Tran	7,430	5.3
Democratic	Herbert H. Lee	5,988	4.2
Republican	Steven C. Vargas	4,144	2.9
Democratic	Suzi Park Leggett	2,058	1.5
Republican	John J. Cullum	1,747	1.2
No party preference	Karen Lee Schatzle	903	0.6
No party preference	Steve Cox	856	0.6
Republican	Andrew Sarega	823	0.6
American Independent	Sophia J. Alexander	523	0.4
American Independent	Ted Alemayhu	176	0.1
Total votes		141,445	100.0

=== General election ===
==== Endorsements ====
Young Kim (R)

U.S. executive branch officials

- Rosario Marin, former Treasurer of the United States

U.S. representatives

- Ed Royce (R-CA-39)
- Mimi Walters (R-CA-45)

State legislators

- Jordan Cunningham, assemblyman
- James Gallagher, assemblyman
- David Hadley, former assemblyman
- Tom Lackey, assemblyman
- Bob Pacheco, former assemblyman
- Jim Patterson, assemblyman
- Jim Silva, former assemblyman/supervisor

Organizations

- National Association of Women Business Owners
- National Republican Congressional Committee "Young Guns" Program
- Republican Party of Orange County

Local officials

- Michael Antonovich, retired LA County supervisor
- Cynthia Coad, former supervisor, OC Board of Supervisors
- Sandra Hutchens, OC sheriff
- Tony Rackauckas, Orange County DA
- Michelle Steel, OC Board of Supervisors
Gil Cisneros (D)

U.S. executive branch officials

- Arne Duncan, former Secretary of Education

U.S. representatives

- Pete Aguilar (D-CA-31)
- Nanette Barragán (D-CA-44)
- Salud Carbajal (D-CA-24)
- Judy Chu (D-CA-27)
- Lou Correa (D-CA-46)
- Grace Napolitano (D-CA-32)
- Lucille Roybal-Allard (D-CA-40)
- Raul Ruiz (D-CA-36)
- Linda Sánchez (D-CA-38)
- Loretta Sanchez, former congresswoman
- Norma Torres (D-CA-35)

State legislators

- Chris Holden (D-41)
- Sharon Quirk-Silva (D-65)
- Blanca Rubio (D-48)

Labor unions

- Service Employees International Union
- United Steelworkers

Organizations

- Democratic Congressional Campaign Committee "Red to Blue" Program
- End Citizens United
- Giffords
- J Street PAC
- League of Conservation Voters
- Sierra Club
- Vote Vets

==== Debates ====
- Complete video of debate, October 16, 2018

==== Polling ====
Poll source	Date(s) administered	Sample size	Margin of error	Young Kim (R)	Gil Cisneros (D)	Undecided
NYT Upshot/Siena College	October 18–23, 2018	496	± 4.6%	46%	47%	7%
Tulchin Research (D-Cisneros)	September 28 – October 2, 2018	400	± 4.9%	47%	48%	4%
UC Berkeley	September 16–23, 2018	552	± 6.0%	48%	49%	3%
Monmouth University	September 13–16, 2018	300 LV	± 5.7%	51%	41%	8%
Monmouth University	September 13–16, 2018	402 RV	± 4.9%	46%	42%	12%
Tulchin Research (D-Cisneros)	August 1–6, 2018	600	± 4.0%	42%	53%	5%
DCCC (D)	June 10, 2018	–	–	45%	43%	12%
Remington (R)	January 10–11, 2018	761	± 3.5%	41%	38%	21%

==== Predictions ====
Source	Ranking	As of
The Cook Political Report	Tossup	November 5, 2018
Inside Elections	Tossup	November 5, 2018
Sabato's Crystal Ball	Lean R	November 5, 2018
RCP	Tossup	November 5, 2018
Daily Kos	Tossup	November 5, 2018
538	Tossup	November 7, 2018
CNN	Tossup	October 31, 2018
Politico	Tossup	November 4, 2018

==== Results ====
California's 39th congressional district election, 2018
Party	Candidate	Votes	%
Democratic	Gil Cisneros	126,002	51.6
Republican	Young Kim	118,391	48.4
Majority		7,611	3.2
Total votes		244,393	100.0
Democratic gain from Republican			

== District 40 ==
2018 California's 40th congressional district election
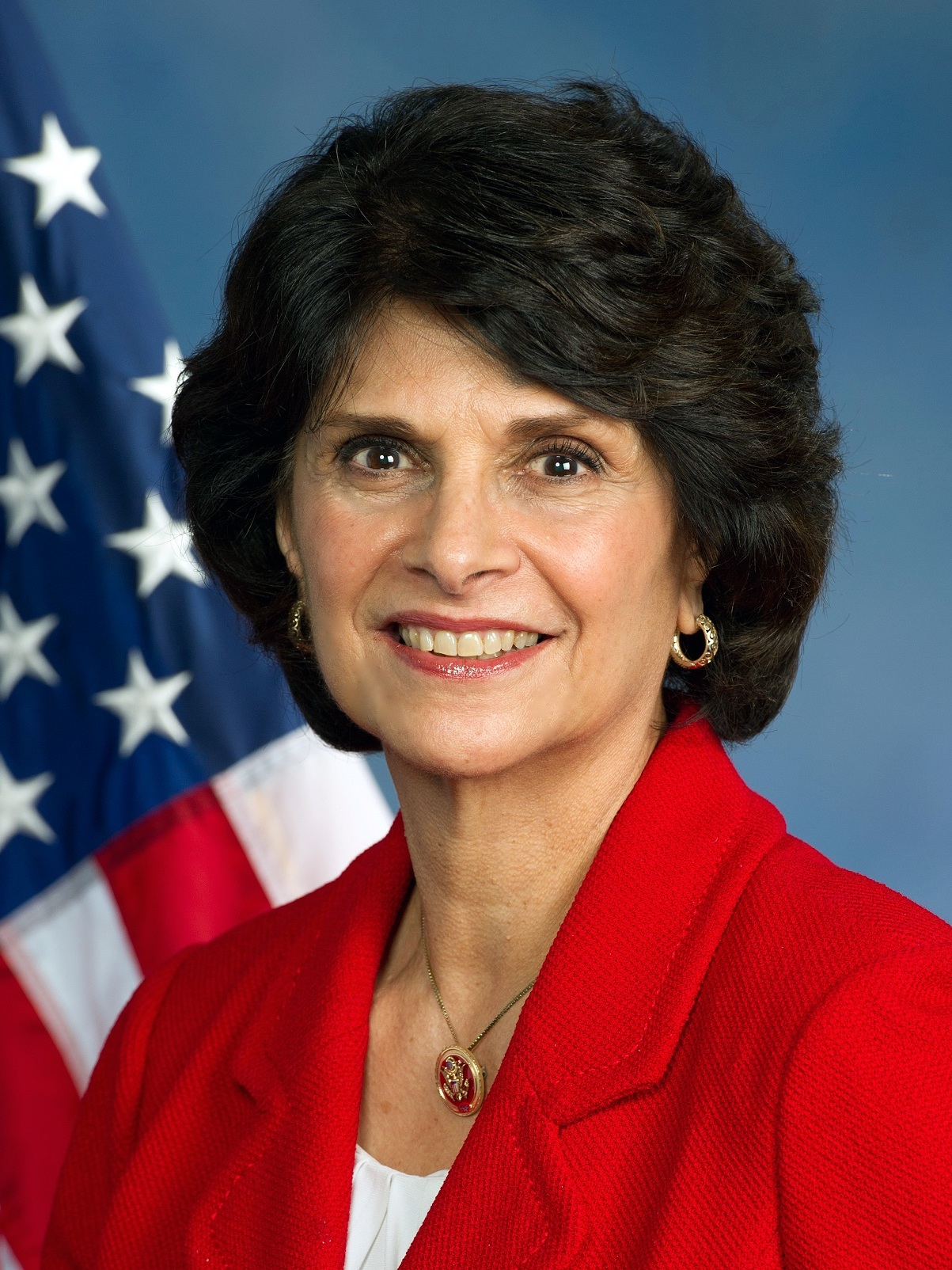

Nominee	Lucille Roybal-Allard	Rodolfo Cortes Barragan
Party	Democratic	Green
Popular vote	93,938	27,511
Percentage	77.3%	22.7%
- County results Roybal-allard: 70–80%
U.S. Representative before election
Lucille Roybal-Allard
Democratic
Elected U.S. Representative
Lucille Roybal-Allard
Democratic

The 40th district is based in central Los Angeles County and includes Downey and East Los Angeles. Incumbent Democrat Lucille Roybal-Allard, who had represented the 40th district since 2013 and previously represented the 34th district from 2003 to 2013 and the 33rd district from 1993 to 2003, ran for re-election. She was re-elected with 71.4% of the vote in 2016. The district had a PVI of D+33.

=== Primary election ===
==== Democratic candidates ====
===== Advanced to general =====
- Lucille Roybal-Allard, incumbent U.S. representative

==== Green candidates ====
===== Advanced to general =====
- Rodolfo Cortes Barragan

==== Results ====
Nonpartisan blanket primary results
Party	Candidate	Votes	%
Democratic	Lucille Roybal-Allard (incumbent)	35,636	80.3
Green	Rodolfo Cortes Barragan	8,741	19.7
Total votes		44,377	100.0

=== General election ===
==== Predictions ====
Source	Ranking	As of
The Cook Political Report	Safe D	November 5, 2018
Inside Elections	Safe D	November 5, 2018
Sabato's Crystal Ball	Safe D	November 5, 2018
RealClearPolitics	Safe D	November 5, 2018
Daily Kos	Safe D	November 5, 2018
538	Safe D	November 7, 2018
CNN	Safe D	October 31, 2018
Politico	Safe D	November 4, 2018

==== Endorsements ====
Rodolfo Cortes-Barragan (G)

Organizations

- Peace and Freedom Party

==== Results ====
California's 40th congressional district election, 2018
Party	Candidate	Votes	%
Democratic	Lucille Roybal-Allard (incumbent)	93,938	77.3
Green	Rodolfo Cortes Barragan	27,511	22.7
Total votes		121,449	100.0
Democratic hold			

== District 41 ==
2018 California's 41st congressional district election
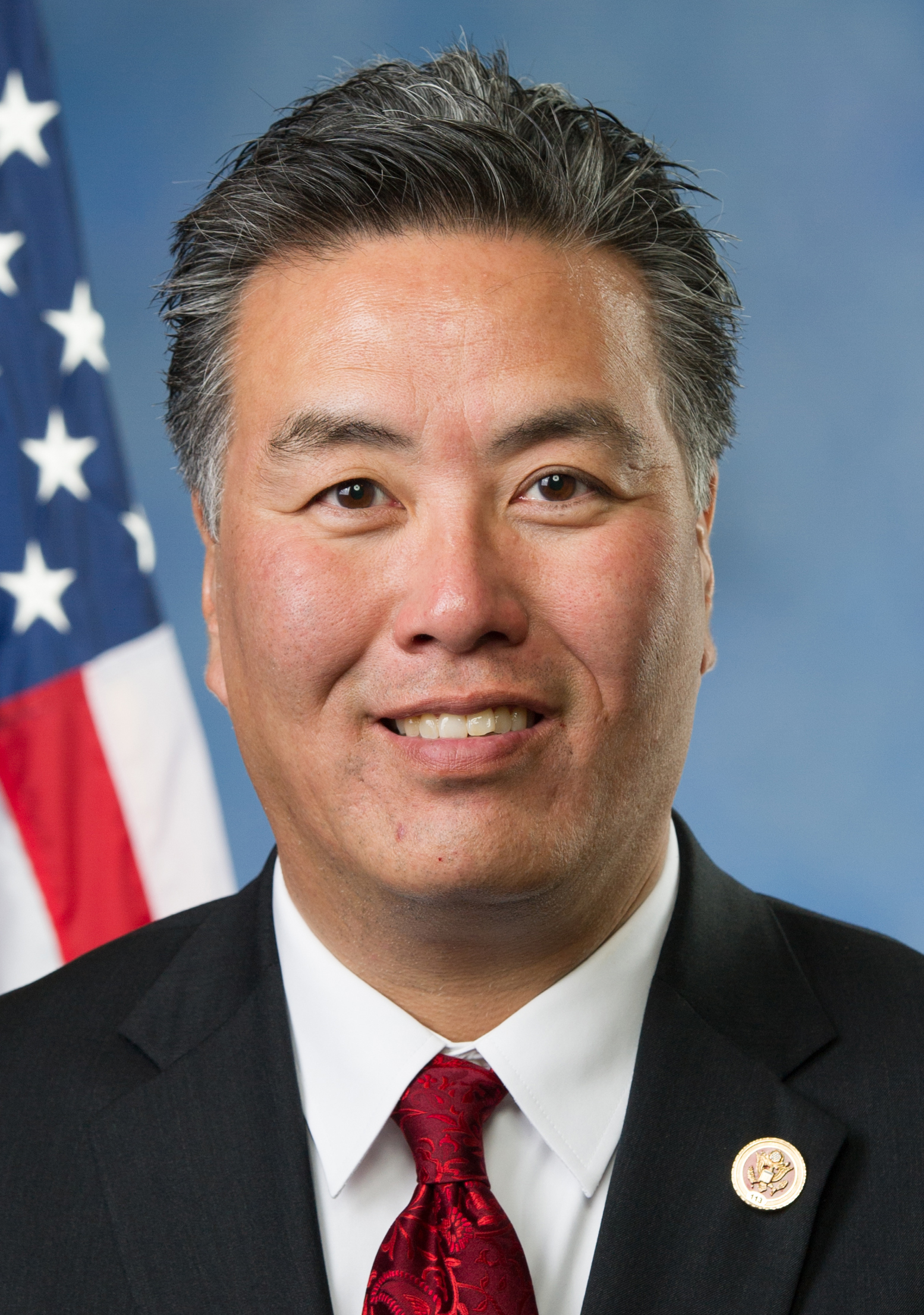

Nominee	Mark Takano	Aja Smith
Party	Democratic	Republican
Popular vote	108,227	58,021
Percentage	65.1%	34.9%
- County results Takano: 60–70%
U.S. Representative before election
Mark Takano
Democratic
Elected U.S. Representative
Mark Takano
Democratic

The 41st district is based in the Inland Empire and includes Moreno Valley, Perris, and Riverside. Democrat Mark Takano, who had represented the 41st district since 2013, ran for re-election. He was re-elected with 65.0% of the vote in 2016. The district had a PVI of D+12.

=== Primary election ===
==== Democratic candidates ====
===== Advanced to general =====
- Mark Takano, incumbent U.S. representative

==== Republican candidates ====
===== Advanced to general =====
- Aja Smith, U.S. Air Force veteran

===== Withdrawn =====
- Doug Shepherd, realtor and general election candidate for this seat in 2016

==== Results ====
Nonpartisan blanket primary results
Party	Candidate	Votes	%
Democratic	Mark Takano (incumbent)	45,585	58.5
Republican	Aja Smith	32,360	41.5
Total votes		77,945	100.0

=== General election ===
==== Predictions ====
Source	Ranking	As of
The Cook Political Report	Safe D	November 5, 2018
Inside Elections	Safe D	November 5, 2018
Sabato's Crystal Ball	Safe D	November 5, 2018
RealClearPolitics	Safe D	November 5, 2018
Daily Kos	Safe D	November 5, 2018
538	Safe D	November 7, 2018
CNN	Safe D	October 31, 2018
Politico	Safe D	November 4, 2018

==== Endorsements ====
Mark Takano (D)

Organizations

- J Street PAC

==== Results ====
California's 41st congressional district election, 2018
Party	Candidate	Votes	%
Democratic	Mark Takano (incumbent)	108,227	65.1
Republican	Aja Smith	58,021	34.9
Total votes		166,248	100.0
Democratic hold			

== District 42 ==
2018 California's 42nd congressional district election
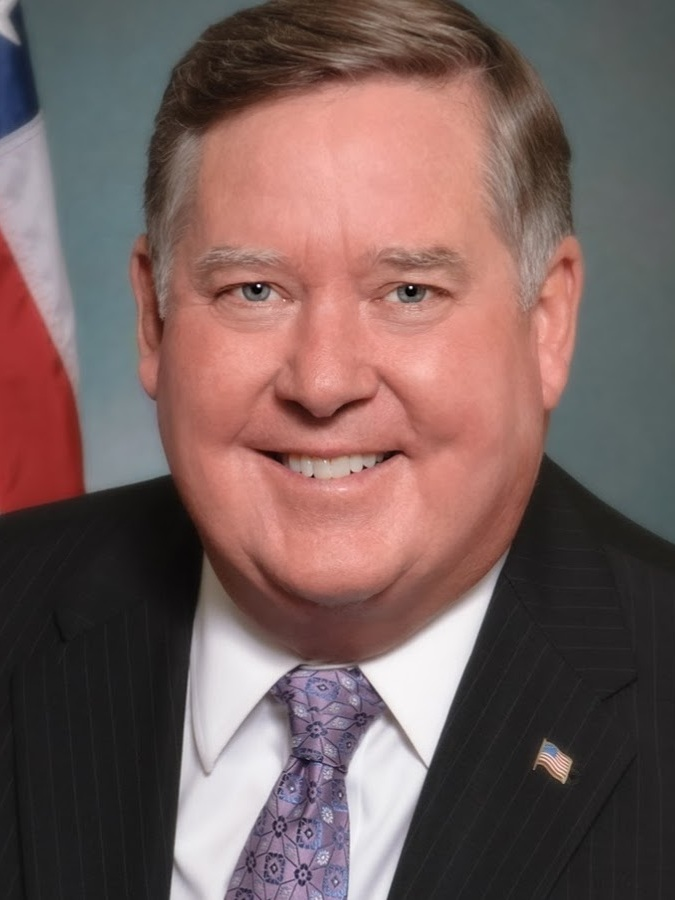

Nominee	Ken Calvert	Julia Peacock
Party	Republican	Democratic
Popular vote	131,040	100,892
Percentage	56.5%	43.5%
- County results Calvert: 50–60%
U.S. Representative before election
Ken Calvert
Republican
Elected U.S. Representative
Ken Calvert
Republican

The 42nd district is based in the Inland Empire and includes Corona and Murrieta. Incumbent Republican Ken Calvert, who had represented the 42nd district since 2013 and previously represented the 44th district from 2003 to 2013 and the 43rd district from 1993 to 2003, ran for re-election. He was re-elected with 58.8% of the vote in 2016. The district had a PVI of R+9.

=== Primary election ===
==== Republican candidates ====
===== Advanced to general =====
- Ken Calvert, incumbent U.S. representative

===== Withdrawn =====
- Floyd Harvey

==== Democratic candidates ====
===== Advanced to general =====
- Julia Peacock, high-school teacher and activist

===== Eliminated in primary =====
- Norman Quintero, pastor, psychotherapist and entrepreneur

==== Independent candidates ====
===== Eliminated in primary =====
- Matt Woody, sommelier

==== Results ====
Nonpartisan blanket primary results
Party	Candidate	Votes	%
Republican	Ken Calvert (incumbent)	70,289	60.8
Democratic	Julia C. Peacock	30,237	26.1
Democratic	Norman Quintero	9,540	8.2
No party preference	Matt Woody	5,587	4.8
Total votes		115,653	100.0

=== General election ===
==== Predictions ====
Source	Ranking	As of
The Cook Political Report	Safe R	November 5, 2018
Inside Elections	Safe R	November 5, 2018
Sabato's Crystal Ball	Safe R	November 5, 2018
RealClearPolitics	Safe R	November 5, 2018
Daily Kos	Safe R	November 5, 2018
538	Safe R	November 7, 2018
CNN	Safe R	October 31, 2018
Politico	Safe R	November 4, 2018

==== Results ====
California's 42nd congressional district election, 2018
Party	Candidate	Votes	%
Republican	Ken Calvert (incumbent)	131,040	56.5
Democratic	Julia C. Peacock	100,892	43.5
Majority		30,148	13.0
Total votes		231,932	100.0
Republican hold			

== District 43 ==
2018 California's 43rd congressional district election
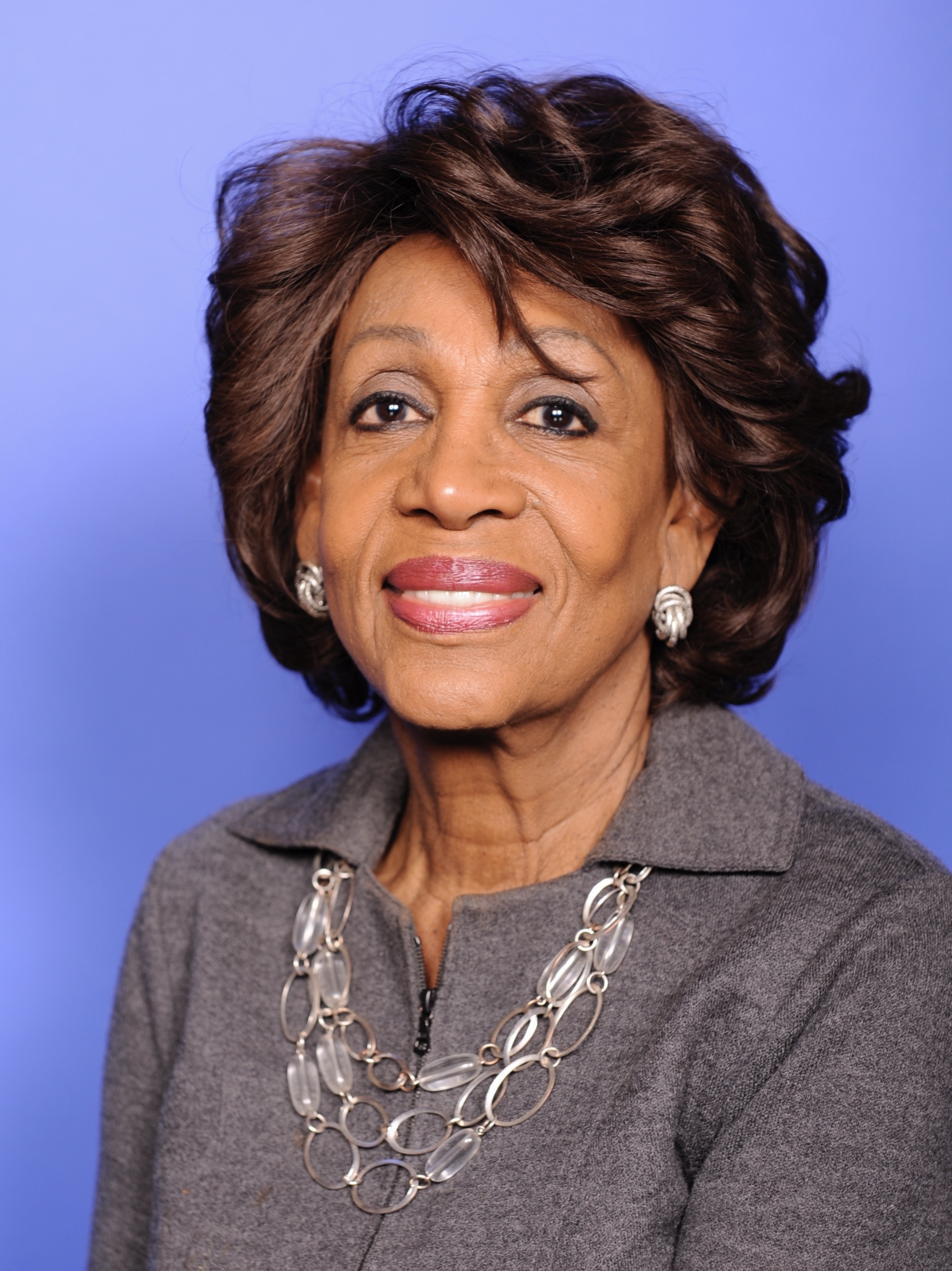

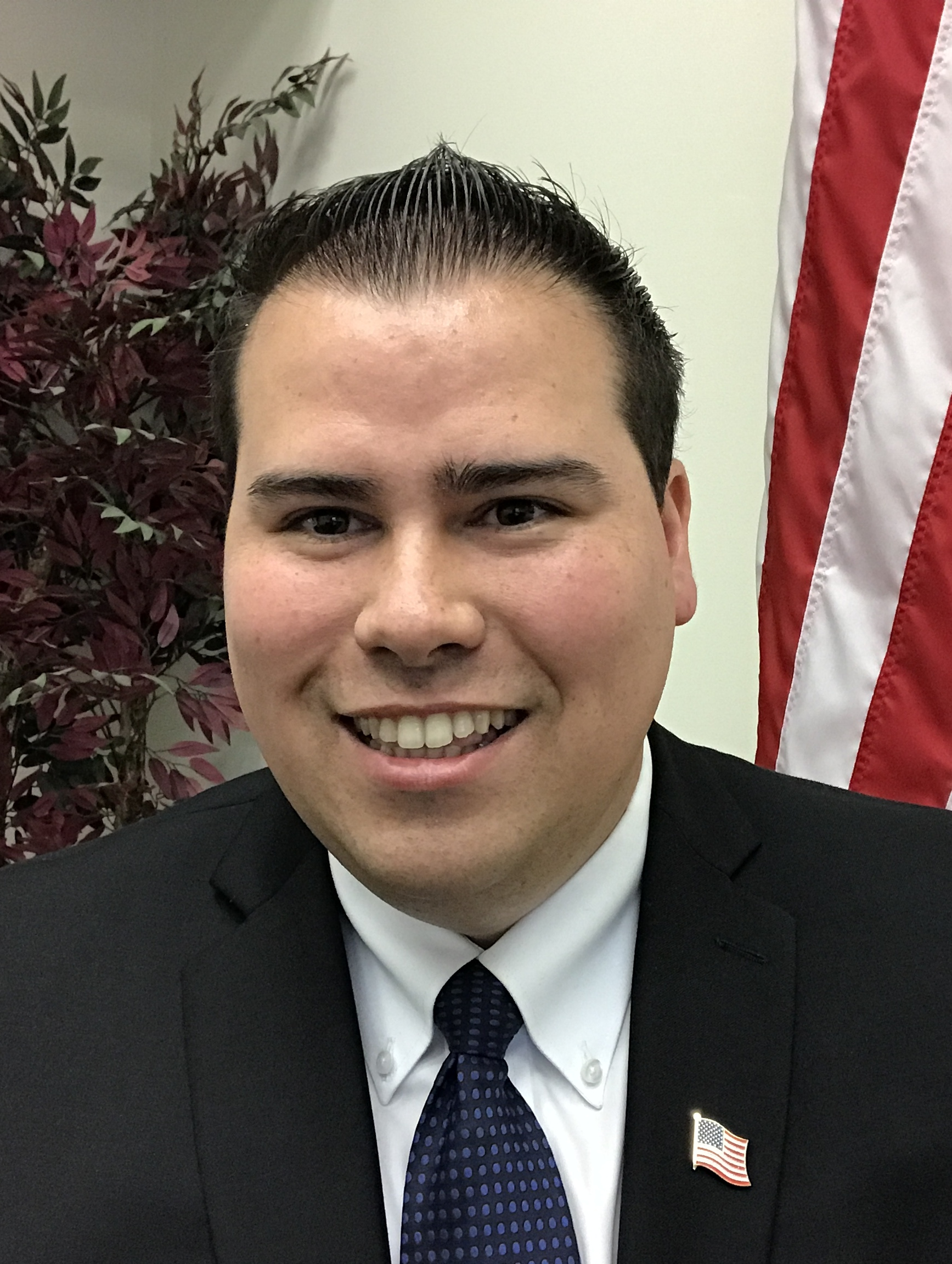
Nominee	Maxine Waters	Omar Navarro
Party	Democratic	Republican
Popular vote	152,272	43,780
Percentage	77.7%	22.3%
- County results Waters: 70–80%
U.S. Representative before election
Maxine Waters
Democratic
Elected U.S. Representative
Maxine Waters
Democratic

The 43rd district is based in South Los Angeles and includes Hawthorne and Inglewood. Incumbent Democrat Maxine Waters, who had represented the 43rd district since 2013 and previously represented the 35th district from 1993 to 2013 and the 29th district from 1991 to 1993, ran for re-election. She was re-elected with 76.1% of the vote in 2016. The district had a PVI of D+29.

=== Primary election ===
==== Democratic candidates ====
===== Advanced to general =====
- Maxine Waters, incumbent U.S. representative

==== Republican candidates ====
===== Advanced to general =====
- Omar Navarro, small business owner and general election candidate for this seat in 2016

===== Eliminated in primary =====
- Frank DeMartini, film producer and attorney
- Edwin Duterte, investment advisor

===== Withdrawn =====
- Forest Baker
- Candance Camper

==== Green candidates ====
===== Eliminated in primary =====
- Miguel Angel Zuniga, salesperson

==== Endorsements ====
Frank DeMartini (R)

U.S. representatives

- Dana Rohrabacher (R-CA-48)

Individuals

- Bradley Blakeman, Republican strategist
- Pat Boone, singer
- Bob Conti, musician
- Wink Martindale, radio disc jockey
- Chris Widener, writer
Miguel Angel Zuniga (G)

Local officials

- Gayle McLaughlin (Independent), former mayor of Richmond

==== Results ====
Nonpartisan blanket primary results
Party	Candidate	Votes	%
Democratic	Maxine Waters (incumbent)	63,908	72.3
Republican	Omar Navarro	12,522	14.2
Republican	Frank T. DeMartini	6,156	7.0
Republican	Edwin P. Duterte	3,673	4.2
Green	Miguel Angel Zuniga	2,074	2.3
Total votes		86,533	100.0

=== General election ===
==== Predictions ====
Source	Ranking	As of
The Cook Political Report	Safe D	November 5, 2018
Inside Elections	Safe D	November 5, 2018
Sabato's Crystal Ball	Safe D	November 5, 2018
RealClearPolitics	Safe D	November 5, 2018
Daily Kos	Safe D	November 5, 2018
538	Safe D	November 7, 2018
CNN	Safe D	October 31, 2018
Politico	Safe D	November 4, 2018

==== Endorsements ====
Omar Navarro (R)

U.S. representatives

- Barry Goldwater Jr., former member of the U.S. House of Representatives from California (1969–1983)

State legislators

- Joel Anderson, California state senator (R-38)
- Elbert Guillory, former member of the Louisiana State Senate (R-24)

Individuals

- Joe Arpaio, former Maricopa County, Arizona sheriff and candidate for U.S. Senate in Arizona in 2018
- Herman Cain, Republican candidate for president in 2012
- Mark Dice, media analyst and author
- Larry Elder, conservative political commentator
- Michael T. Flynn, retired United States Army lieutenant general and former National Security Advisor to President Donald Trump
- Alex Jones, conservative talk radio host and publisher as well as owner of InfoWars
- Roger Stone, political consultant
- Chuck Woolery, talk show host

==== Results ====
California's 43rd congressional district election, 2018
Party	Candidate	Votes	%
Democratic	Maxine Waters (incumbent)	152,272	77.7
Republican	Omar Navarro	43,780	22.3
Total votes		196,052	100.0
Democratic hold			

== District 44 ==
2018 California's 44th congressional district election
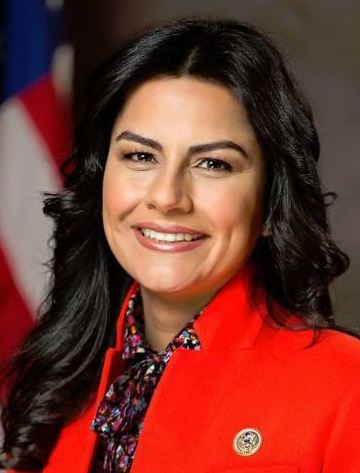

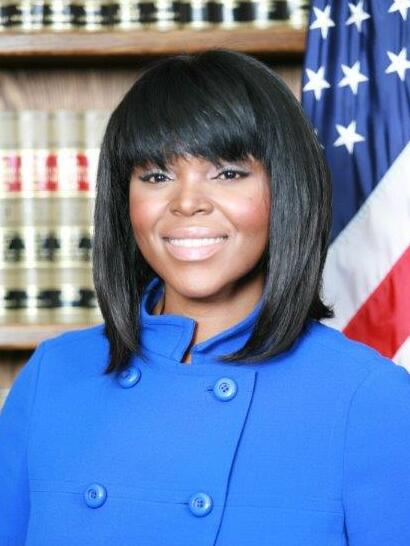
Nominee	Nanette Barragán	Aja Brown
Party	Democratic	Democratic
Popular vote	97,944	45,378
Percentage	68.3%	31.7%
U.S. Representative before election
Nanette Barragán
Democratic
Elected U.S. Representative
Nanette Barragán
Democratic

The 44th district is based in south Los Angeles County and includes Carson, Compton, and San Pedro. Incumbent Democrat Nanette Barragán, who had represented the 44th district since 2017, ran for re-election. She was elected with 52.2% of the vote in 2016. The district had a PVI of D+35.

=== Primary election ===
==== Democratic candidates ====
===== Advanced to general =====
- Nanette Barragán, incumbent U.S. representative
- Aja Brown, mayor of Compton

===== Withdrawn =====
- Isadore Hall, III, former state senator and general election candidate for this seat in 2016

==== Republican candidates ====
===== Eliminated in primary =====
- Jazmina Saavedra, businesswoman

===== Withdrawn =====
- Stacey Dash, actress

==== Independent candidates ====
===== Withdrawn =====
- Ashley Wright

==== Results ====
Nonpartisan blanket primary results
Party	Candidate	Votes	%
Democratic	Nanette Barragán (incumbent)	39,453	65.5
Democratic	Aja Brown (withdrawn)	10,257	17.0
Republican	Jazmina Saavedra	6,153	10.2
Republican	Stacey Dash (withdrawn)	4,361	7.2
Total votes		60,224	100.0

=== General election ===
==== Predictions ====
Source	Ranking	As of
The Cook Political Report	Safe D	November 5, 2018
Inside Elections	Safe D	November 5, 2018
Sabato's Crystal Ball	Safe D	November 5, 2018
RealClearPolitics	Safe D	November 5, 2018
Daily Kos	Safe D	November 5, 2018
538	Safe D	November 7, 2018
CNN	Safe D	October 31, 2018
Politico	Safe D	November 4, 2018

==== Results ====
California's 44th congressional district election, 2018
Party	Candidate	Votes	%
Democratic	Nanette Barragán (incumbent)	97,944	68.3
Democratic	Aja Brown	45,378	31.7
Total votes		143,322	100.0
Democratic hold			

== District 45 ==
2018 California's 45th congressional district election
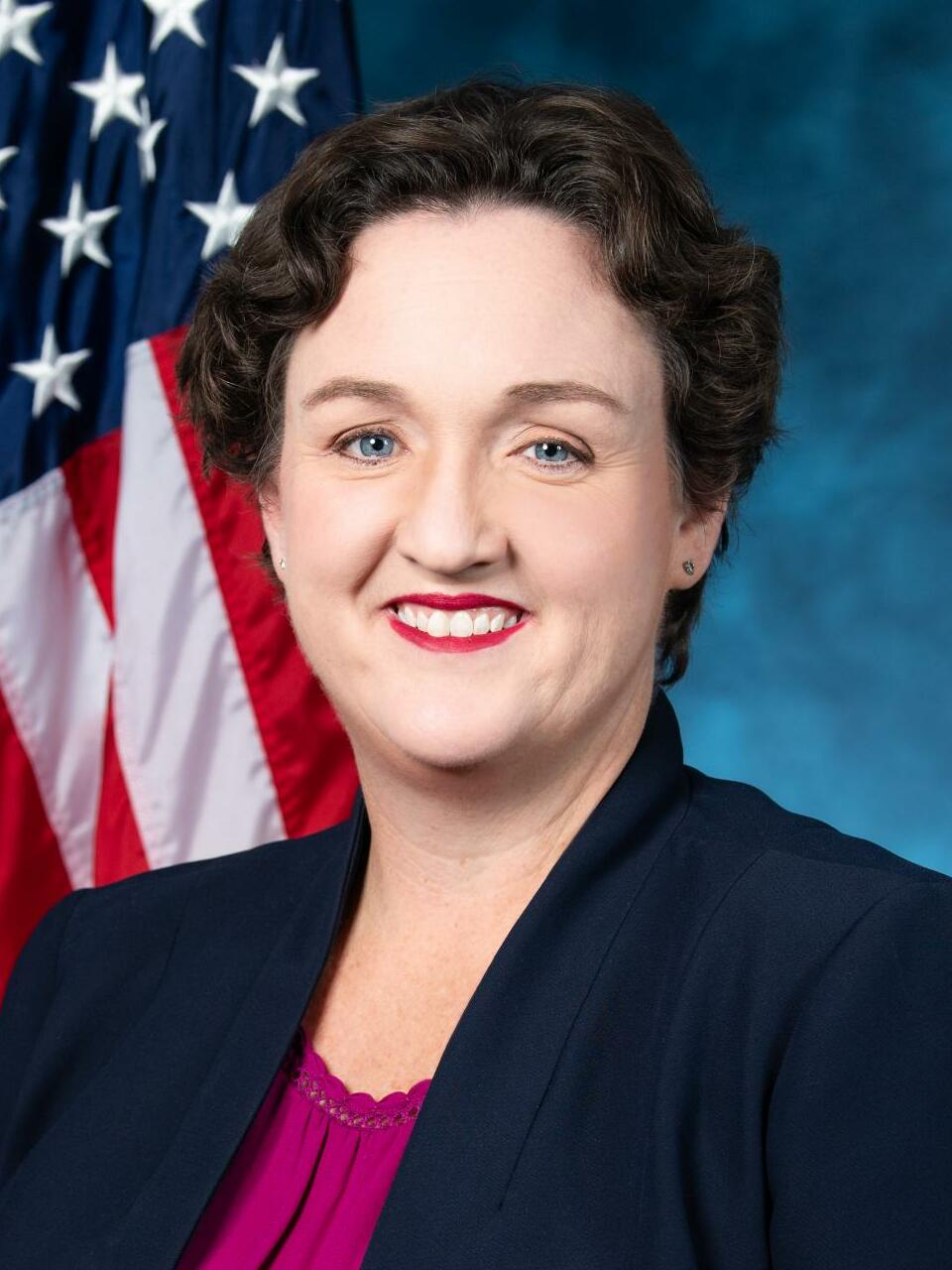

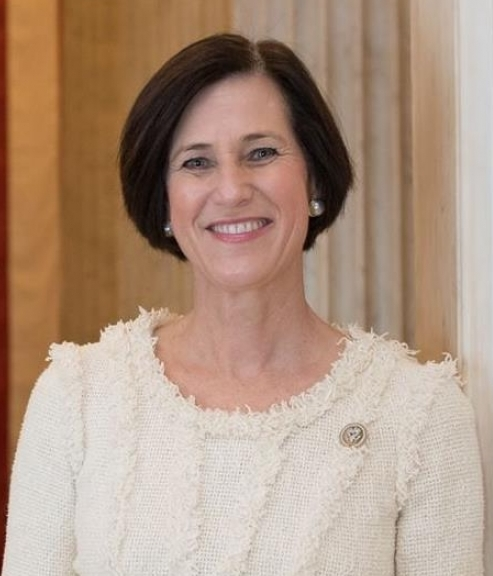
Nominee	Katie Porter	Mimi Walters
Party	Democratic	Republican
Popular vote	158,906	146,383
Percentage	52.1%	47.9%
- Porter: 50–60% 60–70% 70–80% 80–90% >90% Walters 50–60% 60–70% 70–80% No votes
U.S. Representative before election
Mimi Walters
Republican
Elected U.S. Representative
Katie Porter
Democratic

The 45th district is based in inland Orange County and includes the cities of East Anaheim, Irvine and Mission Viejo. Incumbent Republican Mimi Walters, who had represented the 45th district since 2015, ran for re-election. She was re-elected with 58.6% of the vote in 2016. The district had a PVI of R+3.

=== Primary election ===
==== Republican candidates ====
===== Advanced to general =====
- Mimi Walters, incumbent U.S. representative

===== Declined =====
- Greg Raths, mayor pro tempore of Mission Viejo
- Rob Schneiderman, union president

==== Democratic candidates ====
California's 45th district was included on the list of Republican-held seats being targeted by the Democratic Congressional Campaign Committee in 2018. On February 25, Dave Min received the endorsement of the California Democratic Party at the party convention in San Diego.

===== Advanced to general =====
- Katie Porter, law professor

===== Eliminated in primary =====
- Brian Forde, former White House technology adviser
- Kia Hamadanchy, former aide to Sen. Sherrod Brown
- Dave Min, law professor and former aide to Sen. Chuck Schumer

===== Withdrawn =====
- Greg Ramsay, ice cream shop owner
- Eric Rywalski, business affairs consultant
- Ron Varasteh, small business owner and general election candidate for this seat in 2016

==== Independent candidates ====
===== Eliminated in primary =====
- John Graham, retired business professor

==== Endorsements ====
Brian Forde (D)

Organizations

- Orange County Young Democrats
Kia Hamadanchy (D)

U.S. senators

- Sherrod Brown, U.S. senator from Ohio
- Tom Harkin, former U.S. senator from Iowa

U.S. representatives

- Mike Honda, former congressman

State officials

- Cyrus Habib, lieutenant governor of Washington

State legislators

- Warren Furutani, former assemblyman

Organizations

- Bay Area Iranian-American Democrats
- Freethought Equality Fund
- Iranian American Political Action Committee
- National Iranian American Council (NIAC Action)
- The Pluralism Project

Local officials

- Amir Farokhi, Atlanta, Georgia city councilman
- Suzie Price, Long Beach city councilwoman
Dave Min (D)

U.S. representatives

- Pete Aguilar, U.S. representative (D-CA-31)
- Ami Bera, U.S. representative (D-CA-7)
- Salud Carbajal, U.S. representative (D-CA-24)
- Judy Chu, U.S. representative (D-CA-27)
- Lou Correa, U.S. representative (D-CA-46)
- Alan Lowenthal, U.S. representative (D-CA-47)
- Grace Napolitano, U.S. representative (D-CA-32)
- Scott Peters, U.S. representative (D-CA-52)
- Linda Sanchez, U.S. representative (D-CA-38)
- Mark Takano, U.S. representative (D-CA-41)

State officials

- Mike Eng, former assemblyman and former mayor of Monterey Park
- Fiona Ma, California Board of Equalization member (D-2) and former assemblywoman
- Sharon Quirk-Silva, California state assemblymember (D-65)
- Betty Yee, California state controller

Labor unions

- Teamsters Joint Council 42

Organizations

- AAAFund
- ASPIRE PAC
- California Democratic Party
- College Democrats at UCI
- Congressional Hispanic Caucus Bold PAC
- Korean American Democratic Committee
- New Democrat Coalition

Local officials

- Valerie Amezcua, Santa Ana Unified School District Board of Education vice president
- Ross Chun, Aliso Viejo mayor pro tempore
- Katrina Foley, Costa Mesa city councilwoman
- Mary Ann Gaido, former Irvine city councilwoman
- Sukhee Kang, former mayor of Irvine
- David Lau, former mayor of Monterey Park
- John Palacio, Santa Ana Unified School District board of education president
- Andrew Rodriguez, Walnut city councilman
- Jesus Silva, Fullerton city councilman
- Ali Taj, mayor of Artesia

Individuals

- Julia Peacock, teacher and candidate for CA-42 in 2018
- Fran Sdao, chair of the Democratic Party of Orange County

==== Polling ====
Poll source	Date(s) administered	Sample size	Margin of error	Kia Hamadanchy (D)	Brian Forde (D)	Dave Min (D)	Katie Porter (D)	Mimi Walters (R)	Undecided
Public Policy Polling (D-Porter)	February 20–21, 2018	648	± 3.9%	6%	4%	12%	16%	42%	21%

==== Results ====
Results by county supervisorial district: Walters—50–60% Walters—40–50% No votes

Nonpartisan blanket primary results
Party	Candidate	Votes	%
Republican	Mimi Walters (incumbent)	86,764	51.7
Democratic	Katie Porter	34,078	20.3
Democratic	Dave Min	29,979	17.8
Democratic	Brian Forde	10,107	6.0
No party preference	John Graham	3,817	2.3
Democratic	Kia Hamadanchy	3,212	1.9
Total votes		167,957	100.0

=== General election ===
==== Endorsements ====
Mimi Walters (R)

Organizations

- Republican Party of Orange County
Katie Porter (D)

U.S. executive branch officials

- Barack Obama, 44th president of the United States

State officials

- Gavin Newsom, lieutenant governor of California and nominee for governor in 2018

U.S. senators

- Kamala Harris, U.S. senator from California
- Elizabeth Warren, senator from Massachusetts

U.S. representatives

- Lois Frankel, U.S. representative from Florida (D-FL-21)
- Loretta Sanchez, former congresswoman from California

State legislators

- Connie Leyva (D-20)

Organizations

- Brady Campaign to Prevent Gun Violence
- Congressional Progressive Caucus
- Council for a Livable World
- Democracy for America
- Democratic Congressional Campaign Committee "Red to Blue" Program
- EMILY's List
- End Citizens United
- Feminist Majority Foundation
- Human Rights Campaign
- J Street PAC
- League of Conservation Voters
- NARAL Pro-Choice America
- Ocean Champions
- Planned Parenthood Action Fund
- Progressive Change Campaign Committee
- Sierra Club
- Women's Political Committee

==== Polling ====
Poll source	Date(s) administered	Sample size	Margin of error	Mimi Walters (R)	Katie Porter (D)	Undecided
NYT Upshot/Siena College	October 26 – November 1, 2018	499	± 4.6%	46%	48%	6%
Public Opinion Strategies (R-Walters)	October 14–17, 2018	400	± 4.9%	50%	46%	4%
NYT Upshot/Siena College	September 21–25, 2018	518	± 4.5%	43%	48%	8%
GBA Strategies (D)	September 20–23, 2018	400	± 4.9%	47%	48%	5%
UC Berkeley	September 16–23, 2018	519	± 6.0%	45%	52%	3%
Global Strategy Group (D-Porter)	September 14–18, 2018	500	± 4.4%	43%	46%	11%
Tulchin Research (D)	August 10–14, 2018	500	± 4.38%	46%	49%	5%
Global Strategy Group (D-Porter)	July 26–31, 2018	500	± 4.4%	45%	44%	11%
Public Policy Polling (D-Porter)	May 10–12, 2018	599	–	43%	46%	11%
Public Policy Polling (D-Porter)	February 20–21, 2018	648	± 3.9%	44%	46%	10%

Hypothetical polling

Poll source	Date(s) administered	Sample size	Margin of error	Mimi Walters (R)	Dave Min (D)	Undecided
PPP/Bold Progressives	February 20–21, 2018	648	± 3.9%	44%	45%	11%

Poll source	Date(s) administered	Sample size	Margin of error	Mimi Walters (R)	Democratic opponent (D)	Undecided
PPP/Patriot Majority USA	December 12–13, 2017	—	—	41%	45%	14%

==== Predictions ====
Source	Ranking	As of
The Cook Political Report	Tossup	November 5, 2018
Inside Elections	Tossup	November 5, 2018
Sabato's Crystal Ball	Lean D (flip)	November 5, 2018
RCP	Tossup	November 5, 2018
Daily Kos	Tossup	November 5, 2018
538	Lean D (flip)	November 7, 2018
CNN	Tossup	October 31, 2018
Politico	Tossup	November 4, 2018

==== Results ====
California's 45th congressional district election, 2018
Party	Candidate	Votes	%
Democratic	Katie Porter	158,906	52.1
Republican	Mimi Walters (incumbent)	146,383	47.9
Majority		12,523	4.2
Total votes		305,289	100.0
Democratic gain from Republican			

General election results by county supervisorial district

Blue represents county supervisorial districts won by Porter. Red represents county supervisorial districts won by Walters. Gray represents county supervisorial districts with no data.

General election results by county supervisorial district
County	Porter (D)		Walters (R)		Total
County	Votes	%	Votes	%	Votes
District 1	0	0.0%	0	0.0%	0
District 3	94,652	55.5%	75,877	44.5%	170,529
District 5	64,254	47.7%	70,506	52.3%	134,760
Totals	158,906	52.1%	146,383	47.9%	305,289

== District 46 ==
2018 California's 46th congressional district election
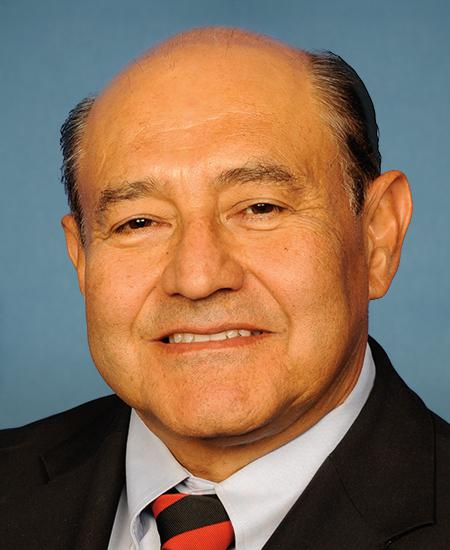

Nominee	Lou Correa	Russell Rene Lambert
Party	Democratic	Republican
Popular vote	102,278	45,638
Percentage	69.1%	30.9%
- Correa—70–80% Correa—60–70% Correa—50–60%
U.S. Representative before election
Lou Correa
Democratic
Elected U.S. Representative
Lou Correa
Democratic

The 46th district is based in central Orange County and includes Anaheim and Santa Ana. Incumbent Democrat Lou Correa, who had represented the 46th district since 2017, ran for re-election. He was elected with 70.0% of the vote in 2016. The district had a PVI of D+15.

=== Primary election ===
==== Democratic candidates ====
===== Advanced to general =====
- Lou Correa, incumbent U.S. representative

===== Withdrawn =====
- Alan Schlar

==== Republican candidates ====
===== Advanced to general =====
- Russell Rene Lambert, fraud investigator and businessman

===== Withdrawn =====
- Ben Garrett
- Jeffrey Johnston
- Adam Orozco
- Maria Slater
- David Tran

==== Independent candidates ====
===== Eliminated in primary =====
- Will Johnson, driver and caregiver
- Ed Rushman, IT project manager

==== Endorsements ====
Ed Rushman (NPP)

Organizations

- American Solidarity Party of California

==== Results ====
Results by county supervisorial district: Correa—60–70% Correa—40–50%

Nonpartisan blanket primary results
Party	Candidate	Votes	%
Democratic	Lou Correa (incumbent)	43,700	62.2
Republican	Russell Rene Lambert	22,770	32.4
No party preference	Ed Rushman	2,313	3.3
No party preference	Will Johnson	1,425	2.0
Total votes		70,208	100.0

=== General election ===
==== Predictions ====
Source	Ranking	As of
The Cook Political Report	Safe D	November 5, 2018
Inside Elections	Safe D	November 5, 2018
Sabato's Crystal Ball	Safe D	November 5, 2018
RealClearPolitics	Safe D	November 5, 2018
Daily Kos	Safe D	November 5, 2018
538	Safe D	November 7, 2018
CNN	Safe D	October 31, 2018
Politico	Safe D	November 4, 2018

==== Endorsements ====
Lou Correa (D)

U.S. representatives

- Pete Aguilar (D-CA-31)
- Karen Bass (D-CA-37)
- Tony Cárdenas (D-CA-29)
- Judy Chu (D-CA-27)
- Ruben Gallego (D-AZ-7)
- Raúl Grijalva (D-AZ-3)
- Luis Gutierrez (D-IL-4)
- Ruben Hinojosa, former U.S. representative from Texas
- Steny Hoyer, House Minority Whip (D-MD-5)
- Ted Lieu (D-CA-33)
- Alan Lowenthal (D-CA-47)
- Nancy Pelosi, House Minority Leader (D-CA-12)
- Lucille Roybal-Allard (D-CA-40)
- Raul Ruiz (D-CA-36)
- Linda Sánchez (D-CA-38)
- Loretta Sanchez, former U.S. representative from California
- Juan Vargas (D-CA-51)
- Filemon Vela Jr. (D-TX-34)

State officials

- Cruz Bustamante, former lieutenant governor of California
- John Chiang, State Treasurer of California and candidate for governor in 2018

==== Results ====
California's 46th congressional district election, 2018
Party	Candidate	Votes	%
Democratic	Lou Correa (incumbent)	102,278	69.1
Republican	Russell Rene Lambert	45,638	30.9
Total votes		147,916	100.0
Democratic hold			

== District 47 ==
2018 California's 47th congressional district election
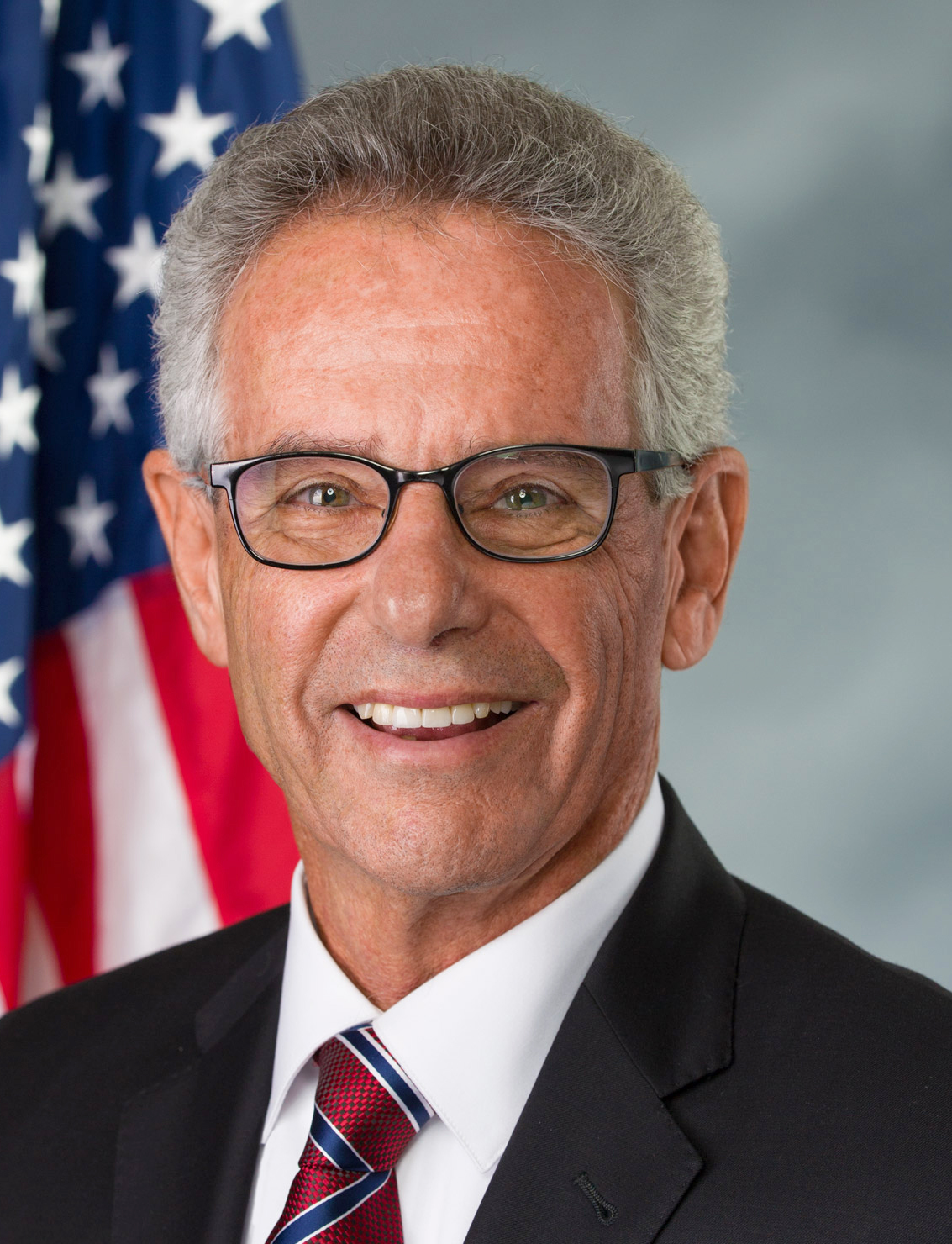

Nominee	Alan Lowenthal	John Briscoe
Party	Democratic	Republican
Popular vote	143,354	77,682
Percentage	64.9%	35.1%
- County results Lowenthal: 50–60% 70–80%
U.S. Representative before election
Alan Lowenthal
Democratic
Elected U.S. Representative
Alan Lowenthal
Democratic

The 47th district encompasses Long Beach, Catalina Island, and parts of western Orange County, including Garden Grove and Westminster. Incumbent Democrat Alan Lowenthal, who had represented the 47th district since 2013, ran for re-election. He was re-elected with 63.7% of the vote in 2016. The district had a PVI of D+13.

=== Primary election ===
==== Democratic candidates ====
===== Advanced to general =====
- Alan Lowenthal, incumbent U.S. representative

==== Republican candidates ====
===== Advanced to general =====
- John Briscoe, business professor and Ocean View School District board member

===== Eliminated in primary =====
- David Michael Clifford, small business owner

==== Endorsements ====
David Michael Clifford (R)

Organizations

- California Republican Assembly
- Long Beach Young Republicans
- Republican Party of Los Angeles County
- Republican Party of Orange County

==== Results ====
Nonpartisan blanket primary results
Party	Candidate	Votes	%
Democratic	Alan Lowenthal (incumbent)	70,539	60.6
Republican	John Briscoe	25,122	21.6
Republican	David Michael Clifford	20,687	17.8
Total votes		116,348	100.0

=== General election ===
==== Predictions ====
Source	Ranking	As of
The Cook Political Report	Safe D	November 5, 2018
Inside Elections	Safe D	November 5, 2018
Sabato's Crystal Ball	Safe D	November 5, 2018
RealClearPolitics	Safe D	November 5, 2018
Daily Kos	Safe D	November 5, 2018
538	Safe D	November 7, 2018
CNN	Safe D	October 31, 2018
Politico	Safe D	November 4, 2018

==== Endorsements ====
Alan Lowenthal (D)

Organizations

- J Street PAC

==== Results ====
California's 47th congressional district election, 2018
Party	Candidate	Votes	%
Democratic	Alan Lowenthal (incumbent)	143,354	64.9
Republican	John Briscoe	77,682	35.1
Total votes		221,036	100.0
Democratic hold			

== District 48 ==
2018 California's 48th congressional district election
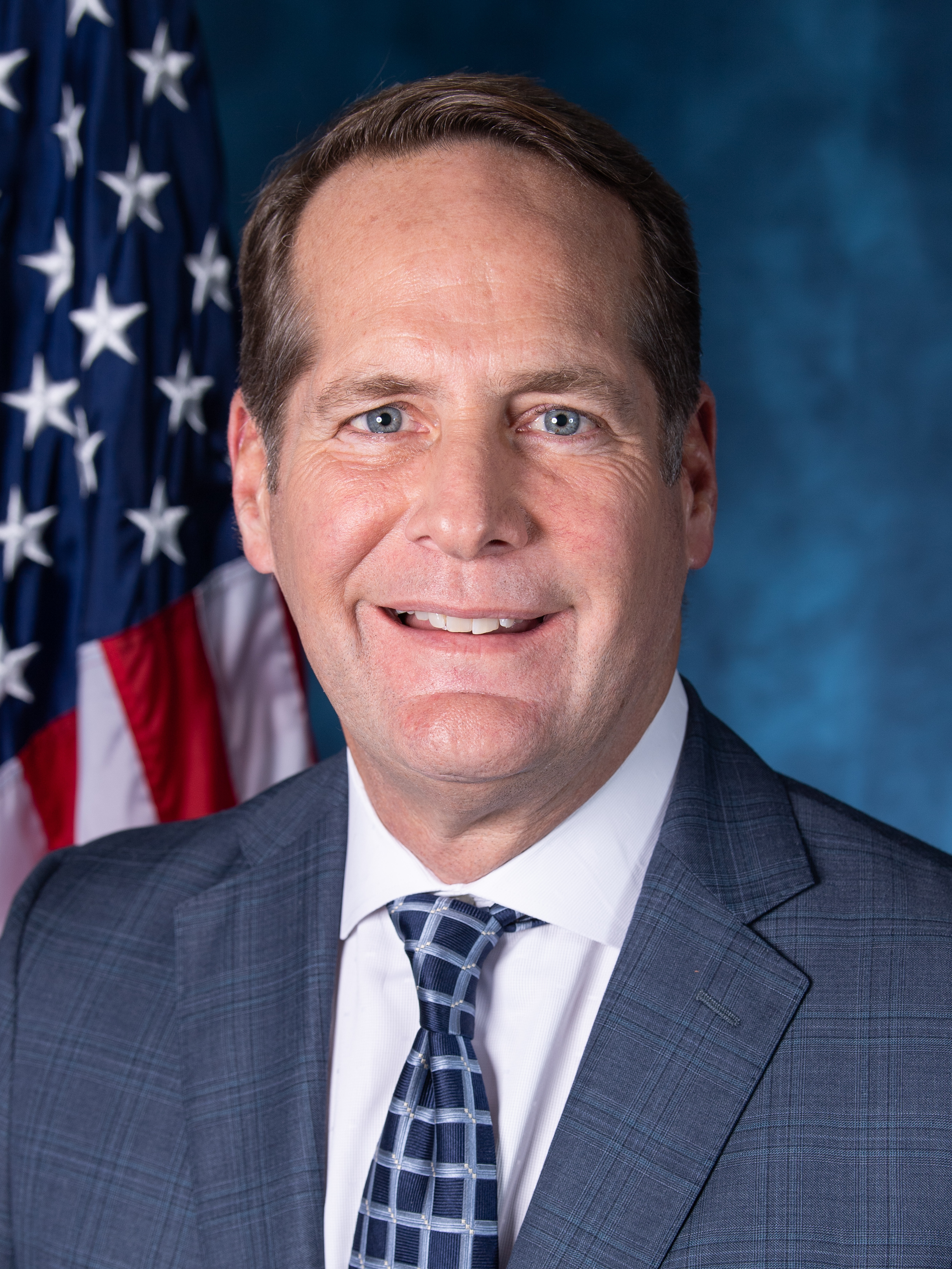

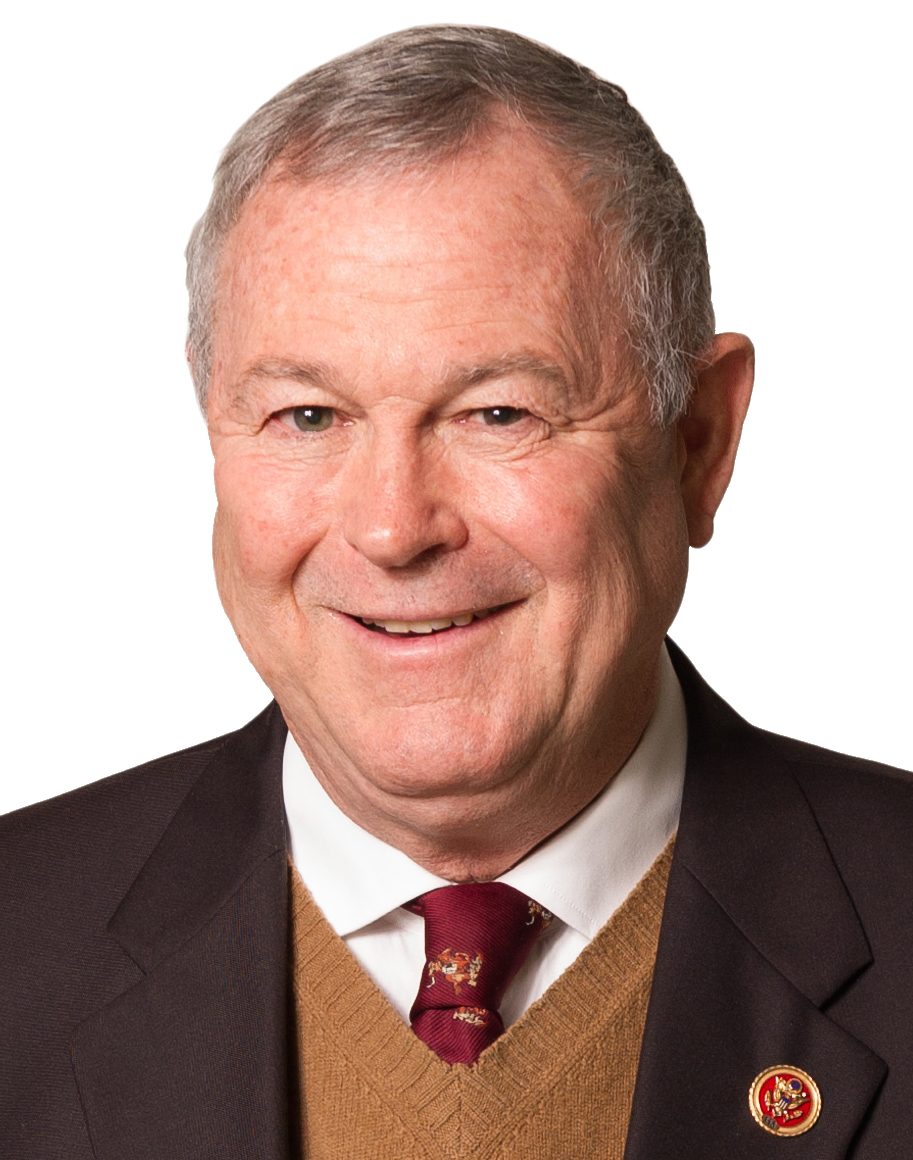
Nominee	Harley Rouda	Dana Rohrabacher
Party	Democratic	Republican
Popular vote	157,837	136,899
Percentage	53.6%	46.4%
- Rouda—50–60%
U.S. Representative before election
Dana Rohrabacher
Republican
Elected U.S. Representative
Harley Rouda
Democratic

The 48th district is based in coastal Orange County and includes Costa Mesa, Huntington Beach and Newport Beach. Incumbent Republican Dana Rohrabacher, who had represented the 48th district since 2013 and previously represented the 46th district from 2003 to 2013, the 45th district from 1993 to 2003, and the 42nd district from 1989 to 1993, ran for re-election. He was re-elected with 58.5% of the vote in 2016. The district had a PVI of R+4.

=== Primary election ===
==== Republican candidates ====
===== Advanced to general =====
- Dana Rohrabacher, incumbent U.S. representative

===== Eliminated in primary =====
- Scott Baugh, former state assembly member
- John Gabbard, small business owner
- Paul Martin, businessman
- Stelian Onufrei, construction business owner

==== Democratic candidates ====
California's 48th district was included on the list of Republican-held seats being targeted by the Democratic Congressional Campaign Committee in 2018.

===== Advanced to general =====
- Harley Rouda, real estate executive

===== Eliminated in primary =====
- Hans Keirstead, stem cell biologist
- Michael Kotick, global business executive
- Laura Oatman, architect
- Rachel Payne, businesswoman
- Deanie Ann Schaarsmith
- Omar Siddiqui, attorney
- Tony Zarkades, Marine veteran

===== Withdrawn =====
- Michael Anthony Ellinger
- Boyd Roberts

==== Libertarian candidates ====
===== Eliminated in primary =====
- Brandon Reiser, businessman

==== Independent candidates ====
===== Eliminated in primary =====
- Kevin Kensinger, licensed investment professional

==== Endorsements ====
Scott Baugh (R)

U.S. representatives

- John Campbell, former U.S. representative from California

State legislators

- Dick Ackerman, former state senator
- Patricia Bates, California state senator (R-36)
- John Moorlach, California state senator (R-37)
- Jim Silva, former state assemblyman

Organizations

- California Republican Taxpayers Association

Local officials

- Cheryl Brothers, Fountain Valley City Council member
- Kevin Muldoon, Newport Beach City Council member
- Steve Nagel, Fountain Valley mayor pro tempore
- Will O'Neill, Newport Beach mayor pro tempore
- Jim Righeimer, Costa Mesa City Council member
- Rhonda Shader, Placentia mayor pro tempore

Individuals

- Stelian Onufrei, former candidate for CA-48 in 2018
Hans Keirstead (D)

U.S. representatives

- Bill Foster, U.S. representative (D-IL-11)
- Jerry McNerney, U.S. representative (D-CA-9)
- Raul Ruiz, U.S. representative (D-CA-36)

State officials

- Bill Dodd, California state senator (D-3)
- Fiona Ma, chair of the California State Board of Equalization
- Sharon Quirk-Silva, California state assemblymember (D-65)

Labor unions

- International Association of Machinists and Aerospace Workers
- International Longshore and Warehouse Union
- National Union of Healthcare Workers
- Service Employees International Union
- Southwest Regional Council of Carpenters
- Teamsters Joint Council #42

Organizations

- 314 Action
- California Democratic Party
- Democratic Party of Orange County
- Moms Demand Action "Gun Sense Candidate"

Local officials

- Ross Chun, Aliso Viejo mayor pro tempore
- Debbie Cook, former Huntington Beach mayor
- Shirley Dettloff, former Huntington Beach mayor and California Coastal Commissioner
- Melissa Fox, Irvine city councilwoman

Individuals

- Eric C. Bauman, chair of the California Democratic Party
- Dr. Michael Gottfredson, vice chancellor of the University of California, Irvine
- Florice Hoffman, regional director of the California Democratic Party
- Roman Reed, philanthropist and president of the Roman Reed Foundation
- Fran Sdao, chair of the Orange County Democratic Party
Omar Siddiqui (D)

Organizations

- Orange County Young Democrats

==== Polling ====
Poll source	Date(s) administered	Sample size	Margin of error	Scott Baugh (R)	Hans Keirstead (D)	Dana Rohrabacher (R)	Harley Rouda (D)	Omar Siddiqui (D)	Other	Undecided
ALG Research (D-Keirstead)	May 6–8, 2018	400	± 4.9%	15%	14%	31%	13%	5%	10% (Note: Laura Oatman* (D) 4%, Rachel Payne* (D) and John Gabbard (R) with 2%, Stelian Onufrei* (R) and Michael Kotick* (D) with 1%. *Withdrawn, but remains on ballot.)	12%
Tulchin Research (D-Rouda)	May 1–5, 2018	400	± 4.9%	13%	13%	30%	13%	4%	10% (Note: %Laura Oatman* (D) 4%; John Gabbard (R) and Shastina Sandman (R) with 2%; Rachel Payne* (D) and Kevin Kensinger (NPP) with 1%. *Withdrawn, but remains on ballot.)	18%
Change Research (D-314 Action)	May 2–3, 2018	590	± 4.0%	17%	19%	27%	11%	–	–	–
Change Research (D)	March 4–6, 2018	688	–	–	18%	35%	14%	14%	13% (Note: Stelian Onufrei* (R), 11%, Other 2%. *Withdrawn, but remains on ballot.)	–

==== Results ====
Results by county supervisorial district: Rohrabacher—30–40% Rohrabacher—<30%

Nonpartisan blanket primary results
Party	Candidate	Votes	%
Republican	Dana Rohrabacher (incumbent)	52,737	30.3
Democratic	Harley Rouda	30,099	17.3
Democratic	Hans Keirstead	29,974	17.2
Republican	Scott Baugh	27,514	15.8
Democratic	Omar Siddiqui	8,658	5.0
Republican	John Gabbard	5,664	3.3
Democratic	Rachel Payne (withdrawn)	3,598	2.1
Republican	Paul Martin	2,893	1.7
Republican	Shastina Sandman	2,762	1.6
Democratic	Michael Kotick (withdrawn)	2,606	1.5
Democratic	Laura Oatman (withdrawn)	2,412	1.4
Democratic	Deanie Schaarsmith	1,433	0.8
Democratic	Tony Zarkades	1,281	0.7
Libertarian	Brandon Reiser	964	0.6
Republican	Stelian Onufrei (withdrawn)	739	0.4
No party preference	Kevin Kensinger	690	0.4
Total votes		174,024	100.0

=== General election ===
==== Endorsements ====
Dana Rohrabacher (R)

U.S. executive branch officials

- Donald Trump, 45th president of the United States

Organizations

- National Republican Congressional Committee "Patriot" Program

Newspapers

- The Orange County Register
Harley Rouda (D)

U.S. executive branch officials

- Barack Obama, 44th president of the United States

U.S. representatives

- Pete Aguilar, U.S. representative (D-CA-31)
- Judy Chu, U.S. representative (D-CA-27)
- Lou Correa, U.S. representative (D-CA-46)
- Jared Huffman, U.S. representative (D-CA-6)
- Zoe Lofgren, U.S. representative (D-CA-19)
- Alan Lowenthal, U.S. representative (D-CA-47)
- Linda Sánchez, U.S. representative (D-CA-38)
- Loretta Sanchez, former U.S. representative from California
- Brad Sherman U.S. representative (D-CA-30)
- Mark Takano, U.S. representative (D-CA-41)

State officials

- Bill Lockyer, former Treasurer of California

State legislators

- Henry Stern, California state senator (D-27)

Labor unions

- California Nurses Association
- International Brotherhood of Electrical Workers Local 441
- International Union of Painters and Allied Trades District Council 36
- IUOE Local 12
- National Nurses United
- United Association of Journeymen and Apprentices of the Plumbing and Pipe Fitting Industry (UA) Local 582
- United Steelworkers Los Angeles/Orange Counties Legislative Education Committee

Organizations

- Democratic Congressional Campaign Committee "Red to Blue" Program
- J Street PAC
- League of Conservation Voters
- Sierra Club

Local officials

- Katrina Foley, former mayor of Costa Mesa and city council member
- Toni Iseman, Laguna Beach mayor
- Sukhee Kang, former mayor of Irvine

Individuals

- Frank Barbaro, former Orange County Democratic Party chairman
- Erwin Chemerinsky, founder of the University of California (UC) Irvine Law School and current University of California (UC) Berkeley Law School dean
- Dan Jacobson, chairman of the Democratic Foundation
- Michael Kotick, former candidate for CA-48 in 2018
- Laura Oatman, former candidate for CA-48 in 2018

==== Debate ====
2018 California's 48th congressional district debate
No.	Date	Host	Moderator	Link	Republican	Democratic
Key: P Participant A Absent N Not invited I Invited W Withdrawn						
Key: P Participant A Absent N Not invited I Invited W Withdrawn					Dana Rohrabacher	Harley Rouda
1	Oct. 15, 2018	KOCE-TV	Rick Reiff		P	P

==== Polling ====
Poll source	Date(s) administered	Sample size	Margin of error	Dana Rohrabacher (R)	Harley Rouda (D)	Undecided
NYT Upshot/Siena College	October 29 – November 4, 2018	491	± 4.7%	45%	46%	9%
Thomas Partner Strategies	October 30–31, 2018	440	± 4.7%	51%	41%	8%
Monmouth University	October 17–21, 2018	372	± 5.1%	50%	48%	2%
Thomas Partner Strategies	October 18–19, 2018	440	± 4.7%	49%	41%	9%
UC Berkeley	September 16–23, 2018	623	± 5.0%	48%	48%	4%
NYT Upshot/Siena College	September 4–6, 2018	501	± 4.8%	45%	45%	10%
Monmouth University	July 11–15, 2018	361 LV	± 5.2%	45%	47%	8%
Monmouth University	July 11–15, 2018	402 RV	± 4.9%	43%	46%	12%
Tulchin Research (D-Rouda)	September 30 – October 5, 2017	401	± 4.89%	48%	44%	8%

==== Predictions ====
Source	Ranking	As of
The Cook Political Report	Tossup	November 5, 2018
Inside Elections	Tilt D (flip)	November 5, 2018
Sabato's Crystal Ball	Lean D (flip)	November 5, 2018
RCP	Tossup	November 5, 2018
Daily Kos	Tossup	November 5, 2018
538	Tossup	November 7, 2018
CNN	Tossup	October 31, 2018
Politico	Tossup	November 4, 2018

==== Results ====
California's 48th congressional district election, 2018
Party	Candidate	Votes	%
Democratic	Harley Rouda	157,837	53.6
Republican	Dana Rohrabacher (incumbent)	136,899	46.4
Majority		20,938	7.2
Total votes		294,736	100.0
Democratic gain from Republican			

General election results by county supervisorial district

Rouda won all 3 county supervisorial districts. Blue represents county supervisorial districts won by Rouda.

General election results by county supervisorial district
County	Rohrabacher (D)		Rouda (R)		Total
County	Votes	%	Votes	%	Votes
District 1	14,794	45.6%	17,663	54.4%	32,457
District 2	94,960	47.8%	103,539	52.2%	198,499
District 5	27,145	42.6%	36,635	57.4%	63,780
Totals	136,889	46.4	157,837	53.6%	294,736

== District 49 ==
2018 California's 49th congressional district election
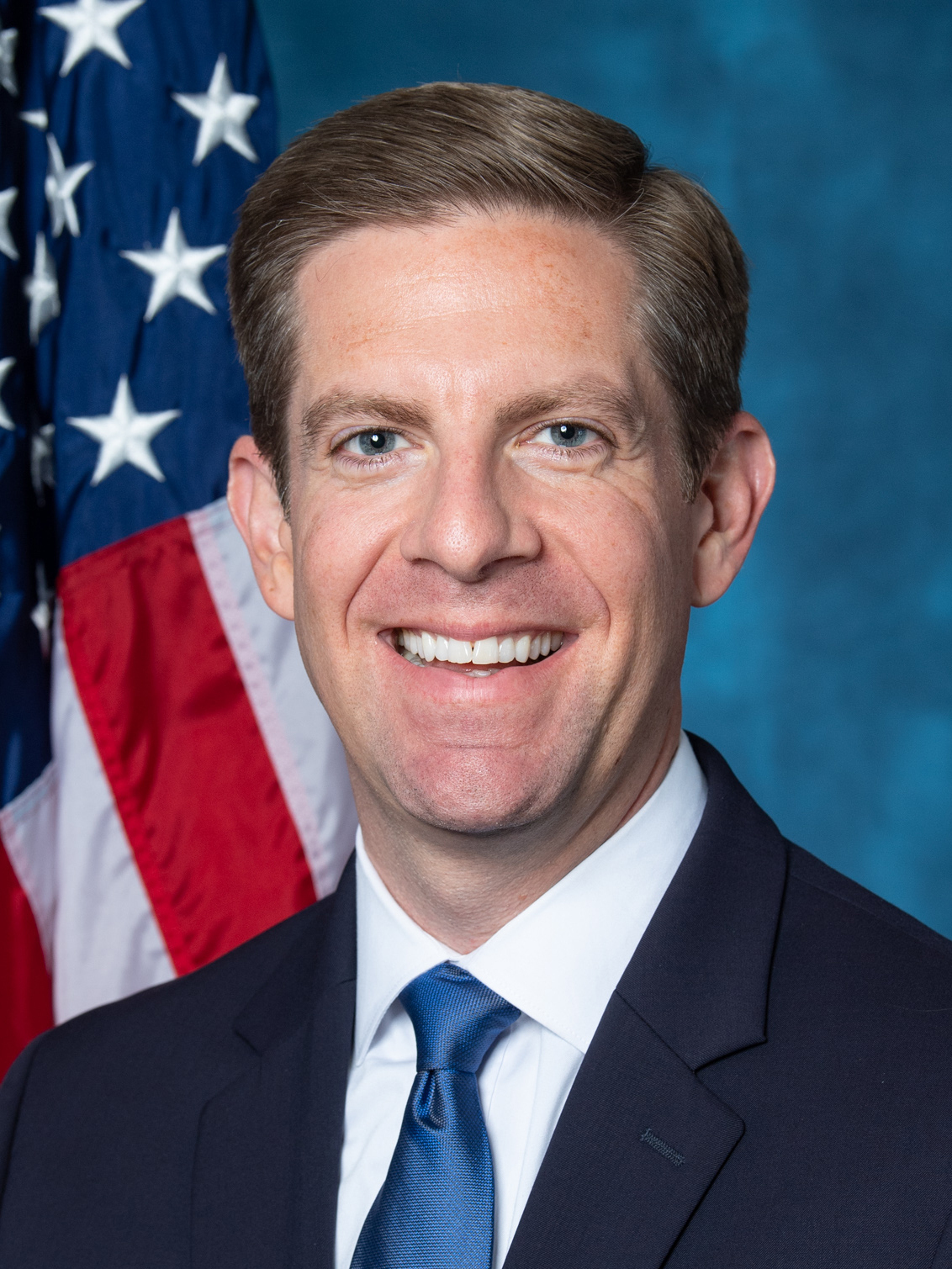

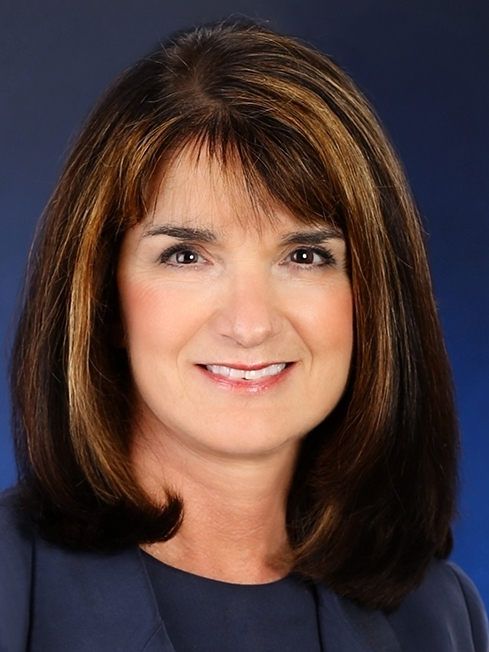
Nominee	Mike Levin	Diane Harkey
Party	Democratic	Republican
Popular vote	166,453	128,577
Percentage	56.4%	43.6%
- Levin—50–60% Harkey—50–60%
U.S. Representative before election
Darrell Issa
Republican
Elected U.S. Representative
Mike Levin
Democratic

The 49th district is based in northern San Diego County and parts of southern Orange County. It includes the cities of Carlsbad, Oceanside, San Juan Capistrano and San Clemente. Incumbent Republican Darrell Issa, who had represented the 49th district since 2003 and the 48th district from 2001 to 2003, retired and did not run in 2018. He was re-elected with 50.3% of the vote in 2016. The district had a PVI of R+1.

=== Primary election ===
California's 49th district was included on the list of Republican-held seats being targeted by the Democratic Congressional Campaign Committee in 2018. Given the close margin in 2016, this election was considered to be highly competitive.

==== Republican candidates ====
===== Advanced to general =====
- Diane Harkey, representative on California State Board of Equalization, and former state assembly member

===== Eliminated in primary =====
- Rocky Chávez, state assembly member
- Kristin Gaspar, member of San Diego County Board of Supervisors, and former mayor of Encinitas
- Brian Maryott, San Juan Capistrano city council member
- David Medway, physician
- Craig Arthur Nordal, real estate agent
- Mike Schmitt, audiologist
- Josh Schoonover, patent attorney

==== Democratic candidates ====
===== Advanced to general =====
- Mike Levin, environmental attorney

===== Eliminated in primary =====
- Doug Applegate, retired Marine colonel and general election candidate for this seat in 2016
- Sara Jacobs, former CEO of non-profit organization and foreign policy advisor on Hillary Clinton's 2016 campaign
- Paul Kerr, real estate investor

===== Withdrawn =====
- Christina Prejean, attorney

==== Libertarian candidates ====
===== Eliminated in primary =====
- Joshua Hancock, Marine veteran

==== Green candidates ====
===== Eliminated in primary =====
- Danielle St. John, human rights advocate

==== Independent candidates ====
===== Eliminated in primary =====
- Robert Pendleton, surgeon, businessman and artist

==== Peace and Freedom candidates ====
===== Eliminated in primary =====
- Jordan Mills, college professor and union organizer

==== Endorsements ====
Doug Applegate (D)

U.S. executive branch officials

- John H. Dalton, former United States Secretary of the Navy

U.S. representatives

- Loretta Sanchez, former U.S. congresswoman

State legislators

- Toni Atkins, California state senator (D-39)

Labor unions

- CA State Association of Letter Carriers
- California State American Postal Workers Union
- IBEW Local 47
- International Brotherhood of Electrical Workers Local 441
- International Union of Painters and Allied Trades (IUPAT) District Council 36
- Ironworkers 433
- National Nurses United
- Plasterers Union Local 200
- Plumbers, Steamfitters, Welders & Apprentices Union Local 582
- Roofers, Waterproofers & Allied Workers Local 220

Organizations

- Justice Democrats
- San Diego Democrats for Environmental Action
- VoteVets

Local officials

- Chuck Lowery, deputy mayor of Oceanside
Rocky Chávez (R)

State officials

- Arnold Schwarzenegger, former governor of California

State legislators

- Dante Acosta, assemblyman
- Catharine Baker, assemblywoman
- Phillip Chen, assemblyman
- Connie Conway, former assembly Republican leader
- Jordan Cunningham, assemblyman
- Brian Dahle, assembly Republican leader
- Heath Flora, assemblyman
- Devon Mathis, assemblyman
- Chad Mayes, former assembly Republican leader
- Jay Obernolte, assemblyman

Labor unions

- National Electrical Contractors Association

Newspapers

- The San Diego Union-Tribune

Local officials

- John Aguilera, Vista deputy mayor
- Joe Green, Vista city councilman
- Matt Hall, Carlsbad mayor
- Mark Packard, Carlsbad city councilmember
- Michael Schumacher, Carlsbad city councilmember
- Peter Weiss, Oceanside mayor

Individuals

- Stuart Spencer, former policy advisor to Ronald Reagan
Kristin Gaspar (R)

Labor unions

- Deputy Sheriffs' Association of San Diego County
Sara Jacobs (D)

U.S. representatives

- Susan Davis, U.S. representative (D-CA-53)
- Lois Frankel, U.S. representative (D-FL-21)
- Juan Vargas, U.S. representative (D-CA-51)

State officials

- Jason Kander, former Missouri Secretary of State

Organizations

- AAPI Democratic Club
- Emily's List
- National Organization for Women
- Orange County Young Democrats

Local officials

- Mara Elliott, San Diego City Attorney
- Mark West, mayor of Imperial Beach

==== Polling ====
Poll source	Date(s) administered	Sample size	Margin of error	Doug Applegate (D)	Rocky Chávez (R)	Kristin Gaspar (R)	Diane Harkey (R)	Sara Jacobs (D)	Paul Kerr (D)	Mike Levin (D)	Brian Maryott (R)	Other	Undecided
KGTV/SurveyUSA	May 29–31, 2018	612	± 4.7%	11%	8%	5%	24%	11%	8%	10%	6%	4% (Note: David Medway (R), Mike Schmitt (R), Joshua Schoonover (R), Robert Pendleton (K9) with 1%; Craig Nordal (R), Danielle St. John (G), Joshua Hancock (L), Jordan Mills (PFP) with 0%)	13%
Tulchin Research (D)	May 22–24, 2018	500	± 4.4%	12%	11%	7%	15%	11%	7%	17%	6%	–	13%
Benenson Strategy Group (D-Jacobs)	April 28 – May 2, 2018	901	± 3.3%	13%	14%	7%	14%	11%	4%	10%	6%	–	–
FM3 Research (D)	April 26–29, 2018	500	± 4.4%	16%	10%	9%	14%	12%	6%	11%	4%	3% (Note: Mike Schmitt (R) 2%, Danielle St. John (G) 1%)	16%
KGTV/SurveyUSA	April 6–10, 2018	535	± 5.3%	12%	16%	5%	8%	7%	8%	9%	5%	8% (Note: Mike Schmitt (R) 3%; David Medway (R), Craig Nordal (R), Joshua Schoonover (R), Joshua Hancock (L), and Jordan Mills (PFP) with 1%; Robert Pendleton (K9) 0% and Danielle St. John (G) with 0%)	21%
Change Research (D)	March 4–7, 2018	815	± 5.3%	15%	23%	5%	16%	13%	11%	17%	1%	–	–
Change Research (D)	March 4–7, 2018	815	± 5.3%	23%	15%	4%	10%	7%	7%	11%	2%	17% (Note: Mike Schmitt (R) and Christina Prejean* (D) with 3%; David Arnold* (R) 2%; Craig Nordal (R), Josh Schoonover (R), David Medway (R), Supriya Christopher* (D), and Christina Borgese* (R) with 1%; Jordan Mills (PFP) and Robert Pendleton (K9) with 0%; Other 4%. *Withdrawn.)	–
FM3 Research (D)	February 12–15, 2018	750 (Note: Likely November general election voters)	± 3.6%	21%	15%	8%	11%	5%	1%	13%	–	7% (Note: Christina Prejean* (D) 2%, Other 1%, Not voting 4%. *Withdrawn.)	19% (Note: Other/Undecided 19%)
FM3 Research (D)	February 12–15, 2018	400 (Note: Likely June primary voters)	± 3.6%	16%	19%	9%	15%	6%	2%	12%	–	5% (Note: Christina Prejean* (D) 1%, Other 1%, Not voting 3%. *Withdrawn.)	16% (Note: Other/Undecided 16%)
KGTV/SurveyUSA	February 10–13, 2018	510	± 5.4%	18%	17%	7%	10%	5%	1%	8%	2%	5% (Note: District 49: Joshua Schoonover (R) 2%; Jordan Mills (PFP) and Christina Prejean* (D) with 1%; Joshua Hancock (L) 0%; Other 1%. *Withdrawn.)	27%

Hypothetical polling

Without Paul Kerr

Poll source	Date(s) administered	Sample size	Margin of error	Doug Applegate (D)	Rocky Chávez (R)	Kristin Gaspar (R)	Diane Harkey (R)	Sara Jacobs (D)	Mike Levin (D)
FM3 Research (D)	February 12–15, 2018	400 LV	± 4.9%	20%	18%	9%	17%	8%	17%
FM3 Research (D)	February 12–15, 2018	400 LV	± 4.9%	21%	19%	10%	18%	—	20%
FM3 Research (D)	February 12–15, 2018	400 LV	± 4.9%	26%	18%	10%	17%	12%	—
FM3 Research (D)	February 12–15, 2018	400 LV	± 4.9%	—	21%	11%	18%	11%	22%

Without Kristin Gaspar and Paul Kerr

Poll source	Date(s) administered	Sample size	Margin of error	Doug Applegate (D)	Rocky Chávez (R)	Diane Harkey (R)	Sara Jacobs (D)	Mike Levin (D)
FM3 Research (D)	February 12–15, 2018	400 LV	± 4.9%	20%	22%	21%	7%	17%
FM3 Research (D)	February 12–15, 2018	400 LV	± 4.9%	21%	23%	22%	—	20%
FM3 Research (D)	February 12–15, 2018	400 LV	± 4.9%	26%	22%	21%	12%	—
FM3 Research (D)	February 12–15, 2018	400 LV	± 4.9%	—	25%	21%	12%	22%

==== Results ====
Results by county: Harkey—30–40% Harkey—<30%

Nonpartisan blanket primary results
Party	Candidate	Votes	%
Republican	Diane Harkey	46,468	25.5
Democratic	Mike Levin	31,850	17.5
Democratic	Sara Jacobs	28,778	15.8
Democratic	Doug Applegate	23,850	13.1
Republican	Kristin Gaspar	15,467	8.5
Republican	Rocky Chávez	13,739	7.5
Democratic	Paul G. Kerr	8,099	4.4
Republican	Brian Maryott	5,496	3.0
Republican	Mike Schmitt	2,379	1.3
Republican	Josh Schoonover	1,362	0.7
Republican	Craig A. Nordal	1,156	0.6
Republican	David Medway	1,066	0.6
No party preference	Robert Pendleton	905	0.5
Green	Danielle St. John	690	0.4
Libertarian	Joshua L. Hancock	552	0.3
Peace and Freedom	Jordan J. Mills	233	0.1
Total votes		182,090	100.0

=== General election ===
==== Endorsements ====
Diane Harkey (R)

U.S. executive branch officials

- Donald Trump, president of the United States

U.S. representatives

- Ken Calvert, U.S. representative (R-CA-42)
- Darrell Issa, U.S. representative (R-CA-49)
- Kevin McCarthy, U.S. representative (R-CA-23)
- Dana Rohrabacher, U.S. representative (R-CA-48)
- David Valadao, U.S. representative (R-CA-21)
- Mimi Walters, U.S. representative (R-CA-45)

State legislators

- Travis Allen, assemblyman
- Bill Brough, assemblyman
- Phillip Chen
- Steven Choi, assemblyman
- Shannon Grove, former assemblywoman
- Brian Jones, former assemblyman
- Melissa Melendez, assemblywoman
- Mike Morrell, senator
- Jim Patterson, assemblyman
- Jeff Stone, senator

Organizations

- Association of Orange County Deputy Sheriffs
- California Association of Tax Professionals
- California Republican Veterans Association
- California Statewide Law Enforcement Association
- Howard Jarvis Taxpayers Association
- Maggie's List
- National Republican Congressional Committee "Young Guns" Program
- Orange County Coalition of Police and Sheriffs

Newspapers

- The Orange County Register

Local officials

- Lisa Bartlett, Orange County Supervisor District 5
- Barbara Delgleize, Huntington Beach mayor
- Carl DeMaio, former San Diego City councilmember
- Andrew Do, Orange County Supervisor District 1
- Ernie Dronenburg, San Diego County Assessor
- Sandra Hutchens, Orange County sheriff
- Ginger Marshall, Solana Beach mayor
- Mike Munzing, Aliso Viejo mayor
- Claude Parrish, Orange County County Assessor
- Michelle Steel, Orange County Supervisor District 2
- Donald P. Wagner, Irvine mayor
- Jim Wood, Oceanside mayor
Mike Levin (D)

U.S. executive branch officials

- Barack Obama, 44th president of the United States

U.S. representatives

- Nanette Barragan, U.S. representative (D-CA-44)
- Earl Blumenauer, U.S. representative (D-OR-3)
- Tony Cardenas, U.S. representative (D-CA-29)
- Jimmy Gomez, U.S. representative (D-CA-34)
- Alan Lowenthal, U.S. representative (D-CA-47)
- Adam Schiff, U.S. representative (D-CA-28)
- Brad Sherman, U.S. representative (D-CA-30)
- Eric Swalwell, U.S. representative (D-CA-15)

State officials

- Betty Yee, California State Controller

State legislators

- Ben Allen, California state senator (D-26)
- Tom Daly, California State Assemblymember (D-69)
- Laura Friedman, California State Assemblymember (D-43)
- Fiona Ma, California Board of Equalization member (D-2) and former Assemblywoman
- Patrick O'Donnell, California State Assemblymember (D-70)
- Henry Stern, California state senator (D-27)

Labor unions

- California Teachers Association
- International Brotherhood of Electrical Workers, Local 569
- International Longshore and Warehouse Union, Locals 13, 63, and 94
- Southwest Regional Council of Carpenters

Organizations

- California League of Conservation Voters
- Congressional Hispanic Caucus' BOLD PAC
- Congressional Progressive Caucus
- Council for a Livable World
- Democracy for America
- Democratic Congressional Campaign Committee "Red to Blue" Program
- Human Rights Campaign
- J Street PAC
- National Organization for Women
- Planned Parenthood Action Fund
- Progressive Change Campaign Committee
- Sierra Club

Newspapers

- The San Diego Union-Tribune

Local officials

- Tasha Boerner Horvath, Encinitas City councilmember
- Barbara Bry, San Diego City councilmember
- Sergio Farias, mayor of San Juan Capistrano
- Robert Garcia, mayor of Long Beach
- Toni Iseman, mayor of Laguna Beach
- Sheila Kuehl, Los Angeles County supervisor
- Debra Lewis, Dana Point City councilmember
- Miguel Pulido, mayor of Santa Ana
- Alejandra Sotelo-Solis, National City city councilmember
- Chris Ward, San Diego city councilmember
- Dwight Worden, mayor of Del Mar

==== Debates ====
2018 California's 49th congressional district debates
No.	Date	Host	Moderator	Link	Republican	Democratic
Key: P Participant A Absent N Not invited I Invited W Withdrawn						
Key: P Participant A Absent N Not invited I Invited W Withdrawn					Diane Harkey	Mike Levin
1	October 2, 2018	KNSD-TV			P	P
2	October 26, 2018	KUSI-TV	Lauren Phinney		P	P

==== Polling ====
Poll source	Date(s) administered	Sample size	Margin of error	Diane Harkey (R)	Mike Levin (D)	Undecided
SurveyUSA	October 29 – November 1, 2018	500	± 5.4%	44%	51%	5%
NYT Upshot/Siena College	October 19–24, 2018	500	± 4.7%	39%	53%	8%
NYT Upshot/Siena College	September 18–23, 2018	507	± 4.7%	41%	51%	8%
UC Berkeley	September 16–23, 2018	551	± 6.0%	41%	55%	4%
Public Opinion Strategies (R-Harkey)	September 17–20, 2018	400	–	43%	45%	–
Public Opinion Strategies (R-Harkey)	July 15–17, 2018	400	± 4.9%	46%	43%	9%
Feldman Group (D-Levin)	June 24–27, 2018	400	± 4.6%	46%	49%	–

Hypothetical polling

Poll source	Date(s) administered	Sample size	Margin of error	Mike Levin (D)	Republican candidate (R)	Undecided
FM3 Research (D)	February 12–15, 2018	400 LV	± 4.9%	41%	37%	22%

Poll source	Date(s) administered	Sample size	Margin of error	Doug Applegate (D)	Republican candidate (R)	Undecided
FM3 Research (D)	February 12–15, 2018	400 LV	± 4.9%	41%	38%	21%

Poll source	Date(s) administered	Sample size	Margin of error	Paul Kerr (D)	Republican candidate (R)	Undecided
FM3 Research (D)	February 12–15, 2018	400 LV	± 4.9%	39%	37%	24%

Poll source	Date(s) administered	Sample size	Margin of error	Sara Jacobs (D)	Republican candidate (R)	Undecided
FM3 Research (D)	February 12–15, 2018	400 LV	± 4.9%	41%	38%	21%

Poll source	Date(s) administered	Sample size	Margin of error	Republican candidate	Democratic candidate	Undecided
FM3 Research (D)	February 12–15, 2018	400 LV	± 4.9%	41%	48%	11%

Poll source	Date(s) administered	Sample size	Margin of error	Republican candidate	Democratic candidate	Undecided
PPP/Patriot Majority USA	February 12–13, 2018	659	± 3.8%	41%	50%	9%

With Darrell Issa

Poll source	Date(s) administered	Sample size	Margin of error	Darrell Issa (R)	Democratic candidate	Undecided
PPP/Patriot Majority USA	October 5–8, 2017	824	± 3.4%	41%	51%	8%

==== Predictions ====
Source	Ranking	As of
The Cook Political Report	Likely D (flip)	November 5, 2018
Inside Elections	Lean D (flip)	November 5, 2018
Sabato's Crystal Ball	Likely D (flip)	November 5, 2018
RCP	Lean D (flip)	November 5, 2018
Daily Kos	Likely D (flip)	November 5, 2018
538	Safe D (flip)	November 7, 2018
CNN	Lean D (flip)	October 31, 2018
Politico	Lean D (flip)	November 4, 2018

==== Results ====
California's 49th congressional district election, 2018
Party	Candidate	Votes	%
Democratic	Mike Levin	166,453	56.4
Republican	Diane Harkey	128,577	43.6
Majority		37,876	12.8
Total votes		295,030	100.0
Democratic gain from Republican			

General election results by county

Blue represents counties won by Levin. Red represents counties won by Harkey.

General election results by county
County	Harkey (R)		Levin (D)		Total
County	Votes	%	Votes	%	Votes
Orange	40,325	53.4%	35,124	46.6%	75,449
San Diego	88,252	40.2%	131,329	59.8%	219,581
Totals	128,577	56.4%	166,543	43.6%	295,030

== District 50 ==
2018 California's 50th congressional district election
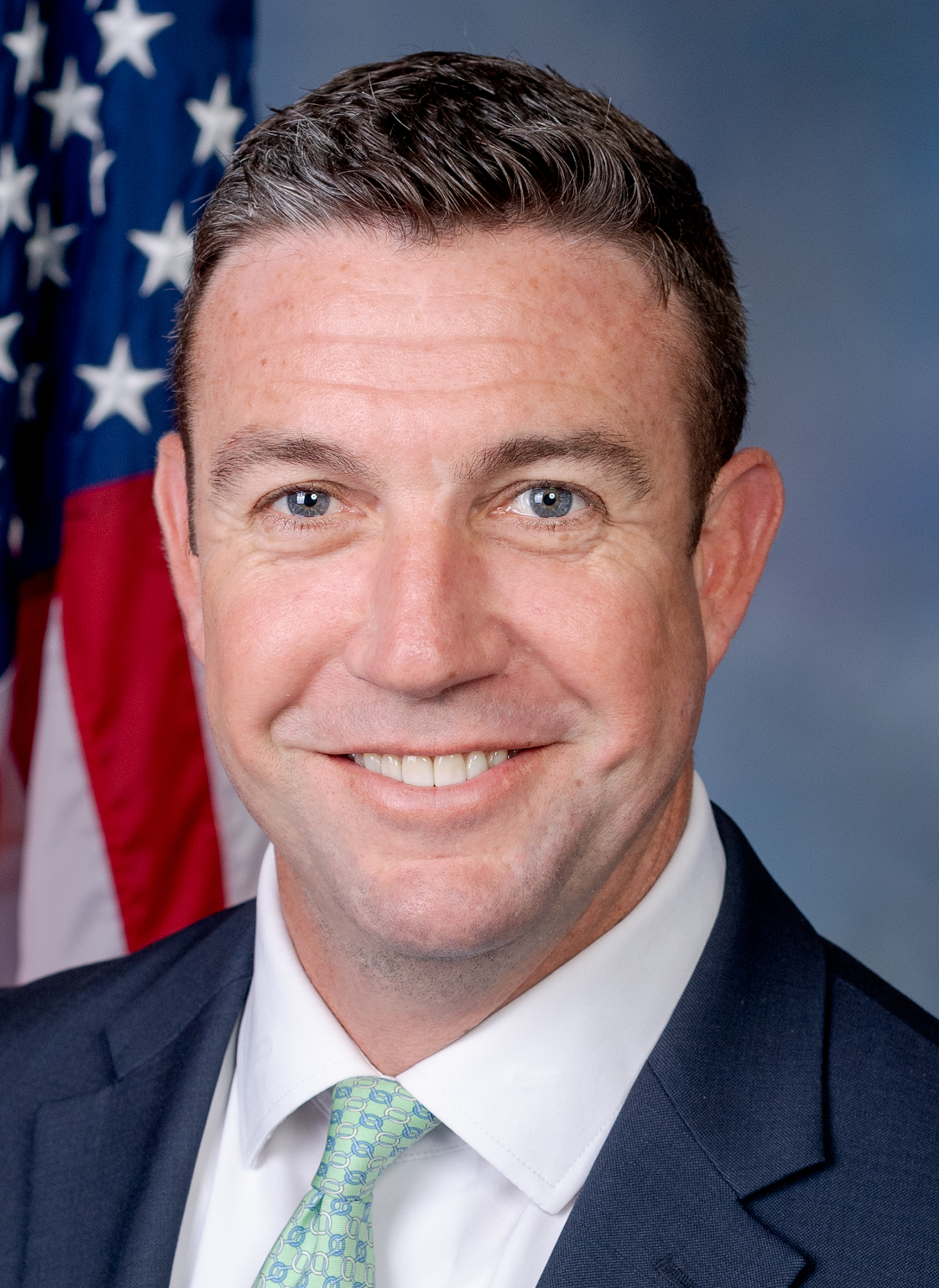

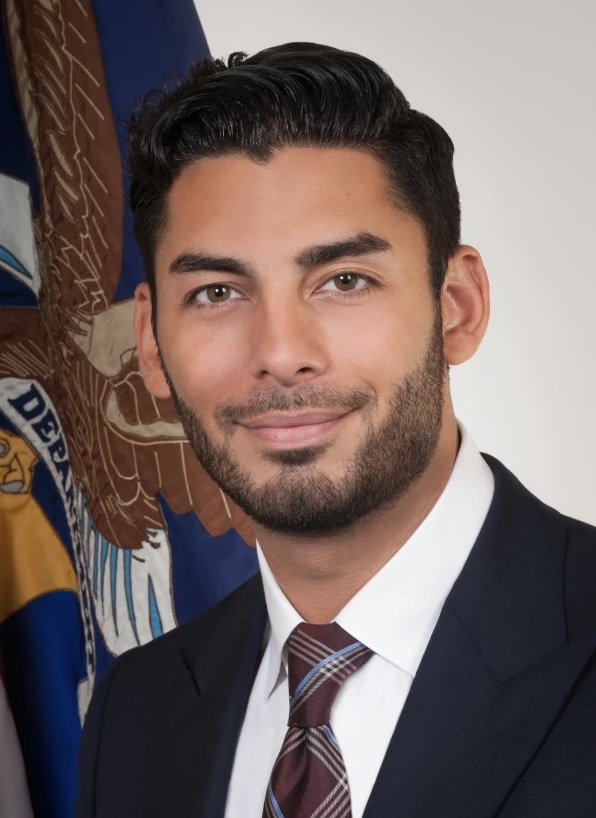
Nominee	Duncan D. Hunter	Ammar Campa-Najjar
Party	Republican	Democratic
Popular vote	134,362	125,448
Percentage	51.7%	48.3%
- County results Hunter: 50–60%
U.S. Representative before election
Duncan D. Hunter
Republican
Elected U.S. Representative
Duncan D. Hunter
Republican

The 50th district is based in inland San Diego County and includes Escondido and Santee. Incumbent Republican Duncan D. Hunter, who had represented the 50th district since 2013 and previously represented the 52nd district from 2009 to 2013, ran for re-election. He was re-elected with 63.5% of the vote in 2016. The district had a PVI of R+11.

=== Primary election ===
==== Republican candidates ====
===== Advanced to general =====
- Duncan D. Hunter, incumbent U.S. representative

===== Eliminated in primary =====
- Shamus Sayed, CEO of Interpreters Unlimited
- Bill Wells, mayor of El Cajon

===== Withdrawn =====
- Andrew Zelt, San Diego County sheriff's deputy

==== Democratic candidates ====
California's 50th district was included on the list of Republican-held seats being targeted by the Democratic Congressional Campaign Committee in 2018.

===== Advanced to general =====
- Ammar Campa-Najjar, small business owner

===== Eliminated in primary =====
- Josh Butner, former Navy SEAL
- Patrick Malloy, business owner, realtor and general election candidate for this seat in 2016

===== Withdrawn =====
- Pierre Beauregard
- Gloria Chadwick
- Glenn Jensen
- Alex Spilger

==== Independent candidates ====
===== Eliminated in primary =====
- Rich Kahle, personal trainer

==== Polling ====
Poll source	Date(s) administered	Sample size	Margin of error	Josh Butner (D)	Ammar Campa-Najjar (D)	Duncan Hunter (R)	Patrick Malloy (D)	Bill Wells (R)	Other	Undecided
KGTV/SurveyUSA	May 15–20, 2018	567	± 5.1%	5%	10%	43%	7%	6%	3% (Note: S. "Shamus" Sayed (R) 3%, Richard Kahle (NPP) 0%)	25%
Tulchin Research (D-Campa-Najjar)	–	500	± 4.4%	6%	14%	39%	6%	8%	–	25%

==== Results ====
Nonpartisan blanket primary results
Party	Candidate	Votes	%
Republican	Duncan D. Hunter (incumbent)	69,563	47.4
Democratic	Ammar Campa-Najjar	25,799	17.6
Republican	Bill Wells	18,951	12.9
Democratic	Josh Butner	18,944	12.9
Democratic	Patrick Malloy	8,607	5.9
Republican	S. "Shamus" Sayed	3,079	2.1
No party preference	Richard Kahle	1,714	1.2
Total votes		145,657	100.0

=== General election ===
==== Campaign ====
On August 22, 2018, Hunter and his wife were both indicted on federal charges for alleged misuse of campaign funds.

Hunter repeatedly attacked his Campa-Najjar over his half-Palestinian heritage, claiming that Campa-Najjar, who converted to Christianity from Islam in high school, was an "Islamist" trying to "infiltrate Congress", and describing him as a "security threat" with terrorist ties. The Washington Post fact-checkers wrote that an October 1, 2018, television ad by Hunter's campaign used "naked anti-Muslim bias" and sought to scare Californians from voting for Campa-Najjar, despite the fact that Campa-Najjar "isn't even Muslim. All the claims in the ad are false, misleading or devoid of evidence." Hunter also claimed that Campa-Najjar was being supported by CAIR and the Muslim Brotherhood; PolitiFact gave this claim its "Pants on Fire" rating. CNN, The Guardian, BuzzFeed News, and The Daily Beast described Hunter's campaign as "anti-Muslim", Vox described it as "race-baiting", and The Atlantic called it "one of the most brazenly anti-Muslim smear campaigns in recent history." After Hunter's attacks on Campa-Najjar were widely condemned, Hunter doubled down on the attacks in a direct mail letter written and signed by three defense industry lobbyists, characterizing Campa-Najjar as a national security risk. Campa-Najjar described Hunter's attacks as "pathological."

==== Endorsements ====
Ammar Campa-Najjar (D)

U.S. executive branch officials

- Barack Obama, 44th president of the United States

U.S. senators

- Kamala Harris, US senator
- Elizabeth Warren, US senator

U.S. representatives

- Tulsi Gabbard, representative from Hawai'i's 2nd Congressional District
- Joe Kennedy III, US congress

State officials

- Betty Yee, California state controller

State legislators

- Lorena Gonzalez-Fletcher, California state assembly

Labor unions

- Communications Workers of America
- National Nurses United
- Service Employees International Union

Organizations

- J Street PAC
- League of Conservation Voters
- Our Revolution
- Sierra Club

Local officials

- Eric Garcetti, mayor of Los Angeles

==== Polling ====
Poll source	Date(s) administered	Sample size	Margin of error	Duncan Hunter (R)	Ammar Campa-Najjar (D)	Undecided
SurveyUSA	October 25–29, 2018	547	± 4.8%	48%	45%	8%
Tulchin Research (D-Campa-Najjar)	September 29 – October 1, 2018	400	± 4.9%	45%	44%	11%
Monmouth University	September 22–26, 2018	348 LV	± 5.3%	53%	38%	8%
Monmouth University	September 22–26, 2018	401 RV	± 4.9%	49%	41%	10%
UC Berkeley	September 16–23, 2018	527	± 6.0%	49%	47%	4%
Tulchin Research (D-Campa-Najjar)	August 27–30, 2018	400	± 4.9%	46%	46%	8%
SurveyUSA	August 22–26, 2018	539	± 5.1%	47%	39%	13%
Tulchin Research (D-Campa-Najjar)	July 17–23, 2018	400	± 4.89%	51%	42%	7%

==== Predictions ====
Source	Ranking	As of
The Cook Political Report	Lean R	November 5, 2018
Inside Elections	Lean R	November 5, 2018
Sabato's Crystal Ball	Lean R	November 5, 2018
RCP	Lean R	November 5, 2018
Daily Kos	Lean R	November 5, 2018
538	Likely R	November 7, 2018
CNN	Likely R	October 31, 2018
Politico	Lean R	November 4, 2018

==== Results ====
California's 50th congressional district election, 2018
Party	Candidate	Votes	%
Republican	Duncan D. Hunter (incumbent)	134,362	51.7
Democratic	Ammar Campa-Najjar	125,448	48.3
Majority		8,914	3.4
Total votes		259,810	100.0
Republican hold			

== District 51 ==
2018 California's 51st congressional district election
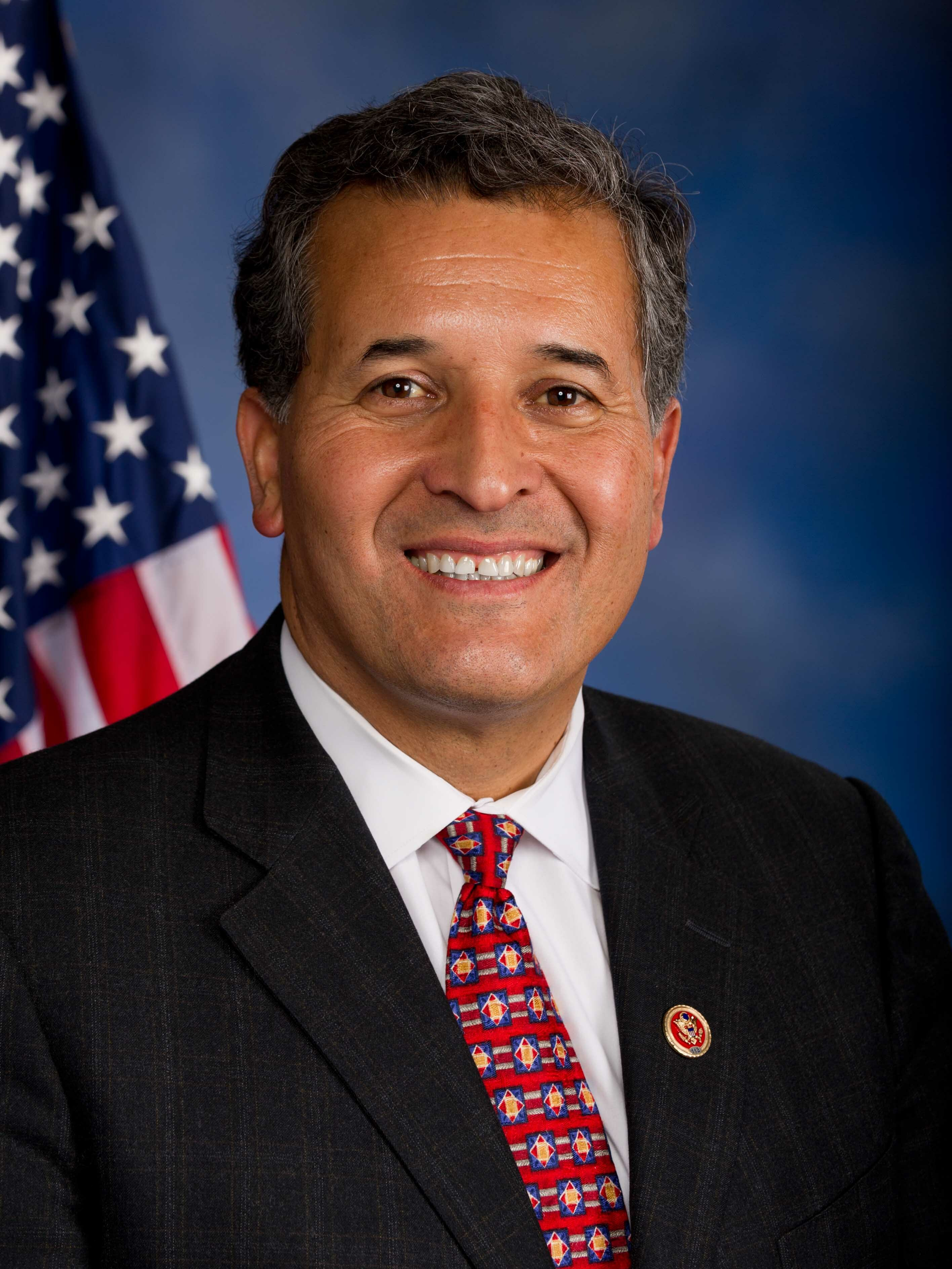

Nominee	Juan Vargas	Juan M. Hidalgo Jr.
Party	Democratic	Republican
Popular vote	109,527	44,301
Percentage	71.2%	28.8%
- County results Vargas: 60–70% 70–80%
U.S. Representative before election
Juan Vargas
Democratic
Elected U.S. Representative
Juan Vargas
Democratic

The 51st district runs along the border with Mexico and includes Imperial County and San Diego. Democrat Juan Vargas, who had represented the 51st district since 2013, ran for re-election. He was re-elected with 72.2% of the vote in 2016. The district had a PVI of D+22.

=== Primary election ===
==== Democratic candidates ====
===== Advanced to general =====
- Juan Vargas, incumbent U.S. representative

==== Republican candidates ====
===== Advanced to general =====
- Juan Hidalgo Jr., retired U.S. Marine

===== Eliminated in primary =====
- Louis Fuentes, air conditioning contractor
- John Renison, small business owner

==== Independent candidates ====
===== Eliminated in primary =====
- Juan Carlos Mercado, deputy sheriff
- Kevin Mitchell

==== Results ====
Nonpartisan blanket primary results
Party	Candidate	Votes	%
Democratic	Juan Vargas (incumbent)	50,132	64.0
Republican	Juan M. Hidalgo Jr.	11,972	15.3
Republican	John Renison	10,972	14.0
No party preference	Juan (Charlie) Carlos Mercado	2,452	3.1
No party preference	Kevin Mitchell	1,473	1.9
Republican	Louis A. Fuentes	1,310	1.7
Total votes		78,318	100.0

=== General election ===
==== Predictions ====
Source	Ranking	As of
The Cook Political Report	Safe D	November 5, 2018
Inside Elections	Safe D	November 5, 2018
Sabato's Crystal Ball	Safe D	November 5, 2018
RealClearPolitics	Safe D	November 5, 2018
Daily Kos	Safe D	November 5, 2018
538	Safe D	November 7, 2018
CNN	Safe D	October 31, 2018
Politico	Safe D	November 4, 2018

==== Results ====
California's 51st congressional district election, 2018
Party	Candidate	Votes	%
Democratic	Juan Vargas (incumbent)	109,527	71.2
Republican	Juan M. Hidalgo Jr.	44,301	28.8
Total votes		153,828	100.0
Democratic hold			

== District 52 ==
2018 California's 52nd congressional district election
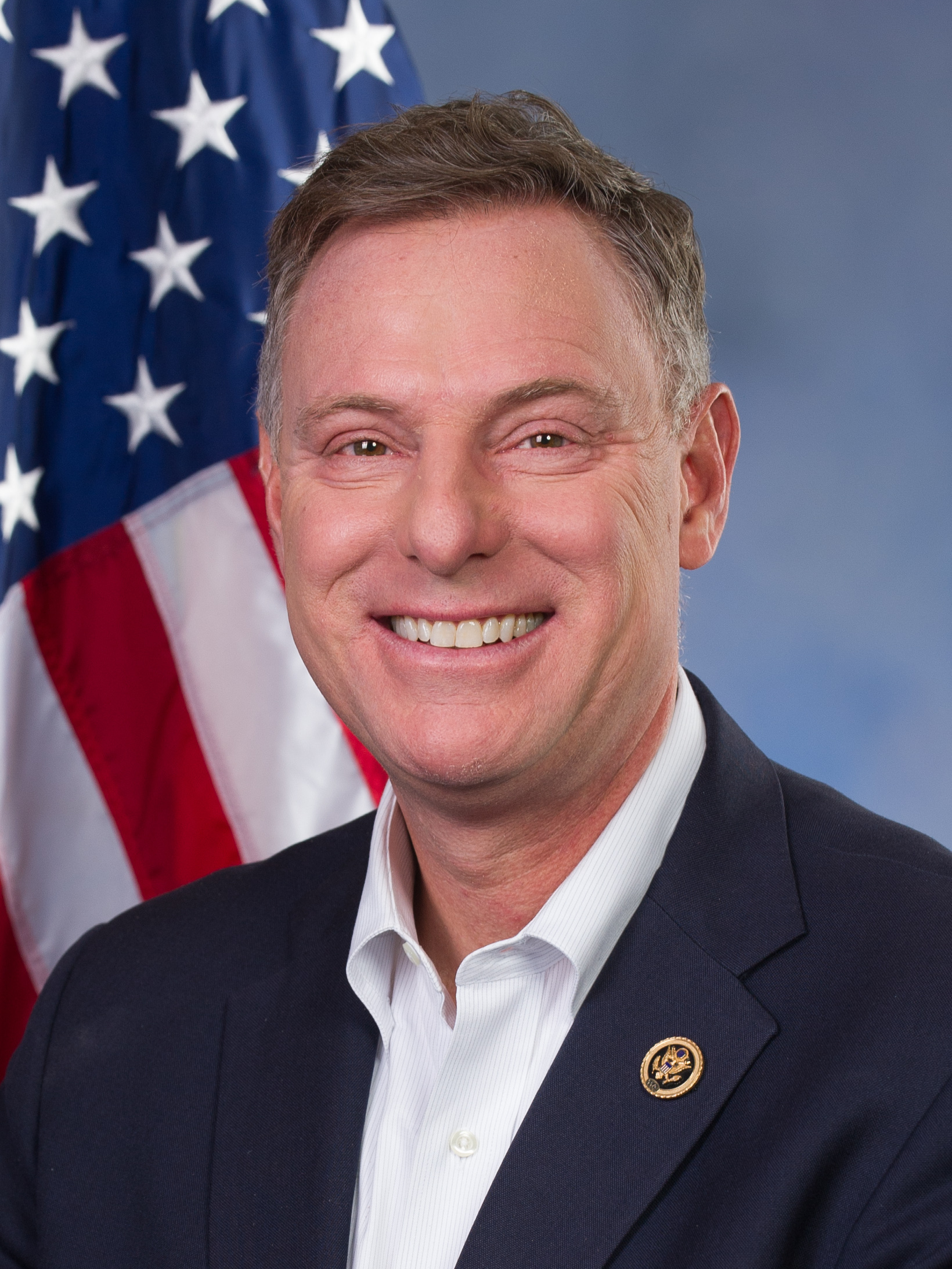

Nominee	Scott Peters	Omar Qudrat
Party	Democratic	Republican
Popular vote	188,992	107,015
Percentage	63.8%	36.2%
- County results Peters: 60–70%
U.S. Representative before election
Scott Peters
Democratic
Elected U.S. Representative
Scott Peters
Democratic

The 52nd district is based in coastal San Diego and includes La Jolla and Poway. Democrat Scott Peters, who had represented the 52nd district since 2013, ran for re-election. He was re-elected with 56.5% of the vote in 2016. The district had a PVI of D+6.

=== Primary election ===
==== Democratic candidates ====
===== Advanced to general =====
- Scott Peters, incumbent U.S. representative

===== Withdrawn =====
- Alexander Miller

==== Republican candidates ====
California's 52nd district was included on the list of Democratic-held seats being targeted by the National Republican Congressional Committee in 2018.

===== Advanced to general =====
- Omar Qudrat, counter terrorism attorney

===== Eliminated in primary =====
- Michael Allman, direct democracy advocate
- Danny Casara, retired Army sergeant
- Jeff Cullen, internal medicine doctor
- John Horst, cyber security engineer
- James Veltmeyer, physician and surgeon

==== Independent candidates ====
===== Withdrawn =====
- Freeman Michaels

==== Results ====
Nonpartisan blanket primary results
Party	Candidate	Votes	%
Democratic	Scott Peters (incumbent)	98,744	59.0
Republican	Omar Qudrat	25,530	15.3
Republican	James Veltmeyer	19,040	11.4
Republican	Daniel Casara	7,680	4.6
Republican	Michael Allman	6,561	3.9
Republican	John Horst	5,654	3.4
Republican	Jeffery Cullen	4,027	2.4
Total votes		167,236	100.0

=== General election ===
==== Predictions ====
Source	Ranking	As of
The Cook Political Report	Safe D	November 5, 2018
Inside Elections	Safe D	November 5, 2018
Sabato's Crystal Ball	Safe D	November 5, 2018
RealClearPolitics	Safe D	November 5, 2018
Daily Kos	Safe D	November 5, 2018
538	Safe D	November 7, 2018
CNN	Safe D	October 31, 2018
Politico	Safe D	November 4, 2018

==== Endorsements ====
Scott Peters (D)

Organizations

- Democratic Congressional Campaign Committee "Frontline" Program
- J Street PAC

==== Results ====
California's 52nd congressional district election, 2018
Party	Candidate	Votes	%
Democratic	Scott Peters (incumbent)	188,992	63.8
Republican	Omar Qudrat	107,015	36.2
Total votes		296,007	100.0
Democratic hold			

== District 53 ==
2018 California's 53rd congressional district election
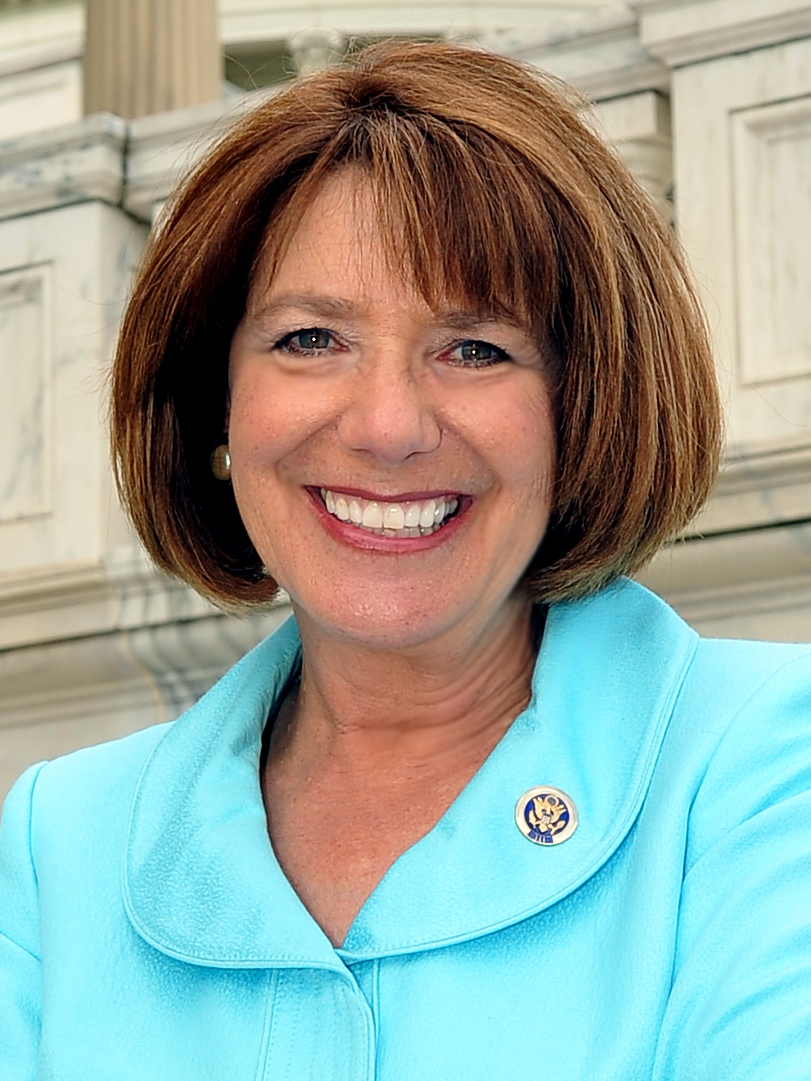

Nominee	Susan Davis	Morgan Murtaugh
Party	Democratic	Republican
Popular vote	185,667	83,127
Percentage	69.1%	30.9%
- County results A. davis: 60–70%
U.S. Representative before election
Susan Davis
Democratic
Elected U.S. Representative
Susan Davis
Democratic

The 53rd district is based in Central San Diego and includes La Mesa and Lemon Grove. Democrat Susan Davis, who had represented the 53rd district since 2003 and previously represented the 49th district from 2001 to 2003, ran for re-election. She was re-elected with 67.0% of the vote in 2016. The district had a PVI of D+14.

=== Primary election ===
==== Democratic candidates ====
===== Advanced to general =====
- Susan Davis, incumbent U.S. representative

==== Republican candidates ====
===== Advanced to general =====
- Morgan Murtaugh, political commentator

===== Eliminated in primary =====
- Brett Goda, sales representative
- Shawn Gino Kane, small business manager
- Matt Mendoza, Lemon Grove City council member

==== Independent candidates ====
===== Eliminated in primary =====
- Bryan Kim, community organizer

==== Results ====
Nonpartisan blanket primary results
Party	Candidate	Votes	%
Democratic	Susan Davis (incumbent)	93,051	64.1
Republican	Morgan Murtaugh	20,827	14.3
Republican	Matt Mendoza	19,710	13.6
Republican	Shawn Gino Kane	5,319	3.7
No party preference	Bryan Kim	3,460	2.4
Republican	Brett A. Goda	2,899	2.0
Total votes		145,265	100.0

=== General election ===
==== Predictions ====
Source	Ranking	As of
The Cook Political Report	Safe D	November 5, 2018
Inside Elections	Safe D	November 5, 2018
Sabato's Crystal Ball	Safe D	November 5, 2018
RealClearPolitics	Safe D	November 5, 2018
Daily Kos	Safe D	November 5, 2018
538	Safe D	November 7, 2018
CNN	Safe D	October 31, 2018
Politico	Safe D	November 4, 2018

==== Endorsements ====
Susan Davis (D)

Organizations

- J Street PAC

==== Results ====
California's 53rd congressional district election, 2018
Party	Candidate	Votes	%
Democratic	Susan Davis (incumbent)	185,667	69.1
Republican	Morgan Murtaugh	83,127	30.9
Total votes		268,794	100.0
Democratic hold			

== See also ==
- 2018 United States House of Representatives elections
- 2018 United States elections
